= National Register of Historic Places listings in DuPage County, Illinois =

Location of DuPage County in Illinois

This is a list of the National Register of Historic Places listings in DuPage County, Illinois.

This is intended to be a complete list of the properties and districts on the National Register of Historic Places in DuPage County, Illinois, United States. Latitude and longitude coordinates are provided for many National Register properties and districts; these locations may be seen together in a map.

There are 50 properties and districts listed on the National Register in the county. Another three properties were once listed but have been removed.

This National Park Service list is complete through NPS recent listings posted May 8, 2026.

== Current listings ==
| | Name on the Register | Image | Date listed | Location | City or town | Description |
|---|---|---|---|---|---|---|
| 1 | Adams Memorial Library | Adams Memorial Library | June 4, 1981 (#81000675) | 102 East Wesley St. 41°51′57″N 88°06′23″W | Wheaton | The library was designed by Charles Sumner Frost in 1891. It was the only library in the area until 1965. Later that year it was converted to the DuPage County Historical Museum. |
| 2 | Ardmore Avenue Train Station | Ardmore Avenue Train Station | November 21, 1980 (#80004525) | 10 W. Park Ave. 41°53′00″N 87°58′46″W | Villa Park | One of the few Chicago Aurora and Elgin Railroad stations still standing. |
| 3 | George Baker House | George Baker House | March 1, 2010 (#10000038) | 1 S. 500 Taylor Rd. 41°51′02″N 88°03′20″W | Milton Township | The house of an early settler to DuPage County. |
| 4 | Orland P. Bassett House | Orland P. Bassett House | December 7, 2004 (#04001299) | 329 E. Sixth St. 41°47′55″N 87°55′18″W | Hinsdale | Home of Orland P. Bassett, who is credited as the first person to distribute the American Beauty rose. His company became the largest employer in Hinsdale. |
| 5 | Big Woods School | Big Woods School | April 21, 2016 (#16000197) | 3033 N. Eola Rd. 41°48′56″N 88°13′55″W | Aurora | |
| 6 | Blanchard Hall | Blanchard Hall | November 14, 1979 (#79000836) | Wheaton College campus 41°52′07″N 88°05′58″W | Wheaton | The oldest building at Wheaton College, named after its founder Jonathan Blanchard. The architecture is meant to evoke the buildings at Oxford University. |
| 7 | Bloomingdale School–Village Hall | Bloomingdale School–Village Hall | October 28, 1994 (#94001263) | 108 W. Lake St. 41°57′26″N 88°04′56″W | Bloomingdale | A two-story, two-classroom schoolhouse from the early 20th century. It was used as the Bloomingdale Village Hall from 1938 to 1977. |
| 8 | Butler School | Butler School | May 9, 2003 (#03000355) | 1200 31st. St. (Oak Brook Rd.); 41°50′05″N 87°56′46″W | Oak Brook | A two-room schoolhouse in the Georgian Revival style. The term "Oak Brook" for the surrounding community was first used in a meeting in the building. |
| 9 | Chicago Golf Club | Chicago Golf Club | May 29, 2020 (#100005231) | 25W253 Warrenville Rd. 41°50′56″N 88°06′58″W | Wheaton | |
| 10 | Chicago Sanitary and Ship Canal Historic District | Chicago Sanitary and Ship Canal Historic District | December 20, 2011 (#11000907) | Illinois Waterway miles 290.0-321.7; 41°41′53″N 87°57′13″W | Willow Springs and Lemont | part of the Illinois Waterway Navigation System Facilities MPS; extends through the West Side of Chicago, Cook County west of Chicago and Will County to Lockport |
| 11 | Robert A. and Mary Childs House | Robert A. and Mary Childs House | May 11, 2000 (#00000476) | 318 S. Garfield Ave. 41°47′56″N 87°55′40″W | Hinsdale | Home of Civil War veteran and U.S. Representative Robert A. Childs and his wife Mary. |
| 12 | Churchville School | Churchville School | February 5, 1999 (#99000114) | 3N 784 Church Rd. 41°56′08″N 87°57′14″W | Bensenville | A schoolhouse constructed in 1846. |
| 13 | William and Helen Coffeen House | William and Helen Coffeen House | December 22, 2014 (#14001066) | 306 S. Garfield; 41°47′58″N 87°55′39″W | Hinsdale | |
| 14 | Avery Coonley School | Avery Coonley School | August 8, 2007 (#07000477) | 1400 Maple Ave. 41°47′18″N 88°01′13″W | Downers Grove | A progressive school landscaped by Jens Jensen. |
| 15 | Dell Rhea's Chicken Basket | Dell Rhea's Chicken Basket | May 5, 2006 (#06000375) | 645 Joliet Rd. 41°44′51″N 87°56′22″W | Willowbrook | A restaurant on historic U.S. Route 66. Part of the Route 66 through Illinois Multiple Property Submission. |
| 16 | Downtown Hinsdale Historic District | Downtown Hinsdale Historic District | May 30, 2006 (#06000011) | Roughly Bounded by Maple St., Lincoln St., Garfield St. and Second St. 41°48′09″N 87°55′45″W | Hinsdale | |
| 17 | DuPage County Courthouse | DuPage County Courthouse | June 7, 1978 (#78003107) | 200 Reber St. 41°51′50″N 88°06′14″W | Wheaton | |
| 18 | William H. Emery, Jr. House | William H. Emery, Jr. House | May 12, 2004 (#04000421) | 281 Arlington; 41°53′39″N 87°56′18″W | Elmhurst | |
| 19 | First Church of Lombard | First Church of Lombard | August 10, 1978 (#78001144) | Maple and Main Sts. 41°52′59″N 88°01′07″W | Lombard | |
| 20 | Fullersburg Woods Forest Preserve | | May 14, 2026 (#100012945) | 3609 Spring Road; 41°49′26″N 87°56′03″W | Oak Brook | |
| 21 | Glen Ellyn Downtown North Historic District | Glen Ellyn Downtown North Historic District | September 18, 2013 (#13000716) | Main St., Crescent Blvd., & Pennsylvania Ave. 41°52′37″N 88°04′00″W | Glen Ellyn | |
| 22 | Glen Ellyn Downtown South Historic District | Glen Ellyn Downtown South Historic District | September 18, 2013 (#13000717) | Main & Duane Sts., Hillside Ave. 41°52′30″N 88°03′58″W | Glen Ellyn | |
| 23 | Glen Ellyn Main Street Historic District | Glen Ellyn Main Street Historic District | October 29, 1984 (#84000204) | Main St. between Cottage Ave. and Hawthorne St. 41°52′49″N 88°04′00″W | Glen Ellyn | |
| 24 | Grand Theatre | Grand Theatre | August 12, 2005 (#05000872) | 123 N. Hale St. 41°51′56″N 88°06′29″W | Wheaton | |
| 25 | Graue Mill | Graue Mill | May 12, 1975 (#75002077) | NW of jct. of Spring and York Rds. 41°49′12″N 87°55′40″W | Oak Brook | |
| 26 | William L. Gregg House | William L. Gregg House | October 3, 1980 (#80004526) | 115 S. Linden; 41°47′35″N 87°58′24″W | Westmont | |
| 27 | Hauptgebaude | Hauptgebaude | August 13, 1976 (#76002162) | 190 Prospect St. 41°53′45″N 87°56′43″W | Elmhurst | |
| 28 | Frank B. Henderson House | Frank B. Henderson House | August 9, 2002 (#02000844) | 301 S. Kenilworth; 41°53′39″N 87°56′18″W | Elmhurst | |
| 29 | Samuel and Eleanor Himmelfarb House and Studio | Samuel and Eleanor Himmelfarb House and Studio | October 4, 2018 (#100002417) | 28W 120 Marion Rd. 41°51′54″N 88°10′05″W | Winfield | |
| 30 | Immanuel Evangelical Church | Immanuel Evangelical Church | February 9, 2001 (#01000085) | 302 S. Grant St. 41°47′57″N 87°55′56″W | Hinsdale | |
| 31 | Lake Ellyn Park | Lake Ellyn Park | February 7, 2017 (#100000628) | 645 Lenox Rd. 41°52′58″N 88°03′38″W | Glen Ellyn | |
| 32 | Lilacia Park Historic District | Lilacia Park Historic District | May 9, 2019 (#100003914) | 150 S. Park Ave. 41°52′40″N 88°14′24″W | Lombard | |
| 33 | McAuley School District No. 27 | McAuley School District No. 27 | June 3, 1982 (#82004890) | Roosevelt Rd. 41°52′40″N 88°14′24″W | West Chicago | |
| 34 | Naperville Historic District | Naperville Historic District | September 29, 1977 (#77001516) | Roughly bounded by Juilian, Highland, Chicago, Jackson, Eagle, and 5th Sts. 41°46′32″N 88°09′07″W | Naperville | |
| 35 | Old Lace School | | May 15, 2026 (#100013002) | 7422 Cass Avenue; 41°45′08″N 87°58′27″W | Darien | |
| 36 | Francis Stuyvesant Peabody Estate | Francis Stuyvesant Peabody Estate | February 18, 1994 (#93000836) | 1717 W. 31st St. 41°49′44″N 87°57′31″W | Oak Brook | |
| 37 | Francis Stuyvesant Peabody House | Francis Stuyvesant Peabody House | November 8, 2000 (#00001330) | 8 E. Third St. 41°47′59″N 87°55′44″W | Hinsdale | |
| 38 | John L. Pentecost House | John L. Pentecost House | September 13, 2003 (#03000916) | 259 Cottage Hill Ave. 41°53′38″N 87°56′31″W | Elmhurst | |
| 39 | Pine Craig | Pine Craig | August 15, 1975 (#75002076) | Aurora Rd. (Rte. 65); 41°46′10″N 88°09′13″W | Naperville | |
| 40 | Randecker's Hardware Store | Randecker's Hardware Store | October 28, 1994 (#94001265) | 112 S. Bloomingdale Rd. 41°57′23″N 88°04′53″W | Bloomingdale | |
| 41 | Robinwood | Robinwood | January 21, 2004 (#03001463) | 208 Arlington; 41°53′49″N 87°56′14″W | Elmhurst | |
| 42 | Robbins Park Historic District | Robbins Park Historic District | November 26, 2008 (#08001098) | Bounded by Chicago Av, 8th St, County Line Rd, Garfield St; 41°47′54″N 87°55′18″W | Hinsdale | |
| 43 | Alfred A. Schiller House | Alfred A. Schiller House | September 3, 2008 (#08000326) | 734 Lenox Rd. 41°53′11″N 88°03′39″W | Glen Ellyn | Demolished in 2016 |
| 44 | William and Jennette Sloane House | William and Jennette Sloane House | December 30, 2016 (#16000896) | 248 S. Arlington Ave. 41°53′38″N 87°56′12″W | Elmhurst | |
| 45 | Stacy's Tavern | Stacy's Tavern | October 29, 1974 (#74002195) | Geneva Rd. and Main St. 41°53′23″N 88°03′53″W | Glen Ellyn | |
| 46 | Theosophical Society in America Headquarters | | April 15, 2025 (#100011694) | 1926 North Main Street; 41°53′08″N 88°06′26″W | Wheaton | |
| 47 | Trinity Episcopal Church | Trinity Episcopal Church | January 9, 1978 (#78003108) | 130 N. West St. 41°51′57″N 88°06′43″W | Wheaton | |
| 48 | Turner Town Hall | Turner Town Hall | May 13, 1991 (#91000573) | 132 Main St. 41°53′01″N 88°12′15″W | West Chicago | |
| 49 | Villa Avenue Train Station | Villa Avenue Train Station | August 22, 1986 (#86001480) | 220 S. Villa Ave. 41°53′08″N 87°58′10″W | Villa Park | |
| 50 | Wayne Depot | | January 2, 2026 (#100012472) | 32W305 Army Trail Rd. 41°57′01″N 88°14′59″W | Wayne | |
| 51 | Wayne Village Historic District | Wayne Village Historic District | December 29, 1978 (#78003106) | Irregular pattern along Army Trail Rd. 41°57′04″N 88°14′46″W | Wayne | |
| 52 | William Whitney House | William Whitney House | October 19, 1989 (#89001731) | 142 E. First St. 41°48′05″N 87°55′28″W | Hinsdale | |

== Former listings ==
| | Name on the Register | Image | Date listed | Date removed | Location | City or town | Description |
|---|---|---|---|---|---|---|---|
| 1 | Besch House | | July 27, 1979 (#79003161) | October 20, 1981 | O S 070 Church St. | Winfield | Removed due to relocation. |
| 2 | Henry C. Middaugh House | | September 21, 1978 (#78003105) | August 14, 2004 | 66 Norfolk Ave. 41°48′07″N 87°57′01″W | Clarendon Hills | Demolished in 2002. |
| 3 | DuPage Theatre and DuPage Shoppes | DuPage Theatre and DuPage Shoppes | November 20, 1987 (#87002047) | January 2, 2020 | 101-109 S. Main St. 41°53′09″N 88°01′04″W | Lombard | Demolished in 2007 by the Board of Trustees of the Village of Lombard. |

== See also ==
- List of National Historic Landmarks in Illinois
- National Register of Historic Places listings in Illinois
