= Michael Hodges =

Michael Hodges may refer to:

- Michael Hodges (Royal Navy officer) (1874–1951)
- Michael Hodges (writer) (born 1976), American speculative fiction writer
- Michael Hodges (producer), American singer-songwriter, record producer and music executive
- Mike Hodges (born 1932), English screenwriter, film director, playwright and novelist
- Mike Hodges (American football) (born 1945), American football player and coach
- Michael Hodges (American football) (born 1986), American football coach
- Mike Hodges (politician), American politician
