= Eleanor Himmelfarb =

American painter, educator and conservationist

Eleanor Gorecki Himmelfarb
- Born: August 16, 1910; St. Charles, Illinois, US
- Died: June 16, 2009 (aged 98); Winfield, Illinois, US
- Education: University of Illinois at Chicago, Art Institute of Chicago, University of Chicago
- Known for: Painting, teaching, conservation
- Style: Modernism
- Spouse: Sam Himmelfarb (1939–1976)
- Website: Eleanor Himmelfarb

Eleanor Gorecki Himmelfarb (August 16, 1910 – June 16, 2009) was an American artist, teacher and conservationist known for semi-abstract paintings that reference the landscape and human figure, and for her work protecting woodlands in DuPage County, Illinois. She studied art history and design at the University of Chicago, natural history at the Morton Arboretum, and fine art at the Art Institute of Chicago and University of Illinois at Chicago. Critics characterize Himmelfarb as a modernist, who explored her subjects metaphorically through complex rhythmic compositions, stylized forms, and subtle coloration. Her work was featured in solo shows at the Evanston Art Center (retrospective), University Club of Chicago and Sioux City Art Center, and group exhibitions at the Art Institute of Chicago, Chicago Cultural Center, and Renaissance Society. Himmelfarb taught painting and design for four decades at several institutions, including over 30 years at the DuPage Art League. She was married to the painter, Sam Himmelfarb, and helped him design their house, the Samuel and Eleanor Himmelfarb Home and Studio (built, 1942) in Winfield, Illinois, which is listed on the National Register of Historic Places. Their son, John Himmelfarb, and grandchild, Serena Aurora, are also artists. Himmelfarb died at age 98 in Winfield in 2009.

Eleanor Himmelfarb, Ephemerae III, acrylic on canvas, 42" x 42", 1993

== Life ==
Himmelfarb was born Eleanor Gorecki in St. Charles, Illinois in 1910 to a Polish-born father, John, and a German-American mother, Elsie Borman. She spent most of her childhood on area farms before attending St. Charles High School, where she was influenced by an arts-oriented curriculum and the principal, H. Clark Brown, who encouraged her to attend the University of Chicago in 1926. She studied art history and design for two years there, boarding with a family on Chicago's South Side, but was forced to take a year off to teach elementary school due to financial hardship caused by the Great Depression. She returned to complete her degree in 1930, supporting herself with an interior decorating job. During the next decade, she worked for RR Donnelley as a proofreader, traveled to Mexico with women friends (where she met lifelong friend and muralist, Alfredo Zalce), and took up progressive politics. She met her future husband, Sam Himmelfarb, at a Hyde Park activist meeting in the late 1930s.

She and Himmelfarb married in 1939, remaining so until Sam's death in 1976. In 1940, they purchased an undeveloped property in rural Winfield, Illinois, intending to settle and raise a family there. In late 1942, they built and moved into a modernist, Usonian-influenced house designed by Sam, where Eleanor would live for the rest of her life. The home's large art studio and floor-to-ceiling views of the DuPage River and surrounding woodlands would serve as longtime inspirations for Eleanor's artistic pursuits. In the 1940s, she explored photography as well as mosaic tiles, block prints, stained glass and weaving; she and Sam also had two children, Susan (b. 1943) and John (b. 1946). Himmelfarb began studying at the Morton Arboretum with naturalist May Watts during that time; Watts would insist that Himmelfarb take over instruction of the Arboretum's painting classes in the 1950s, initiating a long teaching career.

== Art career ==
Eleanor Himmelfarb, This Green Earth, oil on canvas, 48" x 60", 1974. Illinois Legacy Collection, Illinois State Museum, 2011.43, Gift of John Himmelfarb and Susan Himmelfarb.

Himmelfarb turned to painting with increasing focus in the mid-1950s; she took up conservation in the next decade. In the 1970s, she shared a studio with Sam in Chicago's Pilsen neighborhood and they became more involved in the city's art scene. After Sam died in 1976, she enrolled in the MFA program at the University of Illinois at Chicago—studying with painter Morris Barazani—and took courses at the Art Institute of Chicago (AIC) with sculptor Abbott Pattison and painter Claude Bentley.

Over the next three decades, Himmelfarb showed widely in Chicago and the Midwest, including solo exhibitions at the University Club of Chicago, Cliff Dwellers Club, Sioux City Art Center, Jan Cicero Gallery (Chicago), South Shore Arts (indiana), and Gallery 72 (Omaha), among others; she was also selected for the AIC's 1985 "Chicago and Vicinity" show and "The Chicago Show" (1990) sponsored by the AIC and the Museum of Contemporary Art Chicago. Himmelfarb exhibited with Sam and son, John, at the Bradley Gallery (Milwaukee, 1974), Chicago's One Illinois Center (1975), the Quincy Art Center (1994), and the Evanston Art Center (1990), which held a retrospective of her work in 2000. In 2010, she was included posthumously in the show, "The New Moderns: In Search of Form," at the Lubeznik Center for the Arts and a show at the Elmhurst Art Museum. Her work belongs to many private and public collections, including the National Museum of Women in the Arts, Mary and Leigh Block Museum, Illinois State University, Lubeznik Center for the Arts, and Neiman Marcus Corporate Collection.

=== Artwork and reception ===
Himmelfarb's painting ranges along a continuum between stylized representation and abstraction that is nonetheless rooted in objective sources, such as the landscape, human figure, and architectural forms. Critics position her work in the modernist tradition of Picasso, Miró, Matisse and Hans Hofmann in terms of its commitment to formal structure and the play between figure and ground. Dialogue editor John Brunetti links her to contemporaries such as second-generation Abstract Expressionists Grace Hartigan and George McNeil, noting in their shared use of bold color, painterly surfaces and spatial ambiguity an interest in exploring "the metaphorical potential of the figure and landscape as seen through Modernism's distortions." Himmelfarb has said, "Ideas are the basis of my paintings. Subject matter enters, not as something to be represented, but as an instrument for conveying an idea." She described her expressive tools as the "interplay of opposites—abstraction with representation, organic with geometric, floating forms against those that are static, [and] color that moves around the canvas."

Eleanor Himmelfarb, Inside or Out?, acrylic on canvas, 38" x 48", 1999

Himmelfarb's earlier work often referenced experiences of daily existence and drew comparisons to medieval tapestries with its patterns of flattened forms, which some writers suggest were influenced by her studio view of woodlands through the frames of flat window planes. Reviewers particularly noted her concern for composition and subtle sense of color and depth; Chicago Tribune critic Alan Artner described her 1986 show as lyrical, with "soft lozenges of color" that were "decorative in the best sense." Her paintings in the 1990s employed gestural brushwork and free-floating imagery in fractured space, creating what curator Rene Paul Barilleaux called, "highly personal, often surreal renditions of nature" that "transcend the sense of tranquil isolation often associated with traditional landscape painting." Referencing natural and human iconography, works such as Summertime and Wintertime I (1990) and Ephemerae III (1993) suggested enigmatic aspects of the life cycle and the interconnectedness of the universe.

Eleanor Himmelfarb, Daily Bread, acrylic on canvas, 36" x 48", 2005

In the late 1990s and 2000s, Himmelfarb explored new imagery in increasingly dense, lattice-like compositions of shifting planes and overlapping shapes. Her "Alpha" series (1996–2003) used calligraphic letterforms from diverse alphabets to create kaleidoscopic patterns and tangled spatial planes; Japanese fans served as a launching point for her "Fans" series (2002–5). She introduced metaphors of passage with her "Gate" and "Fence" series (1998–2003), relating these barriers which physically invite or restrain to memories that arise and fade, and in formal terms, to shapes and colors that advance, retreat, ascend or descend. Critics noted in this work the emergence of color as an emotional force, capable suggesting the otherworldly glow of twilight or the hazy light of Indian summer in paintings such as Inside or Out? (1999) or Gate to the Prairie (1998). In late works (e.g., Daily Bread and Riviera, 2007), Himmelfarb developed a synthesis of earlier strategies and references, employing calligraphic and flat forms, stylized imagery, and outline in some of the most complex compositions of her career.

== Teaching ==
Himmelfarb taught painting and design for four decades, beginning at the Morton Arboretum in the 1950s. She instructed for more than 30 years (1967–2001)—into her early nineties—at the DuPage Art League in Wheaton, Illinois, mentoring some students for twenty years and providing a role model to women starting their art careers late in life due to family obligations. She also taught painting and design at Roosevelt University, Rosary College, Triton College, and the College of DuPage; in 1993, she was artist-in-residence at Illinois State University. According to students, Himmelfarb's methods were conversational, embedded in modernist fundamentals, and directed toward helping each artist express their own vision while also challenging them to take risks.

== Conservation work ==
Himmelfarb was a conservationist for many decades, including studies at the Morton Arboretum with naturalist May Watts, work with Roy Schulenberg to plant the Arboretum's Schulenberg Prairie—an early Midwest prairie restoration project, begun in 1962—and land protection efforts in the 2000s. She was a member of Winfield United, a group advocating responsible development, and when new developments began to encroach on the area, she worked with the Conservation Foundation in Illinois in 2003, at age 93, to establish a conservation easement that permanently limited development on her land; it was accepted in June 2005 by the Forest Preserve District of DuPage County. She also organized a meeting between the Conservation Foundation and her neighbors to educate them about easements; ultimately, several decided to establish them on their own properties. In 2003, she received the Foundation's "Open Space Award" in recognition of her efforts.

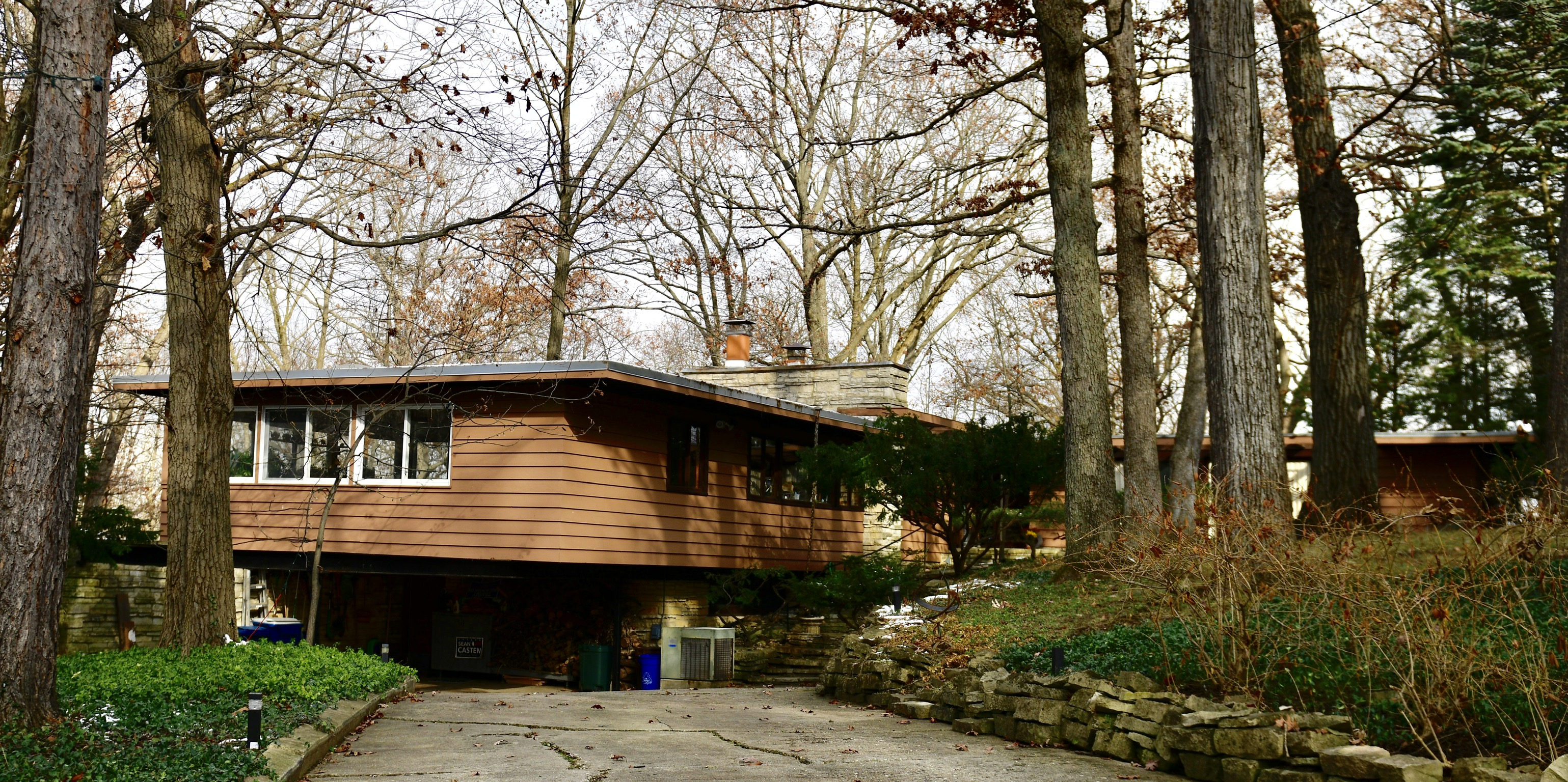
Samuel and Eleanor Himmelfarb Home and Studio, Winfield, Illinois, built 1942, National Register of Historical Places

== Samuel and Eleanor Himmelfarb Home and Studio ==
In the early 1940s, Himmelfarb helped her husband, Sam, design a house to be built in a wooded area of Winfield, Illinois. The design of the modernist, Usonian-influenced Samuel and Eleanor Himmelfarb Home and Studio (built in 1942) is influenced by the Bauhaus and architect Frank Lloyd Wright, and it is listed on the National Register of Historic Places. Eleanor provided input to Sam's design on the floor-to-ceiling studio windows facing the DuPage River and woodlands as well as on the scale of the house's various interior spaces. The house often hosted conservation and arts gatherings—including such guests as author-broadcaster Studs Terkel, sculptor Ruth Duckworth, film actor Lou Gilbert, and the touring cast of Thornton Wilder's original 1943 production of The Skin of Our Teeth. In 2007, the Himmelfarb Home and Studio was featured in a Chicago Bauhaus and Beyond tour of Modernism in Chicago's western suburbs.
