= Glen Ellyn Downtown South Historic District =

Historic district in Illinois, United States

- U.S. National Register of Historic Places
- U.S. Historic district
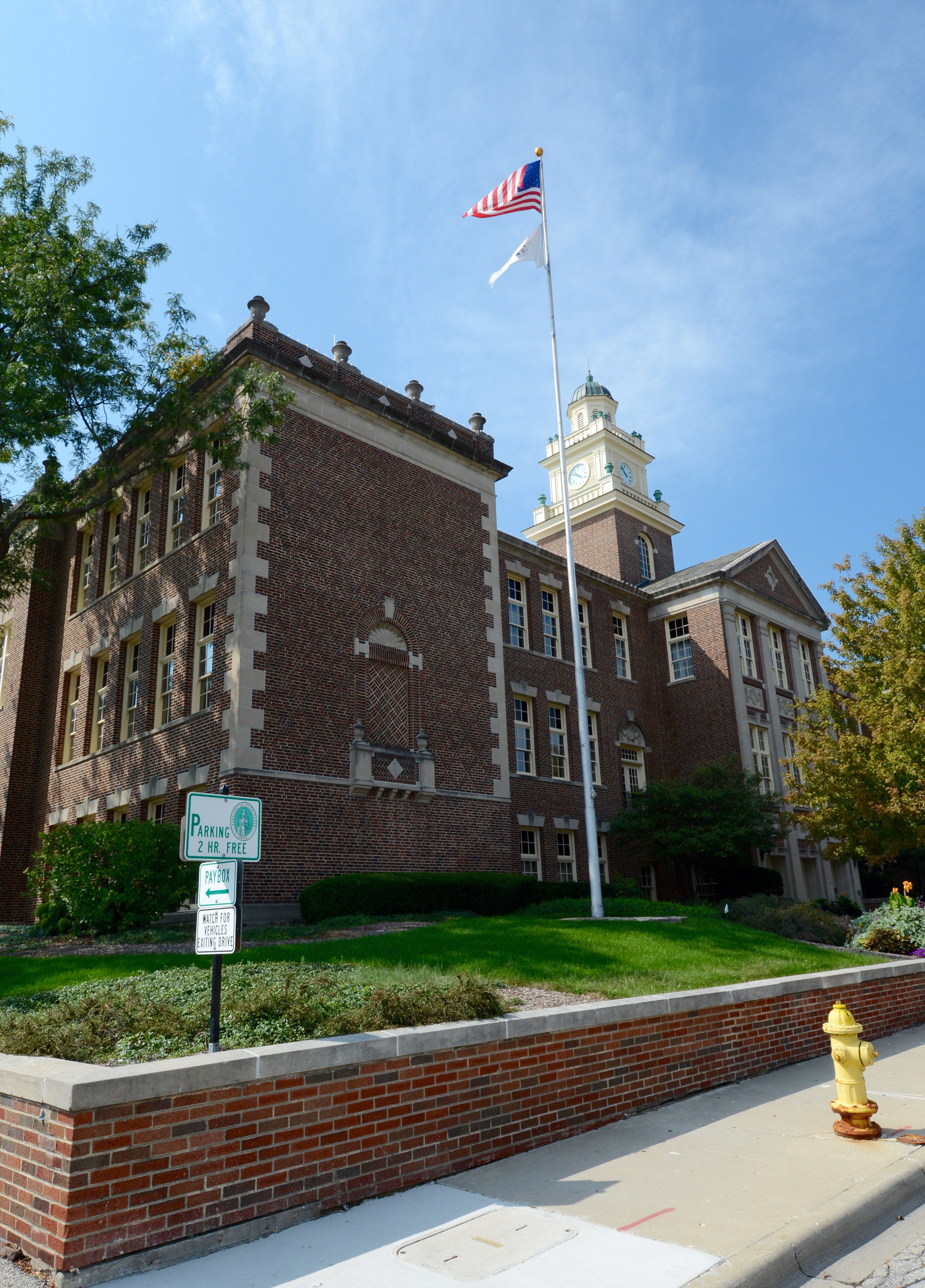
- Old Glen Ellyn Junior High School

- Location within Illinois Location within the United States
- Location: Main & Duane Sts., Hillside Ave. Glen Ellyn, DuPage County, Illinois, U.S.
- Coordinates: 41°52′30″N 88°3′58″W
- Architectural style: Classical Revival, Late Gothic Revival, Tudor Revival, Spanish Colonial Revival
- NRHP reference No.: 13000717
- Added to NRHP: September 18, 2013

The Glen Ellyn Downtown South Historic District is a historic commercial district in Glen Ellyn, Illinois, United States. Most of the district's growth dates from the 1920s. The architecture reflects several trends in the first half of the 20th century.

== History ==
Glen Ellyn, Illinois, was first settled in the 1830s. Early commercial developments, such as Stacy's Tavern, catered to stagecoach lines. The Galena and Chicago Union Railroad opened a station in the undeveloped area in 1849. The Downtown North district began to develop on the north side of the tracks at this time. The earliest non-residential construction south of the tracks began in 1859 with the opening of the Duane Street School. In 1891, the settlement changed its name to Glen Ellyn in response to the development of the Glen Ellyn Hotel & Springs Company resort at a nearby lake. The resort improved the town's reputation as an idyllic suburb and encouraged growth.

In the early 20th century, Glen Ellyn expanded quickly and began to expand its commercial district to the south side of the tracks. The Methodist Episcopal Church was completed at the corner of Duane Street and Forest Avenue in 1913; it was replaced in 1957. The first commercial building in the district was completed in 1923 for I. M. Block. In 1928, Piggly Wiggly opened a store at the corner of Main Street and Hillside Avenue in the Rohm Building. The largest development was the three-story Glen Ellyn Junior High School, which replaced the Duane Street School in 1929.

== Architecture ==
There are twenty buildings in the district, and all but one contribute to its historical integrity. The lone intrusion is a 1972 commercial block at 421 North Main Street.

- 503-505 Duane Street, 1926, two-part auto show room
- 530-532 Duane Street, 1953 with a c. 1880 house in the rear, one-part commercial block
- Glen Ellyn Junior High School, 1929, Classical Revival school designed by Norman Brydges
- First Methodist Episcopal Church, 1957 with 1930 educational building, church in the Late Gothic Revival style
- 520-526 Hillside Avenue, c. 1926–1930, one-part commercial block in the Tudor Revival style
- Rohm Building, 1928, one-part commercial block in the Tudor Revival style designed by Jean Rohm & Son
- F. T. Tomlins Building, 1926, two-part commercial block in the Tudor Revival style designed by L. O. Farnsworth
- Acadia Building, 1926, two-part commercial block in the Tudor Revival style designed by Betts & Holcomb
- 417 North Main Street, 1929 with 1962 alterations, one-part commercial block designed by J. B. Rohm & Sons
- 419 North Main Street, 1929, two-part commercial block in the Classical Revival style, designed by Houlihan, Hauser & Marks
- 423-425 North Main Street, 1954, one-part commercial block
- 426 North Main Street, 1929, one-part commercial block designed by Walker & Angel
- 427 North Main Street, c. 1926 with a c. 1880 house in the rear, one-part commercial block in the Spanish Revival style
- 428 North Main Street, 1959, one-part commercial block designed by Perkins, Norris & Molley
- 429-433 North Main Street, c. 1920, one-part commercial block in the Chicago School style
- 430 North Main Street, 1929, one-part commercial block
- 434-440 North Main Street, 1926, two-part commercial block in the Tudor Revival and Gothic Revival styles, designed by Charles H. Lenske
- 443-449 North Main Street, 1923, one-part commercial block in the Chicago School style
- 444 North Main Street, 1962, freestanding commercial building in the Colonial Revival style, designed by John F. Carson
