= John Himmelfarb =

American artist (born 1946)

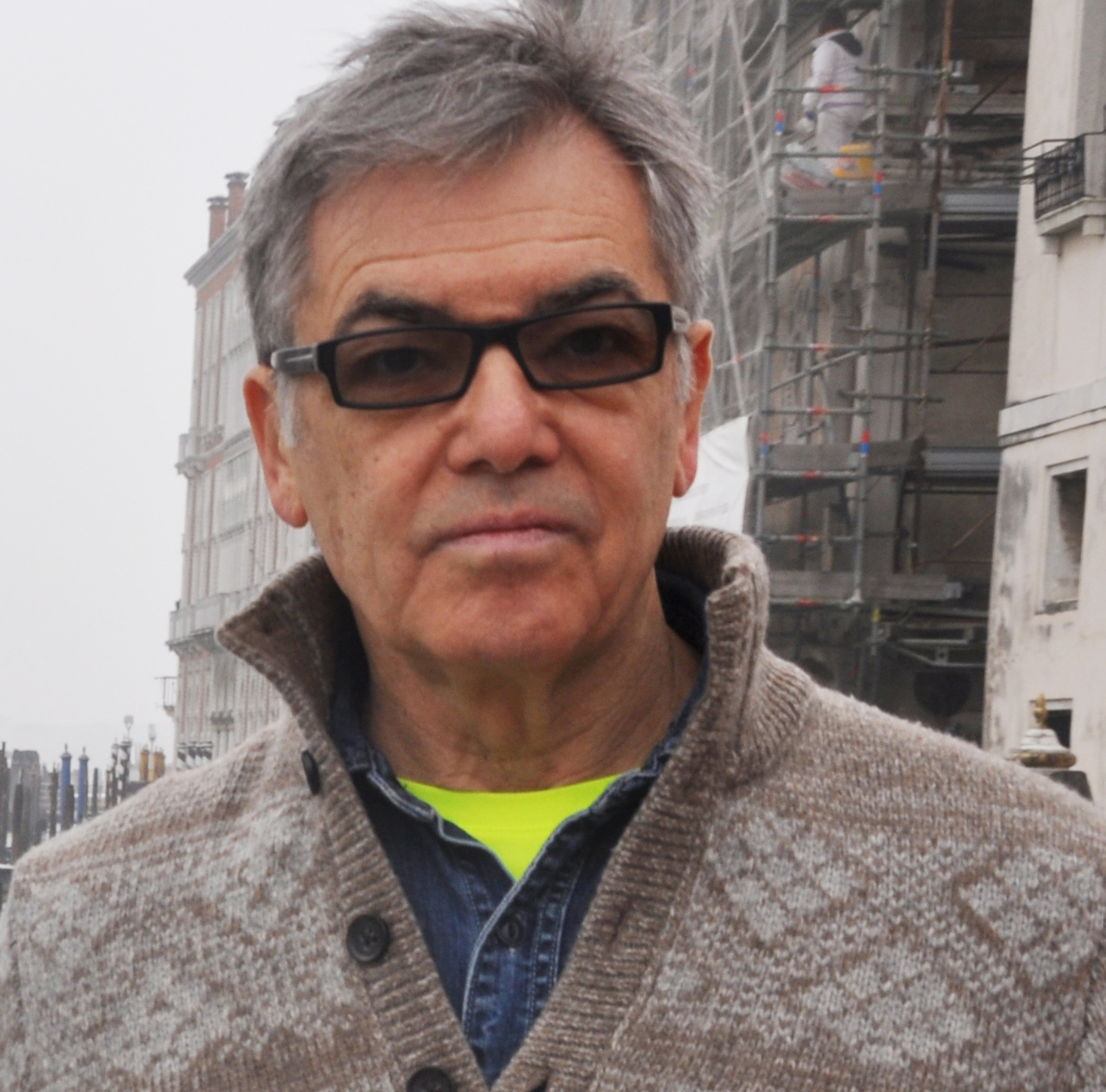
- Himmelfarb in Venice, Italy, February 2017
- Born: 1946 (age 79–80); Chicago, Illinois, US
- Education: Harvard College
- Known for: Drawing, Printmaking, Painting, Sculpture
- Spouse: Molly Day
- Website: johnhimmelfarb.com

John Himmelfarb (born 1946) is an American artist, known for idiosyncratic, yet modernist-based work across many media. Diverse influences ranging from Miró, Matisse and Picasso to Dubuffet, New York school artists like de Kooning, Guston, and Pop artists inform his work, described by critics and curators as chaotically complex and tightly constructed. He often employs energetic, gestural line, dense patterns of accumulated shapes, and fluid movement between figuration and abstraction, using strategies of concealment and revelation to create a sense of meaning that is both playful and elusive. His work is also unified by "a circulating library" of motifs and organizing structures, such as geographic and urban mapping, abstracted natural and industrial forms, and language systems. Assessing him at mid-career, New Art Examiner’s Andy Argy wrote "Himmelfarb’s art is original […] His unabashed immersion in graphic art, emphasizing drawing over painting, has earned him an important place among artists who make drawings into major aesthetic statements." Himmelfarb next turned to monumental paintings that critic Christopher Moore called joyful, luminous, and frenetic pyrotechnical displays. In 2006, he began to devote considerable studio time to sculpture that curator Gregg Hertzlieb described as an expression of the "human need for play and (our) enduring fascination with metamorphosis and transformation."

Himmelfarb has an extensive exhibition history, notably at the Terry Dintenfass and Luise Ross galleries (New York), Jean Albano Gallery (Chicago), Chicago Cultural Center, Kalamazoo Institute of Arts, Eskenazi Museum of Art (Indiana University, Bloomington), Brooklyn Museum, and Art Institute of Chicago. His work sits in more than fifty public collections in the US and abroad, including the Smithsonian American Art Museum, Bibliothèque nationale de France, British Museum, and High Museum of Art in Atlanta. He has been recognized with a Yaddo Fellowship and an Arts/Industry Residency at Kohler, Wisconsin, as well as grants from the National Endowment for the Arts, Pollock-Krasner Foundation, and Illinois Arts Council. Himmelfarb works and lives in Chicago and Spring Green, Wisconsin, with his wife, Molly Day.

== Life and career ==
John Himmelfarb was born in 1946 in Chicago, and grew up in rural Winfield Township, Illinois. His parents, Eleanor and Sam Himmelfarb, were both painters and his father also had an industrial design firm called 3-Dimensions. All three exhibited together on a few occasions. Museum visits, art-focused travels and serious conversations about art, music and literature were constants in Himmelfarb's early family life. In 1964, he enrolled at Harvard College with no intention of an art career. That changed after a junior-year independent study in drawing with sculptor Wil Reimann and encouragement from faculty artists Robert S. Neuman and Mirko Basaldella. By 1968, when he graduated with an Architectural Sciences Urban Planning degree, he had already decided to become an artist.

Intending to support his art by teaching, Himmelfarb enrolled in the Master of Arts in Teaching program at Harvard Graduate School of Education. In 1970, he completed his degree, and also met his future wife, Molly Day. After traveling abroad, he moved back to Chicago, worked out of his parents’ studio, and in his first studio sale, generated the proceeds to set up his own studio. In late 1971, he and Molly bought a house in Chicago's Pilsen neighborhood, and after marrying in 1972, remodeled the house into a combination home and studio. In the years that followed, they had two children, Forest, born in 1979 and now a businessman, and Serena, born in 1986, who is now also a painter.

Lacking the pedigree of an MFA or New York residence, Himmelfarb pursued his art career in an unusual way, with a kind of Midwestern practicality. He built his reputation with extended road trips, meeting individually with museum curators and gallery owners throughout the Midwest, and cultivating collectors through small showings in people's homes in places as far-flung as Omaha, Minneapolis, Erie, and Boston. His unorthodox strategy worked, long-term. By the late 1970s, he secured acquisitions from the Art Institute of Chicago and Smithsonian, and a widespread support base, which convinced Terry Dintenfass, Gallery 72 (Omaha), and Barbara Balkin (Chicago) to represent him. He also earned attention from critics such as New Art Examiner co-founder Jane Addams Allen and the Chicago Sun Times’ Harold Haydon, and shows at universities and museums across the Midwest. Later, he would show at the Luise Ross, Jean Albano and Thomas McCormick (Chicago), and Modern Arts Midtown (Omaha) galleries, and at museums such as the Jule Collins Smith Museum of Fine Art, Huntington Museum of Art (West Virginia), Davenport Museum of Art (Iowa), and Sioux City Art Center.

== Work ==
John Himmelfarb, 2/24/77, pen and ink on paper, 24" x 36", 1977.

Himmelfarb's relative distance from traditional art-world channels led his work in a similarly idiosyncratic direction, less focused on novelty or aesthetic polemics, and more on intuition, personal iconography and building on modernist tradition. With a "restless creative energy," he freely explored media—drawing, printmaking, painting, and more recently, sculpture, ceramics and tapestry—creating a highly diverse body of work consistent in its formal convictions and its humanistic preoccupations with humanity's relationship to nature (including its own), the organization of civilization, and the structures of visual communication and language. His work is perhaps best organized by major series, which tend to employ multiple media: 1) Early drawings and prints; 2) "Meetings"; 3) Language-related series; 4) "Inland Romance"; and 5) "Trucks."

=== Early drawings and prints ===
Himmelfarb initially focused on black-and-white ink drawings and prints of "piled-up complexity" that critics related to surrealist automatic drawing or magic-realism. In enigmatic works as large as four by eight feet, a restless, wiry contour line created a dynamic, shifting focus from macrocosm to microcosm, pattern to image, and abstraction to figuration, as animals, people, plants and structures emerged and de-materialized into an edge-to-edge, interlocking tapestry of organic and geometric shapes. Critics like Jane Addams Allen and Derek Guthrie saw in the maze of observation, incident and detail multiple levels of perception: a sense of nature "synonymous with rhythms of life"; a visualization of civilization reflecting Himmelfarb's urban planning studies; and a wry humor springing from juxtapositions of gesture, proportion and form. Harold Haydon wrote of his "astonishment at the artist’s inventive genius" and "endless satisfaction in deciphering imagery and discovering hidden humor and irony." In time, Himmelfarb expanded into color prints and paintings, including his early-1980s "Boatman," a cycle of more primitive works executed in slashing, swirling brushstrokes, that updated the classic "ship of fools" theme in works suggesting man "crowding himself into oblivion."

John Himmelfarb, Lumber Street Meeting, woodcut, 37" x 69", 1988.

=== "Meeting" series (1982–1990) ===
The "Meeting" series featured large-scale brush drawings, prints and paintings (up to seven-and-a-half by thirty-two feet) that intensified Himmelfarb's use of overall patterning, but developed a more dramatic narrative focus sometimes suggesting enlarged, elaborated details from the earlier drawings. Most often these works, such as Lava Flow (Meeting) Red (1986) or Lumber Street Meeting (1988), depicted a pair or trio of grotesque, totemic heads (usually a man in frontal and profile views and a snarling dog), rendered in choppy interlaced brushstrokes and searing colors against black, that emerged and disappeared out of writhing vegetation. While some critics detected the strain of "divided alter-egos" in the new work, others like Art in America’s Frederick Ted Castle saw "baroque brashness," engaging "human messiness" and a rich play of dualities: representation versus non-representation, confrontation versus resolution, man versus nature/beast, the integrated personality versus its parts. Andy Argy noted an intriguing play between form and image "suggesting a calligraphic version of an Abstract Expressionist gone haywire" that enabled the work to seem both serenely decorative and intensely expressionistic, and like Grimm or Andersen fairy tales, both humorous and scary.

=== Language-related works: "Icons" and "Puzzles" ===
John Himmelfarb, Motor Home, acrylic on canvas, 72" x 72", 2007.

Himmelfarb's fascination with language dates to his early Harvard days—when he invented his own pictorial alphabet—and sporadically resurfaced in drawings like 5/30/79 and his "Grid" works of the 1970s. In the 1990s, he began two series representing his deepest exploration of language, his remarkably varied "Icons" and "Puzzles." In these works, he created compositions resembling sacred scrolls, tablets, fragments of temple facades and everyday documents, fashioned from private, invented languages of pictograms, hieroglyphs and characters derived from Neolithic and religious symbols, ancient earth drawings, Asian and Arabic alphabets, and seal scripts that imply coherent statements, yet remain mysterious. Formally, the series relate back to Himmelfarb's early drawings in the tension between overall image and pattern, manipulation of positive and negative space, and exploration of visual structures—here, of language rather than social order. In "Icons" like Motor Home (2007) or the ceramic-tiled Coast of Chicago (2004)—a public commission for the Chicago Transit Authority's Kedzie Avenue subway stop—Himmelfarb worked in a simplified, graphic manner; in "Puzzle" works such as Jump, he accumulated more drawn detail in the fragments. Critic John Brunetti described them as "evocative gestalts of language, image, and thought," combining "unusual beauty" and "rigorous discipline," to suggest the physical and spiritual signatures left by past civilizations or the richness of life.

In 2003, Himmelfarb began translating his "Icons" into three dimensions, fashioning small-scale cast bronze, iron and aluminum sculptures out of his pictograms. Increasing the scale, he created the human-sized Duncan Gates (2008), two cast bronze gates commissioned for a privately owned sculpture park in Lincoln, Nebraska, and the outdoor, painted-metal sculpture Local Hero (2018), which also bears traces of his lattice-like "Inland Romance" paintings.

=== "Inland Romance" series (1993–2007) ===
John Himmelfarb, Oakton Circle, acrylic on canvas, 136" x 303.5", 2001.

The "Inland Romance" series reflects Himmelfarb's romantic attachment to Chicago and the Midwest. It incorporated abstracted elements inspired by the city's rhythm, density and industrial forms—bridges, ladders, ironworks, chimneys, cranes, scrap yards, often drawn as lattice-screens over modeled grounds—and passageways such as rivers, roads, maps and transportation lines. The Chicago Tribune’s Alan Artner and others also linked the series to Himmelfarb's calligraphic works, seeing a relationship between the lattice shapes and outlined magnifications of his hieroglyphs (as in Veneer Court, 1998) that suggested the monumental work of Franz Kline. In addition, a new lyricism and Abstract Expressionist painterliness came to the fore (e.g., Limestone Fox, 2000), along with his characteristically dynamic linework and dense, piled-on compositions. Critics typically noted the paintings’ exuberance, luminous color and frenzied rhythm, comparing them variously, to improvisational jazz, stained glass, mythical city plans, or tapestries depicting a journey.

Of particular note is the roughly eleven-foot by twenty-five-foot Oakton Circle (2001), a work that began as a blank canvas—mounted with two similar-sized works in Oakton College's Koehnline Museum of Art—that Himmelfarb executed as a public act of performance painting, beginning at his exhibit's opening September 6, 2001. Completed in the days after the September 11th attacks, the work drew equal attention from viewers both for Himmelfarb's high-pressure performance and for its emotionally charged color and dynamism on an epic scale.

=== "Trucks" (2004– ) ===
Himmelfarb's "Trucks" series represents a most improbable journey. It began unexpectedly one day after seeing a Dubuffet painting at the Art Institute of Chicago. Dubuffet employed a liquid black line over a multicolored background that electrified Himmelfarb. He immediately went to his studio to emulate the graphic impact on an "Inland Romance" painting. When a crane-like form emerged, he drew what appeared to be a truck below it (Bypass, 2003). In the next painting, Avion (2004), he dispensed with the crane and only a truck appeared. A new series was born which would expand to include drawings (many on old library catalogue cards), prints, and sculpture employing ceramics, wood, cast iron, steel, and eventually, 25-foot, drivable assemblages incorporating actual trucks, that critics have described collectively as whimsical, formally inventive. Curators would bring together this eclectic work in the touring museum exhibit, "Trucks" (2014–6).

John Himmelfarb, Penelope Awaiting Her Chamberlain, 1946 Chevrolet truck and welded salvaged objects, 138" x 300" x 104", 2013.

Himmelfarb initially focused on two-dimensional works that bore the influence of Dubuffet and Guston. But a 2007 residency at the Kohler Arts Center "Arts in Industry" program enabled Himmelfarb to seriously explore three-dimensional work. He began casting molten-like, expressionistic trucks that were sometimes indistinguishable from their freight, such as Greek Opera and Bird in Hand. In 2008, he made a huge leap, acquiring a 1946 International KB-1 pickup truck, along with a host of found objects—steel barrels, equipment, tools, pipes—that he welded together and painted stop-sign red to create the assemblage, Conversion. He followed with Galatea (2010), a work more essential in its forms and drivable, and later, with the widely traveled Penelope Awaiting Her Chamberlain (2013), a mobile work using a 1946 Chevrolet farm truck that references the mythological Penelope and assemblage sculptor John Chamberlain. Despite their more literal references, Himmelfarb's "Trucks" function much like his other work, freely shifting from familiar to strange, functional to artistic, industrial to whimsical, with the trucks serving largely as "carriers" of form (colors and shapes) and meaning (stand-ins representing human qualities reflected in titles such as Charity, Dedication, or Forbearance).

== Collections and recognition ==
Himmelfarb's work sits in more than fifty public collections in the US and abroad, including: the Art Institute of Chicago, La Bibliothèque Nationale de France, British Museum, Smithsonian American Art Museum, Museo Nacional de la Estampa (Mexico City), Total Museum of Contemporary Art (Seoul), Brooklyn Museum, High Museum of Art, Huntington Museum of Art, Joslyn Art Museum, Portland Art Museum, and Sioux City Art Center, among many. He has also created public art projects for the City of Chicago Public Library, Boston Logan Airport, Chicago Transit Authority, University of Nebraska, and Art Omaha.

Himmelfarb has been recognized with a Yaddo Fellowship (1979), as well as grants from the National Endowment for the Arts (1982, 1985), the Pollock-Krasner Foundation (1986, 2002), the Illinois Arts Council (1986, 2003), and Chicago Artists Abroad (1989). He has been chosen for residencies by the Kohler Arts/Industry Program (Kohler, Wisconsin) and the Emily Harvey Foundation (Venice, Italy). He has also been honored as a Visiting Artist at more than thirty institutions and universities, including University of Wisconsin-Madison, University of Canterbury (Christchurch, New Zealand), Indiana University, University of Nebraska–Lincoln, and University of Chicago, among many.
