= John Pentecost =

John Pentecost may refer to:

- John Pentecost (cricketer) (born 1857), Kent cricketer
- J. Dwight Pentecost (1915–2014), American Christian theologian
- John Pentecost (American football) (born 1943), offensive guard for the Minnesota Vikings

== See also ==
- John L. Pentecost House, a historic residence located in Elmhurst, Illinois
