= Central DuPage Hospital =

Northwestern Medicine Central DuPage Hospital
- Northwestern Medicine
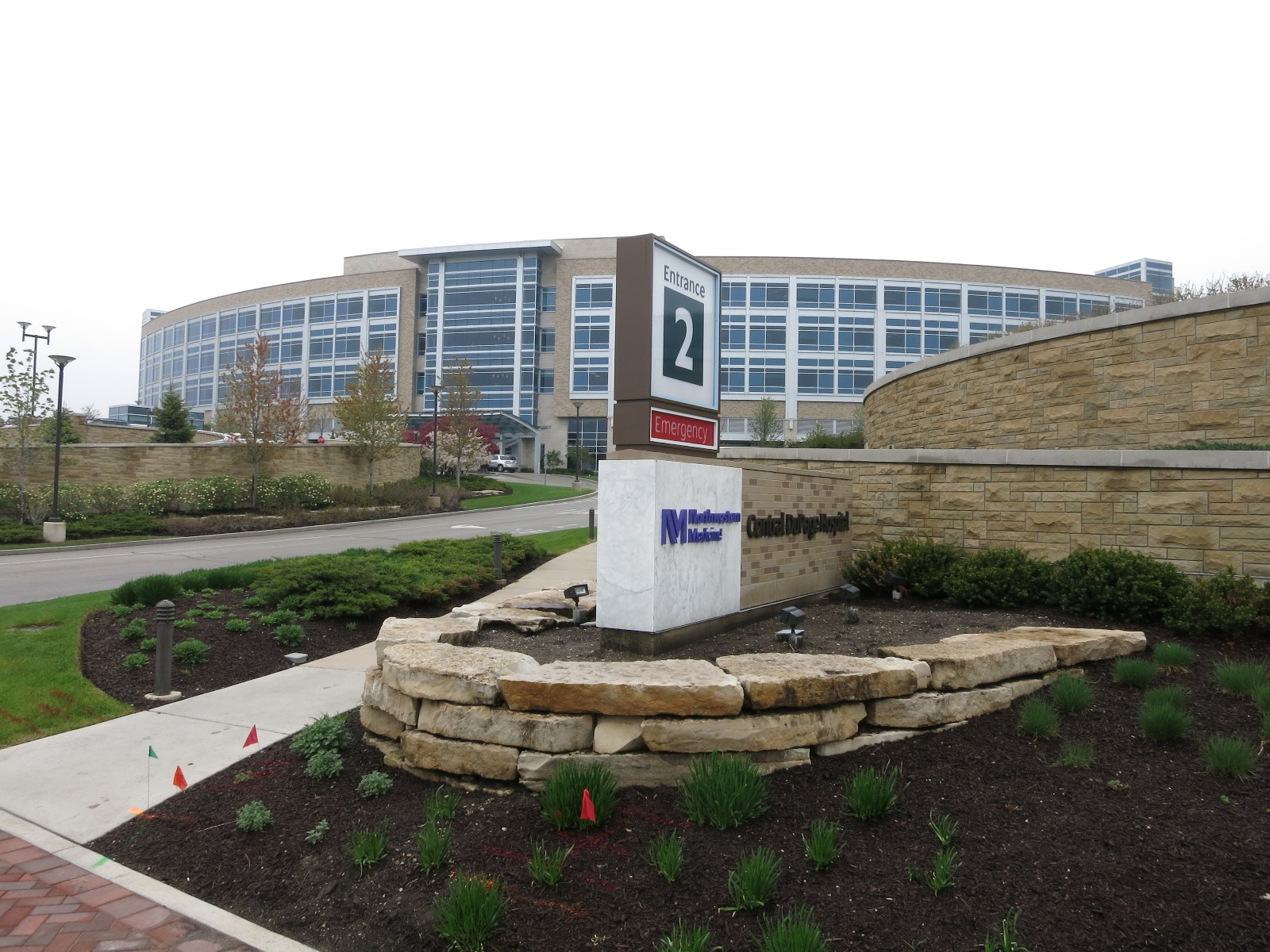
- Central Dupage Hospital on Winfield Road at High Lake Road

Geography
- Location: 25 North Winfield Road, Winfield, Illinois, United States
- Coordinates: 41°52′27″N 88°09′23″W

Organization
- Type: General
- Affiliated university: Feinberg School of Medicine, Northwestern University
- Patron: Northwestern Memorial Foundation
- Network: Northwestern Medicine

Services
- Emergency department: Level II trauma center
- Beds: 390

Helipads
- Helipad: (FAA LID: IS39)
| Number | Length | | Surface |
| Number | ft | m | Surface |
|---|---|---|---|
| H1 | 60 | 18 | CONC |

History
- Former name: Winfield Sanitarium
- Opened: 1958, opened September 16, 1964

Links
- Website: www.nm.org/locations/central-dupage-hospital
- Lists: Hospitals in Illinois

Northwestern Medicine Central DuPage Hospital (CDH) is a 390-bed hospital in Winfield, Illinois, United States, one of twelve hospitals operated by Northwestern Medicine. CDH was the first hospital in DuPage County to perform open heart surgery and the first to perform closed-chest, robot-assisted cardiac bypass surgery in the State of Illinois. The hospital was one of the first in Illinois to use endoscopic radial artery harvesting led by Dr. Marc Gerdisch. As a Level III Perinatal center it has maternal fetal medicine specialists and a Level III Neonatal Intensive Care Unit staffed by Lurie Children's Hospital neonatologists. The hospital houses Illinois' first intraoperative MRI unit used for brain surgery. Designated as a Comprehensive Stroke Center CDH cares for stroke patients in the region. In support of stroke patients was the initiation of the first Mobile Stroke Unit in Illinois under the leadership of Dr. Harish Shownkeen - neuroradiologist.As of 2025, the hospital was ranked 7th on the "Best Hospitals in Illinois" list by U.S. News & World Report, ranked High Performing ng in 5 adult specialities and 14 procedures/conditions.

== History ==
The Central DuPage Hospital Association was established in 1958 when citizens from Glen Ellyn, Lombard, Wheaton, Warrenville, Winfield and West Chicago banded together to restore a sanitarium located on the hospital's current primary site. After an extensive million-dollar renovation project, Central DuPage Hospital opened on September 16, 1964 with 113 beds and 66 physicians. The hospital saw much change throughout the 1970s, with the opening of a 120-bed pavilion on December 13, 1970, small additions in 1971 and 1972, and a five-story 112-bed patient tower in 1976. The facility and campus continued to expand in the decades that followed, with much of the original structure eventually reused or demolished, culminating in the construction of a new $232 million five-story bed tower with 202 private rooms in 2011.

In 2011, Central DuPage Health (the successor parent to the Central DuPage Hospital Association) merged with Delnor Health System, the parent of Delnor Hospital of Geneva, Illinois, to form Cadence Health System. Cadence, in turn, was then acquired by Northwestern Memorial HealthCare, parent of Chicago's Northwestern Memorial Hospital, in 2015.

== Awards and rankings ==
- 100 Top Hospitals by Truven Health Analytics (2006-2010, 2012, 2013, 2014, 2015)
- The LeapFrog Group Top Hospital (2014)
- Nationally Ranked for Orthopaedic Care by U.S. News & World Report (2009, 2012, 2013, 2014)
- Magnet Recognition For Nursing Excellence (2010)

== Services ==
- Community Health & Outreach
- Diabetes Education
- Diagnostic Imaging Services
- Dialysis Services
- Emergency & Trauma Services
- Employee Assistance Program
- Endoscopy Services
- Fitness & Wellness Services
- Home Health & Hospice Services
- Infusion Services
- Lab Services
- Nutrition Services
- Occupational Health Services
- Pain Management Services
- Rehabilitation Services
- Senior Services
- Surgical Services
- Travel Medicine & Immunization Services
- Walk-In Clinics
- Wound Care Services

== Primary care services ==
- Northwestern Medicine Regional Medical Group
- Family Medicine
- Internal Medicine
- Obstetrics & Gynecology
- Pediatrics

== Specialized care ==
- Behavioral Health
- Northwestern Medicine Regional Medical Group
- Cancer (Oncology)
- Heart & Vascular
- Neurosciences
- Orthopedics
- Palliative Medicine
- Pediatric Specialty Care
- Respiratory Health
- Weight Management
- Women's Health
