= Sam Himmelfarb =

American painter and commercial designer

- Born: July 4, 1904; Russian Empire
- Died: December 17, 1976 (aged 72); Chicago, Illinois, US
- Education: Art Students League of New York, National Academy of Design, Wisconsin School of Fine and Applied Arts
- Known for: Painting, exhibit design
- Style: Modernism, Realism, Figurative
- Spouse(s): Irene Donnelly (1926–1937); Eleanor Gorecki Himmelfarb (1939–1976)
- Website: Sam Himmelfarb

Sam Himmelfarb (July 4, 1904 – December 17, 1976) was a Russian-born American artist and commercial exhibit designer, known for his modernist-influenced paintings of everyday people and urban scenes. He also designed the Frank Lloyd Wright-inspired Samuel and Eleanor Himmelfarb Home and Studio (built 1942) in Winfield, Illinois, which is listed on the National Register of Historic Places. Himmelfarb studied art at the Art Students League and National Academy of Design in New York and at the Wisconsin School of Fine and Applied Arts. He initially painted in a realist style influenced by the Ashcan School, which gave way to more modernist, increasingly abstract styles. His paintings appeared in exhibitions at the Art Institute of Chicago (AIC), Terra Museum of American Art, Milwaukee Art Institute, and Arts Club of Chicago, and in circulating shows from the American Federation of Arts, among other venues. He received awards from the AIC, Wisconsin State Fair and Milwaukee Art Museum, and his work belongs to the collection of the latter, and those of the Illinois State Museum, Block Museum, and Arkansas Art Center, among others. Himmelfarb was married to the artist and educator, Eleanor Himmelfarb (1910-2009); their son, John Himmelfarb (b. 1946), and grandchild, Serena Aurora Day Himmelfarb (b. 1986), are also artists.

== Life ==
Sam Himmelfarb, Road House, oil on canvas, 29" x 26", 1927

Samuel Himmelfarb was born in Latvia to Jewish parents in 1904. In 1905, they immigrated to the United States, but soon after, Himmelfarb's mother died during childbirth in New York City. He and his father, Chaim, moved on to Wisconsin, settling in Racine and then Milwaukee. Himmelfarb took weekend art classes at the Layton School of Art and attended an art summer camp, meeting lifelong friend and future WPA muralist, Schomer Lichtner. In high school, he learned to play the drums and by the early 1920s was performing semi-professionally in local vaudeville acts, dance music ensembles, and on a Pacific cruise ship; large crowds and musicians would later serve as subjects for many of his paintings.

After high school, Himmelfarb studied art at the University of Wisconsin–Madison (1924)—forging relationships with artists such as Ben Shahn—and at the Wisconsin School of Fine and Applied Arts, working under German-born landscape artist Gustave Moeller. In 1926, he hitchhiked to New York to study at the National Academy of Design and the Art Students League, where he took classes, respectively, with artists Charles Webster Hawthorne and Boardman Robinson, and was influenced by the older Ashcan School artists. He supported himself with two jobs, as a drummer—playing a 16-show run for big band leader Horace Heidt and gigs with Jimmy Durante—and an architect's apprentice on projects for Long Island homes and the Empire State Building. He also met and married Irene Donnelly in 1926, and they had a daughter, Nell, in 1933. They moved to the Midwest in the 1930s, and Himmelfarb focused on commercial three-dimensional design work, creating window displays for Mandel Brothers department store and exhibits for the 1933 A Century of Progress Exposition in Chicago. In 1937, he founded his own industrial exhibit company, Three Dimensions, which would support a fine art career that he pursued painting three days each week; exhibit clients included Union Pacific Railroad, Parker Brothers, General Motors, and Motorola, among others. By this time, Himmelfarb's marriage had become strained and that same year he and Irene divorced.

Himmelfarb was part of a socially conscious group of Midwest modernists that included Mitchell Siporin, Julio de Diego, Macena Barton, and Milwaukee-based Joseph Friebert, among others. He was active in antifascist groups and in the Arts Club of Chicago and Artists Equity (serving as president in the 1950s); he often delivered lectures to civic groups, such as “Don’t Look Now, But Your Modern Art is Showing.” At a Hyde Park activist meeting in the late 1930s, Himmelfarb met Eleanor Gorecki. Their relationship became serious, and he and Gorecki married in 1939, remaining so until Sam's death in 1976. In 1940, they purchased an undeveloped property in a not-yet residential section of rural Winfield, Illinois, planning to settle there and raise a family closer to nature. By late 1942, they built and moved into a self-designed, Usonian-style house there, now listed on the National Register of Historic Places. In the following years, they had two children, Susan (b. 1943) and John (b. 1946).

== Art career ==
Sam Himmelfarb, Front Row at the Beach, oil on canvas, 24" x 36", 1955

Himmelfarb's art evolved throughout his five-decade career, from Ashcan School-influenced urban realism in the 1920s, through more expressionist work in the 1940s and 1950s, to increasingly abstract paintings in the 1960s and 1970s that incorporated Abstract expressionist and Pop influences. Certain concerns, however, remained consistent in his work: a modernist visual aesthetic dedicated to the notion of the integrated artwork; subject matter rooted, even in his more abstract work, to narrative and the objective world; and a preoccupation with scenes celebrating ordinary people and everyday life. Curator Rene Paul Barilleaux suggests that Himmelfarb engages viewers through common, recognizable experiences "transformed into dynamically rendered and visually charged images." In interviews, Himmelfarb explained, "I record the unprogrammed, the unglorified, the casual human scene […] a tune in praise of the unspectacular.”

Himmelfarb exhibited widely from the 1920s through the 1950s, at the Wisconsin Painters and Sculptors Exhibitions (early 1920s, 1938), shows at the Arts Club of Chicago (1952–9) and Renaissance Society (1958), and national and international circulating shows organized by the American Federation of Arts (1953) and Art Institute of Chicago (1958–9, curated by Katharine Kuh). He was selected for numerous Art Institute of Chicago invitational and "Chicago and Vicinity" shows (1936–1957), including its 1951 "Annual American Exhibition." In 1949, he won the museum's Broadus James Clarke Memorial Prize for his casein work, Men on a Boat. Notable solo shows were held for Himmelfarb at the Milwaukee Art Institute (1932), Panoras Gallery (New York, 1956), Frank Ryan Gallery (Chicago, 1958), and Charles Allis Art Museum (Milwaukee, 1969).

In the 1970s, Himmelfarb showed with his wife Eleanor and son John at the Bradley Gallery (Milwaukee, 1974) and Chicago's One Illinois Center (1975). They were also exhibited together in later shows at the Evanston Art Center (1990) and Quincy Art Center (1994). More recently, Himmelfarb's work has been featured in the surveys, "Chicago Modern, 1893-1945: Pursuit of the New" (Terra Museum, 2004) and "Figurism: Narrative and Fantastic Figurative Art from the Illinois State Museum Collection" (2012).

=== Work and reception ===
Art historians often compare Himmelfarb's early work of the 1920s and 1930s to that of Ashcan school artists, such as John Sloan. Discussing Himmelfarb’s painting, Road House (1927), Patricia Smith Scanlan identifies its similar "dark-toned urban realism" and informal setting—a humble roadside bar populated with disinterested subjects—while also noting the subtle influence of French modernism in its plunging perspective, strong lighting effects, and loose brushwork. In Chicago Modern, 1893-1945: Pursuit of the New, Amy Galpin and Susan Weininger suggest that Himmelfarb's rapid brushwork and spontaneous paint application portray the "vitality and dynamism of the modern city."

Sam Himmelfarb, Downtown, oil and collage, 40" x 56", 1960

Himmelfarb's work of the 1940s retained his interest in observing and recording everyday life, but increasingly, displayed a greater emphasis on formal aspects over representation. For example, in L (1941) and Commuters (1945)—which depicts four men playing cards on their way to work—critics note modernist features such as flattened space, bold outlines, and blocky, unmodulated areas of color that create a Cézanne-like play of geometric shapes on the heads and bodies of figures and their surroundings.

Sam Himmelfarb, Diagonals in Orange and White acrylic on canvas, 48" x 60", 1969

In his 1950s, Himmelfarb continued to focus on crowds, such as audiences, commuters and beachgoers. However, in paintings such as Poet and Paysano (1950), Front Row at the Beach (1955) and Mosaic (1957), he began to experiment with stylized flat or angular, Cubist-like shapes, brighter color, patterned surfaces and a fragmented, reordered sense of space. Arts Magazine went so far as to describe one such work, The Rapid Summer Died, as one of the more remarkable "abstractions" in a group show of "vigorous and lushly colored" oils. By 1960's Downtown and 1961’s Neighborhood Street Scene, Himmelfarb was employing collage—in part, reflecting the fragmented nature of his new compositions—in a manner that recalled both the abstraction of Hans Hofmann and the Pop, representational-abstract silkscreens of Robert Rauschenberg.

Himmelfarb retired from business in 1966 and focused full-time on painting, taking a studio in Chicago's Pilsen neighborhood that he found through friend and modernist sculptor, Ruth Duckworth; he would share the studio with Eleanor and John in the early 1970s. His late work alternated between abstracted, painterly pieces, such as On the Way (1965) or Sun Bleached (1969), and high-key, geometric syntheses of recreational, domestic or urban scenes, often executed in acrylic (e.g., Family Feast, 1971; In, 1972). In these works, he often applied paint in a cool, almost mechanical manner, creating clean-edged, flat areas of interlocking forms that consciously used negative space and sometimes formed graphic patterns of striping and outlining (e.g., Truck Stop Diner, 1968; Diagonals in Orange and White, 1969). Critic Donald Key described his work of this period as that of "an accomplished colorist" who "revels in the rhythms of opposing tones and color."

Himmelfarb designed the modernist, Usonian-style Samuel and Eleanor Himmelfarb Home and Studio, which was built in 1942 in a wooded area of Winfield, Illinois, and listed on the National Register of Historic Places on October 4, 2018. In subsequent years, Himmelfarb occasionally undertook other building projects, including a residence in Wheaton, Illinois built for friends (since demolished), a still-surviving, small medical office in Warrenville, Illinois, and design work for a neighboring house in Winfield.
