= George Baker House =

Historic house in Illinois, United States

- U.S. National Register of Historic Places
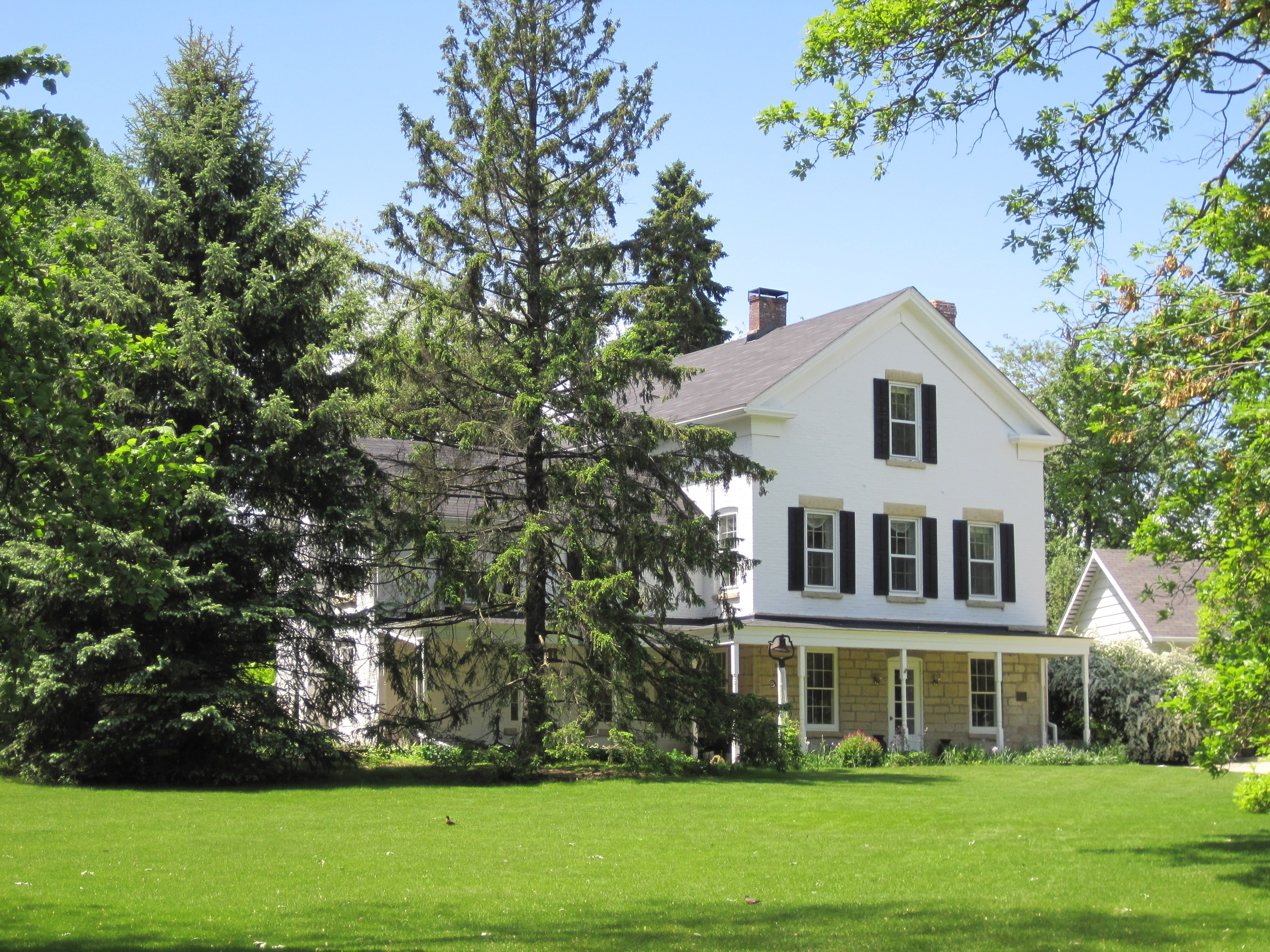
- George Baker House in 2011

- Location within Illinois Location within the United States
- Location: 1 S. 500 Taylor Rd. Glen Ellyn vicinity, DuPage County, Illinois, U.S.
- Coordinates: 41°51′1.5″N 88°3′20.5″W
- Built: 1847
- Architect: George Baker
- Architectural style: Greek Revival
- NRHP reference No.: 10000038
- Added to NRHP: March 1, 2010

The George Baker House is a historic residence in unincorporated Milton Township near Glen Ellyn, Illinois. The Greek Revival house features a limestone exterior on a stone foundation, and an asphalt roof. It was constructed for and designed by George Baker in 1847. It was listed on the National Register of Historic Places in 2010.

== History ==
Following the end of the Black Hawk War, settlers began to move to the Chicago region, including DuPage County. Valentine Baker, a French immigrant, moved to the region from New York in 1843. John Russ purchased an unsettled lot on a hill from the federal government on May 2, 1843, and sold it to the Baker family on August 9. Valentine Baker died in 1846, before he could build a house on the lot. His 20-year-old son George took over the responsibility, and the house was completed in 1847. It was built halfway between Stacy's Tavern and Lisle on Park Boulevard. The road was originally an Indian trail that became an important north–south thoroughfare. George Baker married Mary Forttman on January 11, 1848. They expanded the lot to include 392.5 acres (158.8 ha) of farmland. They had seven children together. A wing was added to the house in 1853. George Barker was buried next to his father on the property in 1873. The farm was passed down to George's son Valentine, who was the last family member to hold the land. It was deeded to John H. and Christopher W. Stauch in 1892, who combined the property with their existing land.

The house became dilapidated, and remained abandoned until it was purchased in 1942 by Frederic and Helen Babcock. Frederic was an editor for the Chicago Tribune who rehabilitated properties. In 1965, part of the property was sold to the town of Glen Ellyn to build Glencrest Middle School. The house was listed on the National Register of Historic Places by the National Park Service on March 1, 2010. The hill that the house stood on retained the name of Baker Hill, which recently lent its name to a nearby shopping center.

== Architecture ==
The George Baker House is a Greek Revival style farmhouse. The 1853 addition converted the house into an Upright and Wing configuration. The house is on the west side of Taylor Road at its intersection with McCormock Avenue just west of Illinois Route 53. It is built into the hillside of Baker Hill, with entrances on the first floor on the east and the second floor on the west. The three-story brick house is painted white with a partially exposed limestone foundation. The main entrance on the east side has a large porch; the historic main entrance was probably on the west. Windows are surrounded by brick lintels and limestone sills; the west windows have black shutters. Both doors have six-over-six windows on either side. The second floor has three windows on the east side, and side windows on the north and south. The addition has a door and window on the south side and a door and two windows on the east. There are two smaller windows on the west side of the addition. Two ground-level windows are also present on the west.

There was originally two rooms on the first floor. The east room had a chimney in the center and a staircase leading to the kitchen below. Next to the rooms is a small hall with stairs to the second floor. The hall also led to a bathroom and an entrance to the kitchen. The largest room on the second floor is on the east. The north side features two small rooms. On the west is a bedroom and a bathroom. The main hall has a stairway to the third floor, which was probably originally a single room, but has been converted into two. In the first floor of the addition, the dining room has a maple floor. The kitchen was also relocated here to the south; it was originally a pair of pantries, but was converted in the 20th century. A root cellar is on the west. A hall runs on the second floor to two bedrooms.
