= Samuel and Eleanor Himmelfarb House and Studio =

- Himmelfarb, Samuel and Eleanor House and Studio
- U.S. National Register of Historic Places
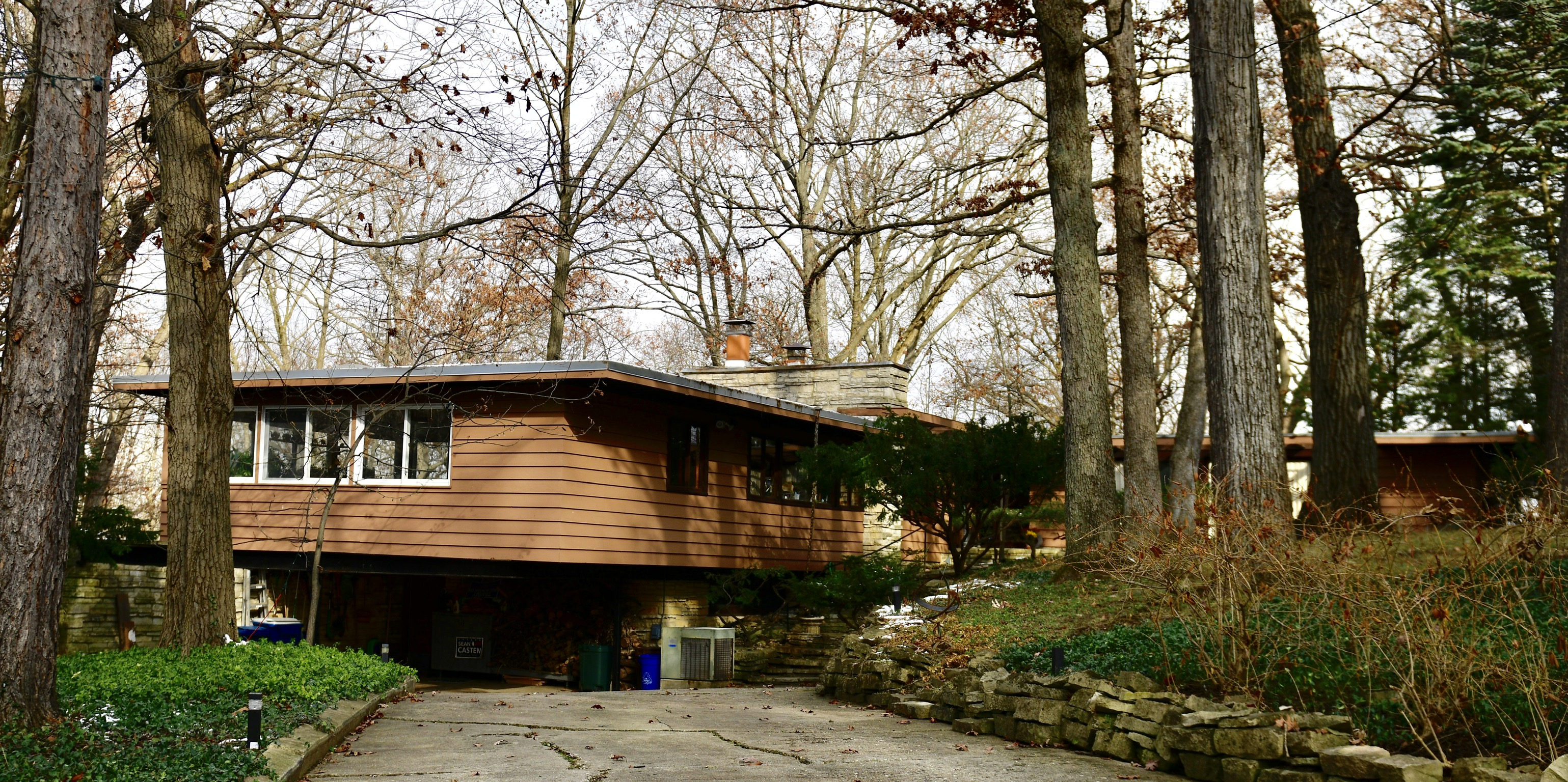
- Samuel and Eleanor Himmelfarb Home and Studio, Winfield, Illinois, built 1942, National Register of Historical Places

- Location within Illinois
- Location: 28W 120 Marion Rd., Winfield, Illinois
- Coordinates: 41.86534°N 88.16854°W
- Area: 4.2 acres (1.7 ha)
- Architect: Sam Himmelfarb
- Architectural style: Modernist
- NRHP reference No.: 100002417
- Added to NRHP: October 4, 2018

The Samuel and Eleanor Himmelfarb Home and Studio is a modernist, Usonian-style studio designed by Russian-born American designer Sam Himmelfarb, which was built in 1942 in a wooded area of Winfield, Illinois, and listed on the National Register of Historic Places on October 4, 2018. Along with his wife Eleanor's input, Himmelfarb drew on modernist influences, such as the Bauhaus, and two Frank Lloyd Wright homes in Madison, Wisconsin: the First Jacobs House (1937) and the John Pew House (1938–40). These influences are reflected in the structure's exposed building materials, simple geometry, and lack of ornament, as well as its horizontal lines, straight-forward schematics, floor-to-ceiling glazed walls, and placement on an undulating natural lot.

Himmelfarb modified Wright's L-shape footprint design for the Jacobs House, adding a studio wing set at an oblique angle to the rest of the home to create a Y-shape. The property's rolling terrain requires the one-story building to cantilever over the hillside on two ends, supported by stone piers and steel beams. He and Eleanor planned for window walls that incorporate views of the forest landscape beyond the property line. The home's interior features a fireplace at the center of the living room, a garden-like space inside the elbow bend at the house's front, outdoor terraces, and an open carport. Construction on the house began in January 1942, and was largely completed by November that year.

In 2007, the Himmelfarb Home and Studio was featured in a Chicago Bauhaus and Beyond tour of Modernism in Chicago’s western suburbs.

== See also ==
- National Register of Historic Places in DuPage County, Illinois
