= Randecker's Hardware Store =

- U.S. National Register of Historic Places
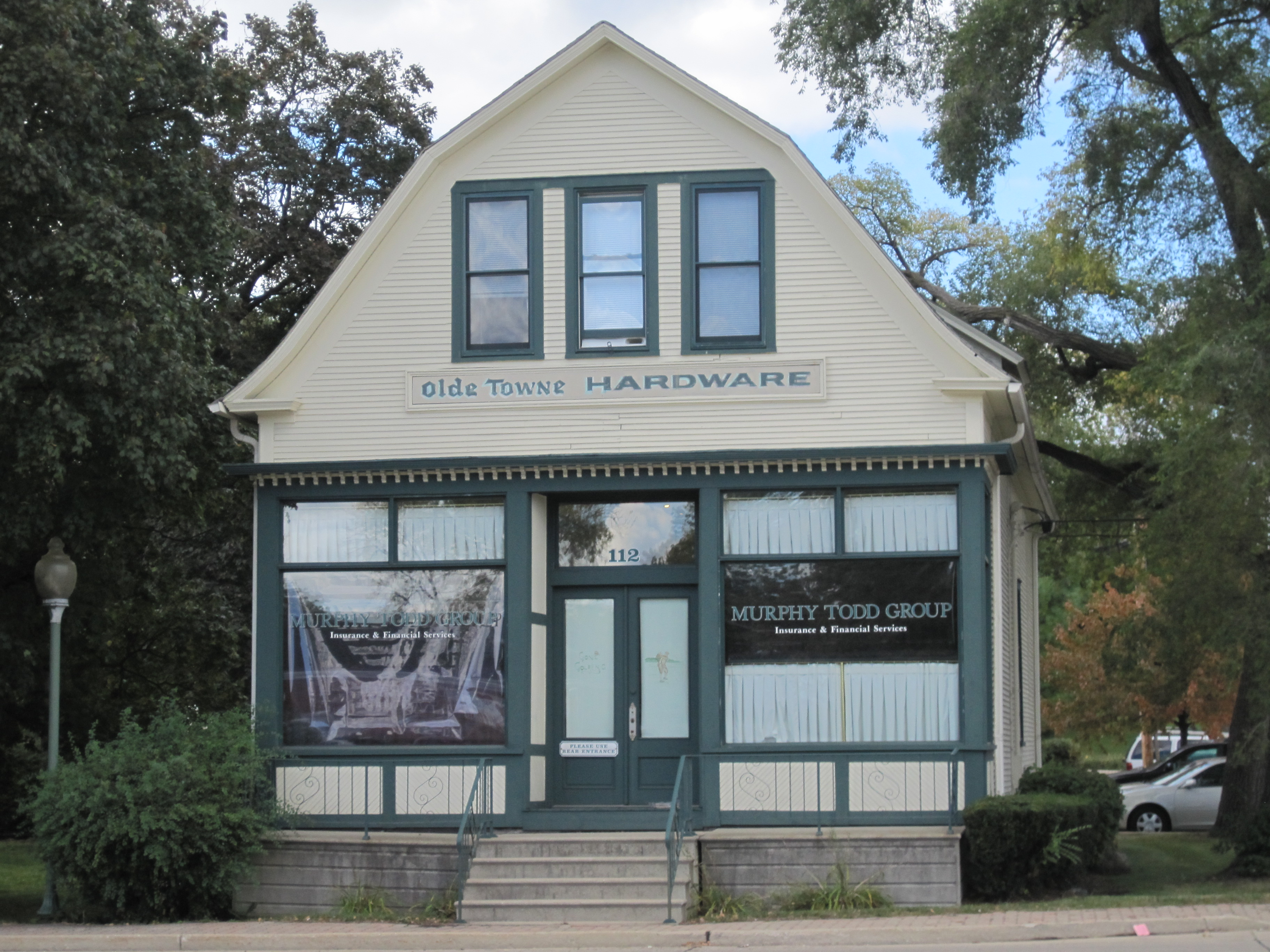

- Location within Illinois Location within the United States
- Location: 112 S. Bloomingdale Rd. Bloomingdale, DuPage County, Illinois, U.S.
- Coordinates: 41°57′23″N 88°4′53″W
- Built: 1908–09
- Architectural style: Commercial style
- NRHP reference No.: 94001265
- Added to NRHP: October 28, 1994

Randecker's Hardware Store is a historical Commercial style building in Bloomingdale, Illinois.

== History ==
The store was built in 1908–09 to sell goods to local farmers and residents. William Randecker opened to store after wanting to leave the paint business following his deteriorating health. Randecker was a prominent figure in Bloomingdale Township, functioning as the township clerk for twenty years and township collector for an additional five. Early 20th century demands for electrical and plumbing equipment fueled the success of the family-run store. When Bloomingdale was incorporated as a village in 1923, Randecker's was one of 13 commercial establishments in the city. Randecker died in 1946 and passed the store on to his nephew, George Bender, who renamed the store Bender's Hardware. The post office co-inhabited the building from 1955 to 1960. The property was sold to the Mazzarella family following Bender's death in 1976. The store was mostly converted into an antique shop with limited hardware supply. It was added to the National Register of Historic Places on October 28, 1994. It currently operates as a MassMutual insurance office.

== Architecture ==
Randecker's Hardware Store is a 1 1/2-story building at the southwest corner of Bloomingdale Road and Franklin Street. It is painted white with trim around windows painted dark green. The main facade faces east toward Bloomingdale Road. Randecker's house, built at the same time as the store, is to the south. The wood building is 24 by 54 feet (7.3 m × 16.5 m) and is on a stone and concrete block foundation. The roof is a gambrel with asphalt shingles. Five steps lead to a balcony porch that spans the width of the main facade. This balcony was originally wood, but has since been replaced with concrete. The entrance is a double door, each with a 4-foot (1.2 m) pane of glass. The door is flanked with large show windows. A pair of smaller rectangular windows sits on top of each show window; these windows sit beneath a wooden cornice. Three one-over-one double hung windows are found on the attic floor facing east. Just beneath these windows is a sign reading "Olde Towne HARDWARE".
