= Glen Ellyn Downtown North Historic District =

Historic district in Illinois, United States

- U.S. National Register of Historic Places
- U.S. Historic district
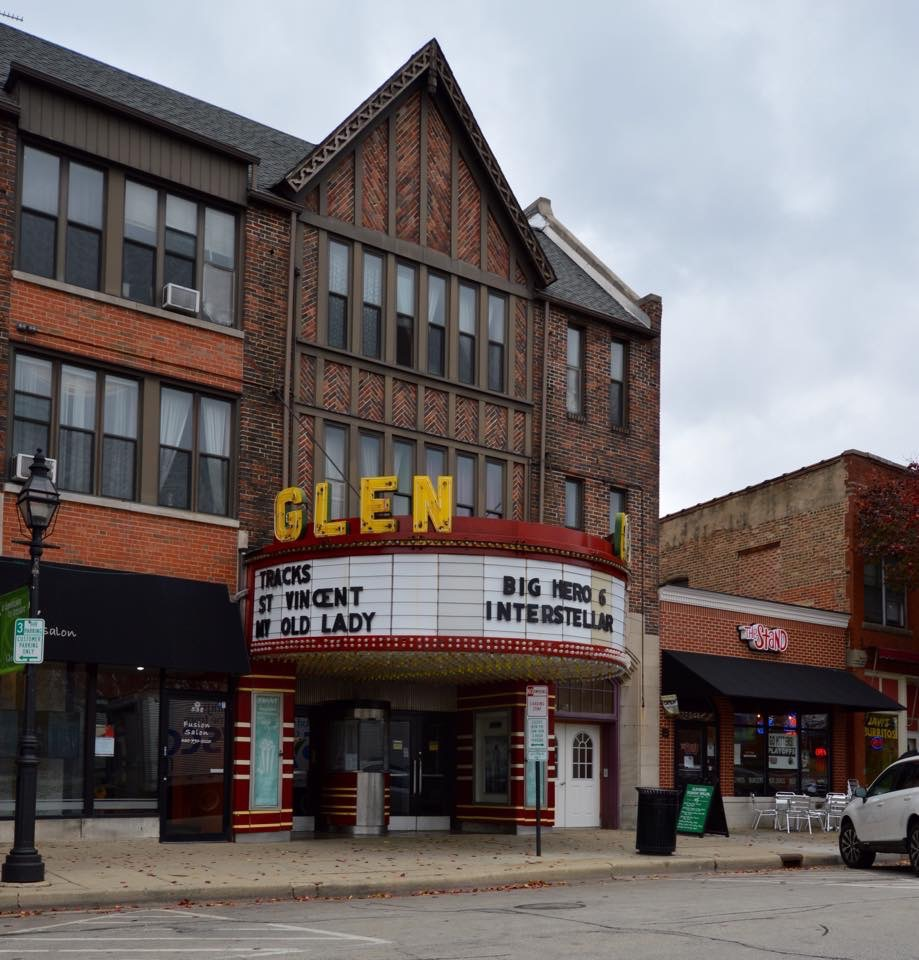
- Glen Theatre

- Location within Illinois Location within the United States
- Location: Main St., Crescent Blvd., & Pennsylvania Ave. Glen Ellyn, DuPage County, Illinois, U.S.
- Coordinates: 41°52′37″N 88°4′0″W
- NRHP reference No.: 13000716
- Added to NRHP: September 18, 2013

The Glen Ellyn Downtown North Historic District is a historic business district in Glen Ellyn, Illinois, United States. It is found on Main Street between Crescent Boulevard & Pennsylvania Avenue, the north side of Crescent between Main & Forest Avenue and the south side of Pennsylvania between Main and Glenwood Avenue. There are thirty-four buildings in the district, twenty-eight of which contribute to its historical fabric.

== History ==
Glen Ellyn, Illinois, was first settled in the 1830s. The first commercial establishment was Stacy's Tavern, built to serve stagecoach travelers. In 1849, the Galena and Chicago Union Railroad opened a station one mile south of the tavern on land owned by Dr. Lewey Quitterfield Newton. The railroad did not originally intend to build a station at the then-uninhabited area, but Newton was able to convince the company to run trains to the area if he raised the funds for the station. David Kelley, who named the station (and thus the ensuing settlement) Danby after his birth town in Vermont, built the Mansion House Hotel at the corner of Main Street and Crescent Boulevard in 1851, the first commercial development in the district. The Town of Danby was platted in 1855 by Newton.

Commercial activity was initially limited to the north side of the tracks. The village changed its name to Prospect Park in 1874 and to Glen Ellyn in 1891. The latter name change was prompted by the development of the Glen Ellyn Hotel & Springs Company, a resort overlooking the nearby lake. Although the resort was not a financial success by the time it was destroyed in a 1906 fire, it helped develop Glen Ellyn's reputation as an idyllic suburb and encouraged growth to its town center. In November 1891, a fire destroyed most of the buildings on the west side of Main Street between Crescent Boulevard and Pennsylvania Avenue. In the first two decades of the 20th century, the city invested in public improvements such as paved roads to attract business. As suburban living gained in popularity in the 1920s, Glen Ellyn became one of the most popular destinations for former Chicago residents.

== Architecture ==
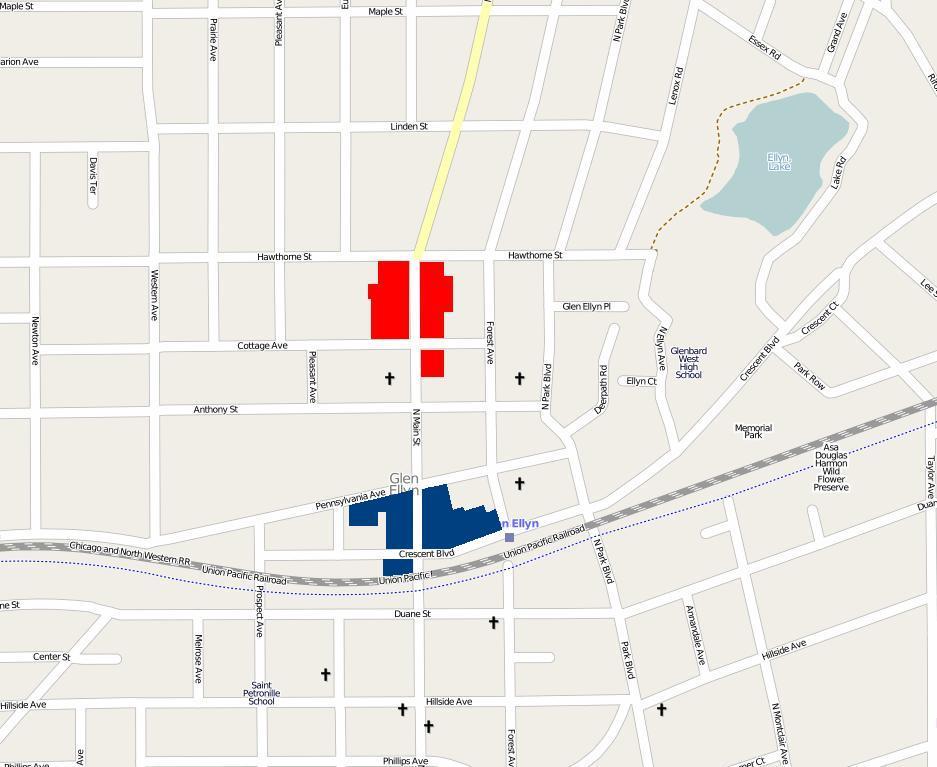
Location of Glen Ellyn Downtown North Historic District (dark blue) within Glen Ellyn

The following twenty-eight buildings contribute the historic district. There are two dominant architectural styles: eight buildings are in the Chicago school style and six are in the Tudor Revival style.

- 504 Crescent Boulevard, 1925, one-part commercial block in the Chicago school style
- 515 Crescent Boulevard, 1961, one-part commercial block in the Colonial Revival style. Designed by Perkins & Norris
- Glen Ellyn State Bank, 1926-1929, arcaded block in the Classical Revival style
- 528 Crescent Boulevard, c. 1925, two-part commercial block in the Tudor Revival style. Altered in 1986.
- 530 Crescent Boulevard, 1924, automobile showroom in the Chicago school style
- 532-534 Crescent Boulevard, c. 1915, two-part commercial block in the Chicago school and Streamline Moderne style. Altered in the 1930s.
- 536 Crescent Boulevard, 1926, two-part commercial block in the Tudor Revival style. Altered to an automobile showroom and garage in 1926 by Louis R. Christie.
- Glen Theatre, 1926, two-part commercial block in the Tudor Revival style. Designed by Betts & Holcomb.
- 544-546 Crescent Boulevard, c. 1910, two-part commercial block in the Chicago school style
- 548 Crescent Boulevard, c. 1900, two-part commercial block in the Chicago school style
- 550 Crescent Boulevard, 1925, one-part commercial block in the Tudor Revival style. Designed by Walker & Angell.
- 474-482 Forest Avenue, 1925-1926, garage in the Tudor Revival style. Designed by Walker & Angell.
- 474-476 North Main Street, c. 1910, one-part commercial block. Altered c. 1930.
- 475 North Main Street, 1892, two-part commercial block. Storefront altered in 1935.
- McChesney Foods store, c. 1900, one-part commercial block. Altered in 1935.
- 479 North Main Street, c. 1920, two-part commercial block in the Chicago school style
- 480 North Main Street, c. 1900, two-part commercial block. Altered in the 1950s.
- 480a North Main Street, c. 1900, one-part commercial block. Altered c. 1930
- 481-483 North Main Street, 1914, two-part commercial block in the Tudor Revival style. Altered first in 1932 by Walker & Angell and again in the 1950s.
- Frederick G. Walker Block, 1892, two-part commercial block in the Renaissance Revival style. Designed by Frederick G. Walker. Altered in the 1950s.
- 485 North Main Street, 1955, one-part commercial block. Designed by Emil Larson.
- 486 North Main Street, c. 1900, one-part commercial block. Altered in 1959.
- George M. H. Wagner Building, 1896, two-part commercial block in the Queen Anne style.
- 491-499 North Main Street, c. 1925, two-part commercial block in the Chicago school style. Altered c. 1935.
- 492-496 North Main Street, c. 1910, one-part commercial block. Altered c. 1945.
- 497 Pennsylvania Avenue, c. 1920, one-part commercial block
- 499 Pennsylvania Avenue, 1915, garage
- 505-507 Pennsylvania Avenue, c. 1920, one-part commercial block in the Chicago school style
