= William and Jennette Sloane House =

Historic house in Illinois, United States

- U.S. National Register of Historic Places
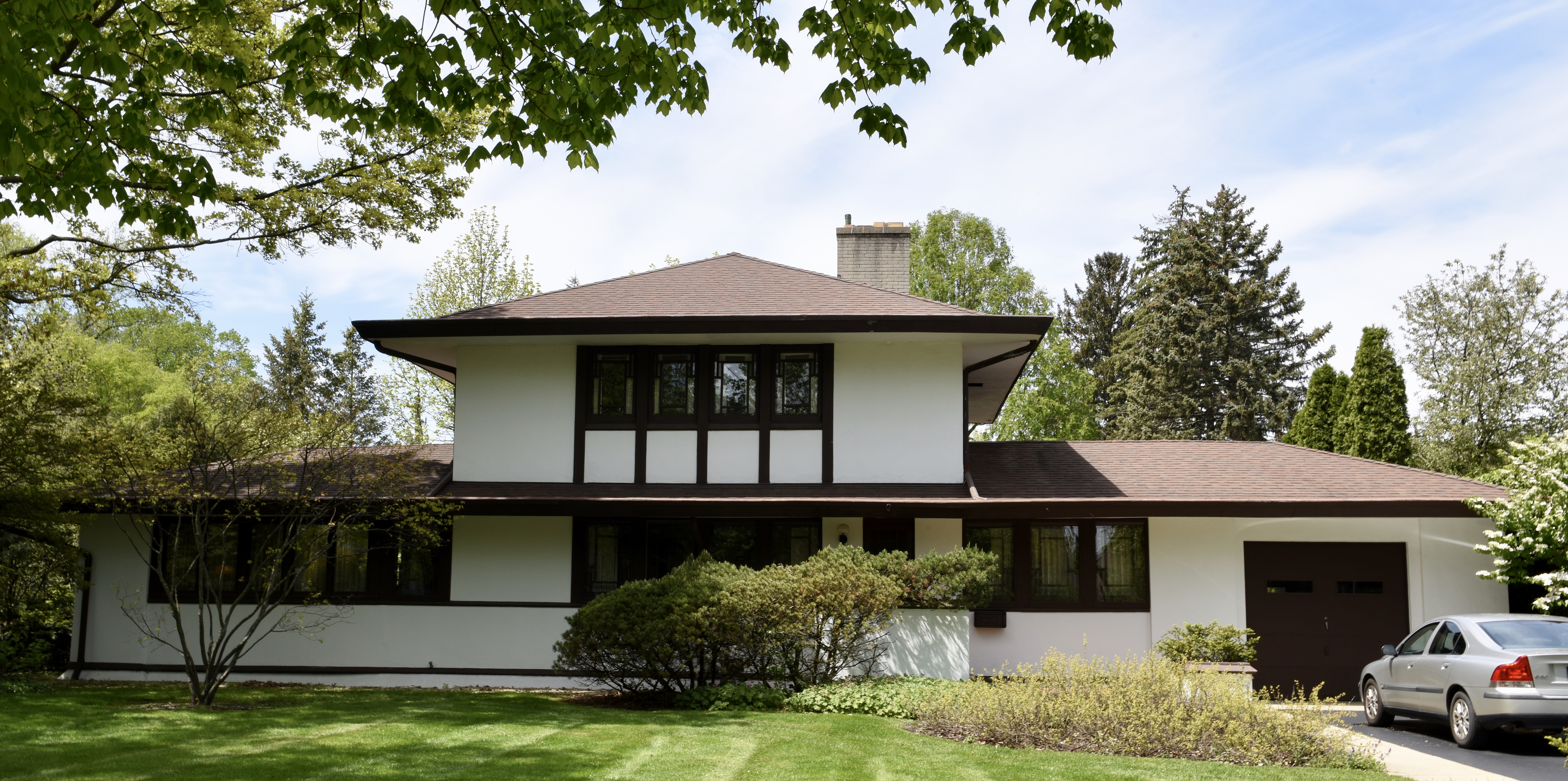

- Location within Illinois Location within the United States
- Location: 248 S. Arlington Ave., Elmhurst, Illinois
- Coordinates: 41°53′38″N 87°56′12″W
- Built: 1909
- Built by: Charles F. Assmann
- Architect: Walter Burley Griffin
- Architectural style: Prairie School
- NRHP reference No.: 16000896
- Added to NRHP: December 30, 2016

The William and Jennette Sloane House is a historic house located at 248 S. Arlington Avenue in Elmhurst, Illinois. Built in 1909, the Prairie School house was designed by prominent architect Walter Burley Griffin. The house is representative of Griffin's early work and is a well-preserved example of a smaller Prairie School work. The main section of the house is two stories tall, with one-story wings projecting on either side. The house's exterior is white stucco broken up by dark wooden boards. A row of casement windows runs along the house on both floors; the windows are decorated with muntins, one of the house's only ornamental features.

The house was added to the National Register of Historic Places on December 30, 2016.
