= Michael Hodges (writer) =

American speculative fiction writer (born 1976)

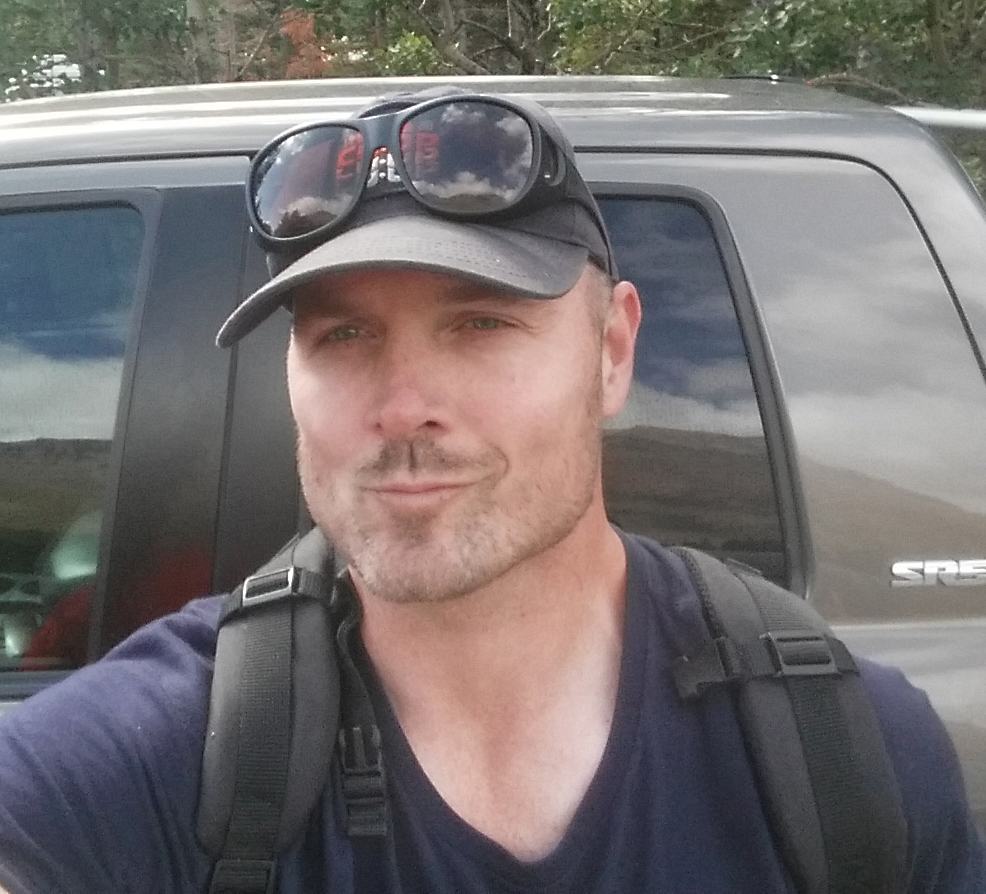
- Born: February 21, 1976 (age 50); Winfield, Illinois
- Occupations: Novelist, short story writer
- Writing career
- Period: 2010–present
- Genres: Science fiction, Horror

Michael Hodges is an American speculative fiction writer, photographer, conservation essayist, and internet personality. His latest publication is a guest essay in the Chicago Tribune, concerning greed, sprawl, and the Grizzly Bear 399. His debut novel The Puller, was released on April 24, 2015. The film rights for The Puller were purchased by Sonny Mallhi, producer of The Strangers and The Lake House. Foreign publishing rights were purchased by Luzifer Verlag, and The Puller was translated and released in Germany. His follow-up novel was The Invasive, a science fiction novel about alien ecosystem replacement in Montana. Audio rights were purchased by Tantor Media, with an AudioBook release date of February 28, 2017. Michael's short stories have been published in various magazines and anthologies. In March, 2021, reprint rights for The Puller were sold to Pyr, with distribution by Simon and Schuster. The Puller was developed as an audiobook by Tantor Media, with a release date of February 28, 2022.

He also taught a writing panel with Game of Thrones editor Anne Groell ("How to Improve Your Novel's Ending", Missoula Con, 2015).

Along with writing fiction, Hodges is a professional photographer, with work appearing in Outside Magazine, newspapers, and with conservation groups. Animals and nature often play a big role in his fiction, and the two art forms feed each other.

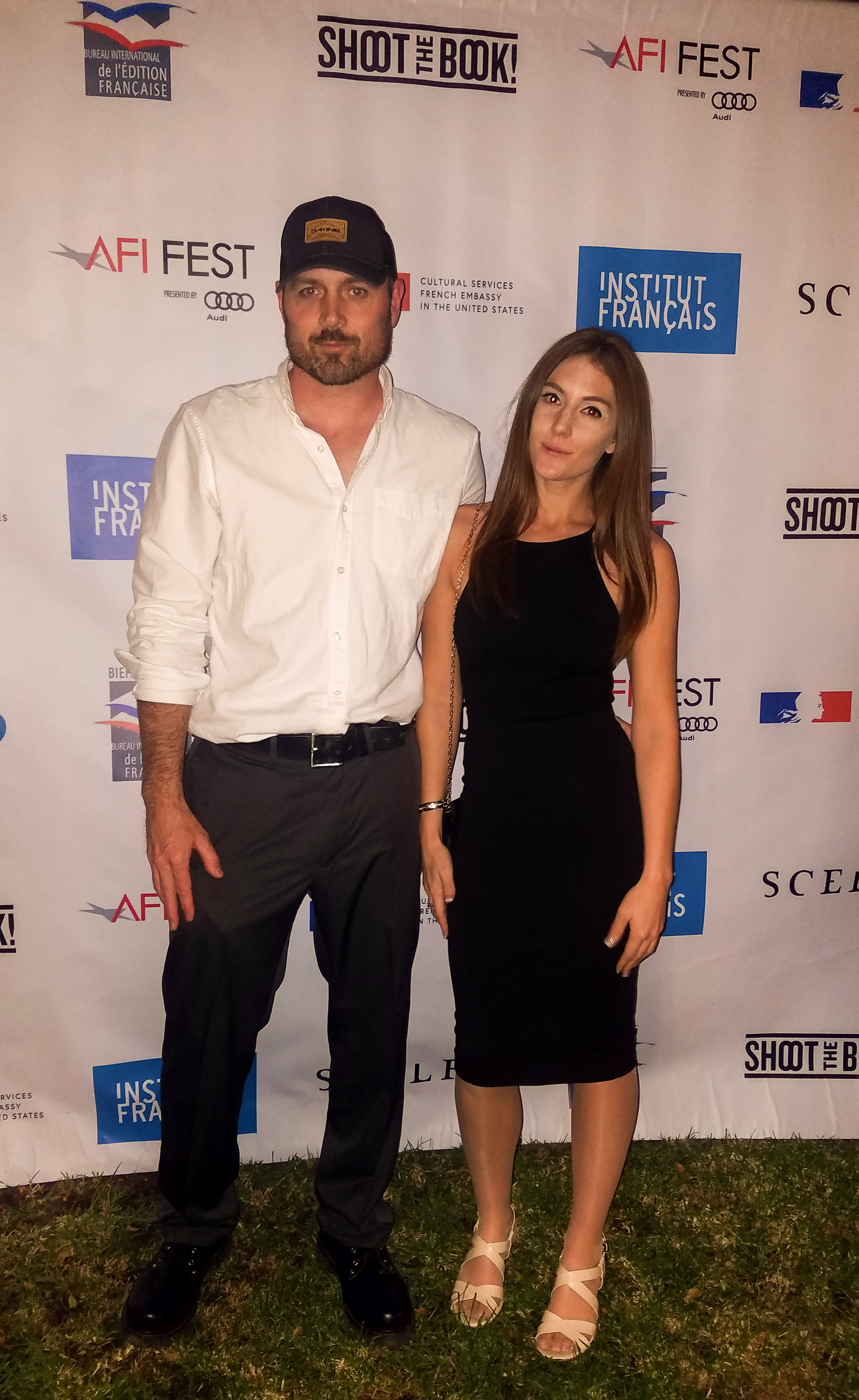
Appearing at Variety's "Shoot the Book" event, Résidence de France, Beverly Hills.

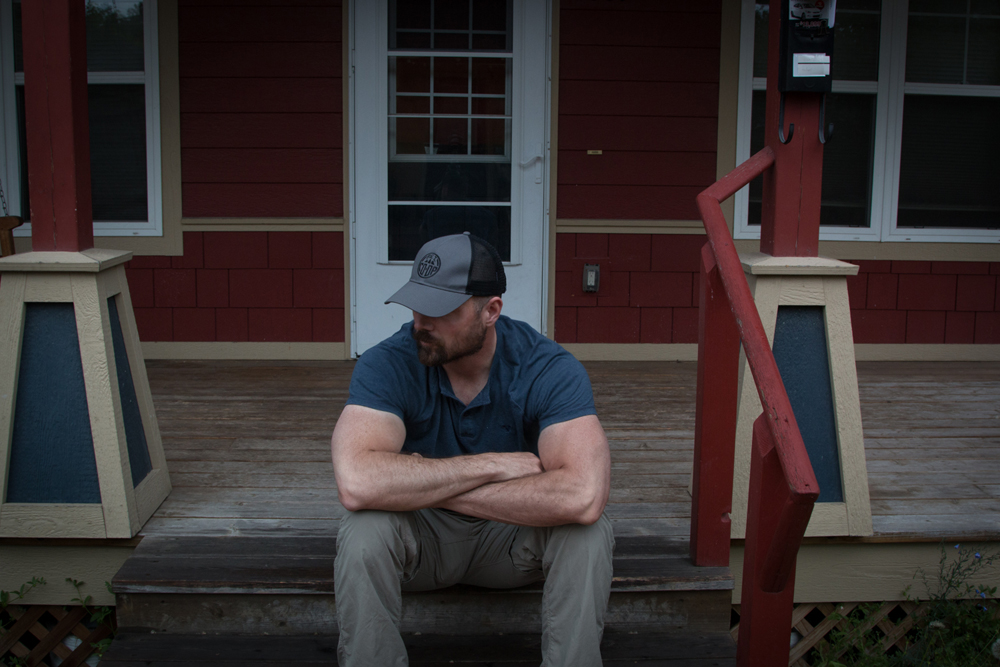
Michael Hodges in Missoula, Montana.

== Bibliography ==
=== Novels ===
- The Puller, Pyr/Simon and Schuster, November 16, 2021
- The Puller, Severed Press, 2015, optioned for film. (ISBN 1925225976)
- The Invasive, Severed Press, July 8, 2016, Amazon Best Seller. (ISBN 1925493490)
- Black Friday, Severed Press, February 10, 2017. (ISBN 192559727X)
- The Last Colossus, Severed Press, June 3, 2017. ISBN 1925597695)
- The Gloaming - 16 Organic Tales, Dark Gravity, February 6, 2017. (ASIN B01MYGR71Z)

=== Audiobooks ===
- The Puller, Tantor Audio, February 28, 2022. iTunes, Audible.
- The Invasive, Tantor Audio 2017. iTunes, etc. (ISBN 1515969843)
- The Last Colossus, Beacon, 2017. iTunes, etc. (ASIN B077F49JNZ)

=== Short stories ===
- "Glass Eye Pines" - "Perihelion Science Fiction" November 2015
- "Geiter" – Perihelion Science Fiction – January 2014
- "Divinity" – Perihelion Science Fiction – May 2014
- "Lost Planes, Lost River" – Perihelion Science Fiction – January 2014
- "9 Steps from Door 9" – Spark: A Creative Anthology, Vol. IV – January 2014
- "Hydra" – AE: The Canadian Science Fiction Review – November 2013
- "Swampy Transitions" – Plasma Frequency – December 2013
- "Carillion’s Schemes" – Perihelion Science Fiction – October 2013
- "Fletcher’s Mountains" – Perihelion Science Fiction – June, 2013
- "Lost Branch of the Silver" – Bards and Sages Quarterly – October 2013
- "Uncommon Ally" – Penumbra – May 2013
- "Krieger" – Interstellar Fiction – April 2013
- "Seven Fish for Sarah" – Penumbra – December 2012.
- "Storm Fronts" – The Old, Weird South (anthology) – December 2012.
- "From the Mountain, Fury" – Bards and Sages Quarterly – January 2013.
- "Grangy" – AE: The Canadian Science Fiction Review – October 2012
- "Frequencies" – Plasma Frequency – August 2012.
- "Street Lamps and Carbaryl" – Bards and Sages Quarterly – April 2012.
- "Big, Blue Steel" – Sparks: Standout Fantasy (anthology) – February 2012.
- "Window of Jacob" – Big Book of New Short Horror – September 2011.
- "The Believers" – America the Horrific (anthology) – 2011.
- "The Watcher in the Corner" – Something Wicked – October 2011.
- "The Red Aspen" – Ghostlight – September 2011.
- "Shiners" – Dead Bait 2 (anthology), with Ramsey Campbell, James Robert Smith, and Steve Alten – 2011
