= Big Woods School =

- U.S. National Register of Historic Places
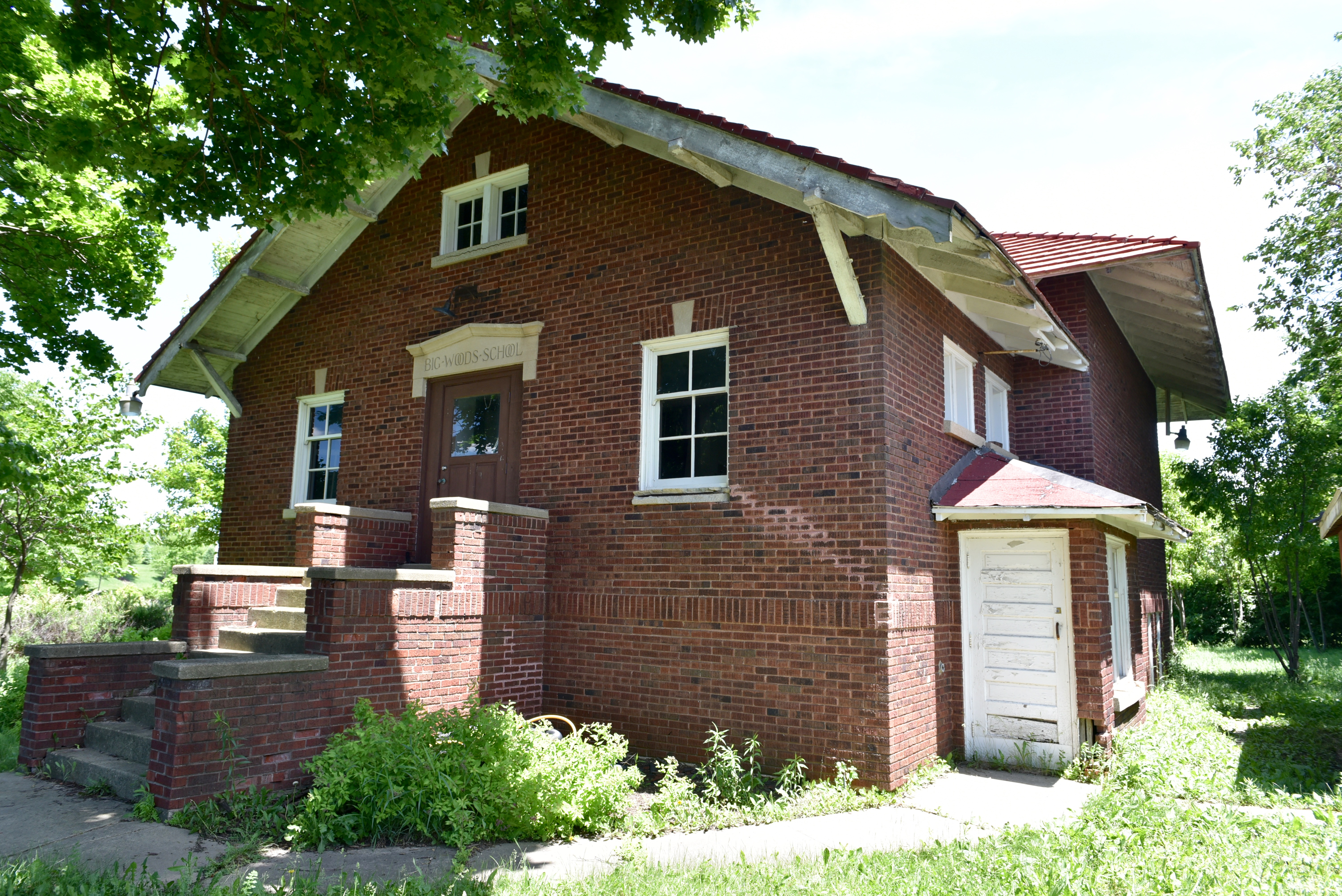

- Location within Illinois Location within the United States
- Location: 3033 N. Eola Rd., Aurora, Illinois
- Coordinates: 41°49′07″N 88°13′51″W
- Built: 1917-18
- Built by: Schiffler Brothers
- Architectural style: American Craftsman
- NRHP reference No.: 16000197
- Added to NRHP: April 21, 2016

The Big Woods School is a historic one-room schoolhouse located at 3033 N. Eola Road in Aurora, Illinois. The school was built in 1917–18 to replace the original Big Woods School, which was built in the mid-19th century and had fallen into disrepair. The red brick school building has a Craftsman design. It was one of the first schoolhouses in DuPage County built after Illinois' Sanitation Law of 1915, which created a set of modern safety and sanitation standards for the state's public schools. The school's plan is essentially the same as that recommended by the state, with considerations for playground space, lighting, ventilation, and indoor plumbing. In 1963, the school closed due to consolidation with two nearby schools, and the building was sold to a private owner; it is now owned by a not-for-profit preservation group.

The schoolhouse was added to the National Register of Historic Places on April 21, 2016.
