= Winfield, Illinois =

- Village
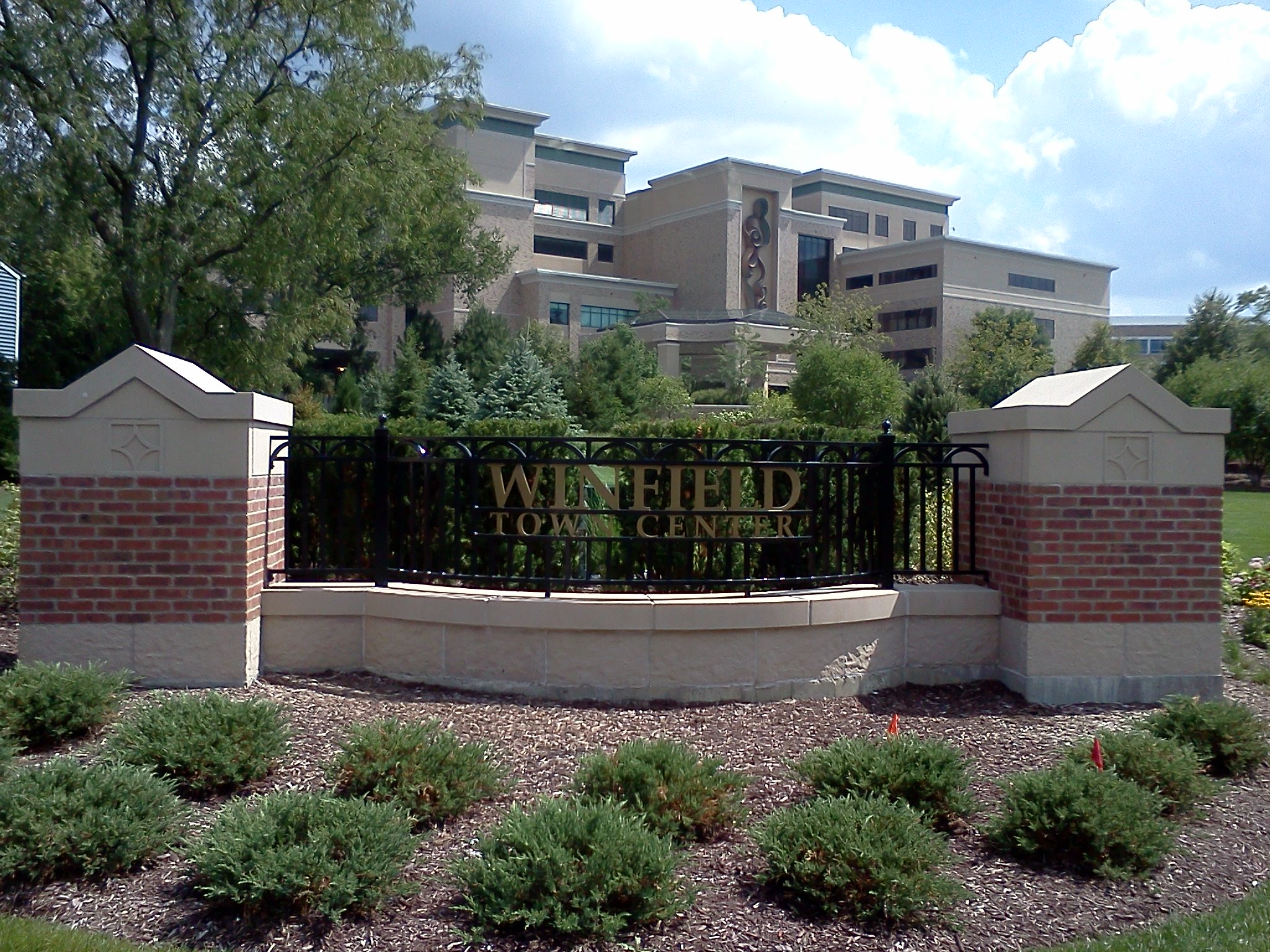
- Winfield Town Center
- Etymology: Gen. Winfield Scott
- Mottoes: "Growing Smart; In Harmony With Nature"
- Location of Winfield in DuPage County, Illinois
- Coordinates: 41°52′24″N 88°09′17″W
- Country: United States
- State: Illinois
- County: DuPage
- Townships: Milton, Winfield
- Incorporated: April 18, 1921

Government
  - Type: Mayor-trustee

Area
  - Total: 3.14 sq mi (8.13 km^{2})
  - Land: 3.10 sq mi (8.02 km^{2})
  - Water: 0.039 sq mi (0.10 km^{2})
- Elevation: 764 ft (233 m)

Population (2020)
  - Total: 9,835
  - Estimate (2022): 10,046
  - Density: 3,250/sq mi (1,253/km^{2})
- Time zone: UTC−6 (Central (CST))
  - Summer (DST): UTC−5 (CDT)
- ZIP Code: 60190
- Area codes: 630 and 331
- FIPS code: 17-82400
- GNIS feature ID: 2399715
- Website: villageofwinfield.com

Winfield is an incorporated village located in Milton and Winfield Townships, DuPage County, Illinois, United States. The DuPage River headwaters are located directly to the north, and the river runs through the village. The population was 9,835 at the 2020 census, and was estimated to be 10,046 in 2022.

Winfield is the location of Central DuPage Hospital, one of the largest hospitals in the Chicago suburbs. Winfield station on the Union Pacific West Line provides commuter rail service to Chicago. Winfield is considered among the safest towns in Illinois.

== History ==
Winfield originally tried to become an incorporated village in 1884 under the town name 'Frederick Park'. However, the motion was denied as the town did not have 300 residents as was required for incorporation. When the village was finally incorporated in 1921, the town had a population of 310 people.

The earliest settlers, Erastus and Jude P. Gary, came to Winfield in 1832. Winfield was originally known as Gary's Mill after these early settlers, and later, Fredericksburg, owing to a significant German-speaking population. Before 1850, most Winfield residents were migrants from New England; however, by 1860, half of the residents were from Germany and Alsace-Lorraine. Winfield retained a community of German-speaking farmers until the 1920s. In the late 1800s, the settlement's name was changed again to Winfield after the war hero Winfield Scott.

Winfield was home to one of the oldest taverns in the Chicago suburbs, John's Restaurant and Tavern (formerly John's Buffet), founded in 1921 by immigrant John T Karwoski. It closed its doors in December 2017. John Karwoski was instrumental in the political and economic development of Winfield, and it was his guidance and leadership that took a fledgling prairie town clinging to existence after the railroad boom went bust, and turned it into a viable and livable village. Mr Karwoski became the first Chief of the all-volunteer Winfield Volunteer Fire Company in 1935. 45 years later, his son John Karwoski II was made Chief of the expanded Winfield Fire Protection District in 1980.

Winfield was served by The Winfield Glimpses newspaper from October 1947 to October 1976. The Glimpses changed its name to the Winfield Examiner in November 1976 and ran until February 1992.

== Geography ==
According to the United States Census Bureau, the village has a total area of 3.14 square miles (8.1 km^{2}), of which 3.10 square miles (8.0 km^{2}) is land and 0.04 square miles (0.10 km^{2}), is water.

In addition to the West Branch of the DuPage River, Klein Creek and Winfield Creek also flow through the village.

== Demographics ==
Historical population
| Census | Pop. | Note | %± |
|---|---|---|---|
| 1880 | 164 | | — |
| 1930 | 445 | | — |
| 1940 | 567 | | 27.4% |
| 1950 | 714 | | 25.9% |
| 1960 | 1,575 | | 120.6% |
| 1970 | 4,285 | | 172.1% |
| 1980 | 4,422 | | 3.2% |
| 1990 | 7,096 | | 60.5% |
| 2000 | 8,718 | | 22.9% |
| 2010 | 9,080 | | 4.2% |
| 2020 | 9,835 | | 8.3% |
| 2022 (est.) | 10,046 | ▲ | 2.1% |
U.S. Decennial Census; 2020 Census

=== Racial and ethnic composition ===
Winfield village, Illinois – Racial composition Note: the US Census treats Hispanic/Latino as an ethnic category. This table excludes Latinos from the racial categories and assigns them to a separate category. Hispanics/Latinos may be of any race.
| Race (NH = Non-Hispanic) | % 2020 | % 2010 | % 2000 | Pop 2020 | Pop 2010 | Pop 2000 |
|---|---|---|---|---|---|---|
| White alone (NH) | 81.4% | 87.9% | 92.1% | 8,001 | 7,983 | 8,029 |
| Black alone (NH) | 1.5% | 1.5% | 1.2% | 148 | 139 | 108 |
| American Indian alone (NH) | 0% | 0.1% | 0.1% | 2 | 8 | 7 |
| Asian alone (NH) | 5.2% | 3.3% | 2.9% | 510 | 302 | 255 |
| Pacific Islander alone (NH) | 0% | 0% | 0% | 0 | 3 | 2 |
| Other race alone (NH) | 0.1% | 0.1% | 0% | 13 | 12 | 4 |
| Multiracial (NH) | 3.9% | 1.6% | 0.9% | 387 | 141 | 80 |
| Hispanic/Latino (any race) | 7.9% | 5.4% | 2.7% | 774 | 492 | 233 |

=== 2020 census ===
As of the 2020 census, Winfield had a population of 9,835, with 3,863 households and 2,937 families residing in the village. The median age was 46.4 years. 20.3% of residents were under the age of 18 and 20.3% were 65 years of age or older. For every 100 females, there were 94.2 males, and for every 100 females age 18 and over, there were 91.3 males. The population density was 3,147.20 inhabitants per square mile (1,215.14/km^{2}), and there were 3,981 housing units at an average density of 1,273.92 per square mile (491.86/km^{2}).

100.0% of residents lived in urban areas, while 0.0% lived in rural areas.

Of the 3,863 households, 27.3% had children under the age of 18 living in them. 63.2% were married-couple households, 12.3% had a male householder with no spouse or partner present, and 21.3% had a female householder with no spouse or partner present. About 22.9% of all households were made up of individuals, and 12.3% had someone living alone who was 65 years of age or older. The average household size was 2.94 and the average family size was 2.53.

Of the 3,981 housing units, 3.0% were vacant. The homeowner vacancy rate was 1.3% and the rental vacancy rate was 6.7%.

The most reported ancestries in 2020 were:

- German (31.3%)
- Irish (23.3%)
- English (15.3%)
- Italian (14.3%)
- Polish (12.1%)
- Mexican (5.4%)
- Swedish (4.9%)
- Scottish (4.4%)
- French (4.2%)
- Norwegian (3.1%)

=== Income and poverty ===
The median income for a household in the village was $125,481, and the median income for a family was $146,122. Males had a median income of $78,434 versus $60,421 for females. The per capita income for the village was $55,616. About 0.7% of families and 1.4% of the population were below the poverty line, including 1.8% of those under age 18 and 0.5% of those age 65 or over.

== Arts and culture ==
=== Historical places ===
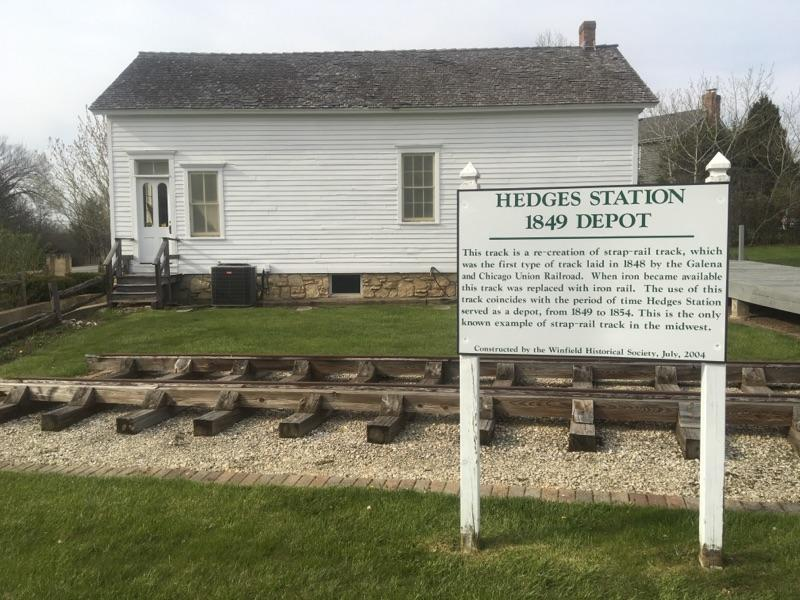
Hedges Station "Besch House" is the oldest remaining train depot in Illinois

Hedges station is the oldest train depot in Illinois. Built in 1849, it is now a museum.

The Chicago-Winfield Tuberculosis Sanitarium was founded in 1909. As tuberculosis declined, the Sanitarium saw a decrease in patients and in 1962, the sanitarium was purchased by the Central DuPage Hospital Association.

St. John the Baptist Catholic Church was erected in 1867. It burned down in 1906, and was rebuilt.

== Parks and recreation ==
=== Public parks ===
There are a total of 19 parks and facilities within the Village of Winfield, offering a variety of recreation uses.

Winfield Riverwalk Park opened in October 2021. Amenities include trails, fitness stations, wetlands, garden, a canoe/kayak launch, picnic shelter, and fishing.

Winfield Mounds Forest Preserve contain Native American burial mounds, and borders Red Hawk Park Timber Ridge Forest Preserve, West DuPage Woods Forest Preserve, and Belleau Woods Forest Preserve.

West Branch DuPage River Trail passes through Winfield.

Klein Creek Golf Club offers an 18-hole golf course.

== Education ==
The Village of Winfield is served by three school districts: West Chicago Elementary School District 33 (K–8, serving the north side of Winfield); Winfield Elementary School District 34 (K–8, serving the south side of Winfield); and Community Unit School District 200 (K–12, Wheaton-Warrenville, serving the east side of Winfield). Since Winfield has no public high school, students from Districts 33 and 34 attend West Chicago Community High School, and students from CUSD 200 attend Wheaton North High School. It has three public elementary/middle schools, Winfield Primary School (PK–2), Winfield Central School (3–8), and Pleasant Hill Elementary School (K–5), and two private elementary/middle schools, St. John the Baptist Catholic School (PK–8) and Wheaton Christian Grammar School (K–8).

== Transportation ==
The Winfield station provides Metra commuter rail service along the Union Pacific West Line. Trains travel east Ogilvie Transportation Center in Chicago and west to Elburn station.

Pace provides bus service in the Wheaton Winfield On Demand service zone.

== Notable people ==
- Christopher Bear (b. 1982), drummer and backing vocalist for Brooklyn-based indie rock group Grizzly Bear (Band)
- Wes Benjamin (b. 1993), pitcher with the Texas Rangers.
- Alex Benoit (b. 1995), competitive ice dancer, fourth place at 2017 U.S. Figure Skating Championships
- Michael Bowden (b. 1986), former pitcher with Chicago Cubs
- Chris Brown (b. 1981), running back with Houston Texans
- Carolena Carstens (b. 1996), taekwondo olympian
- Dorothy Chang (b. 1970), composer born in Winfield
- Rob DeVita (b. 1965), football player for Seattle Seahawks
- Scott Michael Foster (b. 1985), actor
- John Warne Gates (1855–1911), pioneer promoter of barbed wire and founder of The Texas Company, a precursor to Texaco
- Sam Himmelfarb (1904–1976), American artist and commercial exhibit designer; built the Samuel and Eleanor Himmelfarb House and Studio in Winfield
- Eleanor Himmelfarb (1910–2009), American artist, teacher and conservationist
- Michael Hodges (b. 1976), American fiction writer
- Frank Kaminsky (b. 1993), basketball player for the Atlanta Hawks
- Debbie Keller (b. 1975), former member of United States women's national soccer team
- Anthony Louis (b.1995), left wing/center for Chicago Blackhawks
- Philip Lutzenkirchen (b. 1991), American football tight end, who played at Auburn University
- Andrew Marshall (b. 1984), defender with Crystal Palace Baltimore and Harrisburg City Islanders
- Walt Moryn (1926–1996), outfielder with Chicago Cubs and St. Louis Cardinals
- Jarett Park (b. 1981) professional lacrosse player
- Luke Putkonen (b. 1986), former pitcher for Detroit Tigers
- Rob Scahill (b. 1987), pitcher with the Chicago White Sox
- Shealeigh (b. 1998), singer
- Kevin Streelman (b. 1978), golfer on PGA Tour
- Bradie Tennell (b.1998), figure skater, 2018 U.S. national champion
- Nikos Tselios (b. 1979), defenseman with NHL's Carolina Hurricanes and others
- William M. Whitney (1828–c. 1908), American politician
- Jonathan C. Wright (b. 1966), State's attorney for Logan County, Illinois
