= John L. Pentecost House =

Historic house in Illinois, United States

- U.S. National Register of Historic Places
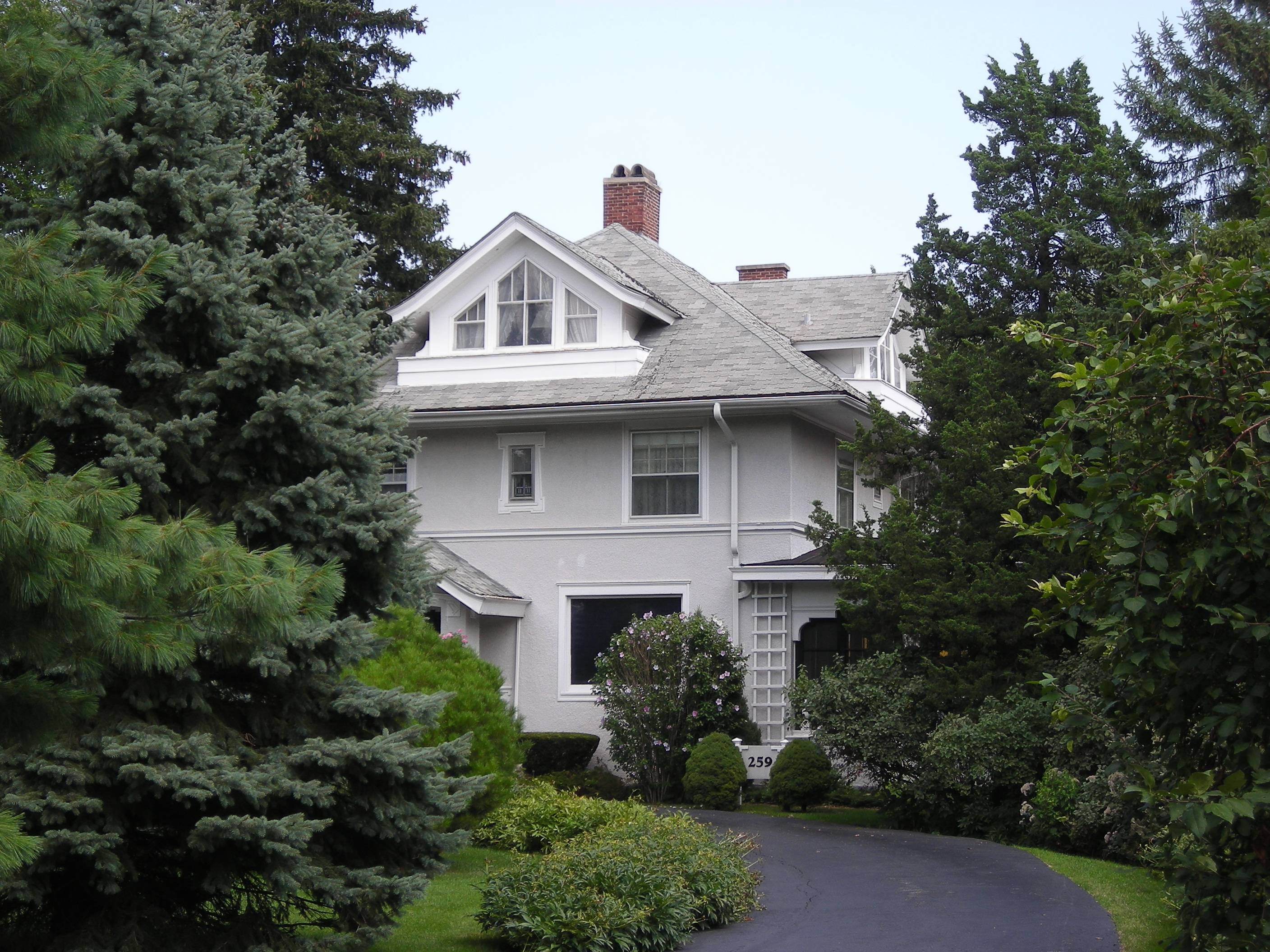

- Location within Illinois Location within the United States
- Location: 259 Cottage Hill Ave. Elmhurst, DuPage County, Illinois, U.S.
- Coordinates: 41°53′38″N 87°56′31″W
- Built: 1888
- Architect: Henry G. Fiddelke
- Architectural style: Late 19th and Early 20th Century American
- NRHP reference No.: 03000916
- Added to NRHP: September 13, 2003

The John L. Pentecost House is a historic residence located in Elmhurst, Illinois, reflecting c. 1910 design trends.

== History ==
The house was originally constructed in 1888 in the Queen Anne style for Rebecca Richardson for $3,000. The house was built in a burgeoning Elmhurst, Illinois neighborhood, Cottage Hill Avenue, where several stately mansions had recently been constructed. Its construction was typical of Victorian residences with a hipped roof with lower cross gables.

The house was purchased in 1910 by John L. Pentecost, a seafood purveyor for Chicago hotels. Pentecost immediately hired Oak Park architect Henry G. Fiddelke to completely remodel the house. Pentecost's wife was interested in architecture and wanted their new residence to incorporate recent design trends. The result was a blend of several popular architectural styles, such as Prairie School and Arts and Crafts, while still retaining some of the Victorian features of the original residence. Fiddelke previously worked with Adler & Sullivan and was currently in the employ of Joseph Lyman Silsbee. Among his designs was Ernest Hemingway's childhood home. Hemingway was a friend of John Pentecost's son Jack, so John may have heard of Fiddelke through this connection. Dr. Edwin M. Smith, Jr. purchased the house from the Pentecost estate in 1946 and lived there until 1970. The house retains the integrity of the 1910 remodel.

Notice of Public Hearing Historic Preservation Commission Case Number 16-HPC-01 Request for Removal of Historic Landmark Designation Notice is hereby given that the Elmhurst Historic Commission will hold a public hearing on Wednesday, March 9, 2016, at 7:00 p.m., in the Elmhurst City Hall, 209 N. York Street, Elmhurst, Illinois. The purpose of this meeting is to consider a request for removal of historic landmark designation pursuant to the Elmhurst Historic Preservation Ordinance.

Regarding March 9 public hearing, Commission allowed the removal of historic landmark designation.

Home is presently be razed/deconstructed in July 2017.

== Architecture ==
The house sits on a 100-by-298-foot (30 m × 91 m) lot (roughly 0.75 acres (0.30 ha)). It is a 2 1/2-story residence, approximately 31 by 47 feet (9.4 m × 14.3 m). When remodeled in 1910, the exterior was painted with a light-grey Portland cement stucco. This is accented with darker-grey wood-and-metal trim. The front of the house faces the west. A large picture window 7 by 5 feet (2.1 m × 1.5 m) and two casement art glass windows decorate the facade. The second floor of this side has two double-hung windows, one of which remains from the original 1888 construction. The entrance is under a gabled portico with a slight pitch and decorative wood details. The portico columns are stucco with white trim. Dark-grey steps lead to a landing with two built-in bench seats. Copper gutters on this side have been painted white. The north side has a gabled projection that extends 4 feet (1.2 m); the projection extends slightly farther on the second and third floors. The east (rear) elevation features a rear entrance with a small porch. A second-floor porch is supported with wood columns with Doric capitals. The south side features the veranda with fitted screens and storm windows on three sides. A 1910-door leads from the veranda to the interior dining room. A garage and gazebo were recently constructed on the property.
