= Stacy's Tavern =

- U.S. National Register of Historic Places
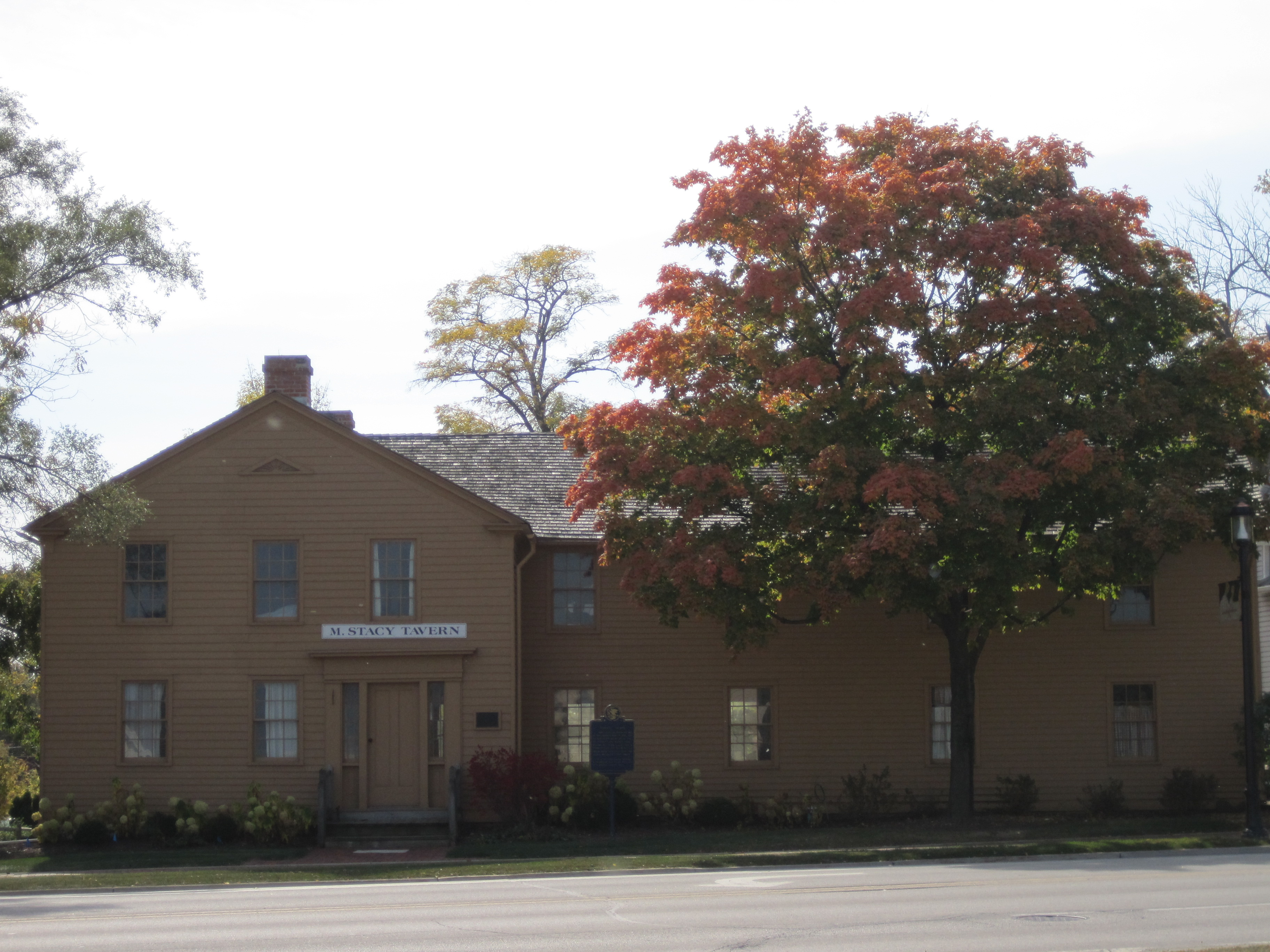

- Location within Illinois
- Location: Geneva Rd. and Main St., Glen Ellyn, Illinois
- Coordinates: 41°53′23″N 88°3′53″W
- Area: 0.7 acres (0.28 ha)
- Built: 1846
- Architect: Stacy, Moses
- Architectural style: Greek Revival
- NRHP reference No.: 74002195
- Added to NRHP: October 29, 1974

Stacy's Tavern is a historic wayside stagecoach inn in the village of Glen Ellyn in DuPage County, Illinois. It was added to the National Register of Historic Places on October 29, 1974.

== History ==
Among the settlers coming to northern Illinois following the Black Hawk War in 1832 were Moses Stacy and his family. Stacy often opened his home as a boarding house for passing travelers, so when he constructed his new home in 1846 he opened it as a wayside inn. Stagecoach travelers moving between Chicago and Galena, area farmers heading to market in Chicago, and settlers moving westward farther still all made use of Stacy's Tavern.

For 50 cents guests could overnight, including two meals and enough hay for two horses. At the inn they could wash with water from the indoor tavern well or warm themselves near the cast-iron stove. Stacy's was limited by law to allowing only five travelers per bed. The home was built in a modified Greek revival style and the boards were milled at a nearby sawmill, Gary's Mill and the bricks were handmade.

It was the railroad that hailed the death knell of Stacy Tavern as a wayside inn. Even after the arrival of the railroad, Stacy and his wife continued to use the house as their residence until Moses died in 1870 and his wife in 1899. They are buried in nearby Forest Hill Cemetery.

== Restoration ==
The Village of Glen Ellyn purchased the property in 1968, and along with the Glen Ellyn Historical Society restored it to the state of a typical tavern inn of the late 1840s. Restorers studied old photos, removed numerous paint layers, and analyzed architectural elements to detail the original construction of the tavern. Artifacts furnishing the tavern were collected by the Society from across the United States, and the chairs in the Tap Room were made by an Illinois carpenter in the 1840s.

In 1974 it was added to the National Register of Historic Places and was honored by Illinois as the only tavern from its period still standing on its original foundation at its original location. In 1976 Glen Ellyn opened Stacy's Tavern to the public as a museum as part of the town's contribution to the American bicentennial.
