= DuPage County, Illinois =

County in Illinois, United States

- County
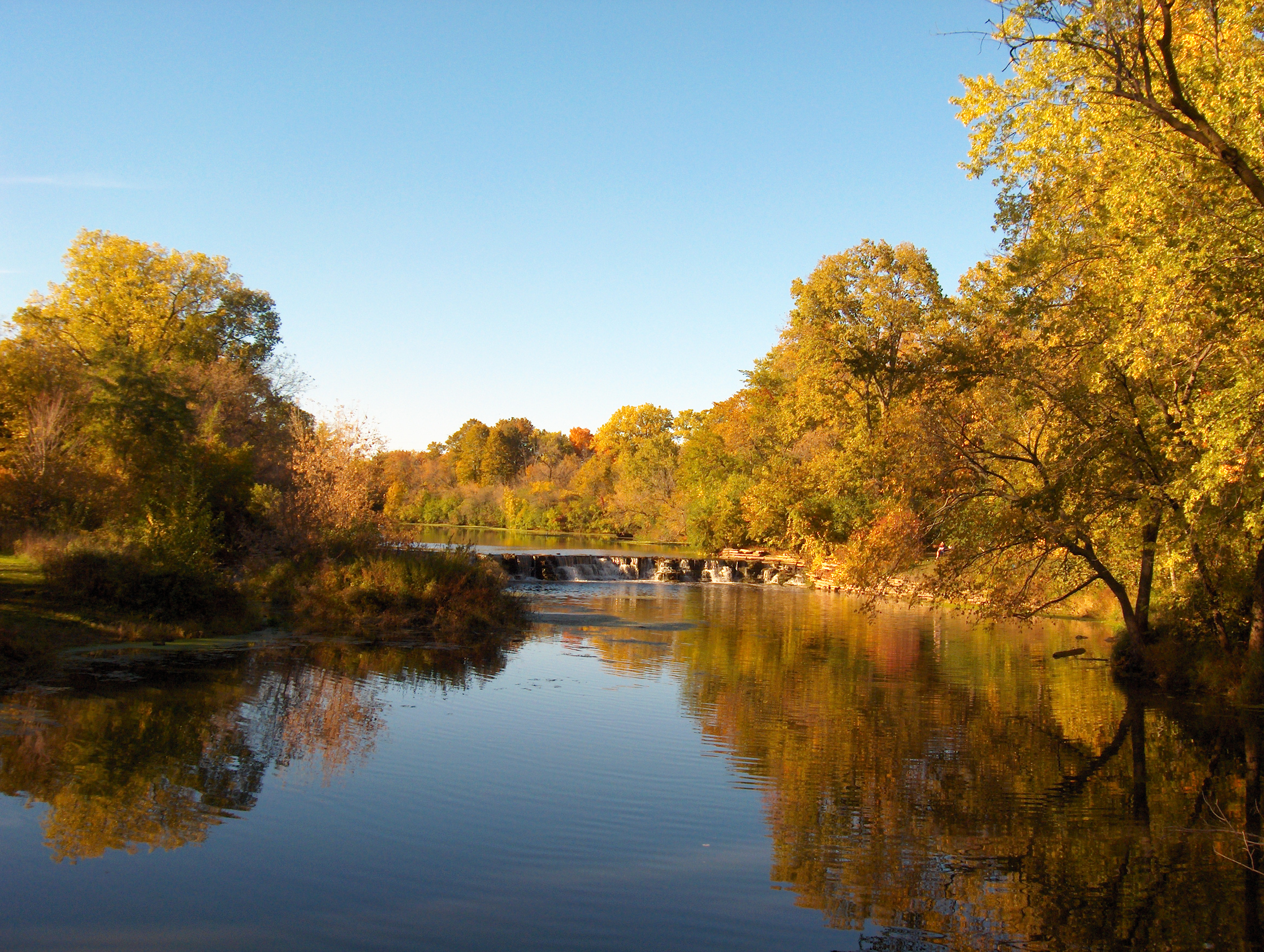
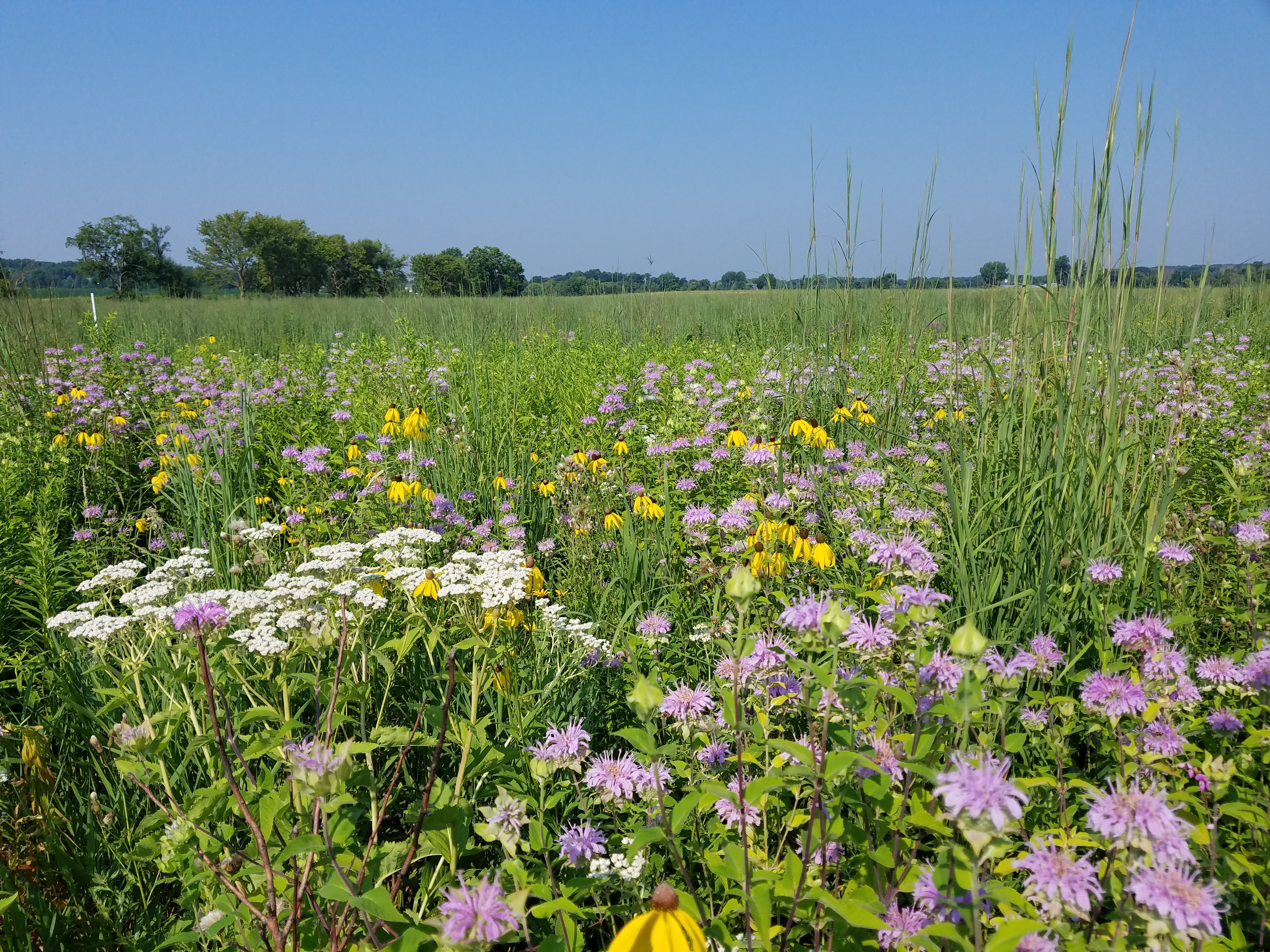
- Warrenville Grove Forest Preserve on the West Branch of the DuPage River; Restored tallgrass prairie in Dunham Forest Preserve

- Seal
- Motto: The Magnificent Miles West of Chicago
- Location within the U.S. state of Illinois
- Coordinates: 41°51′07″N 88°05′08″W
- Country: United States
- State: Illinois
- Founded: February 9, 1839
- Named for: DuPage River
- Seat: Wheaton
- Largest city: Naperville

Area
  - Total: 336 sq mi (870 km^{2})
  - Land: 327 sq mi (850 km^{2})
  - Water: 8.9 sq mi (23 km^{2}) 2.6%

Population (2020)
  - Total: 932,877
  - Estimate (2025): 934,298 ▲
  - Density: 2,850/sq mi (1,100/km^{2})

GDP
  - Total: $129.734 billion (2024)
  - Per capita: $138,857 (2024)
- Time zone: UTC−6 (Central)
  - Summer (DST): UTC−5 (CDT)
- Area code: 630 and 331
- Congressional districts: 3rd, 4th, 6th, 8th, 11th
- Website: www.dupagecounty.gov

DuPage County (/duːˈpeɪdʒ/ doo-PAYJ) is located in the U.S. state of Illinois, and is one of the collar counties of the Chicago metropolitan area. As of the 2020 census, the population was 932,877, making it Illinois' second-most populous county. Its county seat is Wheaton.

Known for its vast tallgrass prairies, DuPage County has become mostly developed and suburbanized, although some pockets of farmland remain in the county's western and northern parts. Located in the Rust Belt, the area is one of few in the region whose economy quickly became dependent on the headquarters of several large corporations due to its close proximity to Chicago. As quarries closed in the 1990s, land that was formerly used for mining and plants was converted into mixed-use, master-planned developments to meet the growing tax base. The county has a mixed socioeconomic profile and residents of Hinsdale include some of the wealthiest people in the Midwest. On the whole, the county enjoys above average median household income levels and low overall poverty levels when compared to the national average.

== History ==
Prior to European-American settlement, the area that is now DuPage County was inhabited by the Potawatomi people. By 1800, the Potawatomi had established 4 major villages along local rivers within the county, and had a network of trails crisscrossing the area. The first European-American settlers arrived in what is now DuPage County in 1832, and the Potawatomi population was forced out of the region only one year later after ceding their land in the Treaty of Chicago. DuPage County was officially formed on February 9, 1839, out of Cook County. The county took its name from the DuPage River, which was, in turn, named after a French fur trapper, DuPage. The first written history to address the name, the 1882 History of DuPage County, Illinois, by Rufus Blanchard, relates:

The DuPage River had, from time immemorial, been a stream well known. It took its name from a French trader who settled on this stream below the fork previous to 1800. Hon. H. W. Blodgett, of Waukegan, informs the writer that J. B. Beaubien had often spoken to him of the old Frenchman, Du Page, whose station was on the bank of the river, down toward its mouth, and stated that the river took its name from him. The county name must have the same origin. Col Gurden S. Hubbard, who came into the country in 1818, informs the writer that the name DuPage, as applied to the river then, was universally known, but the trader for whom it was named lived there before his time. Mr. Beaubien says it is pronounced Du Pazhe (having the sound of ah, and that the P should be capitalized). This was in reply to Mr. Blodgett's inquiry of him concerning the matter.

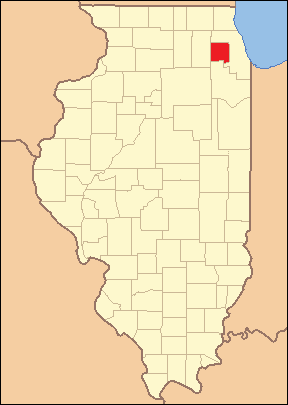
DuPage County at the time of its creation in 1839

The first white settler in DuPage County was Bailey Hobson who, with Lewis Stewart, built a house in 1831 for the Hobson family at a site about 2 miles (3.2 km) south of present-day downtown Naperville. Hobson later built a mill to serve surrounding farmers. Today, the Hobson house still stands on Hobson Road in Naperville, and the location of the mill is commemorated with a millstone and monument in today's Pioneer Park.

== Geography ==
According to the U.S. Census Bureau, the county has a total area of 336 square miles (870 km^{2}), of which 327 square miles (850 km^{2}) is land and 8.9 square miles (23 km^{2}) (2.6%) is water. The DuPage River and the Salt Creek flow through DuPage County. According to the Forest Preserve District of DuPage County, the highest point in the county is located at the Mallard Lake Landfill, which at its highest point is 982 feet (299 m) above mean sea level.

Up to 60% of the county’s water was supplied by shallow dolomite wells until more communities began receiving water from Lake Michigan via City of Chicago in the 1990s.

=== Climate ===
Wheaton, Illinois

Climate chart (precipitation, max. and min. temperature)
J	F	M	A	M	J	J	A	S	O	N	D
1.9 32 14	1.6 38 19	2.6 50 28	3.8 63 38	3.9 75 48	3.9 84 57	4 87 63	4.6 85 61	3.4 78 53	2.7 67 42	3.2 50 32	2.5 37 20
- █ Average max. and min. temperatures in °F
- █ Precipitation totals in inches
- Source: The Weather Channel
Metric conversion
J	F	M	A	M	J	J	A	S	O	N	D
47 0 −10	40 3 −7	67 10 −2	97 17 3	100 24 9	99 29 14	101 31 17	117 29 16	86 26 12	68 19 6	81 10 0	62 3 −7
- █ Average max. and min. temperatures in °C
- █ Precipitation totals in mm

In recent years, average temperatures in the county seat of Wheaton have ranged from a low of 14 °F (−10 °C) in January to a high of 87 °F (31 °C) in July, although a record low of −26 °F (−32 °C) was recorded in January 1985 and a record high of 105 °F (41 °C) was recorded in July 1995. Average monthly precipitation ranged from 1.56 inches (40 mm) in February to 4.60 inches (117 mm) in August.

=== Adjacent counties ===
Counties that are adjacent to DuPage include:

- Cook County (east and north)
- Will County (south)
- Kendall County (southwest; counties meet at a corner)
- Kane County (west)

== Demographics ==
Historical population
Census	Pop.	Note	%±
1840	3,535		—
1850	9,290		162.8%
1860	14,701		58.2%
1870	16,685		13.5%
1880	19,161		14.8%
1890	22,551		17.7%
1900	28,196		25.0%
1910	33,432		18.6%
1920	42,120		26.0%
1930	91,998		118.4%
1940	103,480		12.5%
1950	154,599		49.4%
1960	313,459		102.8%
1970	491,882		56.9%
1980	658,835		33.9%
1990	781,666		18.6%
2000	904,161		15.7%
2010	916,924		1.4%
2020	932,877		1.7%
2025 (est.)	934,298	▲	0.2%
U.S. Decennial Census; 1790-1960 1900-1990; 1990-2000 2010-2019

=== 2020 Census ===
As of the 2020 census, the county had a population of 932,877, and the median age was 40.1 years. 22.4% of residents were under the age of 18 and 16.5% were 65 years of age or older, and for every 100 females there were 95.9 males (93.4 males for every 100 females age 18 and over).

The racial makeup of the county was 66.1% White, 4.9% Black or African American, 0.6% American Indian and Alaska Native, 12.8% Asian, fewer than 0.1% Native Hawaiian and Pacific Islander, 6.7% from some other race, and 8.9% from two or more races, while Hispanic or Latino residents of any race comprised 15.5% of the population.

99.8% of residents lived in urban areas, while 0.2% lived in rural areas.

There were 348,216 households in the county, of which 32.4% had children under the age of 18 living in them, 55.9% were married-couple households, 15.3% were households with a male householder and no spouse or partner present, and 23.7% were households with a female householder and no spouse or partner present.

There were 364,970 housing units, of which 4.6% were vacant. Among occupied housing units, 72.3% were owner-occupied and 27.7% were renter-occupied, with a homeowner vacancy rate of 1.2% and a rental vacancy rate of 7.1%.

=== Racial and ethnic composition ===
DuPage County, Illinois – Racial and ethnic composition Note: the US Census treats Hispanic/Latino as an ethnic category. This table excludes Latinos from the racial categories and assigns them to a separate category. Hispanics/Latinos may be of any race.
Race / Ethnicity (NH = Non-Hispanic)	Pop 1980	Pop 1990	Pop 2000	Pop 2010	Pop 2020	% 1980	% 1990	% 2000	% 2010	% 2020
White alone (NH)	612,606	691,833	711,966	646,130	591,441	92.98%	88.51%	78.74%	70.47%	63.40%
Black or African American alone (NH)	7,742	15,119	26,977	41,024	44,201	1.18%	1.93%	2.98%	4.47%	4.74%
Native American or Alaska Native alone (NH)	545	844	912	992	873	0.08%	0.11%	0.10%	0.11%	0.09%
Asian alone (NH)	18,666	38,931	70,908	91,793	118,982	2.83%	4.98%	7.84%	10.01%	12.75%
Native Hawaiian or Pacific Islander alone (NH)	x	x	180	171	219	x	x	0.02%	0.02%	0.02%
Other race alone (NH)	1,974	372	870	1,181	3,299	0.30%	0.05%	0.10%	0.13%	0.35%
Mixed race or Multiracial (NH)	x	x	10,982	14,127	29,571	x	x	1.21%	1.54%	3.17%
Hispanic or Latino (any race)	17,302	34,567	81,366	121,506	144,291	2.63%	4.42%	9.00%	13.25%	15.47%
Total	658,835	781,666	904,161	916,924	932,877	100.00%	100.00%	100.00%	100.00%	100.00%

==== Racial / Ethnic Profile of places in DuPage County, Illinois (2020 census) ====
Racial / Ethnic Profile of places in DuPage County, Illinois (2020 Census)
Following is a table of towns and census designated places in DuPage County, Illinois. Data for the United States (with and without Puerto Rico), the state of Illinois, and DuPage County itself have been included for comparison purposes.
The majority racial/ethnic group is coded per the key below. Communities that extend into and adjacent county or counties are delineated with a ‡ followed by an accompanying explanatory note. The full population of each community has been tabulated including the population in adjacent counties.

Majority minority with no dominant group
Majority White
Majority Black
Majority Hispanic
Majority Asian

Racial and ethnic composition of places in DuPage County, Illinois (2020 Census) (NH = Non-Hispanic) Note: the US Census treats Hispanic/Latino as an ethnic category. This table excludes Latinos from the racial categories and assigns them to a separate category. Hispanics/Latinos may be of any race.
Place	Designation	Total Population	White alone (NH)	%	Black or African American alone (NH)	%	Native American or Alaska Native alone (NH)	%	Asian alone (NH)	%	Pacific Islander alone (NH)	%	Other race alone (NH)	%	Mixed race or Multiracial (NH)	%	Hispanic or Latino (any race)	%
United States of America (50 states and D.C.)	x	331,449,281	191,697,647	57.84%	39,940,338	12.05%	2,251,699	0.68%	19,618,719	5.92%	622,018	0.19%	1,689,833	0.51%	13,548,983	4.09%	62,080,044	18.73%
United States of America (50 states, D.C., and Puerto Rico)	x	334,735,155	191,722,195	57.28%	39,944,624	11.93%	2,252,011	0.67%	19,621,465	5.86%	622,109	0.19%	1,692,341	0.51%	13,551,323	4.05%	65,329,087	19.52%
Illinois	State	12,812,508	7,472,751	58.32%	1,775,612	13.86%	16,561	0.13%	747,280	5.83%	2,959	0.02%	45,080	0.35%	414,855	3.24%	2,337,410	18.24%
DuPage County	County	932,877	591,441	63.40%	44,201	4.74%	873	0.09%	118,982	12.75%	219	0.02%	3,299	0.35%	29,571	3.17%	144,291	15.47%
Aurora ‡	City	180,542	61,017	33.80%	18,930	10.49%	207	0.11%	19,659	10.89%	61	0.03%	655	0.36%	5,032	2.79%	74,981	41.53%
Batavia ‡	City	26,098	21,479	82.30%	608	2.33%	11	0.04%	583	2.23%	2	0.01%	77	0.30%	944	3.62%	2,394	9.17%
Chicago ‡	City	2,746,388	863,622	31.45%	787,551	28.68%	3,332	0.12%	189,857	6.91%	529	0.02%	11,536	0.42%	70,443	2.56%	819,518	29.84%
Darien	City	22,011	15,882	72.15%	738	3.35%	4	0.02%	2,855	12.97%	15	0.07%	70	0.32%	597	2.71%	1,850	8.40%
Elmhurst ‡	City	45,786	35,971	78.56%	931	2.03%	41	0.09%	2,942	6.43%	7	0.02%	148	0.32%	1,477	3.23%	4,269	9.32%
Naperville ‡	City	149,540	92,603	61.93%	7,326	4.90%	104	0.07%	33,269	22.25%	44	0.03%	612	0.41%	5,208	3.48%	10,374	6.94%
Oakbrook Terrace	City	2,751	1,609	58.49%	246	8.94%	4	0.15%	487	17.70%	1	0.04%	16	0.58%	80	2.91%	308	11.20%
St. Charles ‡	City	33,081	26,099	78.89%	562	1.70%	25	0.08%	1,440	4.35%	4	0.01%	102	0.31%	1,125	3.40%	3,724	11.26%
Warrenville	City	13,553	8,648	63.81%	386	2.85%	18	0.13%	676	4.99%	3	0.02%	40	0.30%	536	3.95%	3,246	23.95%
West Chicago	City	25,614	8,906	34.77%	701	2.74%	45	0.18%	2,028	7.92%	0	0.00%	103	0.40%	549	2.14%	13,282	51.85%
Wheaton	City	53,970	41,819	77.49%	2,251	4.17%	41	0.08%	4,021	7.45%	4	0.01%	201	0.37%	2,129	3.94%	3,504	6.49%
Wood Dale	City	14,012	8,970	64.02%	240	1.71%	8	0.06%	846	6.04%	0	0.00%	35	0.25%	268	1.91%	3,645	26.01%
Addison	Village	35,702	14,710	41.20%	1,166	3.27%	40	0.11%	2,867	8.03%	3	0.01%	107	0.30%	524	1.47%	16,285	45.61%
Bartlett ‡	Village	41,105	26,377	64.17%	995	2.42%	31	0.08%	7,345	17.87%	6	0.01%	95	0.23%	1,309	3.18%	4,947	12.04%
Bensenville ‡	Village	18,813	7,065	37.55%	735	3.91%	23	0.12%	921	4.90%	0	0.00%	54	0.29%	317	1.69%	9,698	51.55%
Bloomingdale	Village	22,382	14,747	65.89%	791	3.53%	39	0.17%	3,392	15.16%	1	0.00%	61	0.27%	601	2.69%	2,750	12.29%
Bolingbrook ‡	Village	73,922	26,735	36.17%	14,120	19.10%	86	0.12%	10,160	13.74%	12	0.02%	294	0.40%	2,667	3.61%	19,848	26.85%
Burr Ridge ‡	Village	11,192	8,212	73.37%	208	1.86%	5	0.04%	1,834	16.39%	0	0.00%	27	0.24%	297	2.65%	609	5.44%
Carol Stream	Village	39,854	21,547	54.06%	2,685	6.74%	20	0.05%	7,427	18.64%	4	0.01%	175	0.44%	1,144	2.87%	6,852	17.19%
Clarendon Hills	Village	8,702	6,910	79.41%	123	1.41%	3	0.03%	731	8.40%	0	0.00%	31	0.36%	385	4.42%	519	5.96%
Downers Grove	Village	50,247	40,289	80.18%	1,801	3.58%	34	0.07%	2,919	5.81%	13	0.03%	118	0.23%	1,664	3.31%	3,409	6.78%
Elk Grove Village ‡	Village	32,812	23,320	71.07%	599	1.83%	39	0.12%	3,919	11.94%	4	0.01%	80	0.24%	862	2.63%	3,989	12.16%
Glendale Heights	Village	33,176	10,599	31.95%	2,322	7.00%	39	0.12%	8,329	25.11%	12	0.04%	147	0.44%	839	2.53%	10,889	32.82%
Glen Ellyn	Village	28,846	22,277	77.23%	947	3.28%	10	0.03%	2,341	8.12%	8	0.03%	56	0.19%	1,051	3.64%	2,156	7.47%
Hanover Park ‡	Village	37,470	11,885	31.72%	2,537	6.77%	59	0.16%	6,326	16.88%	20	0.05%	158	0.42%	924	2.47%	15,561	41.53%
Hinsdale ‡	Village	17,395	13,226	76.03%	282	1.62%	15	0.09%	2,161	12.42%	4	0.02%	54	0.31%	705	4.05%	948	5.45%
Itasca	Village	9,543	6,633	69.51%	214	2.24%	13	0.14%	1,029	10.78%	0	0.00%	37	0.39%	266	2.79%	1,351	14.16%
Lemont ‡	Village	17,629	15,370	87.19%	147	0.83%	2	0.01%	422	2.39%	6	0.03%	23	0.13%	404	2.29%	1,255	7.12%
Lisle	Village	24,223	15,927	65.75%	1,447	5.97%	27	0.11%	3,680	15.19%	7	0.03%	102	0.42%	870	3.59%	2,163	8.93%
Lombard	Village	44,476	30,503	68.58%	2,014	4.53%	52	0.12%	5,821	13.09%	4	0.01%	138	0.31%	1,423	3.20%	4,521	10.17%
Oak Brook ‡	Village	8,163	4,648	56.94%	149	1.83%	5	0.06%	2,678	32.81%	2	0.02%	40	0.49%	245	3.00%	396	4.85%
Roselle ‡	Village	22,897	16,551	72.28%	557	2.43%	21	0.09%	2,422	10.58%	9	0.04%	80	0.35%	648	2.83%	2,609	11.39%
Schaumburg ‡	Village	78,723	43,739	55.56%	3,266	4.15%	105	0.13%	20,767	26.38%	11	0.01%	268	0.34%	2,304	2.93%	8,263	10.50%
Villa Park	Village	22,263	13,950	62.66%	995	4.47%	32	0.14%	1,348	6.05%	3	0.01%	85	0.38%	766	3.44%	5,084	22.84%
Wayne ‡	Village	2,286	1,861	81.41%	15	0.66%	2	0.09%	167	7.31%	0	0.00%	11	0.48%	47	2.06%	183	8.01%
Westmont	Village	24,429	15,243	62.40%	1,683	6.89%	30	0.12%	3,576	14.64%	14	0.06%	74	0.30%	702	2.87%	3,107	12.72%
Willow Springs ‡	Village	5,857	4,679	79.89%	77	1.31%	15	0.26%	202	3.45%	0	0.00%	15	0.26%	154	2.63%	715	12.21%
Willowbrook	Village	9,236	6,486	70.23%	407	4.41%	7	0.08%	1,333	14.43%	3	0.03%	12	0.13%	255	2.76%	733	7.94%
Winfield	Village	9,835	8,001	81.35%	148	1.50%	2	0.02%	510	5.19%	0	0.00%	13	0.13%	387	3.93%	774	7.87%
Woodridge ‡	Village	34,158	19,880	58.20%	3,346	9.80%	41	0.12%	4,519	13.23%	15	0.04%	150	0.44%	1,152	3.37%	5,055	14.80%

=== 2022 American Community Survey ===
The largest European ancestries reported among DuPage County residents in the 2022 American Community Survey are German (147,639 people or 16% of the population), Irish (112,329 people, 12.2%), Polish (89,682, 9.7%), Italian (82,745, 9%), and English (62,404, 6.8%). The largest Hispanic group in the county is Mexican Americans, numbering 106,907 and making up 11.6% of the county's population, and over 70% of the total Hispanic population. The most common Asian ancestries in the county are Indian (59,305, or 6.4% of the total population), Filipino (20,141, 2.2%), Chinese (17,031, 1.8%), and Pakistani (11,046, 1.2%).

The population of DuPage County has become more diverse. The population of foreign-born residents increased from about 71,300 in 1990 to 184,000 by 2022 estimates. Of the 20% of residents who were born abroad, 45.2% were born in Asia, 25.8% were born in Latin America, 24.3% were born in Europe, 3.5% were born in Africa, 3.1% were born in South America, 0.2% were born in Oceania, and 1.1% were born in Canada. The top countries of birth for immigrants in DuPage County are Mexico (36,146), India (35,486), Poland (14,107), the Philippines (11,352), and China (10,116).

The per-capita income in DuPage County was $88,588 according to 2022 data from the Bureau of Economic Analysis. This was the second highest of any county in Illinois, surpassed only by that of Lake County, located north of Chicago. As of 2022, DuPage County has a poverty rate of 6.7%, much lower than the national and state average. 8% of children under 18 and 6% of seniors in the county are in poverty.

=== 2010 Census ===
There were 325,601 households, out of which 37.00% had children under the age of 18 living with them, 60.90% were married couples living together, 7.90% had a female householder with no husband present and 28.00% were non-families. 22.90% of all households were made up of individuals, and 6.80% had someone living alone who was 65 years of age or older. The average household size was 2.73 and the average family size was 3.27.

In the county, 26.70% of the population was under the age of 18, 8.20% was from 18 to 24, 32.40% from 25 to 44, 22.80% from 45 to 64 and 9.80% was 65 years of age or older. The median age was 35 years. For every 100 females, there were 97.20 males. For every 100 females, age 18 and over, there were 94.20 males.

The median income for a household in the county was $98,441 and the median income for a family was $113,086. Males had a median income of $60,909 versus $41,346 for females. The mean or average income for a family in DuPage County is $121,009, according to the 2005 census. The per capita income for the county was $38,458. About 2.40% of families and 3.60% of the population were below the poverty line, including 3.90% of those under age 18 and 4.30% of those age 65 or over.

=== Religion ===
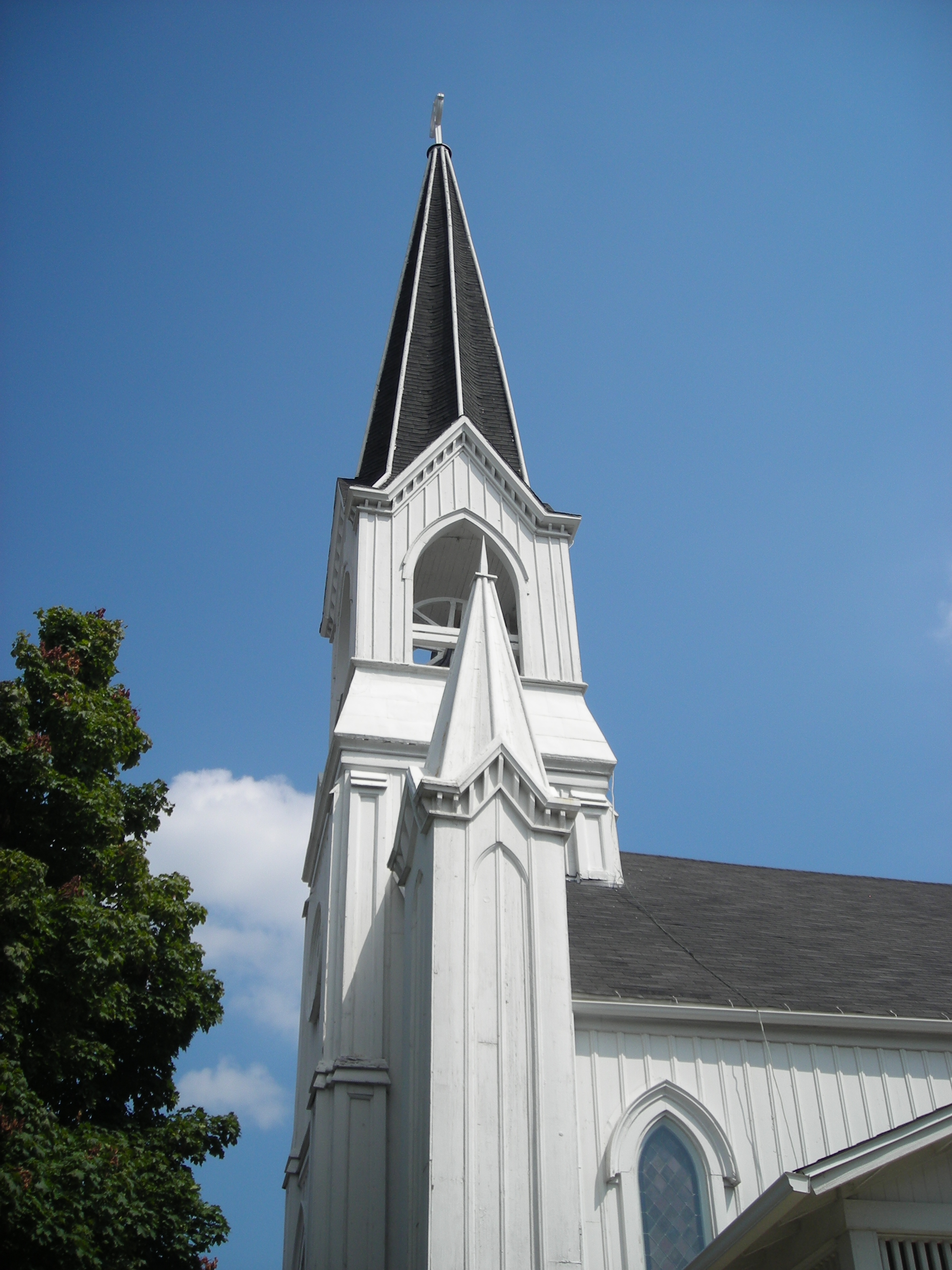
The First Church of Lombard is listed on the National Register of Historic Places.

DuPage County has several hundred Christian churches, and especially around Wheaton is a Bible Belt, with Wheaton College and various other evangelical Christian colleges, and publishing houses including InterVarsity Press, Crossway, Tyndale House, Christianity Today and other smaller ones in the area. Notable churches include megachurches like Community Christian Church in Naperville, Wheaton Bible Church, Christ Church in Oak Brook, and other large congregations like College Church. There is also a large Catholic population, the county being part of the Diocese of Joliet and the National Shrine of St Therese in Darien. There is also the Ukrainian Orthodox Church in Glendale Heights.

The Theosophical Society in America in Wheaton, the North American headquarters of the Theosophical Society Adyar, provides lectures and classes on theosophy, meditation, yoga, Eastern and New Age spirituality. Islamic mosques are located in Villa Park, Naperville (two mosques), Glendale Heights, Willowbrook, Westmont, Lombard, Bolingbrook, Addison, Woodale, West Chicago, and unincorporated Glen Ellyn. There are Hindu temples in Bartlett, Bensenville, Bloomingdale, Carol Stream, Itasca and Medinah, and an Arya Samaj center in West Chicago. There is a Nichiren Shōshū Zen Buddhist temple in West Chicago and a Theravada Buddhist Temple, called the Buddha-Dharma Meditation Center, in Willowbrook. There is also a Reform synagogue, Congregation Etz Chaim, in Lombard and an unaffiliated one in Naperville, called Congregation Beth Shalom.

== Economy ==
DuPage County is the primary location of the Illinois Technology and Research Corridor. It is home to many large corporations, including:

- Ace Hardware (Oak Brook)
- Arthur J. Gallagher & Co. (Itasca) (Fortune 1000)
- BP (formerly British Petroleum) (Warrenville)
- DeVry Inc. (Oakbrook Terrace) (NYSE)
- Dover Corporation (Downers Grove) (Fortune 500)
- Eby-Brown (Naperville)
- Hub Group (Oak Brook) (Fortune 1000)
- Molex (Lisle) (Fortune 1000)
- Nalco Water (Naperville) (Fortune 1000)
- Bandai Namco (Bensenville)
- Navistar International (Lisle) (Fortune Global 500)
- Nicor Gas (Naperville) (Fortune 1000)
- OfficeMax (Naperville) (Fortune 500)
- Sara Lee Corporation (Downers Grove) (Fortune 500)
- Tellabs (Naperville) (Fortune 1000)
- Ty Warner (Beanie Babies) (Westmont)

Shopping malls in DuPage County include Oakbrook Center, which is the largest open-air mall in the nation, Fox Valley Mall, Yorktown Center and Town Square Wheaton. In addition, many of DuPage County's towns have prosperous and quaint downtown areas, especially in Naperville, Glen Ellyn, Elmhurst, Wheaton, Downers Grove and Hinsdale, which are mixed with boutiques, upscale chain stores and restaurants.

=== National Laboratories ===
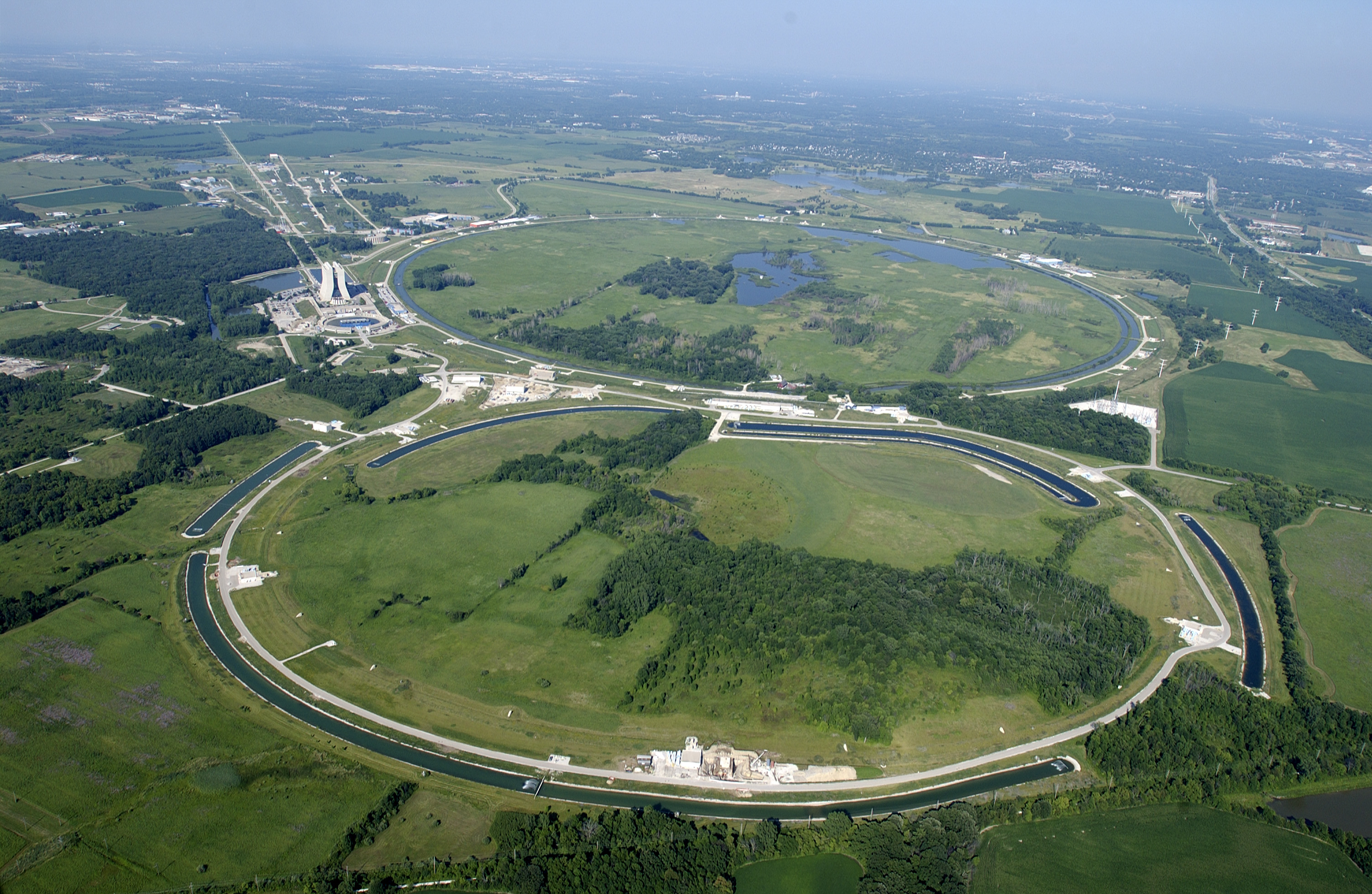
Aerial view of the Tevatron particle accelerator at the Fermilab site

Fermilab, which has the world's second-highest-energy particle accelerator, is in Batavia, where it straddles the border between Kane and DuPage counties.

Argonne National Laboratory, one of the United States government's oldest and largest science and engineering research laboratories, is in unincorporated, southeast DuPage County. Both laboratories conduct tours of their facilities.

== Arts and culture ==
=== Architecture ===
The 31-story Oakbrook Terrace Tower in Oakbrook Terrace, designed by Helmut Jahn, is the tallest building in Illinois outside of Chicago. The Elmhurst Art Museum is housed in a Mies Van Der Rohe building. There is a Frank Lloyd Wright house in Elmhurst. Bochasanwasi Akshar Purushottam Swaminarayan Sanstha, a conservative Hindu sect, has built BAPS Shri Swaminarayan Mandir Chicago, a large, intricately carved, marble temple in Bartlett. There are some Sears Catalog Homes in Downers Grove and Villa Park. The Byzantine-style clubhouse of the Medinah Country Club is also an architectural highlight of the county. Lombard is home to over thirty Lustron prefabricated steel homes.

Showcasing the county’s prehistory, the Perry Mastodon, excavated in Glen Ellyn in 1963, is visible on display at Wheaton College. In 1977, a 13,000 year old mammoth was excavated in Roy C. Blackwell Forest Preserve.

=== Museums and historical sites ===
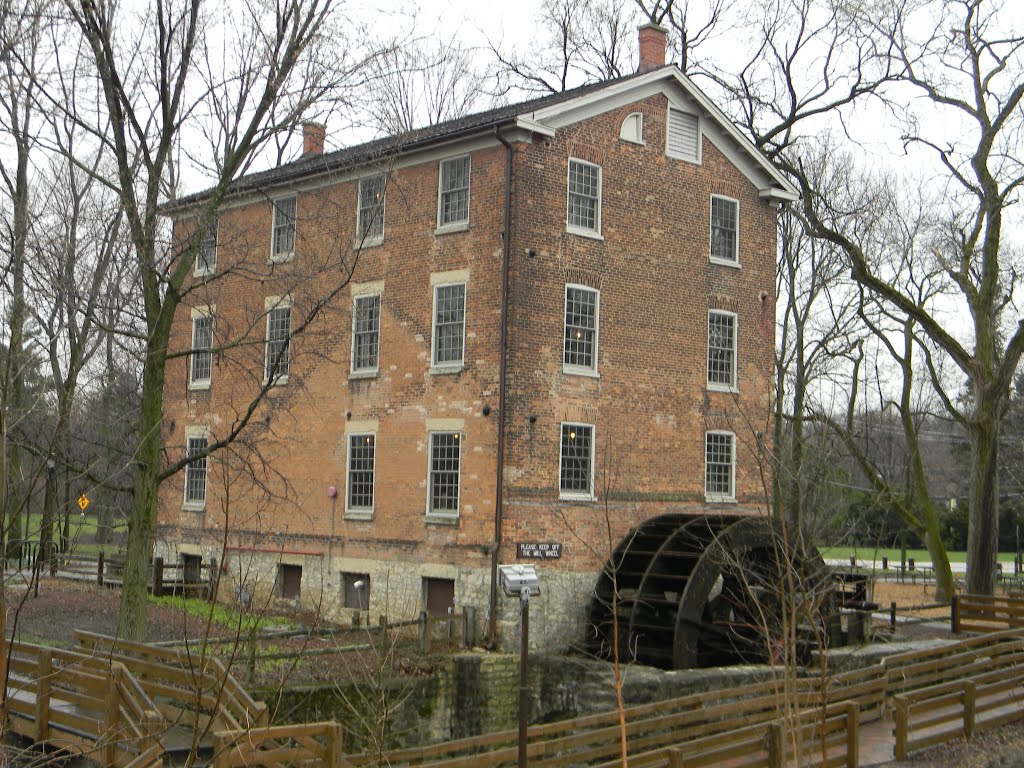
Graue Mill

Historical museums in DuPage County include:

- Cantigny Park and First Division Museum, on the former estate of Chicago Tribune magnate Robert R. McCormick (Wheaton)
- Downers Grove Museum (Downers Grove)
- DuPage County Historical Museum, formerly the Adams Memorial Library (Wheaton)
- Graue Mill (Oak Brook)
- Gregg House Museum (Westmont)
- Itasca Historical Depot Museum (Itasca)
- Kline Creek Farm (West Chicago)
- Mayslake Peabody Estate (Oak Brook)
- The Museums at Lisle Station Park (Lisle)
- Naper Settlement (Naperville)
- Villa Park Historical Society Museum (Villa Park)
- West Chicago City Museum (West Chicago)

Specialty museums in DuPage County include:

- Cleve Carney Museum of Art (Glen Ellyn)
- DuPage Children's Museum (Naperville)
- Elmhurst Art Museum, which includes Mies Van Der Rohe's McCormick House (Elmhurst)
- Lizzadro Museum of Lapidary Art (Oak Brook)
- Wheaton College (Wheaton)
  - Billy Graham Center
  - Marion E. Wade Center

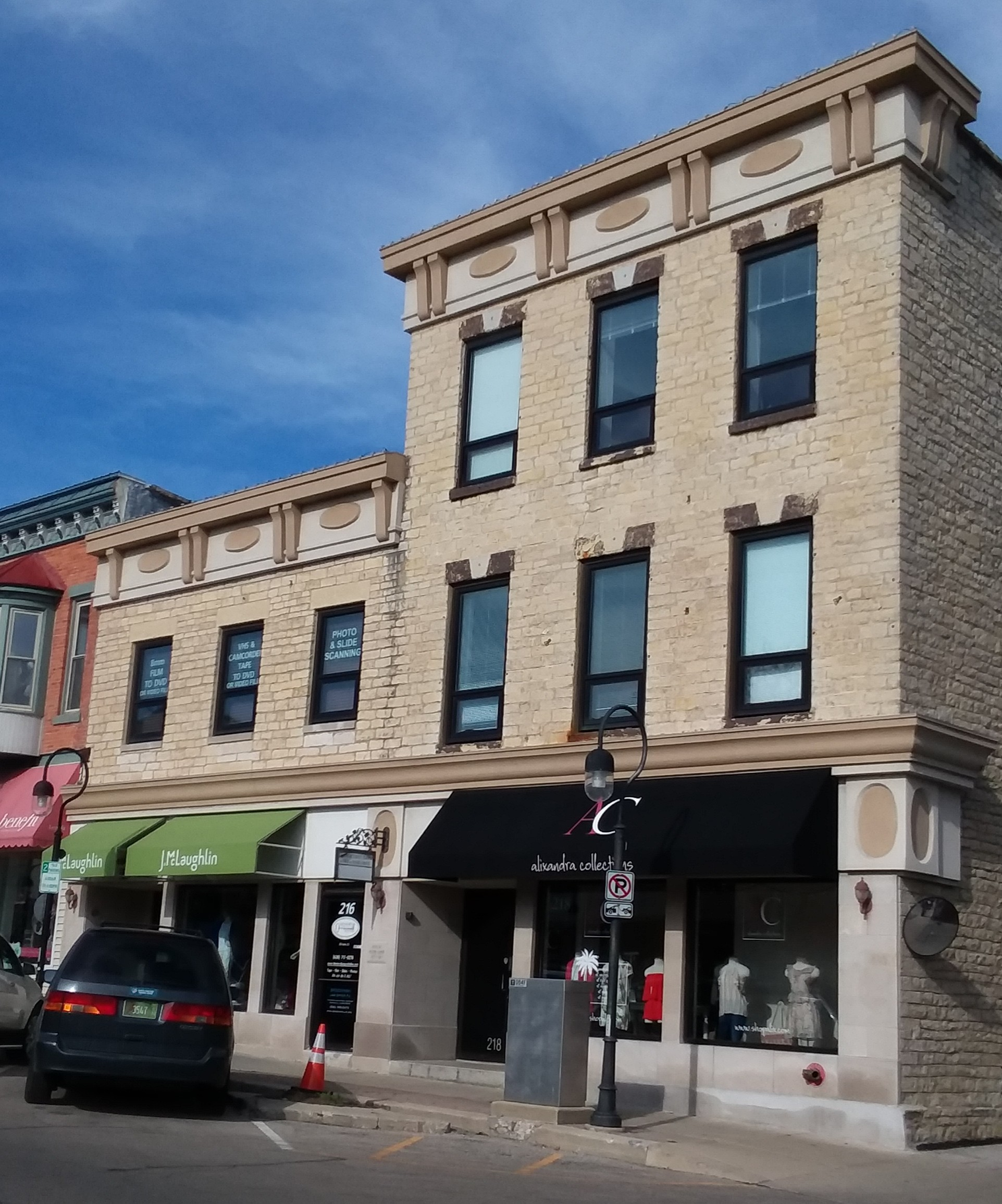
Joe Naper's General Store in Naperville

Historical sites include:

- Downtown Hinsdale Historic District
- DuPage County Courthouse (Wheaton)
- Glen Ellyn Main Street Historic District
- Joe Naper's General Store (Naperville)
- Naperville Historic District
- Old Nichols Library (Naperville)
- Pioneer Park, monument to the pioneer men and women of DuPage County and site of Bailey Hobson's mill (Naperville)
- Stacy's Tavern (Glen Ellyn)
- Wayne Village Historic District

=== Music and theater ===
DuPage also plays host to a rich local music scene. Some of the better-known bands to come out of the area include The Hush Sound, Lucky Boys Confusion, and Plain White T's.

Oakbrook Terrace's Drury Lane Theatre is an important live theatre in DuPage County. The Tivoli Theatre, one of the first theatres in the United States to be equipped with sound, is still in use in Downers Grove. In addition to showing movies, the Tivoli is home to several local performing arts groups. The McAninch Arts Center located on the Glen Ellyn campus of the College of DuPage also presents a variety of music, dance, theater and comedy year round both on its three indoor stages and its outdoor Lakeside Pavilion.

== Parks and recreation ==
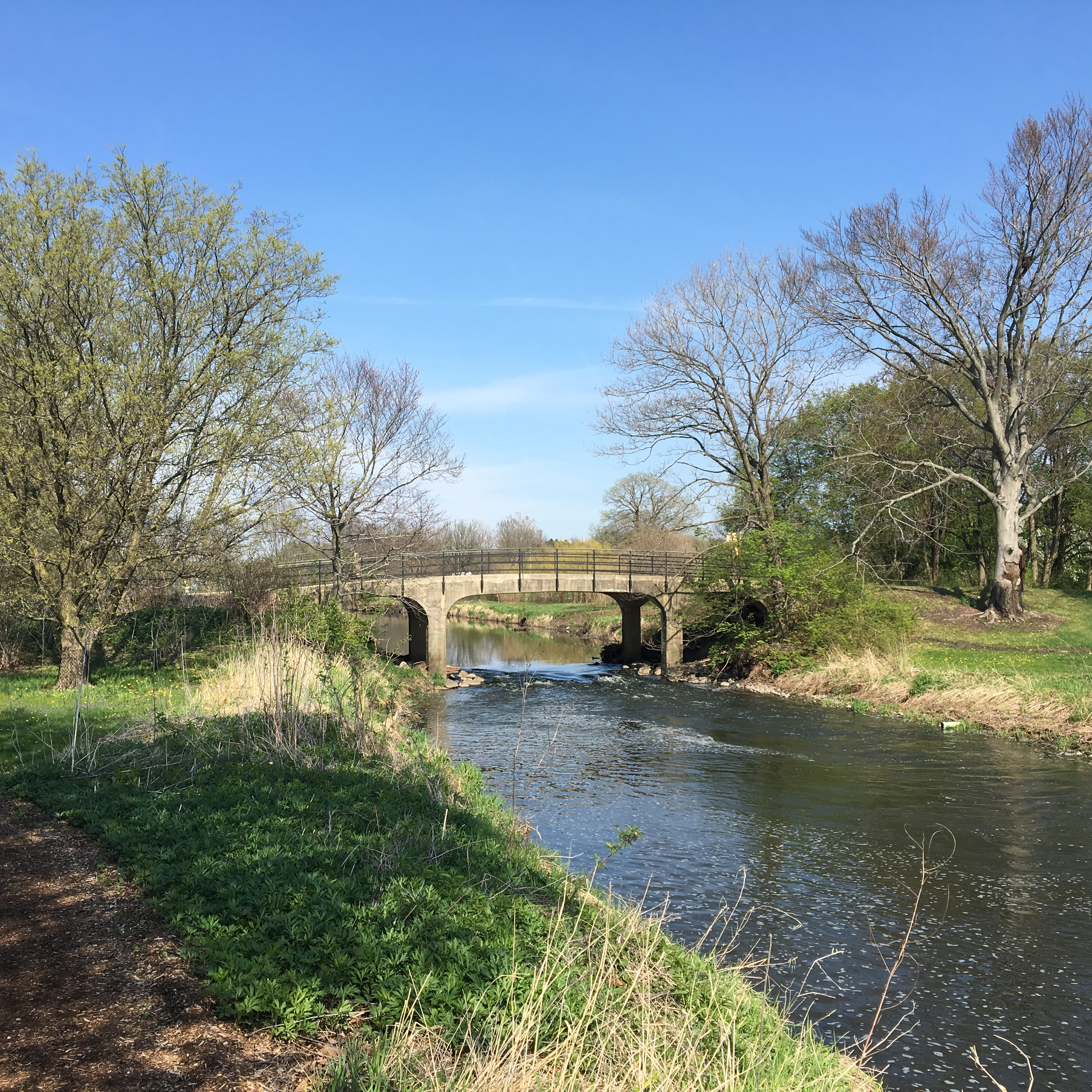
Morton Arboretum in Lisle

The Forest Preserve District of DuPage County owns and manages 25,000 acres (10,000 ha) of prairies, woodlands and wetlands. More than 4 million visitors each year enjoy 60 forest preserves, 145 miles of trails, and five education centers.

Local urban parks include Lombard's Lilacia Park, Naperville's Centennial Beach, Woodridge's Cypress Cove Family Aquatic Park and Wheaton's Cosley Zoo. Privately funded attractions include Lisle's Morton Arboretum.

In the 1980s, DuPage County also had another major attraction, Ebenezer Floppen Slopper's Wonderful Water slides in Oakbrook Terrace, which today, stands abandoned and neglected.

The Illinois Prairie Path, a 61-mile (98 km) rail-to-trail multi-use path, runs through Cook, DuPage and Kane Counties. It intersects with the Great Western Trail at several points, as well as the Fox River Trail at a few points.

DuPage golf courses include: Wheaton's Chicago Golf Club, Arrowhead Golf Club and Cantigny Golf courses; the Medinah Country Club; the Village Links and Glen Oak Country Club of Glen Ellyn; Addison's Oak Meadows; Oak Brook's Oak Brook Golf Club, Butler National Golf Club, and Butterfield Country Club; Wood Dale's Maple Meadows; Westmont's Green Meadows; Lisle's River Bend (9 holes); West Chicago's St. Andrews Golf & Country Club and Winfield's Klein Creek Golf Club, among others.

== Government ==
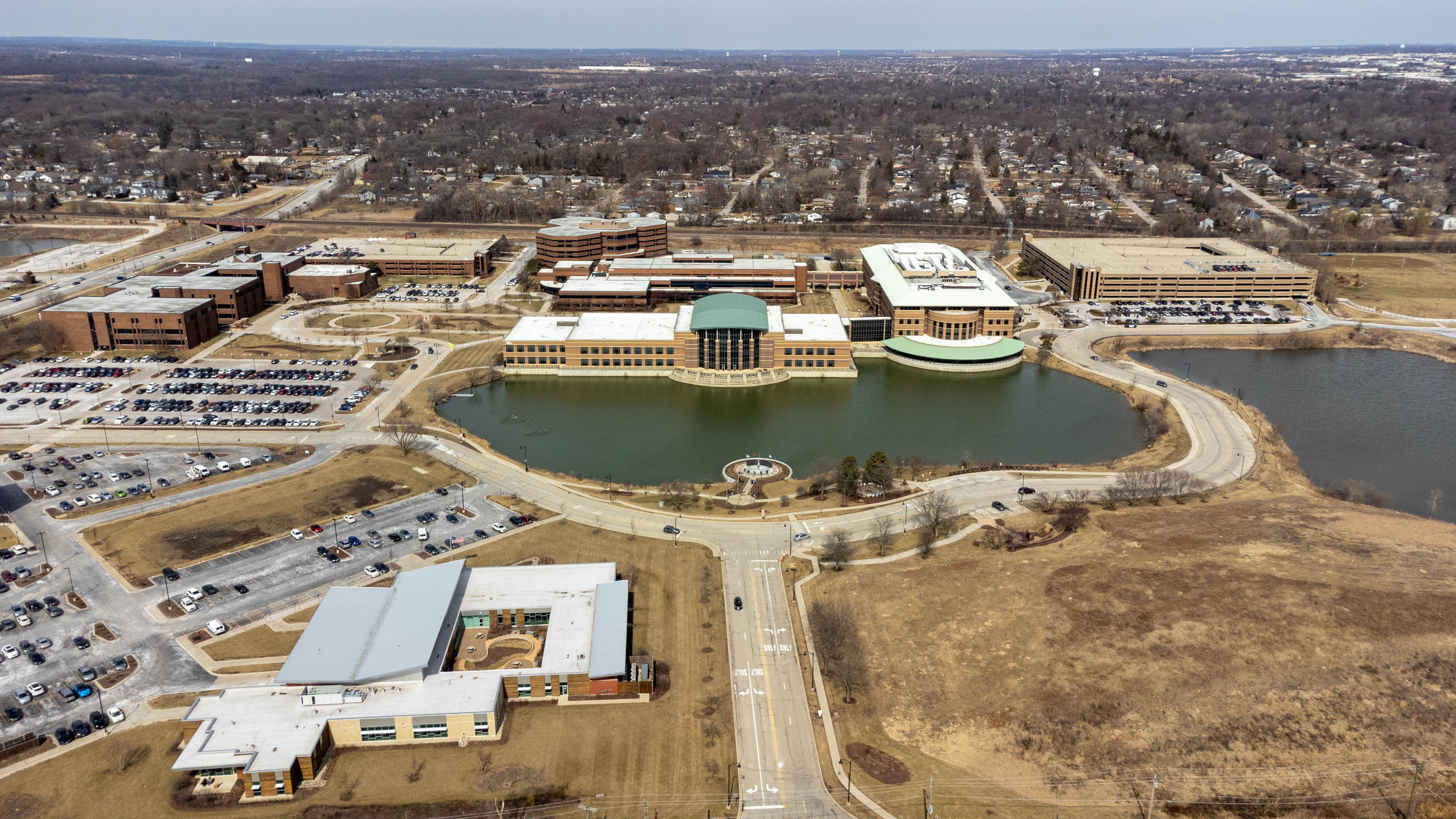
The DuPage County Courthouse complex in Wheaton

DuPage County is governed by a County Board whose duties include managing county funds and business, levying taxes, and appropriating funds. The County Board exercises powers not assigned to other elected officials or other boards.

The county is divided into six districts. Each district elects three members to the County Board in staggered two-year and four-year terms. The Chairman of the County Board is the chief executive officer of DuPage County, and is elected countywide every four years.

DuPage County is part of Regional Office of Education #19 which is coterminous with the county's corporate boundaries.

As of December 2022, the DuPage County Board is controlled by the Democratic Party by a 12 to 6 margin. After the 2026 midterm elections, the DuPage County Board will be controlled by the Democratic Party by a 17 to 1 margin.

DuPage County Board (as of 2024)
District	Board Member	Party	Elected
Chairman	Deb Conroy	Democratic	2022
1	Cindy Cronin Cahill	Republican	2022
1	Michael Childress	Democratic	2022
1	Sam Tornatore	Republican	2012
2	Paula Deacon Garcia	Democratic	2020
2	Andrew Honig	Democratic	2024
2	Yeena Yoo	Democratic	2022
3	Lucy Chang Evans	Democratic	2022
3	Kari Galassi	Republican	2022
3	Brian Krajewski	Republican	2010
4	Grant Eckhoff	Republican	2002
4	Lynn LaPlante	Democratic	2020
4	Mary FitzGerald Ozog	Democratic	2018
5	Sadia Covert	Democratic	2018
5	Dawn DeSart	Democratic	2018
5	Saba Haider	Democratic	2024
6	Melissa Martinez	Democratic	2025
6	Greg Schwarze	Democratic	2020
6	Jim Zay	Republican	1999

== Politics ==
DuPage County was historically a stronghold of the Republican Party, and a classic bastion of suburban conservatism. In recent years, DuPage County has joined other inner-ring suburbs outside large U.S. cities trending Democratic in presidential election years since the 1990s. The county also leans increasingly Democratic in state and local politics. In the 2018 Illinois gubernatorial election, J. B. Pritzker became the first Democratic candidate for the governorship to win the county in nearly 100 years. DuPage County voters backed Pritzker in his 2022 re-election bid by a large margin, and did so again in his 2026 re-election for a third term; this time by a record-shattering margin of more than 30 percentage points.

=== National politics ===
United States presidential election results for DuPage County, Illinois
Year	Republican		Democratic		Third party(ies)	
Year	No.	%	No.	%	No.	%
1892	2,478	50.35%	2,154	43.76%	290	5.89%
1896	4,115	68.92%	1,588	26.60%	268	4.49%
1900	3,869	63.92%	1,947	32.17%	237	3.92%
1904	4,078	68.07%	1,407	23.49%	506	8.45%
1908	4,530	63.98%	1,975	27.90%	575	8.12%
1912	1,136	14.27%	2,236	28.09%	4,589	57.64%
1916	9,610	62.84%	4,816	31.49%	868	5.68%
1920	12,280	82.00%	2,084	13.92%	612	4.09%
1924	16,917	72.81%	1,893	8.15%	4,423	19.04%
1928	28,016	72.37%	10,479	27.07%	217	0.56%
1932	25,758	56.23%	18,547	40.49%	1,504	3.28%
1936	28,380	54.97%	21,684	42.00%	1,568	3.04%
1940	40,746	67.85%	18,923	31.51%	380	0.63%
1944	41,890	68.93%	18,711	30.79%	174	0.29%
1948	45,794	73.58%	15,528	24.95%	916	1.47%
1952	71,134	75.80%	22,489	23.97%	217	0.23%
1956	91,834	79.76%	23,103	20.06%	207	0.18%
1960	101,014	69.45%	44,263	30.43%	168	0.12%
1964	98,871	59.89%	66,229	40.11%	0	0.00%
1968	124,893	66.61%	48,492	25.86%	14,111	7.53%
1972	172,341	75.02%	57,043	24.83%	355	0.15%
1976	175,055	68.77%	72,137	28.34%	7,355	2.89%
1980	182,308	64.02%	68,991	24.23%	33,450	11.75%
1984	227,141	75.66%	71,430	23.79%	1,644	0.55%
1988	217,907	69.39%	94,285	30.02%	1,862	0.59%
1992	178,271	48.05%	114,564	30.88%	78,152	21.07%
1996	164,630	50.74%	129,709	39.97%	30,147	9.29%
2000	201,037	55.18%	152,550	41.87%	10,775	2.96%
2004	218,902	54.39%	180,097	44.75%	3,447	0.86%
2008	183,626	43.93%	228,698	54.72%	5,649	1.35%
2012	195,046	48.63%	199,460	49.73%	6,575	1.64%
2016	166,415	38.64%	228,622	53.08%	35,637	8.27%
2020	193,611	39.69%	281,222	57.66%	12,930	2.65%
2024	191,243	41.51%	251,164	54.52%	18,261	3.96%

The county supported Barack Obama, a Chicago resident, in 2008 and 2012 (albeit narrowly in 2012). Obama was the first Democratic presidential nominee to win the county since Franklin Pierce in 1852. The only time prior to 2008 that a Republican had failed to win the county was in 1912, when the GOP was mortally divided and former president and Progressive Party nominee Theodore Roosevelt won over half the county's vote. As a measure of how Republican DuPage was at the time, it was one of the few counties where Franklin D. Roosevelt was shut out in all four of his successful campaigns, and it also rejected Lyndon Johnson in his 44-state landslide of 1964. FDR and LBJ were the only Democrats to win 40 percent of the county's vote in the 20th century, and Bill Clinton was the only other Democrat to come remotely close to that figure.

DuPage County was historically a fiscally and socially conservative Republican stronghold, though in recent years has become more politically liberal especially on issues of race and immigration. In recent years, DuPage County has been shifting more Democratic; it has not supported a Republican for president since George W. Bush in 2004. Obama carried it four years later with a margin almost as large as Bush's 2004 total. The Democratic trend culminated with Joe Biden winning nearly 58% of the vote in 2020. Donald Trump was the first Republican nominee for president since 1912 to get less than 40% of the DuPage County vote, both in the 2016 and 2020 general elections. Many DuPage County communities which normally vote Republican, including but not limited to Naperville, Lisle, Wheaton, Glen Ellyn, Carol Stream, Downers Grove, and Elmhurst did not support Trump in 2016. In December 2019, shortly after the U.S. House of Representatives voted to impeach Donald Trump, Carol Stream-based Christianity Today published a controversial editorial calling for the removal of Trump from office, citing the need to hold him to the same standards to which they held Bill Clinton in the 1990s (who was the last Democratic nominee for president to get less than 40% of the DuPage County vote).

In the U.S. House of Representatives, DuPage County is in the 3rd, 4th, 6th, 8th, 11th and districts. In the 2018 general election, despite the county's historical Republican dominance, Democrats won every congressional district within the county.

=== Local politics ===
Republicans historically controlled local politics in DuPage County from the nineteenth century until modern times. During the twentieth century, Democrats only held countywide office twice. In 1934 William Robinson was elected Circuit Clerk and Arthur Hellyer was elected Treasurer. That year also saw the first ever Democratic majority county board and only such majority that century. Robinson and Hellyer each served one term; Robinson lost his bid for a full term in 1936 and Hellyer left the Treasurer's office to make a failed bid for probate judge in 1938. In 2018, as part of a larger suburban realignment, Democratic candidate Jean Kaczmarek won the election for County Clerk and Daniel Hebreard won the President of the Forest Preserve District of DuPage County.

During that same period Democrats were sporadically elected to the county board and township government. In 1972, Don Carroll was elected to the County Board. In the Democratic wave of 1974, Jane Spirgel, Mary Eleanor Wall, and Elaine Libovicz were elected. All four were from the northeastern portion of DuPage, which at that time was the most Democratic region of the county. Eventually, Republicans regained all seats on the board when Jane Spirgel ran for Illinois Secretary of State with Adlai Stevenson III under the Solidarity Party banner. In 2000, Linda J. Bourke Hilbert was elected. Like her 1970s counterparts, she was from the northeastern portion of the county. During the 2008 Democratic wave, three Democrats were elected to the board. After the initial Obama wave, Republicans reasserted themselves on the board and by 2017 Democrats held only one of the eighteen board seats. In the 2018 general election, Democrats won seven seats as well as the offices of County Clerk and Forest Preserve District President.

In 1973, a slate of Democrats took eight of nine offices in Addison Township. This feat would not be replicated until 2017 when Democratic candidates won a majority of offices in Naperville and Lisle townships. Between these two victories, Democrats only held two township offices. Mark Starkovich served as York Township Supervisor from 1989 to 1993 and Martin McManamon has served as Wayne Township Highway Commissioner since 2013.

In 2020, Democrats won control of the DuPage County Board, expanding on their 2018 lead. In 2022, Democrats expanded their majority in the County Board to 11 seats out of 18, and in 2026, Democrats further expanded their majority on the County Board to control 17 out of the 18 seats, resulting in only one Republican left on the County Board, in a complete reversal of the 17-1 Republican majority as recently as 2017. Concurrently, Democrat Deb Conroy was elected as the chairman of the County Board.

== Education ==
=== Colleges and universities ===
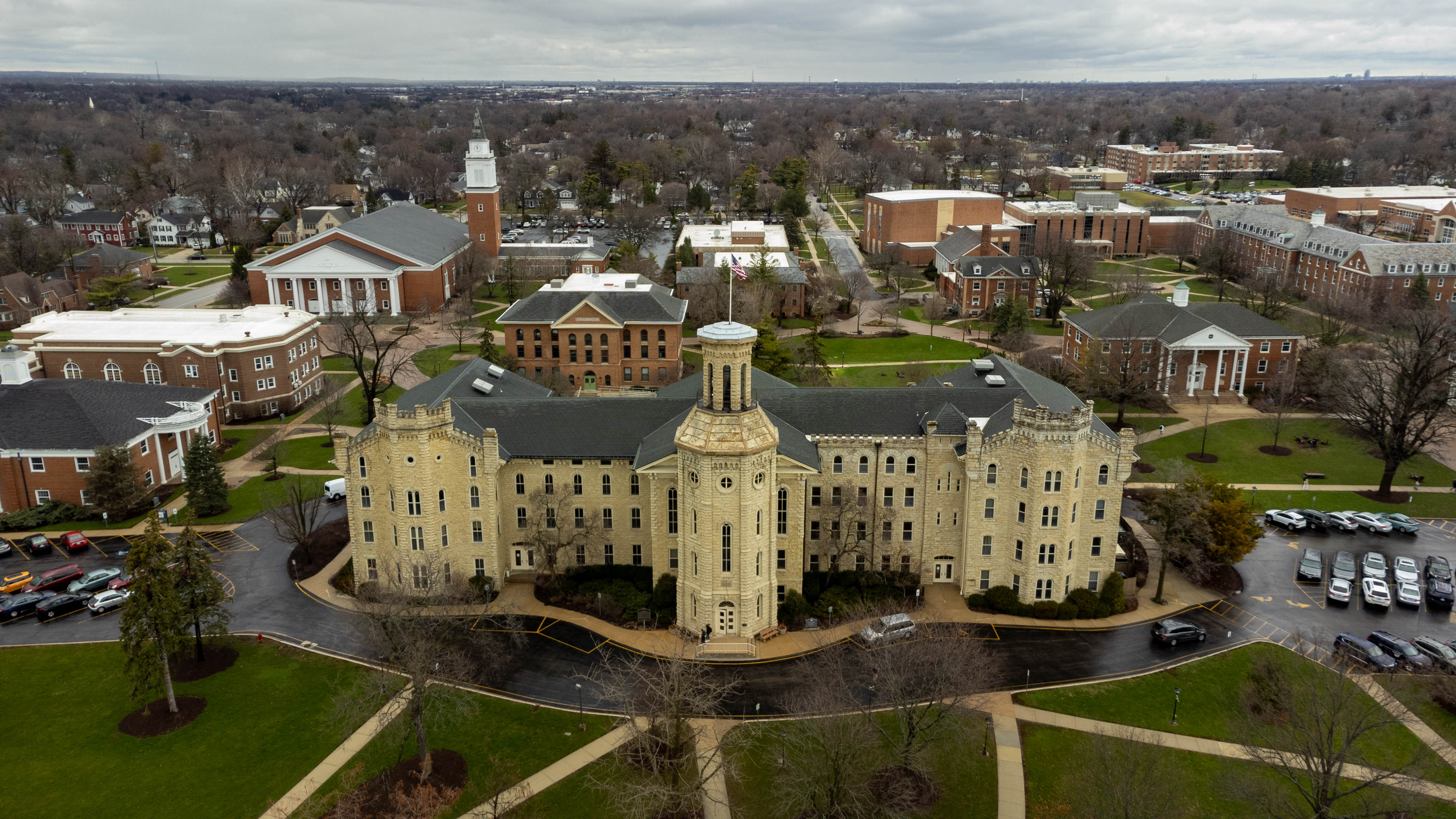
Blanchard Hall at Wheaton College is listed on the National Register of Historic Places.

The College of DuPage, in Glen Ellyn, is one of the largest community colleges in the United States. Wheaton College is one of the most well-known evangelical Christian colleges in the country. Benedictine University, Elmhurst University and North Central College also have long histories in their communities.

Other prominent colleges and universities include: Midwestern University and the Chicago College of Osteopathic Medicine in Downers Grove; National University of Health Sciences in Lombard; Northern Seminary and National Louis University in Lisle; the Addison and Naperville campuses of DeVry University; the Naperville campus of Northern Illinois University; and the Wheaton campus of Illinois Institute of Technology.

=== School districts ===
The DuPage County Regional Office of Education provides regulatory and compliance oversight, quality services and support, and a variety of other services and information to the public schools within 42 school districts of the county that provide education to over 161,000 students in 245 schools.

The following is a list of school districts that not only includes those supported by the DuPage County Regional Office of Education, but includes others which may have schools and/or administrative headquarters outside of DuPage County but which have any territory, no matter how slight, within the county:

K-12:

- Chicago Public School District 299 - Territory at Chicago O'Hare International Airport in DuPage County boundaries
- Community Unit School District 200
- Elmhurst Community Unit School District 205
- Indian Prairie School District 204
- Lisle Community Unit School District 202
- Naperville Community Unit District 203
- School District U-46
- St. Charles Community Unit School District 303
- Westmont Community Unit School District 201

Secondary:

- Community High School District 94
- Community High School District 99
- DuPage High School District 88
- Fenton Community High School District 100
- Glenbard Township High School District 87
- Hinsdale Township High School District 86
- Lake Park Community High School District 108
- Lemont Township High School District 210

Elementary:

- Addison School District 4
- Benjamin School District 25
- Bensenville School District 2
- Bloomingdale School District 13
- Butler School District 53
- Cass School District 63
- Center Cass School District 66
- Community Consolidated School District 93
- Community Consolidated School District 180
- Darien School District 61
- Downers Grove Grade School District 58
- Glen Ellyn Community Consolidated School District 89
- Glen Ellyn School District 41
- Gower School District 62
- Hinsdale Community Consolidated School District 181
- Itasca School District 10
- Keeneyville School District 20
- Lemont-Bromberek Combined School District 113A
- Lombard School District 44
- Maercker School District 60
- Marquardt School District 15
- Medinah School District 11
- Queen Bee School District 16
- Roselle School District 12
- Salt Creek School District 48
- Villa Park School District 45
- West Chicago School District 33
- Winfield School District 34
- Wood Dale School District 7
- Woodridge School District 68

=== High schools ===
DuPage County is home to many public high schools, such as:

- Addison Trail High School
- Bartlett High School
- Downers Grove North High School
- Downers Grove South High School
- Fenton High School
- Glenbard East High School
- Glenbard North High School
- Glenbard South High School
- Glenbard West High School
- Hinsdale Central High School
- Hinsdale South High School
- Lake Park High School
- Lisle High School
- Metea Valley High School
- Naperville North High School
- Naperville Central High School
- Waubonsie Valley High School
- West Chicago Community High School
- Westmont High School
- Wheaton North High School
- Wheaton Warrenville South High School
- Willowbrook High School
- York Community High School

DuPage County is home to several private high schools, including:

- Benet Academy
- Clapham School
- College Preparatory School of America
- Driscoll Catholic High School (closed 2009)
- IC Catholic Prep
- Islamic Foundation School
- Montini Catholic High School
- St. Francis High School
- Timothy Christian School
- Wheaton Academy

== Healthcare ==
DuPage hospitals include: Central DuPage Hospital in Winfield; Edward Hospital in Naperville; Elmhurst Memorial Hospital in Elmhurst; Adventist Hinsdale Hospital in Hinsdale; Advocate Good Samaritan Hospital in Downers Grove; Adventist GlenOaks Hospital in Glendale Heights; and Marianjoy Rehabilitation Hospital in Wheaton.

== Transportation ==
=== Airports ===
A small portion of O'Hare International Airport is located inside the county, as are several small airports, including DuPage Airport.

=== Public transit ===
==== Northern Illinois Transit Authority ====
DuPage is served by a number of modes of public transit overseen by the Northern Illinois Transit Authority. Pace operates the bus system within the county. DuPage County is also well-covered by Metra, the Chicago-area commuter rail system. Three of Metra's eleven lines pass through the county: Milwaukee District West Line, Union Pacific West Line, and BNSF Line. Nineteen Metra stations are located within DuPage County.

Extending the O'Hare terminus of the Chicago "L"'s Blue Line westward to Schaumburg has been a topic of discussion for years. After planning for the Metra STAR Line nixed the initial route which went exclusively through Cook County, an option that would include two stations in DuPage County (Bensenville/ Wood Dale, as well as Itasca) became the preferred alternative. After resistance from Chicago Mayor Richard M. Daley, this plan failed to come to fruition.

In 2008, the Northern Illinois Transit Authority (then the Regional Transportation Authority) included an 13.3-mile (21.4 km) extension of a different branch of the Blue Line, from its current western terminus at Forest Park to Yorktown Center in Lombard, Illinois. Several feeder bus services would also be implemented in this plan. The prospect of this extension was also listed in the Chicago region's 2030 master plan.

==== Amtrak ====
Amtrak also serves the county at Naperville station. The Illinois Zephyr and Carl Sandburg run from Chicago to Quincy, the Southwest Chief from Chicago to Los Angeles, and the California Zephyr runs from Chicago to Emeryville, California.

=== Major highways ===
DuPage County is served by five Interstate Highways, two U.S. Highways, and nine state highways.

- I-55
- I-88 Toll / IL 110 (CKC)
- I-290
- I-294
- I-355
- US 20
- US 34
- IL 19
- IL 38
- IL 53
- IL 56
- IL 59
- IL 64
- IL 83
- IL 390

North–south roads (from west to east) include: IL 59 (Neltnor Boulevard), IL 53, I-355 (Veterans Memorial Tollway) and IL 83 (Kingery Highway). East–west roads (from south to north) include: I-55 (Stevenson Expressway) I-88 (Ronald Reagan Memorial Tollway), US 34 (Ogden Avenue), IL 56 (Butterfield Road), IL 38 (Roosevelt Road), IL 64 (North Avenue), Army Trail Road, US 20 (Lake Street), IL 19 (Irving Park Road) and IL 390 (Elgin–O'Hare Expressway), which begins at the Thorndale Avenue exit on I-290 and ends on Lake Street, in Hanover Park. I-294 partially enters DuPage County on its eastern border between Westchester, in Cook County, and Oak Brook, in DuPage County. Only the southbound lanes enter the county though. Historic U.S. Route 66 crosses through the southeast portion of the county near Darien and Willowbrook.

=== Shared-use trails ===
- Illinois Prairie Path
- Grand Illinois Trail
- Great Western Trail
- Salt Creek Trail

== Communities ==
=== Cities ===
- Aurora (part)
- Batavia (part)
- Chicago (O'Hare Airport)
- Darien
- Elmhurst (mostly)
- Naperville (mostly)
- Oakbrook Terrace
- St. Charles (part)
- Warrenville
- West Chicago
- Wheaton
- Wood Dale

=== Villages ===
- Addison
- Bartlett (mostly)
- Bensenville (mostly)
- Bloomingdale
- Bolingbrook (mostly in Will County)
- Burr Ridge (part)
- Carol Stream
- Clarendon Hills
- Downers Grove
- Elk Grove Village (part)
- Glendale Heights
- Glen Ellyn
- Hanover Park (part)
- Hinsdale (mostly)
- Itasca
- Lemont (part)
- Lisle
- Lombard
- Oak Brook (mostly)
- Roselle (mostly)
- Schaumburg (part)
- Villa Park
- Wayne (part)
- Westmont
- Willow Springs (part)
- Willowbrook
- Winfield
- Woodridge (mostly)

=== Unincorporated communities ===
- Belmont
- Butterfield
- Cloverdale
- Eola
- Flowerfield
- Fullersburg
- Keeneyville
- Lakewood
- Medinah
- North Glen Ellyn
- York Center

=== Townships ===
DuPage County has nine townships as well as part of an independent city within its boundaries, their populations at the 2010 census are:

- Downers Grove Township - 146,795
- York Township - 123,449
- Milton Township - 117,067
- Lisle Township - 116,268
- Bloomingdale Township - 111,899
- Naperville Township - 100,019
- Addison Township - 88,612
- Wayne Township - 66,582
- Winfield Township - 46,233
- City of Chicago - DuPage side is nonresidential

=== Ghost towns/Neighborhoods ===
- Gostyn
- Ontarioville
- Tedens
- Weston

== See also ==
- List of counties in Illinois
- List of Illinois townships
