= Ellyn =

Ellyn is a given name. Notable people with the name include:

- Ellyn Setnor Bogdanoff (born 1959), Representative in the House of Representatives of the U.S. state of Florida
- Ellyn Stern, professional actress, voice actress, and director in California
- Ellyn Toscano, arts administrator, curator and author

== See also ==
- Glen Ellyn, Illinois, affluent village in DuPage County, Illinois, United States
  - Glen Ellyn (Metra), station on Metra's Union Pacific/West Line
  - Glen Ellyn Main Street Historic District, set of eleven buildings
  - Village Links of Glen Ellyn, public golf course
