= Downers Grove Township, Illinois =

Downers Grove Township
- Township
- Location in DuPage County

- DuPage County's location in Illinois
- Coordinates: 41°45′15″N 87°58′32″W
- Country: United States
- State: Illinois
- County: DuPage
- Established: November 6, 1849

Government
  - Supervisor: Kim Savage

Area
  - Total: 50.97 sq mi (132.0 km^{2})
  - Land: 49.66 sq mi (128.6 km^{2})
  - Water: 1.32 sq mi (3.4 km^{2}) 2.59%
- Elevation: 750 ft (230 m)

Population (2020)
  - Total: 149,921
  - Density: 3,019/sq mi (1,166/km^{2})
- Time zone: UTC-6 (CST)
  - Summer (DST): UTC-5 (CDT)
- ZIP codes: 60439, 60480, 60514–60517, 60521, 60523, 60527, 60559, 60561
- FIPS code: 17-043-20604
- Website: Downers Grove Township

Downers Grove Township is one of nine townships in DuPage County, Illinois, United States. As of the 2020 census, its population was 149,921, and it contained 61,933 housing units. It is among the largest townships in DuPage County by both area and population.

== Geography ==
According to the 2021 census gazetteer files, Downers Grove Township has a total area of 50.97 square miles (132.01 km^{2}), of which 49.66 square miles (128.62 km^{2}) (97.41%) is land and 1.32 square miles (3.42 km^{2}) (2.59%) is water.

=== Cities, towns, and villages ===
- Bolingbrook (small portion)
- Burr Ridge (partial)
- Clarendon Hills
- Darien
- Downers Grove (mostly)
- Hinsdale (mostly)
- Lemont (partial)
- Oak Brook (small portion)
- Westmont (mostly)
- Willow Springs (small portion)
- Willowbrook
- Woodridge (partial)

=== Unincorporated communities ===
- Fullersburg at 41.818087°N 87.918394°W
- Lace at 41.751975°N 87.967560°W

(This list is based on USGS data and may include former settlements.)

=== Ghost towns ===
- Gostyn at 41.795556°N 87.994444°W
- Tedens at 41.694476°N 87.972837°W

=== Landmarks ===
- Argonne National Laboratory (northeast corner of the township)
- Waterfall Glen Forest Preserve

== Transportation ==
=== Major highways ===
- Interstate 55
- Interstate 88
- Interstate 355
- U.S. Route 34
- Historic U.S. Route 66
- Illinois Route 83

=== Airports and heliports ===
- Brookeridge Airpark (LL22) — residential airpark in the township
- Argonne Heliport
- Darien–Woodridge Fire Department Heliport
- Madison Avenue Venture Heliport
- Midwest Heliport

== Natural features ==
- Des Plaines River
- Brookeridge Lake
- Bruce Lake
- Darien Lake
- Golfview Lake
- Hidden Lake
- Lake Charles
- Lake Hinsdale
- Maple Lake
- Picadilly Lake
- Ruth Lake
- Timber Lake
- Twin Lakes
- Waterfall Glen Lake

== Cemeteries ==
Downers Grove Township maintains and oversees several cemeteries, including Cass, Clarendon Hills, Downers Grove, Fullersburg, Hinsdale Animal, Oak Crest, Oak Hill, Pierce Downer, Saint John’s Lutheran, Saint Mary of Gostyn, Saint Patrick’s Catholic, and Zion Lutheran.

== Demographics ==
As of the 2020 census there were 149,921 people, 57,993 households, and 40,301 families residing in the township. The population density was 2,941.13 inhabitants per square mile (1,135.58/km^{2}). There were 61,933 housing units at an average density of 1,214.99 per square mile (469.11/km^{2}).

The racial makeup of the township was 74.61% White, 4.55% African American, 0.27% Native American, 10.87% Asian, 0.05% Pacific Islander, 2.65% from other races, and 7.00% from two or more races. Hispanic or Latino of any race were 8.32% of the population.

There were 57,993 households, of which 31.20% had children under 18, 57.96% were married couples living together, 7.79% had a female householder with no spouse present, and 30.51% were non-families. 26.70% of all households were individuals, and 12.60% had someone living alone aged 65 or older. The average household size was 2.53, and the average family size was 3.10.

The median age was 43.5 years. The median household income was $98,914, and the median family income was $128,804. The per capita income was $58,647. About 4.2% of families and 5.9% of the population were below the poverty line.

Historical population
Census	Pop.	Note	%±
1960	66,664		—
1970	94,268		41.4%
1980	122,865		30.3%
1990	137,862		12.2%
2000	148,110		7.4%
2010	146,795		−0.9%
2020	149,921		2.1%
U.S. Decennial Census

== Education ==
- Butler School District 53
- Cass School District 63
- Center Cass School District 66
- Darien School District 61
- Downers Grove Grade School District 58
- Gower School District 62
- Hinsdale School District 181
- Lemont–Bromberek Combined School District 113A
- Maercker School District 60
- Woodridge School District 68
- Community High School District 99
- Hinsdale Township High School District 86
- Lemont Township High School District 210
- Westmont Community Unit School District 201

== Government ==
Downers Grove Township was established on November 6, 1849. It is named for Pierce Downer, one of the area’s early settlers. The township seat is located in Downers Grove. The township provides general assistance, property assessment, and road maintenance for unincorporated areas.

=== Township elected officials ===
- Supervisor, Kim Savage (D)
- Assessor, Gregory A. Boltz (R)
- Clerk, Mandy Roudebush (D)
- Highway Commissioner, Tom Chlystek (I)
- Township Trustees
  - Kevin Szczerba (D)
  - Michelle Moreno (D)
  - Karol Sole (D)
  - Richard Friel (D)

=== Political districts ===
- Illinois's 6th congressional district
- Illinois's 11th congressional district
- State House Districts: 45, 81, 82
- State Senate Districts: 23, 41

== See also ==
- DuPage County, Illinois
- List of townships in Illinois
