= Wayne Township, Illinois =

Wayne Township
- Township
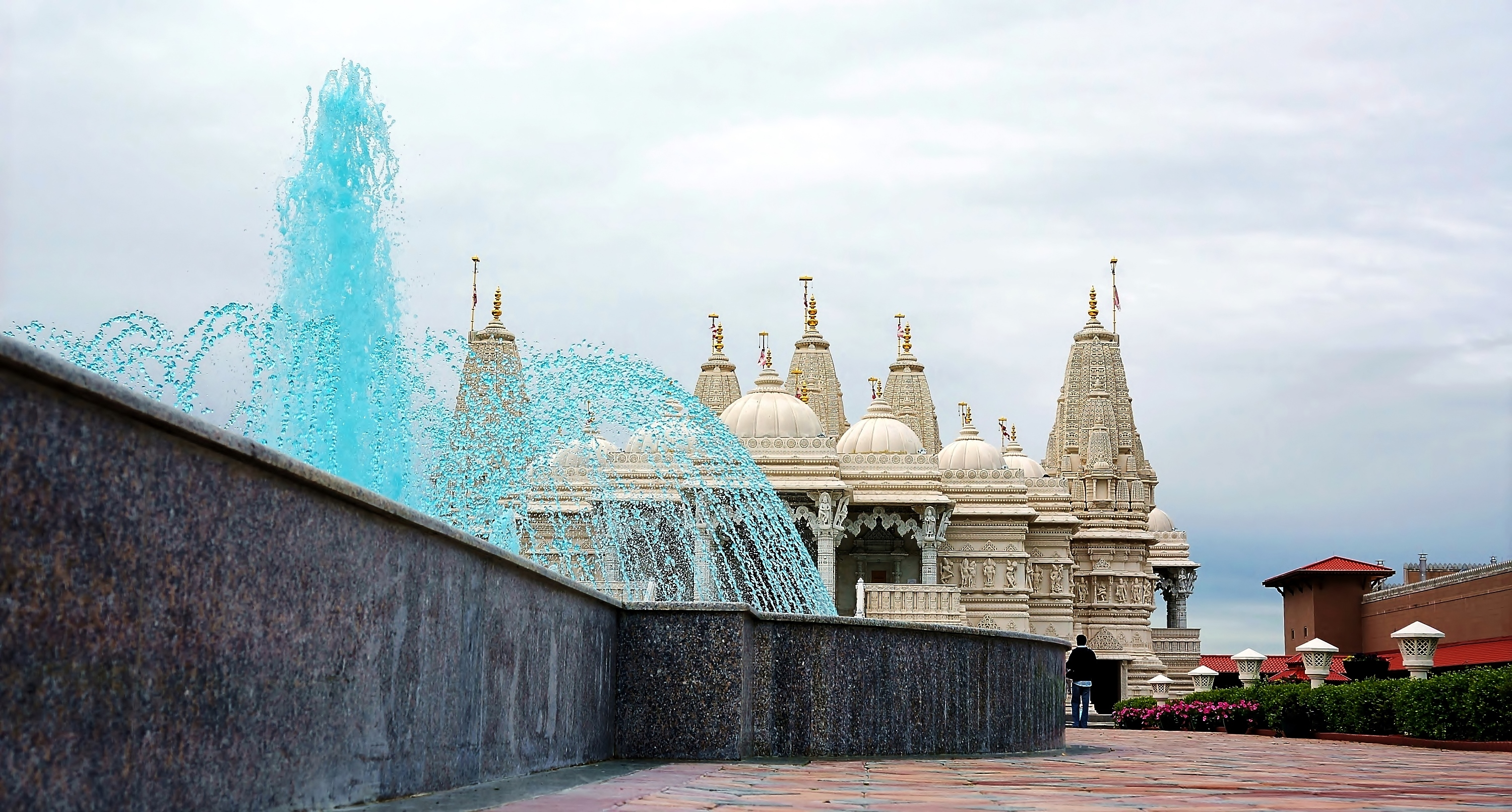
- Temple in Wayne Township

- Flag Seal

- Location in DuPage County

- DuPage County's location in Illinois
- Coordinates: 41°56′46″N 88°12′01″W
- Country: United States
- State: Illinois
- County: DuPage
- Settled: November 6, 1849

Government
  - Type: Illinois Township
  - Supervisor: Randy Ramey

Area
  - Total: 36.43 sq mi (94.4 km^{2})
  - Land: 35.41 sq mi (91.7 km^{2})
  - Water: 1.02 sq mi (2.6 km^{2}) 2.81%
- Elevation: 771 ft (235 m)

Population (2020)
  - Total: 64,427
  - Density: 1,819/sq mi (702.5/km^{2})
- Time zone: UTC-6 (CST)
  - Summer (DST): UTC-5 (CDT)
- ZIP codes: 60103, 60133, 60174, 60184, 60185, 60188
- FIPS code: 17-043-79410
- Website: waynetwp-il.org

Wayne Township is one of nine townships in DuPage County, Illinois, United States. As of the 2020 census, its population was 64,427 and it contained 21,788 housing units.

== Geography ==
According to the 2021 census gazetteer files, Wayne Township has a total area of 36.43 square miles (94.35 km^{2}), of which 35.41 square miles (91.71 km^{2}) (97.19%) is land and 1.02 square miles (2.64 km^{2}) (2.81%) is water.

=== Cities, towns, villages ===
- Bartlett (partial)
- Carol Stream (west quarter)
- Hanover Park (partial)
- St. Charles (partial)
- Wayne (partial)
- West Chicago (partial)

=== Unincorporated towns ===
- Granger at 41.955573°N 88.184333°W
- Ingalton at 41.906139°N 88.203684°W
- Lakewood at 41.916695°N 88.197573°W
- Prince Crossing at 41.905028°N 88.184516°W
- Schick at 41.951695°N 88.164239°W
- Wayne Centerat 41.942806°N 88.173684°W

(This list is based on USGS data and may include former settlements.)

=== Ghost town ===
- Ontarioville at 41.987528°N 88.150073°W

=== Adjoining townships ===
- Hanover Township, Cook County (north)
- Schaumburg Township, Cook County (northeast)
- Bloomingdale Township (east)
- Milton Township (southeast)
- Winfield Township (south)
- Geneva Township, Kane County (southwest)
- St. Charles Township, Kane County (west)
- Elgin Township, Kane County (northwest)

=== Cemeteries ===
The township contains these three cemeteries: Illinois Pet, Ontarioville, and Wayne Township.

=== Major highways ===
- U.S. Route 20
- Illinois Route 59
- Illinois Route 64

=== Airports and landing strips ===
- DuPage Airport
- Van Kampen Heliport

=== Lakes ===
- Bass Lake
- Deep Quarry Lake
- Harrier Lake
- Heritage Lake
- Island Lake (partial)
- Pickerel Lake

=== Landmarks ===
- DuPage Airport (north quarter)
- Pratt Wayne Woods Forest Preserve
- West Branch Forest Preserve

== Demographics ==
Historical population
Census	Pop.	Note	%±
1930	1,166		—
1940	1,274		9.3%
1950	2,065		62.1%
1960	3,077		49.0%
1970	5,492		78.5%
1980	23,246		323.3%
1990	40,379		73.7%
2000	63,776		57.9%
2010	66,582		4.4%
2020	64,427		−3.2%
U.S. Decennial Census

As of the 2020 census, there were 64,427 people, 21,808 households, and 17,925 families residing in the township. The population density was 1,768.56 inhabitants per square mile (682.84/km^{2}). There were 21,788 housing units at an average density of 598.09 per square mile (230.92/km^{2}). The racial makeup of the township was 63.31% White, 3.05% African American, 0.46% Native American, 18.25% Asian, 0.03% Pacific Islander, 6.42% from other races, and 8.48% from two or more races. Hispanic or Latino of any race were 14.75% of the population.

== Township government ==
The township government consists of a Supervisor, four Trustees, a Clerk, an Assessor, and a Highway Commissioner, all elected to four-year terms by the voters at large.

Office	Name	Municipality
Supervisor	Randy Ramey	Carol Stream
Trustee	Paige Parent	Bartlett
Trustee	Angela Campobasso	Bartlett
Trustee	Michelle Bowen	Bartlett
Trustee	Christianne Lewis	Bartlett
Clerk	Brandi Fike Ramundo	West Chicago
Assessor	Michael Musson	Bartlett
Highway Commissioner	Martin McManamon	Bartlett

== Education ==
- Community Unit School District 25
- Community Consolidated School District 93
- Community Unit School District 303
- Community High School District 94
- Glenbard Township High School District 87

== Political districts ==
- Illinois's 6th congressional district
- Illinois's 14th congressional district
- State House District 55
- State House District 56
- State Senate District 23
- State Senate District 28
