= Gostyn, Illinois =

- Neighborhood
- Location within Illinois
- Coordinates: 41°47′44″N 87°59′40″W
- Country: United States
- State: Illinois
- County: DuPage
- Township: Downers Grove
- Time zone: UTC-6 (Central (CST))
  - Summer (DST): UTC-5 (CDT)
- ZIP code: 60515
- Area codes: 630 & 331

Gostyn (/ˌɡɒstɪn/ GOS-tin) is a community within the village of Downers Grove in DuPage County, Illinois, United States. It is located along Fairview Avenue near Westmont. According to an 1889 directory, the community was predominantly of Polish descent, with 575 residents. It was one of the first eastern European communities in Illinois. It takes its name from the city of Gostyń, Poland.

The community is still very well-known. There are several single family homes in the area, as well as several apartment complexes and businesses, which bear the suffix "of Gostyn". Although the community never incorporated and is now part of Downers Grove, there is a small business district located along Fairview Avenue, near the junction of the BNSF Railroad Line and the Fairview Avenue Station. Among the businesses there are: a gas station, a law firm, a guitar shop, an insurance office, a nail salon, a 7-Eleven convenience store, a pizzeria, and a laundromat. The local church, Saint Mary of Gostyn, built in 1891, also bears the town's name.
