= Flowerfield, Illinois =

- Unincorporated community
- Location within Illinois Location within the United States
- Coordinates: 41°52′02″N 88°02′02″W
- Country: United States
- State: Illinois
- County: DuPage
- Township: Milton
- Elevation: 696 ft (212 m)
- Time zone: UTC-6 (Central (CST))
  - Summer (DST): UTC-5 (CDT)
- ZIP code: 60148 (Lombard)
- Area codes: 630 & 331
- GNIS feature ID: 421804

Flowerfield is an unincorporated community in Milton Township, DuPage County, Illinois, United States. Flowerfield is located near Illinois Route 53 and Wilson Avenue, between Glen Ellyn and Lombard.
