= Tedens, Illinois =

- Former community
- Location within Illinois Location within the United States
- Coordinates: 41°41′40″N 87°58′22″W
- Country: United States
- State: Illinois
- County: DuPage
- Elevation: 594 ft (181 m)
- Time zone: UTC-6 (Central (CST))
  - Summer (DST): UTC-5 (CDT)
- GNIS feature ID: 2044162

Tedens is a ghost town in Downers Grove Township, DuPage County, Illinois, United States.
