= Butterfield, Illinois =

Unincorporated community in Illinois

- Unincorporated community
- Location within Illinois Location within the United States
- Coordinates: 41°50′11″N 88°02′31″W
- Country: United States
- State: Illinois
- County: DuPage
- Township: Milton, York
- Elevation: 682 ft (208 m)

Population
  - Total: 4,636
- Time zone: UTC-6 (Central (CST))
  - Summer (DST): UTC-5 (CDT)
- ZIP code: 60148 (Lombard)
- Area codes: 630 & 331
- GNIS feature ID: 1771694

Butterfield is an unincorporated community spanning Milton Township and York Township, DuPage County, Illinois, United States. Butterfield is located north of Butterfield Road, west of Finley Road, south (and just north) of 22nd Street, and east of the East Branch of the DuPage River. It is nestled in between the communities of Glen Ellyn, Downers Grove, and Lombard.

The Butterfield subdivision was founded in 1961 by F&S Construction Co. (later known as the Hoffman Rosner Corp., the same company that built Hoffman Estates). Originally named “Beautiful Butterfield”, the subdivision was later informally renamed “Butterfield East” due to the creation in 1965 of the “Butterfield West” neighborhood in the eastern edge of Glen Ellyn. However, it is usually just referred to as “Butterfield”.

Butterfield contains 841 homes, and has approximately 4,636 residents, based on the 2010 Census. Children attend District 44 for grade school, and District 87 for high school. Postal service is provided by the Lombard Post Office, police service is provided by the DuPage County Sheriff's Office, and fire service is provided by contract with the Lombard Fire Department. Water and sewer services are supplied by the Illinois American Water Company, who purchase Lake Michigan water from the DuPage Water Commission.

As an unincorporated subdivision, Butterfield falls under DuPage County jurisdiction, but its roads, sidewalks and parkways (that part of the lawn between the sidewalk and the street) are managed by the townships. This includes snow plowing, managing trees in the parkway, and brush pickup.

Being unincorporated, Butterfield has no governmental structure, so the Butterfield Homeowners Administration serves as the “voice of the community” and as liaison to local government.
