= Lakewood, DuPage County, Illinois =

Lakewood, Illinois
- Unincorporated community
- Location within Illinois Location within the United States
- Coordinates: 41°55′00″N 88°11′51″W
- Country: United States
- State: Illinois
- County: DuPage
- Township: Wayne
- Elevation: 784 ft (239 m)
- Time zone: UTC-6 (Central (CST))
  - Summer (DST): UTC-5 (CDT)
- Zip: 60186
- Area code: 630
- GNIS feature ID: 421895

Lakewood is an unincorporated community in Wayne Township, DuPage County, Illinois, United States. Lakewood is located at the northeastern border of West Chicago.
