= Keeneyville, Illinois =

- Unincorporated community
- Location within Illinois
- Coordinates: 41°58′03″N 88°07′13″W
- Country: United States
- State: Illinois
- County: DuPage
- Township: Bloomingdale
- Elevation: 771 ft (235 m)
- Time zone: UTC−6 (Central (CST))
  - Summer (DST): UTC−5 (CDT)
- ZIP code: 60172
- Area code(s): 630 & 331
- GNIS feature ID: 421881

Keeneyville is an unincorporated community in DuPage County, Illinois, United States. Keeneyville is located in Bloomingdale Township, along the southern borders of Hanover Park and Roselle on Gary Avenue, just south of Lake Street (U.S. Route 20).

Keeneyville is named after Albert Keeney, an early settler and pioneer developer.

Keeneyville School District 20 is the area elementary school district.

In 1986, the Chicago Bears took an option on a parcel of land in Keeneyville as a potential site for a new stadium. The team ultimately chose to remain in Soldier Field.
