= North Glen Ellyn, Illinois =

- Unincorporated community
- Location within Illinois Location within the United States
- Coordinates: 41°53′31″N 88°03′47″W
- Country: United States
- State: Illinois
- County: DuPage
- Elevation: 738 ft (225 m)
- Time zone: UTC-6 (Central (CST))
  - Summer (DST): UTC-5 (CDT)
- Area codes: 630 & 331
- GNIS feature ID: 421964

North Glen Ellyn is an unincorporated community in Milton Township, DuPage County, Illinois, United States.
