= Westmont High School (Westmont, Illinois) =

Public school in DuPage County, Illinois, U.S.

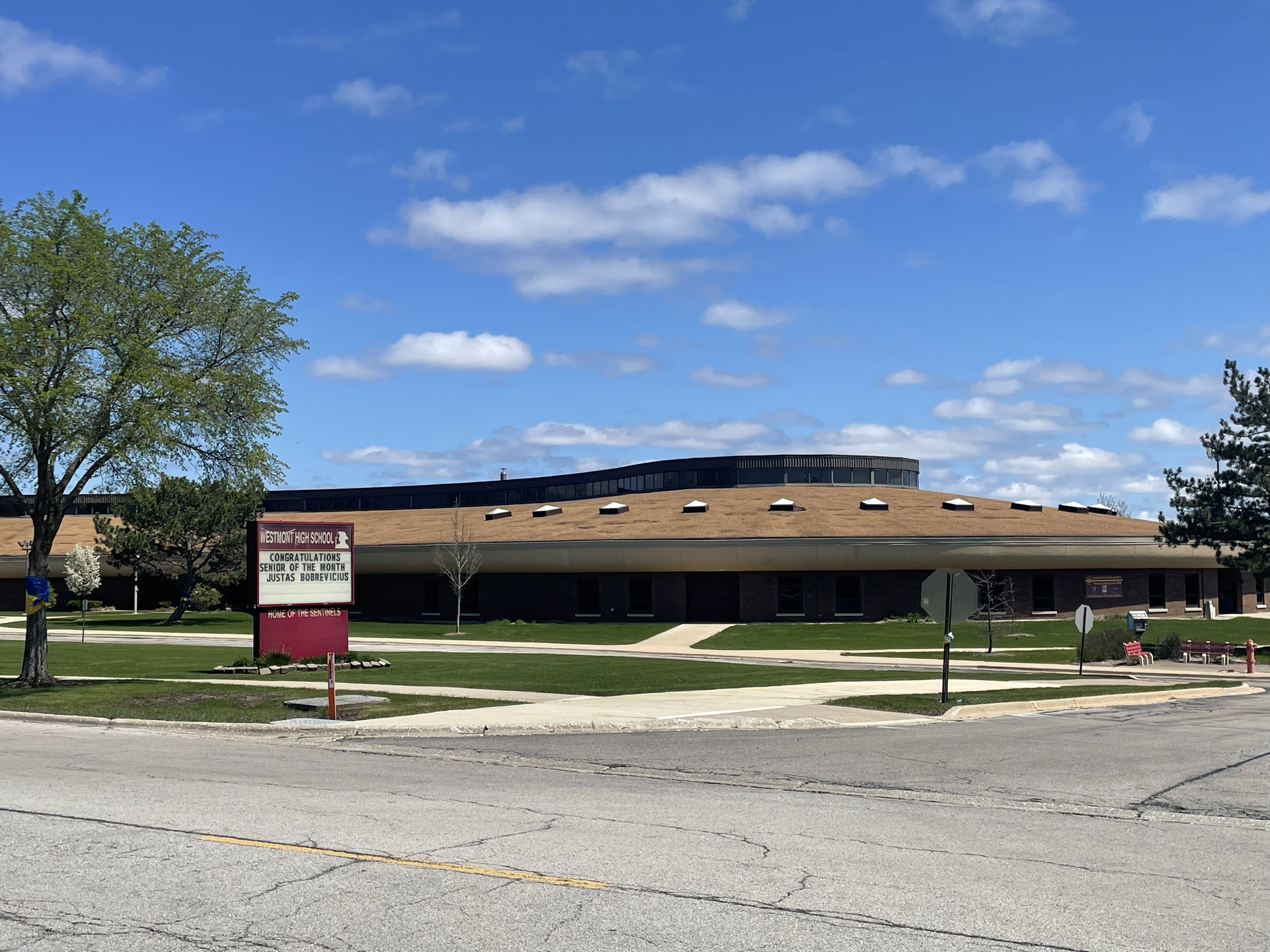
- Westmont High School in 2025

Location
- 909 N. Oakwood Dr. Westmont, DuPage County, Illinois 60559; United States; 41.81898°N 87.96247°W

Information
- Type: Public secondary
- Motto: Where Choices Become Opportunities
- Established: 1972 (building 1976)
- School district: Westmont Community Unit School District 201
- Dean: Adam Kordalewski
- Administrator: Mary Kassir
- Principal: Kevin Weck
- Teaching staff: 34.30 (FTE)
- Grades: 9–12
- Gender: co-ed
- Enrollment: 378 (2024-25)
- Student to teacher ratio: 11.46
- Campus: Suburban
- Colors: Burgundy; Gold
- Athletics conference: Chicago Prep Conference
- Mascot: Sentinel
- Nickname: Sentinels
- Website: cusd201.org/whs/

Westmont High School, or WHS, is a public four-year high school located in Westmont, a western suburb of Chicago, Illinois, in the United States. It is part of Westmont Community Unit School District 201. The student population of 393 (2018–2019) and building size are much smaller than adjacent public high schools such as Downers Grove North and Hinsdale Central.

== History ==
The school was created as part of the newly formed CUSD 201 in Westmont in 1972, and first opened for education in September 1974.

The community approved building the new high school in 1973, and the current Westmont High School building opened in October 1976. The school mascot, the Sentinel, is a sentry, or guard wearing a uniform of the school colors, burgundy and gold. The name was chosen via submissions to the school board. Sentinels represents the fact that Westmont was the highest point in the Chicago area, and hence a position a Sentinel would take.

== Administration ==
Westmont High School is part of the Community Unit School District 201.

== Demographics ==
In 2025, Westmont High School enrolled 378 students, 50% of whom were White, 6.1% of whom were Black, 31.2% of whom were Hispanic, and 6.9% were Asian/Pacific Islander. Low-income students comprised 37.8% of the student body; 11.6% were English learners. The attendance rate was 94.5%.

== Academics ==
In 2010, Westmont had an average composite ACT score of 21.4, and graduated 89.9% of its senior class. The average class size is 22.5. Westmont has made Adequate Yearly Progress on the Prairie State Achievement Examination, a state test part of the No Child Left Behind Act.

== Athletics ==
Westmont competes in the Metro Suburban Conference and Illinois High School Association. Its mascot is the Sentinel.

In 2021, the Westmont High School scholastic bowl team won both the NAQT Traditional Public Small School National Championship and Very Small School National Championship. The team consisted of Pranav Viswanath, Akshar Goyal, Lily Sakalys, Mark Michalik, Michael Smith, Stephen Michalik, Omer Mohsin, and Diana Zheng. The team was coached by head coach Tom DeMay and assistant coaches Nathan Chamberlain and Margaret Scheidel.

== Notable alumni ==
- Pierre Pierce – Former Iowa Hawkeyes Basketball Player
- Joe Getty of Armstrong and Getty – Radio Talk Show Host
- Reggie Benjamin – Musician, record label owner
