= Ebenezer Floppen Slopper's Wonderful Water Slides =

Waterpark in Oakbrook Terrace, Illinois

Coordinates: 41.863119°N 87.961698°W

Ebenezer Floppen Slopper's Wonderful Water Slides is an abandoned waterpark located on a hill near the intersection of Illinois Route 38 (Roosevelt Road) and Route 83 in Oakbrook Terrace, Illinois.

== Site history ==
The site opened in 1951 as a gravel pit and landfill under a local businessman named Clayburn Robinette, operating until the late 1970s. By the 1960s the site was known as "Mt Trashmore".

When the landfill reached ground level, it was covered with concrete, brick and an eight-foot clay cap. The site was a large hill that became overgrown. Mark Collor was driving past the site and took interest due to the potential for water slides.

"Try to find a hill in Chicago, it's a little hard," Collor told the Chicago Tribune in 2009. "My friend and I saw that hill with that sign on top of it for The Flame restaurant, and I said, 'There's a hill!'"

Collor signed an agreement with the Robinette family to build two water slides and a few small buildings on the property.

The park's tongue-twister name came about because Collor had been amused by a story his brother-in-law had told about meeting a man in Joplin, Missouri, named Ebenezer Floppen.

== Operation history ==
When the park first opened on July 5, 1980, it had only two simple, 800-foot concrete water slides. People slid down on rubber mats in groups of up to eight at a time. The mats were colour-coded to manage the flow of crowds through the slides: for instance, patrons carrying red mats entered the slides at noon and came out at 12:30, while those with blue mats entered at 12:30 and left at 1pm.

The water park had paid for its installation costs by 5 August 1980, and became a major summer attraction for residents of surrounding towns and communities as people lined up for rides down the large winding slides. After two years, Collor sold the park to a businessman he knew from Oak Park and River Forest High School.

During the 1980s, the park added five additional slides. The new slides included: two flat racer slides in which people slid down head-first on folded rubber mats; two semi-enclosed tube body slides; and a smaller slide in which patrons rode inner tubes into a nearby wading pool.

The slides were also unique in that they were lined with a blue rubber foam material which would prevent injuries from contacts with the slide walls. Due to the design of the two main large concrete slides, especially with the V-shaped configuration of their side walls, people could also slide quite high up the walls of the slides, especially when hitting a turn at high speeds.

Around 1987, the large concrete slides were resurfaced with flat bottoms with humps and bumps. Patrons rode the slides solo on inner tubes, getting bumped up and down and sideways as they went down the renovated slides. To fit the new rides, the park was renamed "Doc River's Roaring Rapids Water Park."

== Closure and rumors ==
The park closed for good at the end of the 1989 season for undisclosed reasons. Neglected and abandoned since, the slides and wading pool have fallen into ruin. The site has become popular with urban explorers, and the mystery surrounding its closure has given rise to online speculation that park patrons had been injured or killed.

== As a ruin ==
The site is still owned by the Robinette family, which operates a nearby demolition business. There are security cameras, signs warning against trespassing, a roadblock on a road that leads to the park, and a permanent chain-link fence has been erected around the site. None of this has deterred curious explorers.

By July 2009, the two large concrete slides had numerous cracks and splits in the concrete that had sprouted saplings six to eight feet tall. At that time, the rubber foam lining had peeled off the slide walls and lay jumbled in the slides, the slide walls were covered with graffiti, and the slides were also filled with tree branches and dirt, especially about 150 feet above the plunge pool, where a retaining wall had recently collapsed and filled one of the slides to its rim with dirt and weeds. Both racers were cracked and peeled badly: surfacing was missing in a few spots filled with more weeds and overgrowth, the body slides were choked with leaves and branches, the smaller inner tube slide had numerous saplings sprouting from its base and was also badly split and cracked, and the wading pool was also cracked and full of weeds. Other retaining walls elsewhere in the park that once held elevated gardens continued to sag severely in July 2009. As of April 2019, the only remnants of the water park that can be seen from Route 83 are some lights that illuminated the water park. A big red billboard that says “Advertise Here” can be seen at the top the hill.
