= Milton Township, Illinois =

Milton Township
- Township
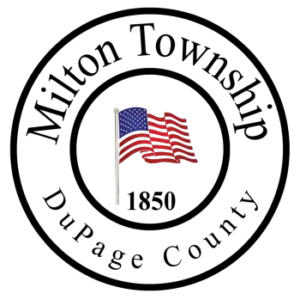
- Seal

- Location in DuPage County

- DuPage County's location in Illinois
- Coordinates: 41°51′31″N 88°05′22″W
- Country: United States
- State: Illinois
- County: DuPage
- Established: November 6, 1849

Government
  - Type: Illinois township
  - Supervisor: Elizabeth Higgins-Beard
  - Assessor: Chris E. LeVan

Area
  - Total: 35.30 sq mi (91.4 km^{2})
  - Land: 34.43 sq mi (89.2 km^{2})
  - Water: 0.87 sq mi (2.3 km^{2}) 2.45%
- Elevation: 771 ft (235 m)

Population (2020)
  - Total: 120,237
  - Density: 3,492/sq mi (1,348/km^{2})
- Time zone: UTC-6 (CST)
  - Summer (DST): UTC-5 (CDT)
- ZIP codes: 60137, 60139, 60148, 60187, 60188, 60189, 60190, 60515, 60563
- Area codes: 630, 331
- FIPS code: 17-043-49451
- Website: Milton Township

Milton Township is one of nine civil townships in DuPage County, Illinois, United States. As of the 2020 census, its population was 120,237 and it contained 46,254 housing units.

== Geography ==
According to the 2021 census gazetteer files, Milton Township has a total area of 35.30 square miles (91.43 km^{2}), of which 34.43 square miles (89.17 km^{2}) (97.55%) is land and 0.87 square miles (2.25 km^{2}) (2.45%) is water.

=== Cities, towns, and villages ===
- Carol Stream (southeast quarter)
- Downers Grove (northwest quarter)
- Glen Ellyn
- Glendale Heights (partial)
- Lisle (north quarter)
- Lombard (west quarter)
- Naperville (small portion)
- Wheaton (mostly)
- Winfield (east quarter)

=== Unincorporated communities ===
- Arboretum Estates at 41.834474°N 88.066177°W
- Butterfield at 41.8364187°N 88.0420097°W (partially in York Township)
- Danada Farms at 41.828838°N 88.105376°W
- Flowerfield at 41.867252°N 88.033955°W
- Foxcroft at 41.836141°N 88.075344°W
- Gretna at 41.898085°N 88.101458°W
- Jewell Road at 41.876696°N 88.135903°W
- North Glen Ellyn at 41.891974°N 88.063123°W
- Saddlewood at 41.892251°N 88.075901°W
- Valley View at 41.830308°N 88.067844°W

(This list is based on USGS data and may include former settlements.)

=== Landmarks ===
- Danada Forest Preserve
- Hidden Lake Forest Preserve
- Willowbrook Wildlife Center
- Morton Arboretum (partial)

== Transportation ==
=== Major highways ===
- Interstate 355
- Illinois Route 38
- Illinois Route 53
- Illinois Route 56
- Illinois Route 64

== Demographics ==
As of the 2020 census, there were 120,237 people, 43,088 households, and 30,683 families residing in the township. The population density was 3,406.44 inhabitants per square mile (1,315.23/km^{2}). There were 46,254 housing units at an average density of 1,310.42 per square mile (505.96/km^{2}).

The racial makeup of the township was 74.23% White, 4.75% African American, 0.31% Native American, 9.66% Asian, 0.02% Pacific Islander, 3.70% from other races, and 7.33% from two or more races. Hispanic or Latino of any race were 9.14% of the population.

The median household income was $103,462, and the median family income was $129,841. The per capita income was $52,520. About 3.3% of families and 5.3% of the population were below the poverty line, including 5.1% of those under age 18 and 5.0% of those age 65 or over.

Historical population
Census	Pop.	Note	%±
1930	17,113		—
1940	16,824		−1.7%
1950	25,604		52.2%
1960	51,361		100.6%
1970	75,872		47.7%
1980	97,167		28.1%
1990	108,148		11.3%
2000	118,616		9.7%
2010	117,067		−1.3%
2020	120,237		2.7%
U.S. Decennial Census

== Education ==
- College of DuPage
- Wheaton College (Illinois)
- Community Consolidated School District 89
- Community Unit School District 200
- Glen Ellyn School District 41
- Glenbard Township High School District 87

== Political districts ==
- Illinois's 6th congressional district
- State House Districts 42, 45, 48, 95
- State Senate Districts 21, 23, 24, 48
