= Village Links of Glen Ellyn =

Golf course in Glen Ellyn, Illinois, US

Coordinates: 41°51′14″N 88°04′21″W

The Village Links of Glen Ellyn is a public golf course located in Glen Ellyn, Illinois, a suburb of Chicago.

Founded in 1967, it was the first publicly owned 18-hole golf course in DuPage County, Illinois. It has long been recognized as one of the top golf courses in the Chicago area. It was the host course for the PGA Tour's Western Open General Qualifying virtually every year from 1980 through 2006. It has hosted other high level golf events including the 1986 Illinois Open and multiple State Match Play Championships. It has hosted the 36-hole U.S. Open Sectional Qualifying five times (1985, 1991, 1995, 2005 and 2012). In 2005 it was the only golf course in the United States to host both a PGA Tour event qualifying and a U.S. Open Sectional Qualifying in the same season.

The Village Links of Glen Ellyn has long been one of the leading golf courses in the United States in promoting environmental friendly management. It was the first public golf course in the world to become fully certified as a Wildlife Sanctuary by Audubon International. Golf Course Superintendent Timothy Kelly was recognized as the National Public Golf Course Environmental Steward of the Year three consecutive years in the 1990s.

The Village Links of Glen Ellyn was one of the first golf courses to develop and implement a pace of play program. Its KEEP PACE program, created in 1979, is arguably the most successful program of its kind and has been adopted by hundreds of courses nationwide in some form or another. KEEP PACE encourages golfers to maintain their position with the group ahead, while traditional efforts focused on not slowing down the golfers in the group behind.

The Village Links of Glen Ellyn has both a 9-hole course and an 18-hole course. The 18-hole course was extensively renovated in 2004. The golf course architect for that renovation, Garrett Gill of River Falls, Wisconsin, is the son of the Village Links original architect David Gill of St. Charles, Illinois.

In 2013 the golf course clubhouse was expanded and a new restaurant and bar, Reserve 22, opened. Reserve 22 features a full-service restaurant and bar, and a 150-seat banquet facility.
