= Glen Ellyn Main Street Historic District =

Historic district in Illinois, United States

- U.S. National Register of Historic Places
- U.S. Historic district
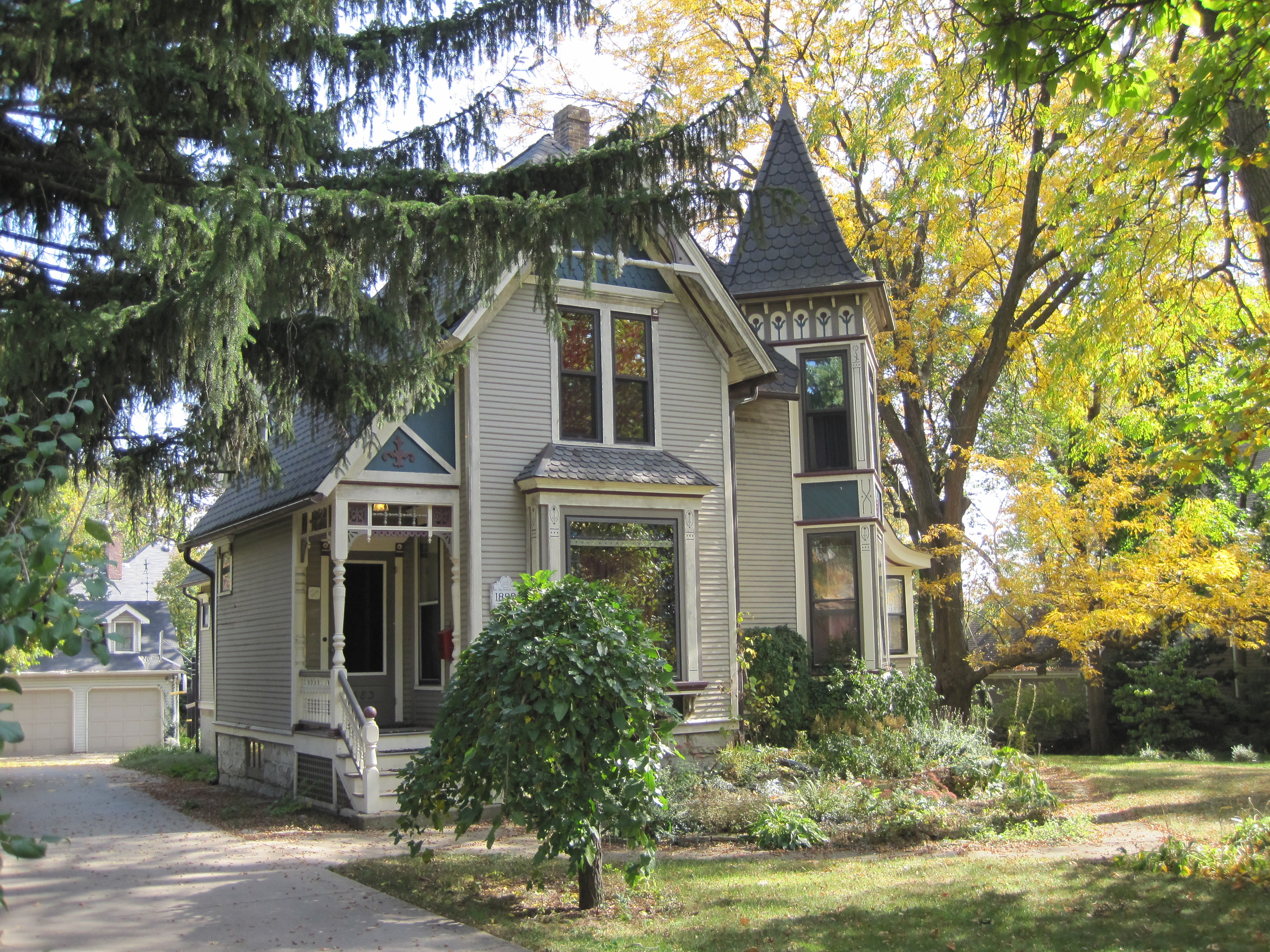
- The Whittle–Meacham House House at 583 N. Main St

- Location within Illinois Location within the United States
- Location: Main St. between Cottage Ave. and Hawthorne St. Glen Ellyn, DuPage County, Illinois, U.S.
- Coordinates: 41°52′49″N 88°4′0″W
- Built: 1874-1890
- Architectural style: Queen Anne, Italianate, Gothic Revival
- NRHP reference No.: 84000204
- Added to NRHP: October 29, 1984

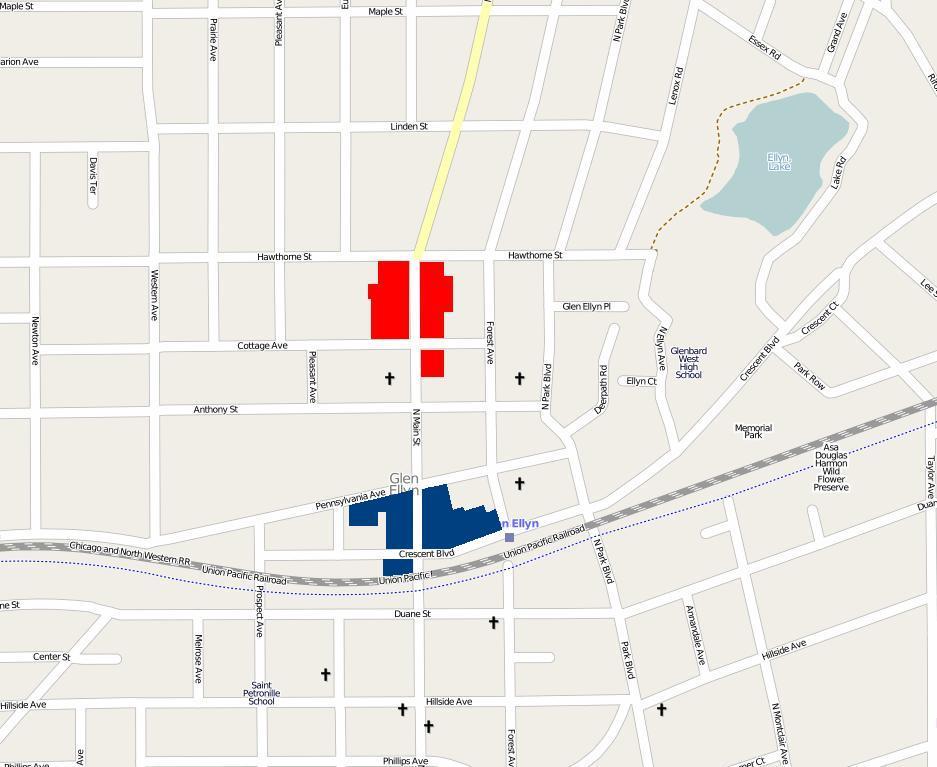
Location of Main Street Historic District (red) within Glen Ellyn

The Glen Ellyn Main Street Historic District is a set of eleven buildings in Glen Ellyn, Illinois. The houses were built between 1874 and 1890 when the village was known as Prospect Park. The swampy setting of the village began to gain a reputation as a retreat away from the city, and by 1882 the village was large enough for incorporation. Wealthy businessmen built homes along the main stretch of the village in what would become the historical district. In the mid-1880s, a river was dammed, creating Lake Glen Ellyn, spurring the new name for the village.

== Buildings ==
=== Significant structures ===
These buildings are of particular historical or architectural interest. These residents were owned by early settlers and still resemble the original building.

- Benjamin Gault House (1890) - Gault was an ornithologist known locally as "the bird man". He was a member of the National Geographic Society and National Audubon Society, and the secretary of the Wilson Ornithological Society. His articles appeared in The Auk and the Smithsonian Institution. The home was formerly the site of the first school in the village.
- Edgar H. McChesney House (1885) - Queen Anne style residence. McChesney opened a grocery store with his brother in 1878. He sold his business and was later postmaster and village president. The house features an iron gate and a horse barn.
- Nelson P. Dodge House (1882) - Italianate style residence. Dodge was a carpenter and the son of an early settler to the region.
- Henry Fennamore House (1874) - Gothic Revival style residence. A private kindergarten was taught in the residence in the 1920s.
- Whittle–Meacham House (1889) - Queen Anne style. The original owner, Civil War veteran James F. Whittle, sold the house to George Meacham in 1899 when he retired to Alabama. Meacham was related to the Meacham family that originally settled in Bloomingdale.
- John Newton Nind House (1876) - Italianate style. Nind moved from Bloomingdale Township to start a farm. He built this house after he retired in 1875. Later renovation incorporated Greek Revival elements into the house.

=== Contributing structures ===
These buildings are not as historically important as "significant" structures but are at least fifty years old and have had minimal alterations.

- 564 Main Street (c. 1890) - Vernacular house partially destroyed in a 1904 fire.
- 569 Main Street (c. 1925) - Craftsman residence.
- 571 Main Street (c. 1920) - Craftsman residence.

=== Intrusions ===
These buildings contrast with the surrounding buildings. Though they are listed as part of the district, they are not historically relevant.

- 580 Main Street (c. 1945) - Ranch-style house
- 587 Main Street (c. 1925) - Dutch Colonial Revival house.
