= Keeneyville School District 20 =

School district in Illinois, United States

Address
- 5540 Arlington Drive East Hanover Park, Illinois, 60133; United States

District information
- Type: Public
- Grades: PreK–8
- NCES District ID: 1720880

Students and staff
- Students: 1,382

Other information
- Website: www.esd20.org

Keeneyville School District 20 (KSD20) is an elementary school district headquartered in Hanover Park, Illinois. The district has three schools. As of 2014 it had over 100 teachers and professional employees as well as over 1,500 students. The district serves the Keeneyville unincorporated area and sections of Hanover Park, Bloomingdale, and Roselle.

== History ==
The school district was originally known as the Lake Street School District 20 and was established in Bloomingdale on October 4, 1887, with a one-room schoolhouse. It initially had one teacher and nine students between the ages of 5 and 12. In 1914 Lake Street School received its first multi-room building. The first recorded instance of the school having a second teacher was in 1941. There were 35 students in 1949 and about 100 by 1964.

By 1950 the district received its current name; its namesake is real estate developer Albert F. Keeney (1872-1950), who originated from Iowa and subdivided several area plots in 1932. He and his family donated money and signage to the Lake Street School.

In 1951 the district installed a gymnasium and an additional classroom at the Lake Street School, and in 1965 four extra classrooms, additional restrooms, a storage room, a boiler, and a teacher lounge were added. Newer facilities later replaced the Lake Street School and was eventually demolished.

== Schools ==
The district's schools include: Spring Wood Middle School in Hanover Park, Greenbrook Elementary School in Hanover Park, Waterbury Elementary School in Roselle, and Early Childhood Center in Hanover Park.
