= Wayne Village Historic District =

Historic district in Illinois, United States

- U.S. National Register of Historic Places
- U.S. Historic district
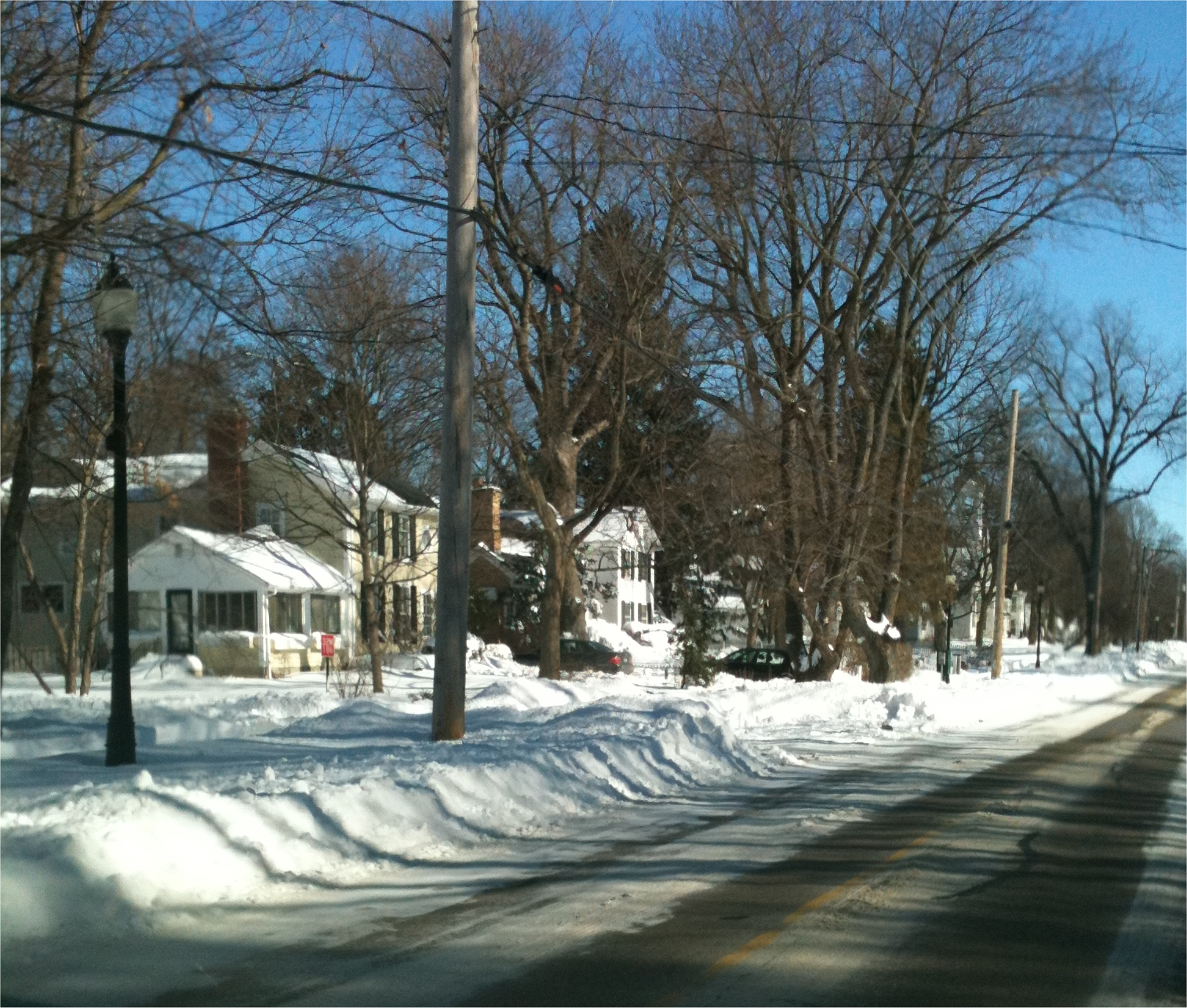

- Location within Illinois Location within the United States
- Location: Irregular pattern along Army Trail Rd. Wayne, Illinois, U.S.
- Coordinates: 41°57′4″N 88°14′46″W
- NRHP reference No.: 78003106
- Added to NRHP: December 29, 1978

The Wayne Village Historic District is a set of fifty-three buildings in Wayne, Illinois.

== History ==
The earliest settler to Wayne was Solomon Dunham, who arrived in 1835. In 1850, the Galena and Chicago Union Railroad connected to the village, and Dunham realized the opportunity to develop the region. He built an inn and a store by the station. Solomon's son Mark Dunham later collaborated with several other area farmers to construct a complex of stables and open the Fletcher Norman Horse Company. The stables gained a great reputation for breeding Percheron horses. The first church in Wayne was erected in 1871, and by the mid-1870s, several small businesses had opened.

By the 1920s, demand for horses had dropped dramatically with the advent of the automobile. The Fletcher Norman Horse Company closed in 1929, ceasing almost all future growth of the suburb. Following incorporation in 1958, Wayne experienced a period of growth, but the older buildings in the village were mostly maintained. The district was added to the National Register of Historic Places on December 29, 1978.

== Buildings ==
The registration form for the Wayne Village Historic District indicates that of the fifty-three buildings in the district, thirty-four contribute to its historical identity. The form, however, lists only fifty-two properties.

- Galena & Chicago Union Railroad Tool House (c. 1850) - The building has been significantly altered and twice moved since its construction.
- Wayne school (c. 1852) - Converted to a residence
- Richard Chipp House (c. 1885) - Moved to its present location before 1890
- Daniel Dunham House (c. 1885) - Moved to its present location in 1888–89. Extensively remodeled.
- Frederick A. Glos House (1910)
- Jane N. Woodcock House (c. 1885–89)
- Albert D. Trull House (1886) - Covered with modern siding
- Adam A. Glos House II (1893)
- 32 W 167 Army Trail Road (c. 1885)
- Herman Will House I (c. 1885)
- Solomon Dunham House (1852) - Wayne's first house. Substantially altered.
- John Warnely House (c. 1913)
- 32 W 245 Army Trail Road (c. 1855–59) - Solomon Dunham may have been involved with its construction.
- James Campbell Hardware Store (c. 1880–85)
- Tom Campbell Store (1904)
- 32 W 252 Army Trail Road - Non-contributing gas station
- Hiram Adams Boot and Shoe Store (c. 1860) - Extendively remodeled as a residence
- 32 W 236 Army Trail Road (date unknown) - Converted to a residence in early 20th century
- Joel Hathaway House (1887) - Front elevation remodeled
- James Creighton House (c. 1913)
- John Dolph House (built before 1874) - Moved to present location in 1920s
- 32 W 164 Army Trail Road (built before 1874) - Greek Revival house
- Adam M. Glos House I (c. 1875–79)
- Adam Glos House (c. 1910)
- Wayne Congregational Church (1871) - Now affiliated with United Church of Christ and known as Little Home Church by the Wayside. Remodeled twice, parish house added in 1946.
- Dr. William L. Guild House (1883)
- Congregational Church Parsonage (1889)
- John Suchalski House (1946)
- C. J. Foley House (c. 1946)
- Byron Ballard House (c. 1872–74) - Extensively remodeled
- Byron Ballard House (c. 1893)
- Walter V. R. Powis House (1904)
- Herman Will House II (c. 1914)
- Albert Will House (1928)
- Walter Peterson House I (1929)
- Walter Peterson House II (c. 1925)
- George Loucks House I (1923)
- George Loucks House II (1926) - Recent addition
- Abner C. Clark House (1925)
- Carl Sauter House (1928–29) - Inappropriate siding
- E. T. Hathaway House (built before 1880) - Moved to present site in 1880s. Extensively remodeled "beyond recognition"
- 32 W 218 Glos Street (date unknown) - Moved to present site before 1900
- Warner Wheeler House I (c. 1885–89)
- Amandus Cover House (1884)
- Warner Wheeler House II (c. 1889)
- Sim Roberts, Jr. House (1887)
- Robert Henderson House (c. 1928)
- Wayne Village Hall (date unknown)
- Reinhart Sherbert House (1887)
- Herman Will House III (1890)
- John Arndt House (c. 1885–89) - Addition in 1916. Previously a post office and tobacco shop until converted into a residence in 1915.
- U. S. Post Office (1956)
