= Fortune 1000 =

Largest American companies by revenue

Fortune 1000 company headquarters locations. Top 20 companies labeled

The Fortune 1000 are the 1,000 largest American companies ranked by revenues, as compiled by the American business magazine Fortune. It only includes companies which are incorporated or authorized to do business in the United States, and for which revenues are publicly available (regardless of whether they are public companies listed on a stock market). The Fortune 500 is the subset of the list that is its 500 largest companies.

The list draws the attention of business readers seeking to learn the influential players in the American economy and prospective sales targets, as these companies tend to have large budgets and staff needs. Walmart was number one on the list for five of the seven years from 2007 to 2014, interrupted only by ExxonMobil in 2009 and 2012.

The following is a list of urban areas by the number of companies on the 2014 Fortune 1000 list that are located there:

Fortune 1000 Companies headquartered in urban areas
Urban area	Number of Fortune 1000 companies	Population (2010 census)
New York—Newark, NY—NJ—CT	114	18,351,295
Chicago, IL—IN	62	8,608,208
San Jose--San Francisco--Oakland, CA	55	4,945,700
Houston, TX	46	4,944,332
Dallas—Fort Worth—Arlington, TX	40	5,121,892
Los Angeles—Long Beach—Anaheim, CA	32	12,150,996
Washington, DC—VA—MD	30	4,586,770
Atlanta, GA	27	4,515,419
Minneapolis—St. Paul, MN—WI	26	2,915,899
Philadelphia, PA—NJ—DE—MD	26	5,441,567
Boston, MA—NH—RI	23	4,181,019
Bridgeport—Stamford, CT—NY	19	923,311
Denver—Aurora, CO	19	2,374,203
St. Louis, MO—IL	18	2,150,706
Detroit, MI	17	3,734,090
Charlotte, NC—SC	15	1,249,442
Pittsburgh, PA	15	1,733,853
Seattle, WA	15	3,059,393
Cincinnati, OH—KY—IN	14	1,624,827
Cleveland, OH	14	1,780,673
Columbus, OH	14	1,368,035
Miami, FL	13	5,502,379
Milwaukee, WI	13	1,376,476
Phoenix—Mesa, AZ	13	3,629,114
Nashville-Davidson, TN	10	969,587
Omaha, NE—IA	10	725,008
Richmond, VA	10	953,556
Indianapolis, IN	9	1,487,483
Kansas City, MO—KS	8	1,519,417
Baltimore, MD	7	2,203,663
Las Vegas—Henderson, NV	7	1,886,011
Providence, RI—MA	7	1,190,956
San Antonio, TX	7	1,758,210
Tampa—St. Petersburg, FL	7	2,441,770
Tulsa, OK	7	655,479
Hartford, CT	6	924,859
Memphis, TN—MS—AR	6	1,060,061
Oklahoma City, OK	5	861,505
San Diego, CA	5	2,956,746
Toledo, OH—MI	5	507,643
Birmingham, AL	4	749,495
Conroe—The Woodlands, TX	4	239,938
Grand Rapids, MI	4	569,935
Harrisburg, PA	4	444,474
Jacksonville, FL	4	1,065,219
Louisville/Jefferson County, KY—IN	4	972,546
Portland, OR—WA	4	1,849,898
Akron, OH	3	569,499
Allentown, PA—NJ	3	664,651
Boise City, ID	3	349,684
Concord, CA	3	615,968
Des Moines, IA	3	450,070
Evansville, IN—KY	3	229,351
Fayetteville—Springdale—Rogers, AR—MO	3	295,083
Knoxville, TN	3	558,696
Madison, WI	3	401,661
Raleigh, NC	3	884,891
Reading, PA	3	266,254
Rochester, NY	3	720,572
Thousand Oaks, CA	3	214,811
Twin Rivers—Hightstown, NJ	3	64,037
Virginia Beach, VA	3	1,439,666
Winston-Salem, NC	3	391,024
Appleton, WI	2	216,154
Bloomington—Normal, IL	2	132,600
Buffalo, NY	2	935,906
Canton, OH	2	279,245
Columbus, GA—AL	2	253,602
Dayton, OH	2	724,091
El Dorado, AR Urban Cluster	2	18,944
Findlay, OH Urban Cluster	2	48,441
Greensboro, NC	2	311,810
Lexington-Fayette, KY	2	290,263
Little Rock, AR	2	431,388
New Haven, CT	2	562,839
Riverside—San Bernardino, CA	2	1,932,666
Salt Lake City—West Valley City, UT	2	1,021,243
San Juan, PR	2	2,148,346
Springfield, MA—CT	2	621,300
Urban Honolulu, HI	2	802,459
Warsaw, IN Urban Cluster	2	30,166
York, PA	2	232,045
Albany—Schenectady, NY	1	594,962
Allegan, MI Urban Cluster	1	6,322
Ann Arbor, MI	1	306,022
Asheville, NC	1	280,648
Austin, MN Urban Cluster	1	25,103
Austin, TX	1	1,362,416
Barre—Montpelier, VT Urban Cluster	1	21,675
Baton Rouge, LA	1	594,309
Battle Creek, MI	1	78,393
Beloit, WI—IL	1	63,835
Benton Harbor—St. Joseph—Fair Plain, MI	1	61,022
Bismarck, ND	1	81,955
Bristol—Bristol, TN—VA	1	69,501
Burlington, NC	1	119,911
Calhoun, GA Urban Cluster	1	31,493
Cape Coral, FL	1	530,290
Carthage, MO Urban Cluster	1	15,496
Cedar Rapids, IA	1	177,844
Chattanooga, TN—GA	1	381,112
Columbia, SC	1	549,777
Columbus, IN	1	54,933
Corning, NY Urban Cluster	1	20,477
Corpus Christi, TX	1	320,069
Danbury, CT—NY	1	168,136
Davenport, IA—IL	1	280,051
Decatur, IL	1	93,863
Durham, NC	1	347,602
East Aurora, NY Urban Cluster	1	9,841
El Paso, TX—NM	1	803,086
Elkhart, IN—MI	1	143,592
Erie, PA	1	196,611
Fargo, ND—MN	1	176,676
Fort Collins, CO	1	264,465
Fort Smith, AR—OK	1	122,947
Fort Wayne, IN	1	313,492
Galveston, TX Urban Cluster	1	44,022
Hartsville, SC Urban Cluster	1	15,125
Hickory, NC	1	212,195
High Point, NC	1	166,485
Jackson, MI	1	90,057
Kalamazoo, MI	1	209,703
Kenosha, WI—IL	1	124,064
Kingsport, TN—VA	1	106,571
Kissimmee, FL	1	314,071
Lake Jackson—Angleton, TX	1	74,830
Lakeland, FL	1	262,596
Lancaster, PA	1	402,004
Lansing, MI	1	313,532
Laurel, MS Urban Cluster	1	26,131
Lebanon, TN Urban Cluster	1	27,653
Mandeville—Covington, LA	1	88,925
Manitowoc, WI Urban Cluster	1	46,360
Marysville, OH Urban Cluster	1	22,348
Mauldin—Simpsonville, SC	1	120,577
Medford, OR	1	154,081
Midland, MI	1	59,014
Midland, TX	1	117,807
Mission Viejo—Lake Forest—San Clemente, CA	1	583,681
Monroe, LA	1	116,533
Muscatine, IA Urban Cluster	1	25,342
Nashua, NH—MA	1	226,400
New Orleans, LA	1	899,703
Newton, NJ Urban Cluster	1	11,941
Orlando, FL	1	1,510,516
Orrville, OH Urban Cluster	1	8,563
Oshkosh, WI	1	74,495
Palm Bay—Melbourne, FL	1	452,791
Peoria, IL	1	266,921
Portsmouth, NH—ME	1	88,200
Provo—Orem, UT	1	482,819
Quincy, IL Urban Cluster	1	45,228
Reno, NV—CA	1	392,141
Roanoke, VA	1	210,111
Rock Hill, SC	1	104,996
Sarasota—Bradenton, FL	1	643,260
Sidney, NE Urban Cluster	1	6,373
Smithfield, VA Urban Cluster	1	10,215
Spokane, WA	1	387,847
Springfield, MO	1	273,724
St. George, UT	1	98,370
Stevens Point, WI Urban Cluster	1	44,223
Sunbury, PA Urban Cluster	1	29,541
Thomasville, GA Urban Cluster	1	24,139
Topeka, KS	1	150,003
Trenton, NJ	1	296,668
Warren, PA Urban Cluster	1	15,420
Waterbury, VT Urban Cluster	1	2,971
Watsonville, CA	1	73,534
Winona, MN Urban Cluster	1	30,712
Worcester, MA—CT	1	486,514

== See also ==
- Fortune Global 500
- List of largest companies by revenue
