= Westmont Community Unit School District 201 =

School district in Illinois, United States

Address
- 133 South Grant Street Westmont, Illinois, 60559; United States

District information
- Type: Public
- Grades: PreK–12
- NCES District ID: 1741980

Students and staff
- Students: 1,295

Other information
- Website: www.cusd201.org

Westmont Community Unit School District 201 is a school district headquartered in Westmont, Illinois, United States, that serves students from Westmont, Clarendon Hills, and Downers Grove.

== Demographics ==
In 2007, the Westmont Community Unit School District enrolled 1626 students. Of those students, 74.7% were white, 7.1% were black, 12.2% were Hispanic, and 5.2% were Asian/Pacific Islander; multi-racial/ethic students comprised 0.9% of the population. Low-income students comprised 25.3% of the district, and 4.9% of students had limited English proficiency.

To serve these students, the District had 131 teachers. The teaching staff was 95.6% white, 2.6% black, and 1.8% Asian/Pacific Islander; no teachers identified as Hispanic or as Native American. The female-male split was 70.9%-29.1%. Those holding a master's degree or above made up 76.4% of the teacher body, and no classes were taught by non-highly qualified teachers. The teachers had on average 15.2 years of experience and the average teacher salary was $74,532.

The Junior High School serves approximately 45 deaf and hard-of-hearing students in grades 6 through 8, providing interpreting services to the mainstreamed students. Deaf and hard-of-hearing students attend elementary and high school in other school districts.

== Funding ==
The school district is mainly funded by local property taxes (77.5% of funds for the District, as opposed to 58.8% of funds for schools across Illinois). In 2005-2006, the District spent $14,285 per pupil; the state average was $9,488.

== Academics ==
The high school graduation rate is 91.6%. In 2007, 100% of Black and Asian/Pacific Islander students graduated; white students graduated at a rate of 90.4% and Hispanic students at a rate of 90.0%. Limited English proficiency students had a graduation rate of 50.0%, and students with disabilities had a graduation rate of 62.5%; these rates are both below the state average. The graduation rate for economically disadvantaged students was above the state average at 80.0%.

The average ACT composite score upon graduation was 20.5, slightly above the state average of 20.3. The District ACT scores were slightly lower than the state public school average in English and Mathematics, and slightly higher in Reading and Science.

== Schools ==
=== Early Childhood Center ===
School's name	Year opened
South Early Childhood Center.	N/A. Formerly known as South Elementary.

=== Elementary schools ===
School's name	Year opened
J.T. Manning Elementary School	1921, current building 1928, addition 1949, renamed 1983, reopened 2012–2013
C.E. Miller Elementary School	Opened 1958
South Elementary School	Opened 1921, closed 2007

=== Junior high schools ===
School's name	Year opened
Westmont Junior High School	1955, moved buildings in 1974

=== High schools ===
School's name	Year opened
Westmont High School	1974, current building 1976
