= Film criticism =

Analysis and evaluation of films

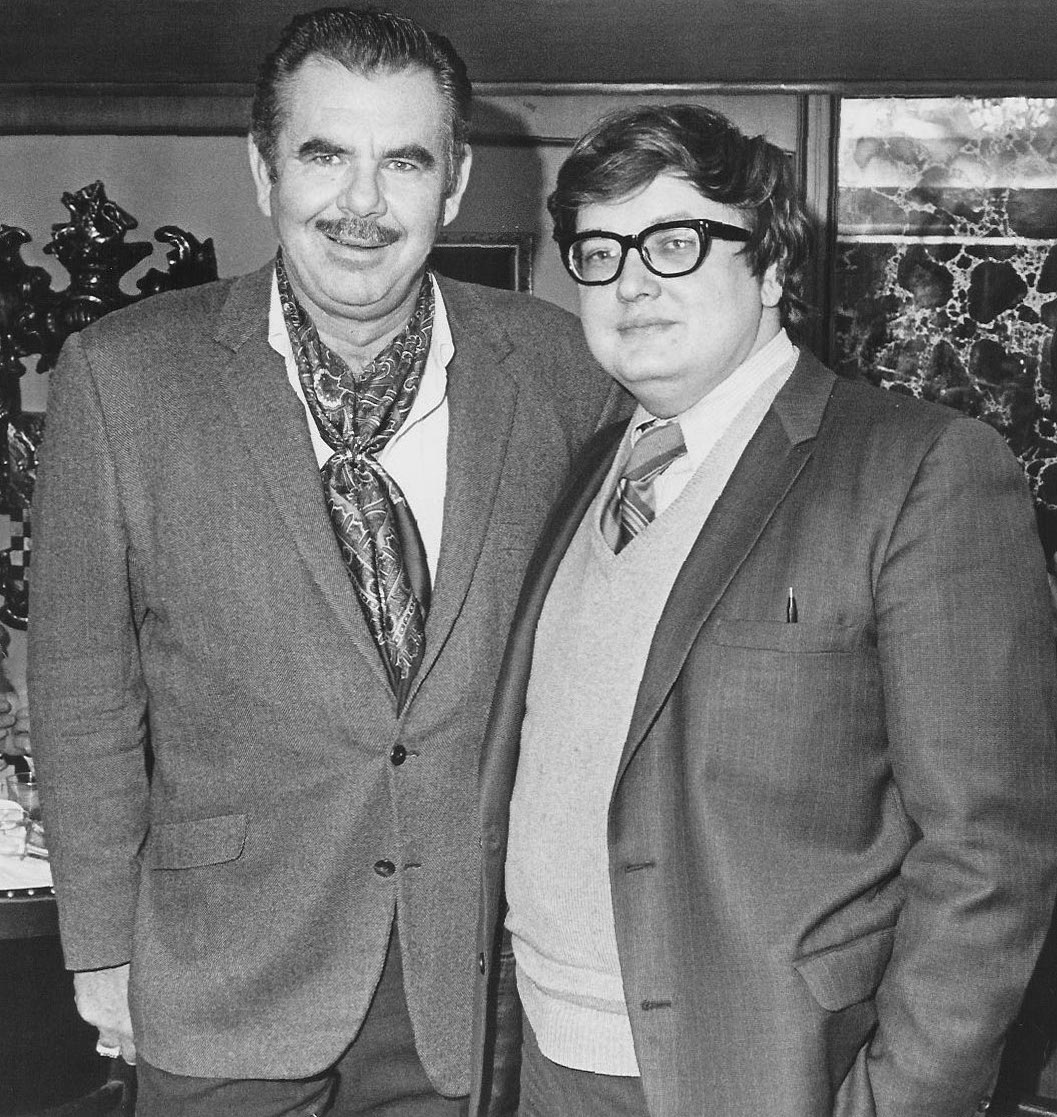
Chicago critic Roger Ebert (right) with director Russ Meyer

Film criticism is the analysis and evaluation of films and the film medium. In general, film criticism can be divided into two categories: Academic criticism by film scholars, who study the composition of film theory and publish their findings and essays in books and journals, and general journalistic criticism that appears regularly in press newspapers, magazines and other popular mass-media outlets. Academic film criticism rarely takes the form of a review; instead it is more likely to analyse the film and its place in the history of its genre, the industry and film history as a whole.

Film criticism is also labeled as a type of writing that perceives films as possible achievements and wishes to convey their differences, as well as the films being made in a level of quality that is satisfactory or unsatisfactory. Film criticism is also associated with the journalistic type of criticism, which is grounded in the media's effects being developed, and journalistic criticism resides in standard structures such as newspapers. Journal articles pertaining to films served as representatives for the film critics who desired to increase the amount of communication about movies to a high degree that ascended above content that was normally featured in popular publications. The critics who work in the media are normally commissionaires who affect culture, since the judgments and choices of critics have the effect of influencing what audience members perceive about objects that are supplied to them, and critics are also able to influence how the audience members choose to think about objects that are supplied to them.

In the current era of history, film criticism is rich in having digital devices that allow films to be analyzed through visual and auditory methods that involve critical strategies of creativity that allow people to become immersed in film criticism. Film criticism is also associated with the cultural type of criticism, which is also referred to as academic criticism, and academic criticism is able to primarily make interpretations of films from the viewpoint of directors while the interpretations place emphasis on parallels that films have with previous works that were deemed to be of high quality.

A severe negative film criticism is called "panning" (the meaning is based on the word "frying pan" and is originated much earlier than the cinematographic term "panning").

== History ==
Film was introduced in the late 19th century. The earliest artistic criticism of film emerged in the early 1900s. The first paper to serve as a critique of the film came out of The Optical Lantern and Cinematograph Journal, followed by the Bioscope in 1908.

Film is a relatively new form of art, in comparison to music, literature and painting which have existed since ancient times. Early writing on film sought to argue that films could also be considered a form of art. In 1911, Ricciotto Canudo wrote a manifesto proclaiming cinema to be the "Sixth Art" (later "Seventh Art"). For many decades after, film was still being accorded less prestige than longer-established art forms. In Sweden, serious film criticism was spearheaded by Bengt Idestam-Almquist, whom the Swedish Film Institute has called the father of Swedish film criticism.

By the 1910s, critics were analyzing film for its merit and value, and as more than just entertainment. Kitty Kelly writing for the Chicago Tribune was an early example of an American critic using this approach. The growing popularity of the medium caused major newspapers to start hiring film critics. In the 1930s, the film industry saw audiences grow increasingly silent as films were now accompanied by sound. However, in the late 1930s audiences became influenced by print news sources reporting on movies and criticism became largely centered around audience reactions within the theaters.

In the decades of the 1930s and the 1940s, the type of criticism pertaining to films had to overcome some difficult challenges. The first difficult challenge involves how film criticism in the 1930s decade did not have any stable foundations to reside on, and film criticism also involved critics having vocabularies that were limited. During the 1930s, the jobs of critics weren't perceived to be great and critics did not earn high wages for their work. The next difficult challenge involves the fact that the industry related to film even attempted to use intimidation as a way of making movie critics cease with reviewing films. In the year of 1948, a critic named Eileen Arnot Robertson was forcibly removed from her job as a critic. Despite the fact that she filed a lawsuit against the film industry, the film industry said that Robertson's firing did not occur out of maliciousness. These difficult challenges led to the existences of movie critics who had respect for films, and those new film critics sought to make film criticism be a respected job.

In the 1940s, new forms of criticism emerged. Essays analyzing films were written with a distinctive charm and style, and sought to persuade the reader to accept the critic's argument. This trend brought film criticism into the mainstream, gaining the attention of many popular magazines; this eventually made film reviews and critiques a staple among most print media. As the decades passed, some critics gained fame, and a few became household names, among them James Agee, Andrew Sarris, Pauline Kael, and more recently Roger Ebert and Peter Travers.

The film industry also got the chance to see that sound was able to influence how people behaved in movie theaters. When people spoke or made other kinds of sounds, they would be causing disruptions that created difficulties for people to listen to the conversations that were occurring in films. Audience members changed how they behaved in movie theaters, since they would shush people as a way of communicating the messages related to telling other people that they needed to be silent. By keeping themselves in silence, audience members such as film critics were able to make all of their attention be on the movies that they were watching.

== Journalistic criticism ==
Film critics working for newspapers, magazines, broadcast media, and online publications mainly review new releases, although they also review older films. An important task for these reviews is to help readers decide whether they want to see a particular film. A film review will typically explain the premise of the film before discussing its merits or flaws. The verdict is often summarized using a rating system, such as 5- or 4-star scales, academic-style grades, and pictograms (such as those used by the San Francisco Chronicle). Film reviews are created with the purposes of making the characters, movie plots, and the directors be known in detailed descriptions to influence audience members into deciding if films need to be viewed or be ignored.

Some well-known journalistic critics are James Agee (Time, The Nation); Vincent Canby (The New York Times); Roger Ebert (Chicago Sun-Times); Mark Kermode (BBC, The Observer); James Berardinelli; Philip French (The Observer); Pauline Kael (The New Yorker); Manny Farber (The New Republic, Time, The Nation); Peter Bradshaw (The Guardian); Michael Phillips (Chicago Tribune); Andrew Sarris (The Village Voice); Joel Siegel (Good Morning America); Jonathan Rosenbaum (Chicago Reader); and Christy Lemire (What The Flick?!).

Roger Ebert and Gene Siskel popularised the practice of reviewing films via a television program, in the show Siskel & Ebert At the Movies, which became syndicated in the 1980s. Both critics had established their careers in print media, and continued to write reviews for newspapers during the run of their television show.

== Format for film critics to write film criticisms ==
Research says that there are ways in how film critics are able to write criticisms that involve critical discussions containing rationality. When critics are looking for film criticisms that are factual, they must not behave with excessive optimism or be too demanding. Creations and criticisms are activities that humans participate in, and these activities cannot be substituted out for an objective list of morals to be utilized. Humans are restrained by the fact that criticisms cannot communicate messages for forms of artwork, and only the artworks can communicate their messages. The second way in how film critics are able to write criticisms that involve critical discussions containing rationality involves critics analyzing their reasons for not liking specific movies, and critics must discover if they dislike movies for the same criteria that caused them to initially dislike specific movies.

That requires utilizing criticism that is analytical and thorough with detail. The third way in how film critics are able to write criticisms that involve critical discussions containing rationality involves critics making blatant statements that are scientific in regards to the workings of films, and how the films are able to affect people. In fact, viewers can watch films to see if they are affected by the movies in the same way that the film critics were affected by them. The fourth way in how film critics are able to write criticisms that involve critical discussions containing rationality involves critics being less arrogant when they want they perceptions of films to be talked about, and critics must be aware of criticisms that have been published.

The critics who want to argue must base their arguments in criticisms that have been stated by other critics. The fourth way in how film critics are able to write criticisms that involve critical discussions containing rationality pertains to critics moving away from the idea that artwork such as a film shall have clear meanings. Instead, critics must view artwork such as films to be the results of working hard, many hours of thinking, and ideas being compromised for meanings to not be clear. This research concludes that film critics must repeatedly view films as a way of studying them, if they desire to write thorough reviews on those particular films. Secondly, film critics have the task of making sure that they are highly informed about the film and film critics are also responsible for initiating the discussions about the films.

Film critics are also responsible for knowing the creators of the films. Thirdly, film critics must blatantly state their own biases and preferences without associating them with any theories. Fourthly, film critics must appreciate the films that are given positive criticisms and film critics must not be ungrateful towards those films. Finally, a film critic must enjoy the movies that they are criticizing. In this specific regard, a film critic must also want to make their reviews persuade other people watch the movies that the film critic has criticized.

== Film critics and audience members ==
In the academic field of films and cinema, several studies involving research have discovered a positive connection between film critics evaluating films and how well the films perform with audience members. Also, studies involving research in the fields of films and cinema have discovered a connection between film critics evaluating films and audience members having interests or no interests in viewing those films. Based in the perspective of an audience member, a review serves as more than an object that is useful for making decisions. Listening to a review from a critic, watching a critic's review, and reading a critic's review are all ways in which the review is useful to an audience member. The critic's review is able to be referenced in conversations where audience members communicate with other individuals, and audience members can communicate messages about the artistic film that was critically examined or connect the criticism to problems that occur in society. Research has also found that critics' evaluations can vary with the racial alignment between critics and movie casts. A 2025 study found that ratings became less favorable as the proportion of Black cast members increased, but this association was attenuated among Black critics; it also found that critic ratings became less aligned with audience ratings and box-office performance as Black cast representation increased.

== Online film criticism ==
=== Aggregators ===
Websites such as Rotten Tomatoes and Metacritic seek to improve the usefulness of film reviews by compiling them and assigning a score to each in order to gauge the general reception a film receives. Another aggregator is the Movie Review Query Engine, which is a large data storage on the internet that stores interviews, reviews about movies, news, and other kinds of materials that pertain to specific films. These areas of storage are not intended to help people find specific films or movie content that has aired on television, but the storages are able to help people find reliable film criticisms that can be used as readings for students.

=== Online film critics ===
Blogs are a good example to view in relation to how the internet has grown to where social networks and live chats exist alongside websites such as YouTube where people can post their own content. That is because blogging has created new ways for people to make themselves engage with cinematic movies. People who engage themselves with movies choose to participate in various forms of film criticism by using video or DVD clips from YouTube that are placed alongside parts of other films for the sound effects or images from the other films to be used in criticizing the sounds or images that pertain to the YouTube clips that are being criticized. Film critics are also reviewers who are amateurs on websites such as IMDb. Also, many postings from amateur film critics are on IMDb.

Some websites specialize in narrow aspects of film reviewing. For instance, there are sites that focus on specific content advisories for parents to judge a film's suitability for children. Others focus on a religious perspective (e.g. CAP Alert). Still others highlight more esoteric subjects such as the depiction of science in fiction films. One such example is Insultingly Stupid Movie Physics by Intuitor. Some online niche websites provide comprehensive coverage of the independent sector; usually adopting a style closer to print journalism. They tend to prohibit advertisement and offer uncompromising opinions free of any commercial interest. Their film critics normally have an academic film background.

The Online Film Critics Society, an international professional association of Internet-based cinema reviewers, consists of writers from all over the world, while New York Film Critics Online members handle reviews in the New York tri-state area.

Online film criticism has provided online film critics with challenges related to journalism's purpose changing on the internet. For example, critics must contend with the drawback of too many critics being online to the extent of preventing critics from writing original statements. Critics can write original statements online, but there are websites that will steal their ideas and not give credit to the author. Another challenge in film criticism pertains to film critics being pressured into writing reviews that are hasty, since users of the internet will give their attention to other topics if film critics do not post movie reviews quickly.

=== User-submitted reviews ===
Community-driven review sites, that allow internet users to submit personal movie reviews, have allowed the common movie goer to express their opinion on films. Many of these sites allow users to rate films on a 0 to 10 scale, while some rely on the star rating system of 1–5, 0–5 or 0–4 stars. The votes are then converted into an overall rating and ranking for any particular film. Some of these community driven review sites include Letterboxd, Reviewer, Movie Attractions, Flixster, FilmCrave, Flickchart and Everyone's a Critic. Rotten Tomatoes and Metacritic aggregate both scores from accredited critics and those submitted by users.

On these online review sites, users generally only have to register with the site in order to submit reviews. This means that they are a form of open access poll, and have the same advantages and disadvantages; notably, there is no guarantee that they will be a representative sample of the film's audience. In some cases, online review sites have produced wildly differing results to scientific polling of audiences. Likewise, reviews and ratings for many movies can greatly differ between the different review sites, even though there are certain movies that are well-rated (or poorly-rated) across the board.

Research has found that moviegoers are inclined to leave reviews for films that are not available in movie theaters, and the amount of reviews will decrease as the films earn more money each week. When the amount of money that films earn in movie theaters is increasing, the expected quantity of movie reviews that were posted at prior points in time also increases. This ends up making individuals experience increases in their desires to write movie reviews about films that are earning high quantities of money. When movies are given high ratings, those high ratings are able to persuade viewers of movies to watch other films that share aspects of the movies that viewers prefer to see. The explanations for why movies are given high ratings are able to reach online groups of people who watch movies, and the explanations for movies having high ratings are explained through the usage of reviews that are posted in those online groups.

== Academic film criticism ==
More often known as film theory or film studies, academic critique explores cinema beyond journalistic film reviews. These film critics try to examine why film works, how it works aesthetically or politically, what it means, and what effects it has on people. Rather than write for mass-market publications their articles are usually published in scholarly journals and texts which tend to be affiliated with university presses; or sometimes in up-market magazines.

Most academic criticism of film often follows a similar format. They usually include summaries of the plot of the film to either refresh the plot to the reader or reinforce an idea of repetition in the film's genre. After this, there tends to be discussions about the cultural context, major themes and repetitions, and details about the legacy of the film.

Academic film criticism, or film studies can also be taught in academia, and is featured in many California colleges because they are located near the home of the United States film industry: Hollywood. Some of these colleges include University of California, Davis, University of California, Berkeley, University of California, Los Angeles, Stanford University, as well as many other colleges across the world.

Academic criticism is typically divided and taught in the form of many different disciplines that tackle critique in different manners. These can include:

- Formalism, that analyzes the way that things are done and the appearance of their form or shape.
- Structuralism, that examines the way that movies are sequenced, have a dedicated style, and the way that language and art itself can create meaning.
- Historical, a form of criticism that doesn't look at the direct things being said, but the culture and surrounding environments of a given film. The historical critic will create meaning from something that is not explicitly stated or shown in the film.
- Psychoanalysis, that breaks down the unconscious that one can experience while observing a given film.
- Political and economic, which not only looks into how economics and politics are depicted directly inside the film, but also how it affects the film's creation, marketing, screening, and sale.
- Environmental criticism, sometimes called ecocinema or ecomedia, which examines the ways that the environment, and environmental problems are portrayed in film, the ways that the production and distribution of film contributes to (or helps solve) environmental problems, and the way that popular films tend to avoid or minimize environmental problems.

Academic film criticism is associated with formalism, which involves visual aspects and the rules regarding how they are organized as if they were forms of artwork. Formalism also involves stages of development occurring in an orderly manner, such as learning easy instructions before learning difficult ones. Stages of development in formalism also involved organized stages of development that are orderly, and one example involves people learning simple instructions before they have to follow instructions that involve complexity.

Academic film criticism is also associated with structuralism, which involves controlling a situation in an attempt to make it be coherent, and all the aspects of a situation are assumed to be in a structured order.

Academic film criticism tackles many aspects of film making and production as well as distribution. These disciplines include camera work, digitalization, lighting, and sound. Narratives, dialogues, themes, and genres are among many other things that academic film critics take into consideration and evaluate when engaging in critique.

Some notable academic film critics include André Bazin, Jean-Luc Godard and François Truffaut (all writers for Cahiers du Cinéma); Kristin Thompson, David Bordwell, and Sergei Eisenstein. Godard, Truffaut and Eisenstein were also film directors.

The critics that participated in academic film criticism during the years between 2002 and 2006 had written reviews pertaining to the fact that they disapproved of modern films that were in the horror genre. In the year 2002, a critic named Reynold Humphries made his own discussion in The American Horror Film reach its end when he said that the horror genre's films were not good, and Humphries also stated that films in the horror genre weren't enjoyable. A critic named Kendall Phillips wrote a book titled Projected Fears, and ending the book during the year 2006 involved Phillips saying that American horror films had fallen into the cycle of being movies that had predictability.

Film theory is also part of academic film criticism, since two main film theories have been created. The first main film theory is the part-whole theory. This theory pertains to Eisenstein's philosophy that segments of films are not artistic works on their own, and they are just unemotional aspects of reality. When those segments of films are sequenced in the form of a montage, then the films are artwork. The second film theory is that films are related to reality. Bazin's philosophy involves movies being connected to the real world, which is reality.

== Issues and controversies ==
=== Influence ===
Film critics are able to be influencers in the circumstances of persuading moviegoers to view or not view in the beginning weeks of movies being available for people to view them. Research has found that negative and positive film reviews are connected to the amounts of money that films earn in box offices over a duration of eight weeks of time, which displays the fact that film critics are influential towards how well films perform in box offices. Film critics are able to influence the choices of people in the public who decide on whether or not they will view a film. Film critics frequently receive invitations to early viewings of movies before the movies are available to all of the moviegoers who aren't film critics, and viewing films at early points in time allows the film critics to write film reviews that are influential to other moviegoers. Film critics have access to information regarding the earliest phases of films, unlike the public, and the earliest phases of films are when film critics are the only reliable sources of information pertaining to the movies that will be in theaters. Research has also displayed the fact that film critics desire to give moviegoers encouragement towards viewing films that are worth viewing while they also display innovation, instead of viewing movies that are simplistic.

However, in recent years, there has been a growing belief in the film industry that critic aggregators (especially Rotten Tomatoes) are increasing the collective influence of film critics. The underperformance of several films in 2017 was blamed on their low scores on Rotten Tomatoes. This has led to studies such as one commissioned by 20th Century Fox claiming that younger viewers give the website more credibility than the major studio marketing, which undercuts its effectiveness.

Today, fan-run film analysis websites like Letterboxd, Box Office Prophets, CineBee and Box Office Guru routinely factor more into the opinions of the general public on films produced.

=== Controversies ===
Research says that academic studies pertaining to films had a thorough histiography pertaining to films, which also included different styles of films throughout history. However, the academic studies almost made film criticism reach its end. The academic type of writing pertaining to films had created knowledge, which ended up appearing in areas that had been useful for writing film criticisms in a traditional style. Writing about academic films puts emphasis on generalized statements that can be verified. Writing academic films also involves film critics preferring to view films that are typical, instead of viewing films that are bizarre. That is because ordinary kinds of films can be reviewed with generalized statements that can be verified.

=== Female representation ===
There have been many complaints against the film-criticism industry for its underrepresentation of women. A study of the top critics on Rotten Tomatoes shows that 91 per cent of writers for movie or entertainment magazines and websites are men, as are 90 per cent of those for trade publications, 80 per cent of critics for general interest magazines like Time, and 70 per cent of reviewers for radio formats such as NPR.

Writing for The Atlantic, Kate Kilkenny argued that women were better represented in film criticism before the rise of the Internet. In the past, when film was considered less prestigious than visual art and literature, it was easier for women to break into film criticism. In the year 1929, Iris Barry was a female film critic from Britain. When Barry lived in London, she earned money from being a writer for magazines, a newspaper, and periodical articles. Barry wrote film criticisms that discussed films that were made in Britain, films that were made in America, and Barry only wrote film criticisms on a selective amount of German movies. Barry also wrote film criticisms for French movies that were made as experiments. Barry wrote film criticisms with a critical amount of analysis. Judith Crist and Pauline Kael were two of the most influential film critics of the 1960s and 1970s. The Internet led to a decline in jobs at small newspapers where women were more likely to review films, whereas the more male-dominated jobs at major newspapers survived better. The Internet also encouraged a growth in niche review websites that were even more male-dominated than older media. Kilkenny also suggested that the shortage of female critics was related to the shortage of female opinion columnists.

Clem Bastow, culture writer at The Guardian Australia, discussed the possible effects of this on the critical response to the 2015 film The Intern, which received mixed reviews from critics:

The critical response to The Intern was fascinating. There's a subset of male critics that clearly see Nancy Meyers as code for chick flick and react with according bile. What's very interesting, though, is that I think female critics, working in an industry that is coded as very male, if not macho, often feel the need to go hard on certain films for women, presumably because they worry that they'll be dismissed, critically speaking, if they praise a film like The Intern as though they're only reviewing it favorably because they're women.

Matt Reynolds of Wired pointed out that "men tend to look much more favorably on films with more masculine themes, or male leading actors." On online review sites such as IMDb, this leads to skewed, imbalanced review results as 70 per cent of reviewers on the site are men.

A study using Johanson analysis was used evaluate the representation of women in 270 films. Johanson complied statistics for the year 2015 on how having a female protagonist affected a movie, with the following results:

1. 22% of 2015's movies had female protagonists.
2. Critics are slightly more likely to rate a film highly if it represents women well.
3. Mainstream moviegoers are not turned off by films with female protagonists.
4. Movies that represent women well are just as likely to be profitable as movies that do not, and are less risky as business propositions.

=== Ideology ===
James Harris, writing for right-wing political magazine The Critic, claimed that "Previously engaging review sites such as Vox, The Guardian and The Onion AV Club have all become The World Social Justice Website, and they are now assessing works in all disciplines in line with wider social justice criteria. Does the artwork highlight social justice issues? Does it adequately meet Equality and Diversity briefs? Is the artwork, in one of the words of the age, problematic?"

== Salary of critics ==
As of 2021, the Salary Expert website reported that American professional movie critics earned a yearly average salary of $63,474.

As of 2013, American film critics earned about US$82,000 a year. Newspaper and magazine critics made $27,364-$49,574. Online movie critics earned $2-$200 per review. TV critics made up to $40,000-$60,000 per month.

== See also ==
- Prestige picture
- List of film critics
- List of film journals and magazines
- List of films considered the best
- List of films considered the worst
- For the Love of Movies: The Story of American Film Criticism, a 2009 documentary film
