= Forest Preserve District of DuPage County =

Government agency in Illinois, US

The Forest Preserve District of DuPage County is a governmental agency headquartered in Wheaton, Illinois, United States. Its mission is to acquire and hold lands containing forests, prairies, wetlands, and associated plant communities or lands capable of being restored to such natural conditions for the purpose of protecting and preserving the flora, fauna and scenic beauty for the education, pleasure and recreation of the citizens of DuPage County.

== History ==
The Forest Preserve District of DuPage County was established in 1915, when voters cast ballots to protect against the removal of woodlands. For its first year of operation, $8,000 was appropriated to create, manage and maintain the new Forest Preserve District. County supervisors who governed the District spent the next two years working out operating details for the fifth county forest preserve district in the United States. In 1917, the first tax levy was made, and the first preserve land was purchased: 79 acres (320,000 m^{2}) in Oak Brook, called York Woods. Today, the Forest Preserve District owns or manages nearly 25,000 acres (100 km^{2}) and has an annual operating expense of approximately $65 million.

== Board of Commissioners ==
The Forest Preserve District is currently governed by a seven-member Board of Commissioners. Voters in each of the six county districts elect one commissioner from each district. The seventh commissioner, the president, is elected by the county at large by popular vote.

The Board of Commissioners translates the open-space needs of county residents into ordinances designed to protect and enhance natural areas and to ensure an enjoyable experience for all.

== Funding ==
The primary sources of District funds are property taxes and the sale of bonds. In 2006, 2.2% of all county property taxes supported the Forest Preserve District. Additional financial assistance comes from grants and support groups that lend a hand through fundraising efforts. The District's enterprise operations, which include three golf facilities, generate their own revenue.

== Land management ==
The District continues to acquire parcels of valuable open spaces throughout the county to keep pace with the continuous sprawl of the urban landscape. Properties are evaluated based on their fair-market value and are considered based on the land's natural condition, resident flora and fauna, and other features such as connectivity to greenways, river ways and existing preserves. The District focuses on managing the land through an innovative program to restore and preserve the county's ecosystems, in conjunction with ongoing efforts in reforestation and prairie restoration. The controlled use of fire and other natural-resource management methods continue to be used as tools in clearing natural areas of aggressive nonnative plants and encouraging the growth of native plant species.

== Recreational activities ==
With almost 25,000 acres (100 km^{2}) containing 31 lakes, 145 miles (233 km) of trails and 1,450 picnic tables, DuPage County's forest preserves offer outdoor enthusiasts opportunities to enjoy open-air activities, such as birding, boating, camping, fishing, picnicking, cross-country skiing, horseback riding, bicycling or hiking.

== Education Facilities ==
=== Danada Equestrian Center ===
Since 1984, the Danada Equestrian Center, located within the Danada Forest Preserve in Wheaton, has provided educational and recreational equestrian experiences for DuPage County residents. Danada programs are designed to give a holistic approach to horses and their daily care and to teach basic riding skills to participants 12 and older. Programs include introductory and advanced horsemanship classes, group tours, summer camps, seminars and clinics. Horse-drawn hayrides and sleigh rides are available seasonally for groups and individuals. In addition, on the second Sunday of every October, the equestrian center hosts the Danada Fall Festival, a day-long celebration of the horse that features demonstrations by several breeds, educational displays, food, music and children's activities.

==== Danada House ====
To the north of the Danada Equestrian Center is the Danada House. The 19-room estate, the former home of Daniel F. Rice and Ada L. Rice, is available for receptions, meetings, showers, parties and other catered functions. The house, which includes a bright, airy annex with large windows that create a garden-like atmosphere, can accommodate up to 250 people. The facility is managed by the Friends of Danada, a nonprofit volunteer group that also operates the Forest Preserves District's 1950s Danada model farm.

=== Fullersburg Woods Nature Education Center ===
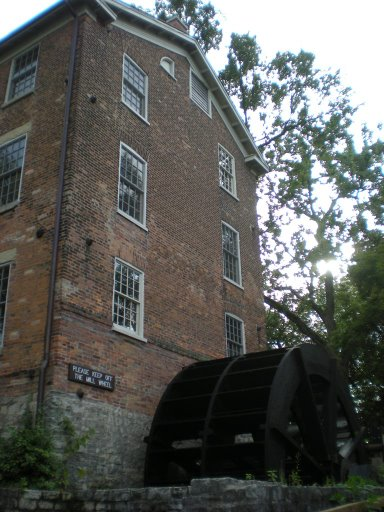
Graue Mill

Fullersburg Woods Nature Education Center, which is a part of Fullersburg Woods Forest Preserve in Oak Brook, provides a look at DuPage County's natural environments and the changes that have occurred over time to create them. The visitor center features interactive, educational displays, including exhibits on modern flora and fauna as well as on the area's natural history, such as the remains of a 13,000-year-old woolly mammoth. Adults and schoolchildren alike have the opportunity to get a closer look at native plants and animals by exploring preserve trails or joining scheduled programming.

==== Graue Mill ====
Two-thirds of a mile from Fullersburg Woods Nature Education Center, just down Salt Creek, is the Graue Mill and Museum. This historic property allows visitors to see the mill operate as it did over a century ago.

=== Kline Creek Farm ===
Kline Creek Farm is an 1890s living history farm owned and operated by the Forest Preserve District of DuPage County. The farm consists of a 200-acre (0.81 km^{2}) farmsite featuring restored and re-created buildings representing life on a typical DuPage County Farm in the late 19th century. The farm is located in the 1,150-acre (4.7 km^{2}) Timber Ridge Forest Preserve in West Chicago, Illinois.

Kline Creek Farm is open to the public year-round from 9:00 AM until 5:00 PM (Central Time), Thursday through Monday and is closed on Tuesday and Wednesday. Admission is free.

A restored farmhouse and barn are located near working reproductions of a summer kitchen, chicken coop, wagon shed and other farm buildings that have been built with historical accuracy by staff members and volunteers. Visitors can tour the grounds and the farmhouse while workers dressed in period clothing explain the day's activities. Numerous 1890s-themed events are held throughout the year.

Popular seasonal activities include: Ice Harvest in January, the birth of lambs in late winter, Maple Sugaring in March, calving season in early spring, Sheep Shearing in April. Memorial Day ceremony, Fourth of July Celebration, Country Fair on Labor Day weekend, Corn Harvest in October and Christmas On the Farm in December. The farm also offers school field trips, classes in various 19th-century skills and trades, a summer kids' day camp and many other activities and demonstrations related to farm life.

Kline Creek Farm raises a variety of livestock and crops and is a working farm that does produce crops and animals for market. The farm raises Shorthorn and Angus cattle, Southdown sheep, chickens and uses draft horses to demonstrate historical methods of farming. The farm produces corn, oats and soybeans in its fields.

The Timber Ridge Visitor Center is located near the entrance to Kline Creek Farm. Visitors can browse through the gift shop, enjoy historical exhibits that provide glimpses into 1890s life on the family farm, and pick up a booklet that relates details about the farmstead. The climate-controlled environment and fully accessible facilities also make the center a perfect starting point or rest stop for trail users.

Kline Creek Farm's telephone number is (630) 876-5900.

=== Mayslake Peabody Estate ===
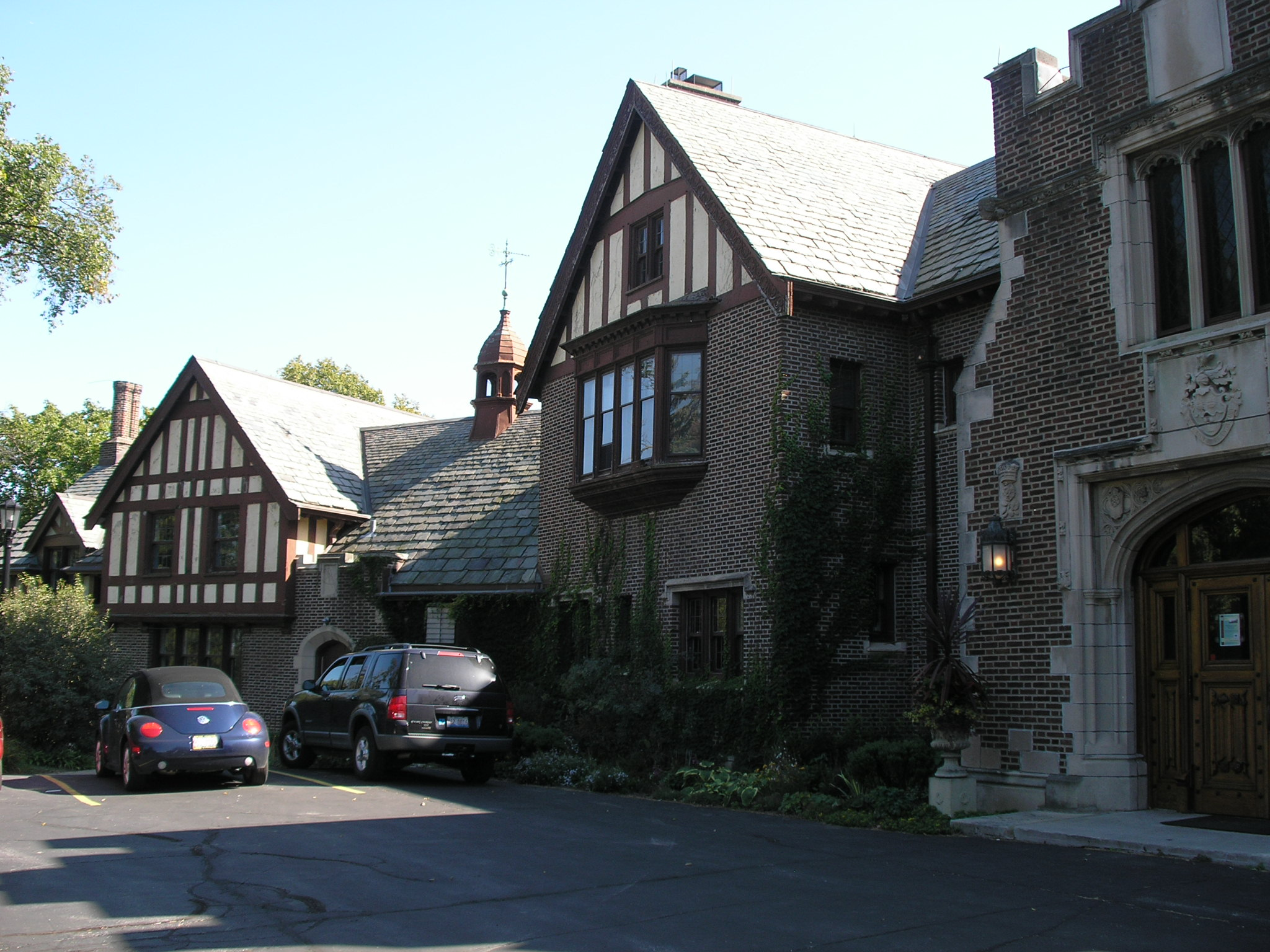
The front façade of Mayslake Hall, constructed in the Tudor Revival style in Oak Brook, Illinois

In addition to the surrounding 90-acre (360,000 m^{2}) Mayslake Forest Preserve, the Mayslake Peabody Estate in Oak Brook, Illinois, is composed of Mayslake Hall, a retreat wing, and the Portiuncula Chapel, a replica of the Chapel of St. Francis of Assisi in Assisi, Italy.

Mayslake Hall, which is listed on the National Register of Historic Places, is a 39-room Tudor Revival mansion built between 1919 and 1921 for coal baron Francis Stuyvesant Peabody. The Forest Preserve District is working to make the hall available to the public for a variety of special events, such as seminars, workshops, receptions, conferences, and school programs, and currently offers paid, guided tours. People are also able to explore at their own pace during open hours. The chapel is currently available for weddings and other special ceremonies.

=== DuPage Wildlife Conservation Center (formerly Willowbrook Wildlife Center) ===
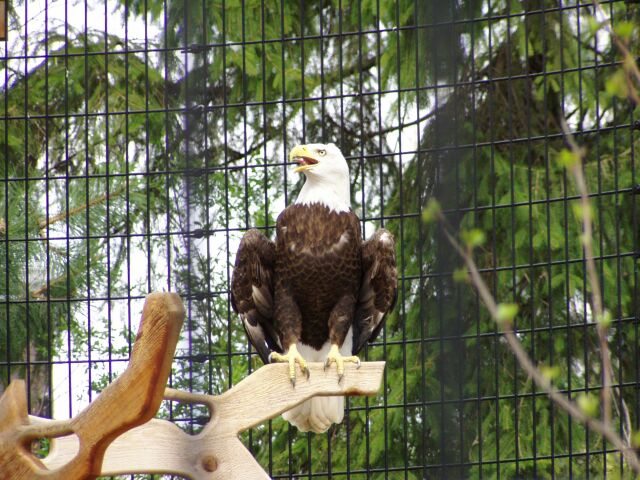
Bald eagle in rehab

In 1956, Audrie Alspaugh Chase (better known as the film critic Kitty Kelly) donated 43 acres of land in Glen Ellyn to the Forest Preserve District. She asked that the new reserve be named Willowbrook and a portion be maintained as a bird sanctuary. The name was later changed to the DuPage Wildlife Conservation Center, and it serves as the Forest Preserve District's wildlife rehabilitation and education center. The facility serves as a wildlife rehabilitation center for county wildlife that have been injured or otherwise affected by human activities. Expanded clinic and rehabilitation spaces as well as a new education center are scheduled to open in the Spring of 2025. The 0.5-mile (0.80 km) nature trail leads visitors through natural habitats of DuPage County and offers an excellent opportunity for viewing native and migratory bird species. Indoor sights include interactive exhibits and changing displays that focus on wildlife and the rehabilitation process.

== Golf ==
The District's three public golf courses, Oak Meadows, Green Meadows and Maple Meadows, offer prime locations for golfing and hold many special events.

Oak Meadows Golf Club in Addison was purchased by the District in 1985 for flood control. It has an 18-hole golf course, a pro shop and a driving range. Clubhouse and banquet facilities are available for business meetings, weddings, showers and other functions. It is widely considered the ‘Monterey of DuPage County’. Golf reservations are taken as early as one week in advance but are not required. Motorized carts are available.

Oak Meadows' 1920s Tudor-style clubhouse was severely damaged on February 26, 2009, by what is believed to be a lightning strike, which caused the roof and floors to collapse. Damage is estimated at $3 million.

Maple Meadows Golf Club in Wood Dale is a challenging 27-hole course that includes water hazards. The District purchased the course in 1990 for flood control and open green space in the northeastern part of the county.

Green Meadows Golf Course in Westmont is a nine-hole course with three par-fours and six par-threes. Reservations are not required, and golfers can play the course in about two hours. Club rentals, motor and pull carts, and refreshments are available.

== Mallard Lake County Forest Preserve ==
Mallard Lake County Forest Preserve is a 949 acres (3.8 km^{2}) forest preserve surrounding Mallard lake, located predominantly in Bloomingdale township in northern DuPage County (41°57′59″N 088°07′56″W). At 85 acres (0.3 km^{2}), Mallard lake is the largest recreational lake in the district. The preserve was started with a donation of 111 acres (0.4 km^{2}) in 1956. In 1974, the district established the Mallard Lake Landfill west of the lake.

== McDowell Grove Forest Preserve ==
The 439-acre (1.78 km^{2}) McDowell Grove Forest Preserve is located on the West Branch of the DuPage River and was the site of a Civilian Conservation Camp and a US Army Signal Corps training center. Today, it offers many recreational activities such as hiking, picnicking, fishing and boating.
