= Francis Stuyvesant Peabody House =

Historic house in Illinois, United States

- U.S. National Register of Historic Places
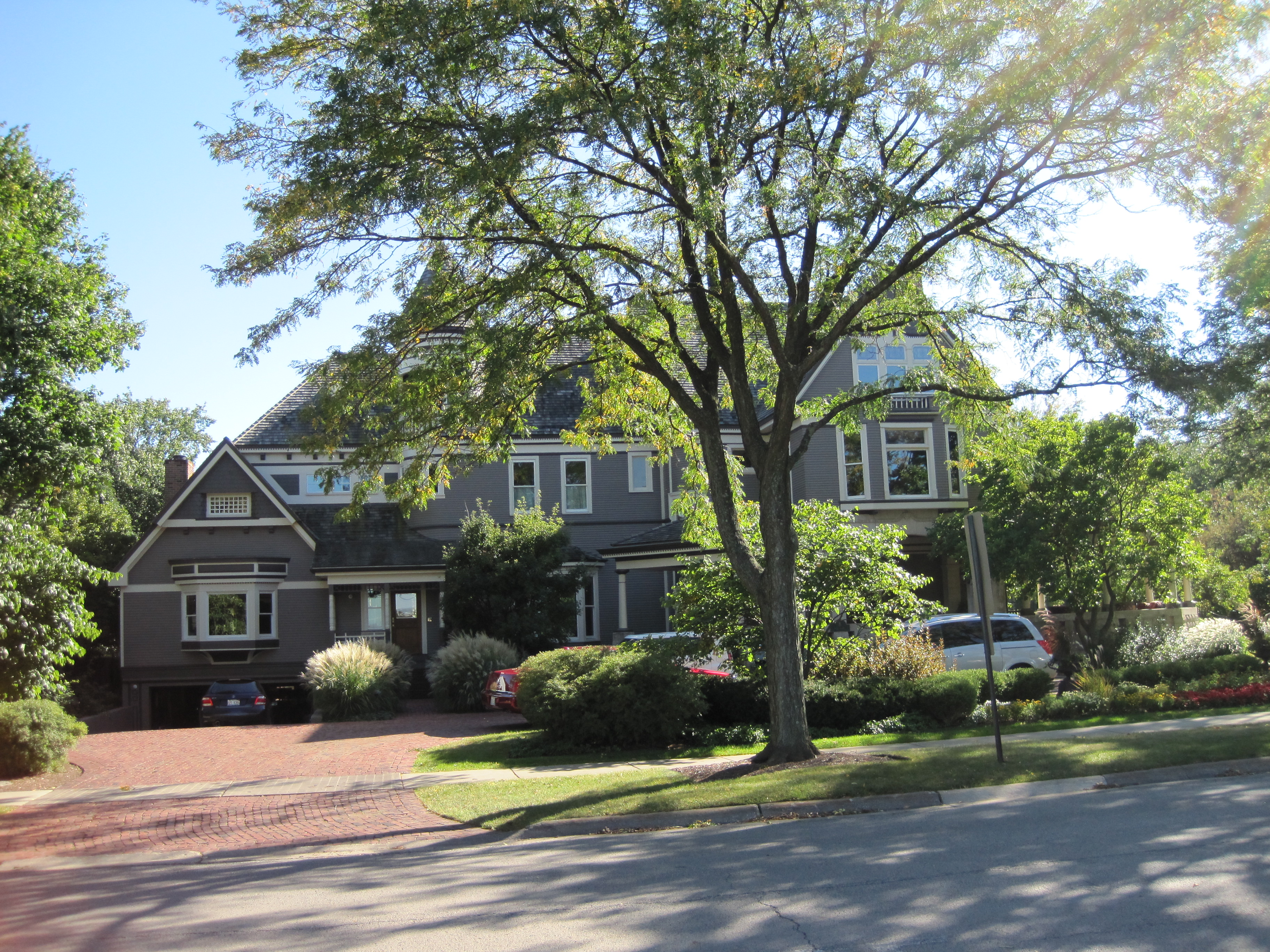

- Location within Illinois Location within the United States
- Location: 8 E. Third St. Hinsdale, DuPage County, Illinois, U.S.
- Coordinates: 41°47′59″N 87°55′44″W
- Built: 1889
- Architectural style: Queen Anne
- NRHP reference No.: 00001330
- Added to NRHP: November 8, 2000

The Francis Stuyvesant Peabody House is a historical Queen Anne–style residence in Hinsdale, Illinois, United States, most notably owned by Francis S. Peabody of Peabody Coal from 1911 to 1921.

== History ==
The home was built in 1889 and was purchased by Francis Stuyvesant Peabody in 1911. Peabody was the founder of Peabody, Daniels & Company, which bought coal from mines and sold it to Chicago area homes and businesses. In 1903, his company forged a deal with the Chicago Edison Company to be the main supplier of coal for local power plants. Coal demand for these plants skyrocketed, and by 1920, Peabody's company supplied over 2.3 million tons of coal per year. Peabody was also associated with the Democratic Party and was considered for the Vice President of the United States in 1912. He stepped down as company president in favor of his son Stuyvesant in 1919 and served as chairman of the board until his death in 1922.

Peabody's second wife, Mary Gertrude Sullivan, was originally a resident of Hinsdale and was a possible influence on Peabody's decision to reside there. Peabody lived in 15 different houses during his career, but was most associated with his Hinsdale residence. The south side of the home was probably extended while the Peabodys lived there. The Peabodys moved into the Mayslake Peabody Estate in 1921.

== Architecture ==
The house is on the southwest corner of Third and Washington Streets in a residential district. The house immediately to the east is thought to be formerly associated with the Peabody property, perhaps a barn or garage. The main facade faces north toward Third Street. The exterior is largely covered in narrow clapboards painted light tan. The two stories of the house are divided on the exterior with a thin line of dark tan molding. It is built on an ashlar limestone foundation, painted off-white. The original house was built in 1889 and consisted of what is now the parlor, tower, front hall, and part of the kitchen, library, and dining room. There were significant additions around 1897, where the southern and western ends of the house were extended. Furthermore, the wood deck was replaced with limestone, a third floor dormer window was added to the tower, a room was added on the second and this floors above the main porch, a porte-cochere was added to the east of the porch, and a new hexagonal porch was added to the northwest corner. A second wave of additions occurred some time between 1909 and 1919 and probably occurred shortly after it was purchased by Peabody. The south side was again extended. Modern additions occurred in 1940 and c. 1980.
