= Graue Mill =

- Graue Mill in
- U.S. National Register of Historic Places
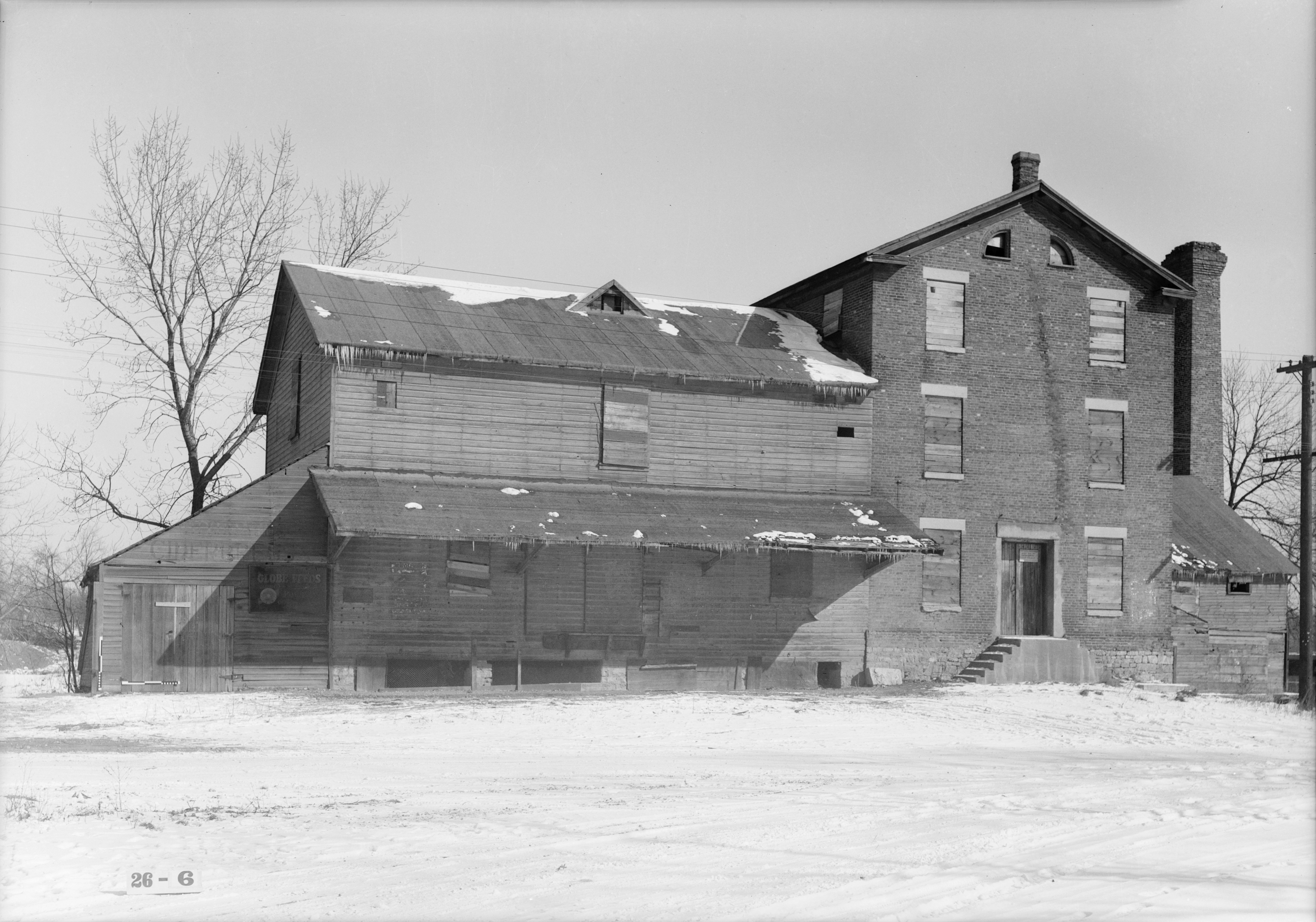
- Graue Water Mill

- Location within Illinois Location within the United States
- Location: NW of jct. of Spring and York Rds., Oak Brook, Illinois
- Coordinates: 41°49′12″N 87°55′39.5″W
- Built: 1852
- Architect: Graue, Frederick
- NRHP reference No.: 75002077
- Added to NRHP: May 12, 1975

The Graue Mill is a water-powered grist mill that was originally erected in 1852. Now a museum, it is one of two operating water-powered gristmills in Illinois (the other is the Franklin Creek Grist Mill). It is located on Salt Creek in Oak Brook, Illinois, owned and operated by the Forest Preserve District of DuPage County.

== History ==
Friedrich Graue, born in Germany, emigrated to the United States in the late 1840s. Changing his name to 'Frederick', he brought with him knowledge of the craft of waterwheel gristmilling. Settling in what was the farming village and early transportation hub of Fullersburg, Illinois, formerly named Brush Hill, he and William Asche (whose brother-in-law, Henry Fischer, built a wind-powered grist mill in what is now Mount Emblem Cemetery) filed claim in 1849 to a tract of damp, clay-rich bottomland along the banks of Salt Creek that was home to a sawmill that burned down the year before. Together they built a new sawmill. They together operated this mill for three years, until Graue decided to engage in the milling business on his own.

Digging ditches in the poorly drained soil, he and his family recovered clay that could be used to make bricks. The Graues built a kiln on their farmstead, fired the bricks, and slowly raised the new structure and waterwheel into place from the on-site building materials. The mill went into operation in the summer of 1852.

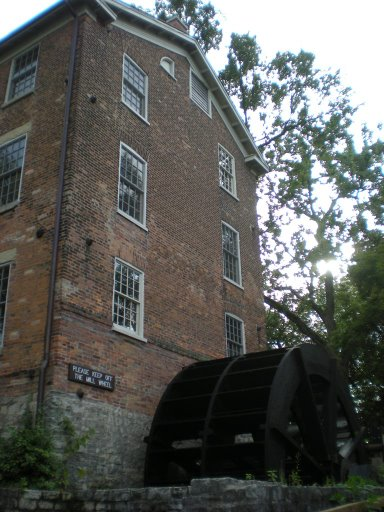
The wheel

The ditching and draining of the Graue Mill farmstead was typical of German-American settlement patterns in the Midwest in the 1840s and 1850s, as the thrifty German emigrants found assets in tracts of land that had been left behind by earlier, English-speaking frontiersmen and women.

Graue could not build his entire mill from onsite materials. He bought four buhrstones that turned on water-driven axles to grind locally grown corn and wheat. Quarried in France, the buhrstones, a type of millstone, were carefully dressed by specially trained craftsmen so as to form two level, gritty surfaces that would pulverize the grain between them.

Graue and his family were Pietist Germans who opposed American slavery. The mill is one of three Illinois stops on the Underground Railroad, the subversive movement that helped fugitive slaves escape from the American South to Canada.

== Today ==
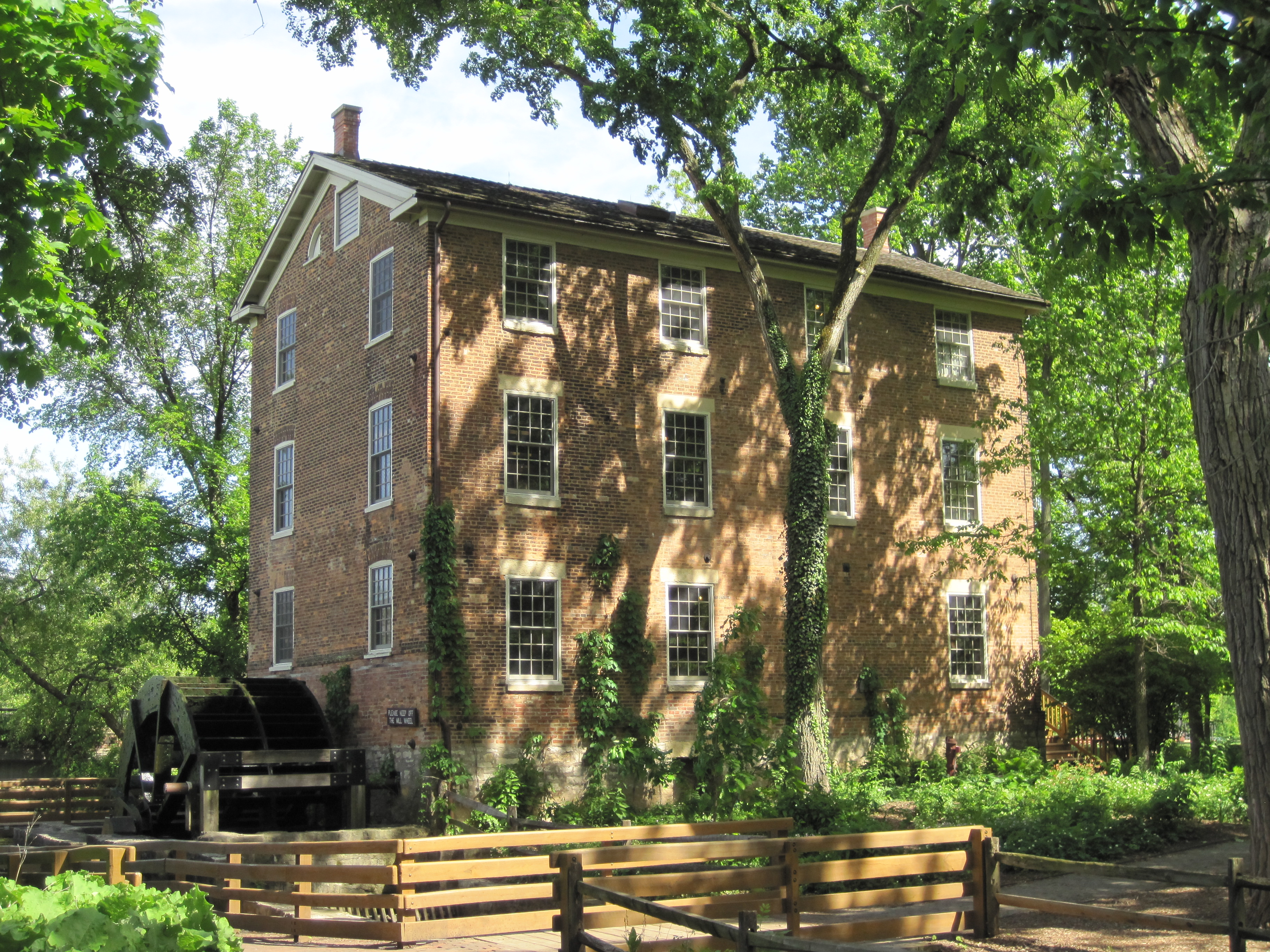
The mill still operates as a gristmill, although the machinery is not connected to the wheel in the millrace.

The Graue Mill operated in eastern DuPage County under three generations of the Graue family for approximately 60 years. In the 1910s, advances in milling technology, particularly the invention of steel rolling mills, drove the old mill out of business. The derelict mill was restored by the Civilian Conservation Corps in 1934–1943, and was opened to the public as a working historic site in 1951.

As DuPage County became urbanized in the second half of the 20th century, the mill's surroundings lost their agricultural context. The mill building itself, however, was honored as a survivor from Illinois post-frontier years. The Graue Mill was listed on the National Register of Historic Places in 1975, and was recognized as a Historic Mechanical Engineering Landmark in 1981. The mill has been periodically re-restored since 1943 to keep it in operating condition, including work completed in 2002.

The Graue Mill is located at 3800 S. York Road, on the banks of Salt Creek in Oak Brook, Illinois, and is surrounded by Fullersburg woods. It is currently open to the public; check the Graue Mill and Museum website for dates and times of operation.

The Graue Mill is also nearby to Salt Creek Trail, a trail that follows the path of Salt Creek from Itasca to Brookfield.

Recognizing the water quality and habitat impairments caused by run of the river dams, the DuPage River Salt Creek Workgroup and Forest Preserve District of DuPage County retained Hey to complete design and permitting necessary to implement the Master Plan for Salt Creek at Fullersburg Woods. The project includes removing a 6’ tall by 120’ wide dam in its entirety and restoring 1.5 miles of riffles, pools, and floodplain wetlands. Additional project enhancements include motorizing the Graue Mill water wheel (grinding stones in the mill will continue to be powered by an existing electric motor), a pump system to provide water in the mill’s sluiceway, waterproofing a floodwall near the Fullersburg Nature Center, and several scenic overlooks. An improved trail connection below the York Road bridge over Salt Creek and canoe/kayak launch was also designed for a related project.

Dam removal was completed in December 2023, and ecological restoration work is on track to be completed by the end of 2024.
