= Kitty Kelly (film critic) =

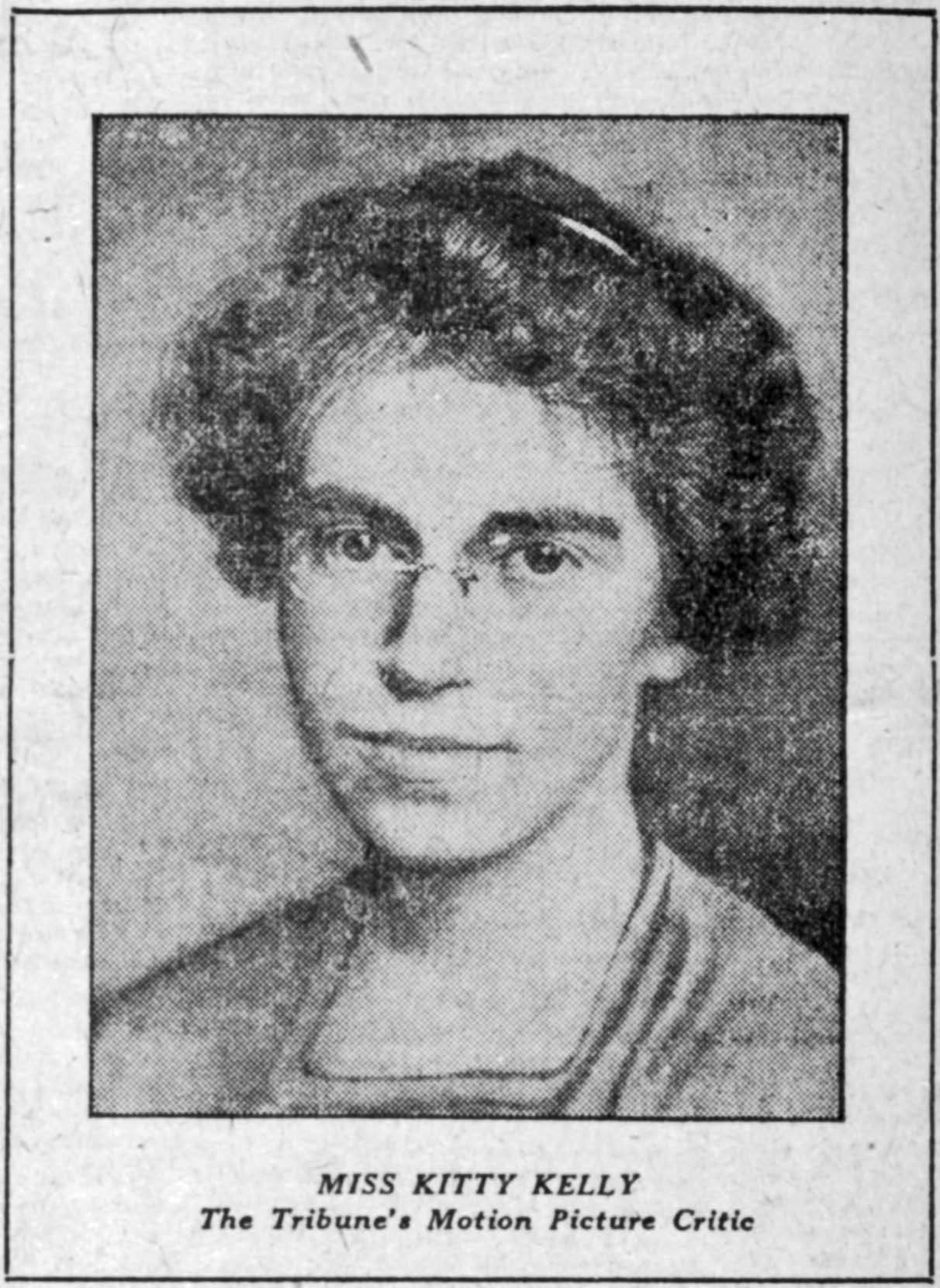
- Journalist and Film Critic
- Born: 24 October 1886; Kansas, United States
- Died: 19 November 1965 (aged 79); San Antonio, Texas, United States
- Other name: Audrie Alspaugh Chase
- Occupations: Journalist and film critic
- Spouse: Albert W. "Al" Chase

Audrie Alspaugh Chase (24 October 1886 – 19 November 1965), better known by the pen name of Kitty Kelly, was an American journalist and pioneering film critic. Her work for the Chicago Tribune and Chicago Examiner helped establish film criticism as a serious form of journalism during the silent-movie era. She developed an analytical approach that encouraged audiences to evaluate films not only for acting and characterization but also for narrative structure, atmosphere, and editing.

== Early life and education ==
Raised in the small town of Chase, Iowa, Kelly attended the University of Iowa where she graduated Phi Beta Kappa in 1909. While at the university, she majored in English and was a member of the campus's prestigious Readers' Club and Writers' Club.

== Career ==
Kelly joined the Chicago Tribune in 1911 as a book reviewer. In July 1914, she began writing the Tribune's daily film-review column “Today’s Best Photo Play Stories.” This is where she first began using the pseudonym Kitty Kelly. Soon afterward, she renamed the column “Flickerings from Filmland.” During this time, there was rapid growth in the motion picture industry and increasing public interest in films. Cultural historian Richard Abel describes Kelly's writing style as exuberant and characterized by a love of language. Rather than simply summarizing plots, Kelly treated films as works worthy of discussion and evaluation.

As Kelly's columns grew in popularity, so did her impact on the motion picture industry. It was said she "could make or break a picture in the Middle West." Because of this, she gained influence in the film world. In April 1916, the Tribune took the then unusual step of promoting her column in a half-page advertisement. However, in October of the same year Kelly left the newspaper. In 1917, her "Flickerings from Filmland" column began running in the rival Chicago Examiner newspaper.

In mid-1918, the Chicago Examiner and Chicago Herald merged, becoming the Chicago Herald and Examiner. Kelly's film criticism continued in the Chicago Herald and Examiner through at least April 1919.

=== Opposition to film censorship ===
While at the Tribune, Kelly closed her columns with lists of material that Chicago censors had ordered removed from films before they were released to local movie theaters. Historian R. J. Haberski wrote that she "noted the curious results produced by censors cutting scenes from completed movies. Audiences would sit bewildered by gaps in story lines and inelegant jumps between cinematic moments." In a statement she gave at the 1920 meeting of the Chicago Motion Picture Commission, she opposed censorship and presented the idea of an organization that would instead rate films according to their adult content.

== Personal life ==
During her time on the Chicago Tribune, Kelly was active in the city's social scene. In 1915, she served as a charter member of the Cordon Club, a social club for women in the arts.

On October 30, 1915, Kelly married Albert W. "Al" Chase (7 January 1880 – 20 January 1956), longtime real estate editor at the Chicago Times. They remained married until his death in 1956 at age 76. That same year, Kelly donated 43 acres (17 hectares) of land in Glen Ellyn, Illinois, to the Forest Preserve District of DuPage County for preservation. Formerly used by the couple as their summer retreat, she requested the new reserve be named Willowbrook and a portion be maintained as a bird sanctuary.

== Death ==
Kelly died of cancer in her San Antonio, Texas home on November 19, 1965, at the age of 79. Her obituary in the Reading Eagle described her as the "first movie critic."

== Published works ==
Harmon, Ada Douglas. (1928). The Story of an Old Town - Glen Ellyn. (A. A. Chase, Ed.) Glen Ellyn, Ill., Glen News Printing Company
