= Forchess =

Four player chess variant

Position: a8 black king, b8 black rook, c8 black knight, d8 black pawn, e8 p g, f8 b g, g8 r g, h8 k g, a7 black rook, b7 black queen, c7 black bishop, d7 black pawn, e7 p g, f7 n g, g7 q g, h7 r g, a6 black bishop, b6 black knight, d6 black pawn, e6 p g, g6 b g, h6 n g, a5 black pawn, b5 black pawn, c5 black pawn, d5 black pawn, e5 p g, f5 p g, g5 p g, h5 p g, a4 p b, b4 p b, c4 p b, d4 p b, e4 p r, f4 p r, g4 p r, h4 p r, a3 n b, b3 b b, d3 p b, e3 p r, g3 n r, h3 b r, a2 r b, b2 q b, c2 n b, d2 p b, e2 p r, f2 b r, g2 q r, h2 r r, a1 k b, b1 r b, c1 b b, d1 p b, e1 p r, f1 n r, g1 r r, h1 k r
Forchess starting position
- Players: 4
- Setup time: 2 minutes
- Playing time: 30-90 minutes
- Chance: None
- Age range: any
- Skills: Chess strategy

Forchess is a four-player chess variant developed by T. K. Rogers, an American engineer. It uses one standard chessboard and two sets of standard pieces.

== History and motivation ==
Forchess was developed around the year 1975. Its inventor T. K. Rogers wanted to create a pure strategy game with the social dynamic of card games like Bridge. Rogers believed in the educational merits of chess and felt that making the game a more popular social activity would benefit society.

Rogers wanted the game to use only standard pieces and a standard board so that everything necessary to play would be readily available. He also did not want to severely limit the number of pieces each player had.

In 1992, Rogers published the instruction set as a 64-page booklet Forchess: The Ultimate Social Game, designed to fit in a shirt pocket. The booklet also contained strategies for playing the game and a new technique invented by Rogers for analyzing both chess and Forchess games. He called it influence indicator.

In 1996, Rogers posted a free instruction set on the then newly founded Intuitor website. He simultaneously began distributing thousands of free instruction brochures to schools and colleges.

== Overview of the game ==
The game is played by four people in teams of two. At the outset, each player controls an entire quadrant of the board with a full set of chess pieces (minus one pawn). Partners occupy quadrants diagonally across from each other. The diagram at right shows the initial layout of the Forchess board. Four squares are initially unoccupied.

All the pieces move and capture in the same manner as conventional chess, except the pawn, which moves diagonally and captures laterally. A pawn may not move two squares at a time, and there is no en passant capture. There are no checkmates and no stalemates: kings are captured like all other pieces. When a player is in check and has no legal moves to escape check, he may make a "token move" every turn until his king is actually captured. When a player loses his king, his remaining pieces subsequently become the captor's. The game ends when one team has lost both kings or chooses to concede.

Partners typically coordinate their moves as part of a single strategy. Thus, communication of that strategy becomes a requirement of the game. Clandestine forms of communication such as code words, furtive gestures, or secret notes are not allowed, except in special variants. All strategizing between partners must be done openly in front of their opponents. This rule lends Forchess much of its social character.

== Cutthroat Forchess ==
Forchess has a variant called Cutthroat, in which there are no partners and only one player wins by defeating all three opponents. Successful strategy in Cutthroat Forchess can differ greatly from "regular" Forchess, as fluid alliances may spark a game of psychological manipulation. In this respect, Cutthroat shares strategy elements with the board game Risk.
