= Mount Emblem Cemetery =

Cemetery in Elmhurst, Illinois, U.S.

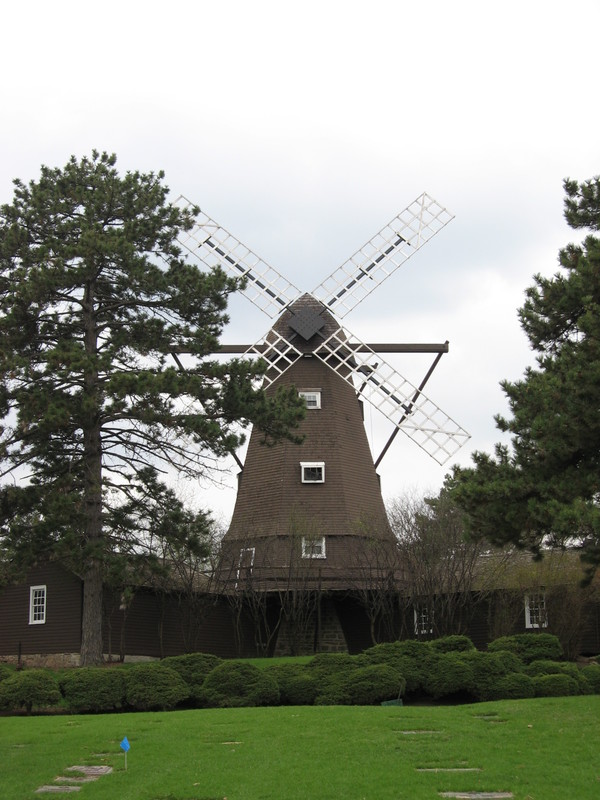
- The Fischer Windmill at Mount Emblem Cemetery
- Interactive map of Mount Emblem Cemetery

Details
- Established: 1925
- Location: Elmhurst, Illinois
- Country: United States
- Coordinates: 41°55′43″N 87°55′33″W
- Type: Non-denominational
- Owned by: Dignity Memorial
- Size: 90 acres (0.36 km^{2})
- Website: Mount Emblem Cemetery website
- Find a Grave: Mount Emblem Cemetery

Mount Emblem Cemetery is located at the intersection of Grand Avenue and County Line Road in Elmhurst, Illinois.

Mount Emblem is perhaps best known as the home of the Fischer Windmill, popularly known as "The Old Dutch Mill", a typical Dutch windmill that towers above the trees and can be clearly seen from southbound I-294. Construction started on the mill in 1865, and the land became a cemetery in 1925, with the windmill becoming a museum. The latest renovations to the windmill were made in 2015. The tower is 51 feet (16 m) high. Sails were originally mounted on a latticework that spanned 74 feet (23 m), but now spans only 50 feet (15 m).

== History of the area ==
Henry Frederick Fischer began windmill construction in 1865 after acquiring the farmland from his father, Frederick L. Fischer (as an interesting side note, Henry’s brothers-in-law, William Asche and Frederick Graue, bought an old water-powered sawmill site years before. They first built a sawmill, then a brick gristmill, now known as the Graue Mill). The typical Dutch smock windmill was among the first of its kind to be built in the Chicago area. Fischer built the mill with parts from a prefabricated kit imported from the Netherlands that was assembled with the help of two Dutch millwrights and local farmers, including Christian Heidemann, whose own windmill (that was in Addison, Illinois until it burned down in 1958) was based on Fischer’s design. During construction, it is believed that alterations were made to the mill’s height and design which probably caused its construction to span three years. The mill began grinding in 1867.

Just ten years after opening, Fischer sold the mill and 10 acres (40,000 m^{2}) to Edward Ehlers for $10,000. Fischer moved his family to Oregon where, three years later, he sold another twenty-one acres to Ehlers. Competition from other area mills and a steady decline in wheat farming in Illinois began to hurt Ehlers’ “Addison Mills”.

Caroline, the widow of Edward Ehlers (and daughter of Henry Korthauer, one of the original mill builders), sold the farm and the windmill to the Mount Emblem Cemetery Association for $10,000 in 1925. The association planned to convert the land into a cemetery. Although the windmill and farm buildings were scheduled for demolition, the association instead hired Henry and Franklyn Ehlers, Edward’s sons, to preserve the mill as a museum. They rebuilt the sails, installed new shingles and trim on the exterior, painted the mill, and purposely dismantled some of the inner gearing to better show their use. The sails were turned to an ‘X’ formation, which traditionally means the mill is in “a long rest period”. They also turned the cap to the northeast toward the cemetery’s entrance. A barn, the only other structure that survived demolition, was home to the groundskeeper, but was recently destroyed.

== Cemetery design ==
The administration building, along with the cemetery’s entrance gates and bridges, were designed to resemble English architecture of the 1860s, supposedly to “match” the styles used when the windmill was built; however, these copper and stone English structures only contrast with the Dutch woodwork of the mill. Since the cemetery's dedication in June 1936, the mill plays music on Sundays and holidays from loudspeakers in the third floor windows. It took eleven years for the architects of Simonds, West, & Blair to transform 75 acres (of what is now over 90 acres) of flat farmland into a picturesque, tranquil scene with tens of thousands of new trees and shrubs as well as the creation of Lake Emblem. Over the years, the Fischer Windmill became an historical local icon and the subject of artists’ paintings. In 1956 Mount Emblem was awarded for its preservation of the mill as a public service by the DuPage County Historical Society.

The cemetery itself opened as a Masonic Cemetery. It was heavily advertised in local newspapers as "Illinois' Most Beautiful Cemetery; Without the Gates of the City." One of the other emblems of the cemetery is a monument of three pillars, symbolizing Faith, Hope, and Charity, located at the far west end. In later years, a mausoleum was constructed.

Most of the sections in the cemetery are crudely named for letters of the alphabet, but special sections are formally named. The "Garden of Eden" is that area directly in front of the windmill leading up to Lake Emblem, surrounded on either side by lilac bushes. The "Veneration" and "Twilight" sections are home to most of the monument graves. "Reverence" has the Veteran's Garden. "Eventide" is home to the mausoleum, lawn crypt, and eternal flame feature.

== Current developments ==
Land to the south of the cemetery grounds, once thought to be used for expansion, was sold in 2005 for the construction of a factory. Around the same time, the association hired landscape architects to rebuild the deteriorating shores of the creek and Lake Emblem. New trees have also been planted throughout the land.

Over the years, the windmill fell victim to "tail-winding," where the wind blows against the back of the mill, causing great damage to the sails and cap. New, smaller, lightweight sails have been bolted to the mill's cap, designed to allow the wind to pass through (rather than turn) the mill; however, the deteriorating structure was closed to the public in the early 1990s.

In April 2015, major renovations to the windmill began. Though not restored to operating condition, worked replaced the rotting shingles, stage, beams, and floorboards. Workers also demolished the north and east wings to strengthen the foundation and stone base of the tower. Renovations completed in October 2015 and the mill was rededicated on November 7, 2015.

== Sources ==
- Illinois Windmills by Tom Haskell, retrieved May 2006
- Vierling, Philip E. "The Fischer Windmill" Chicago: Illinois Country Outdoor Guides, 1994.
- Pirola, Louis. Historic American Buildings Survey. Heideman Mill, Addison IL. Chicago: HABS, 1934.
- “Windward ho!” Addison Press. 26 June 1998.
- DuPage County Clerk land and tax records, 1850–1926
- Advertisement. Cook County Herald. 2 November 1926
- 1874 Combination Atlas of DuPage County
- photographs of the Bensenville Public Library
- photographs of the Elmhurst Historical Society
- oral history of Ernestine Ehlers Hackmeister
- map of Mount Emblem Cemetery
- personal records / observations
