= Francis S. Peabody =

American businessman

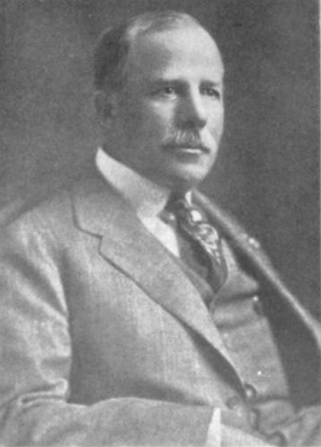
- Born: Francis Stuyvesant Peabody; July 24, 1859; Chicago, Illinois
- Died: August 27, 1922 (aged 63); Hinsdale, Illinois
- Resting place: Queen of Heaven Cemetery
- Education: Yale University
- Occupation: Businessman
- Political party: Democratic
- Spouses: May Henderson (m. 1887; died 1907) Mary Gertrude Sullivan (m. 1909)

Francis Stuyvesant Peabody (July 24, 1859 – August 27, 1922) was an American businessman who founded Peabody Coal, and became a wealthy coal baron.

== Biography ==
Peabody was born in Chicago, Illinois, on July 24, 1859. His father was a prominent Chicago attorney, Francis Peabody graduated from Yale University intending to follow in his father's footsteps. But, after trying the law he switched to working in a bank. Working there provided him with an opportunity to recognize a business advantage.

With just $100.00 he founded the Peabody, Daniels & Company, at age 24 in 1883, in Chicago. Peabody Coal started out as a retail coal vendor, buying coal and re-selling it to retail consumers to use in their homes and businesses. Peabody married May Henderson on November 23, 1887. He bought out his business partner in 1889, and incorporated the Peabody Coal Company in the state of Illinois in 1890. In 1894, Peabody ran unsuccessfully for Sheriff of Chicago. By 1905, Peabody was the president and director of ten companies. May Peabody died in 1907 after bearing one son and two years later, Peabody married Mary Gertrude Sullivan. The Peabodys moved to the Francis Stuyvesant Peabody House in Hinsdale, Illinois, in 1911.

An important political ally of Adlai E. Stevenson I, Peabody was considered as the vice presidential candidate of the Democratic Party in 1912. During World War I, Peabody was the chairman of the Coal Production Committee of the Council of National Defense and was assistant to the director of the Bureau of Mines. In 1919, Peabody stepped down as president of the company at the age of 60 in favor of his son Stuyvesant. By 1920 Peabody Coal Company was one of the largest coal companies in the United States. Peabody Coal is now Peabody Energy, currently the largest private-sector coal company in the world.

A long-time member and president of Hinsdale Golf Club, Peabody spearheaded the creation of the Chicago District Golf Association. His primary vision was for a local governing body that was focused on caddy welfare and conducting amateur golf tournaments throughout the Midwest.

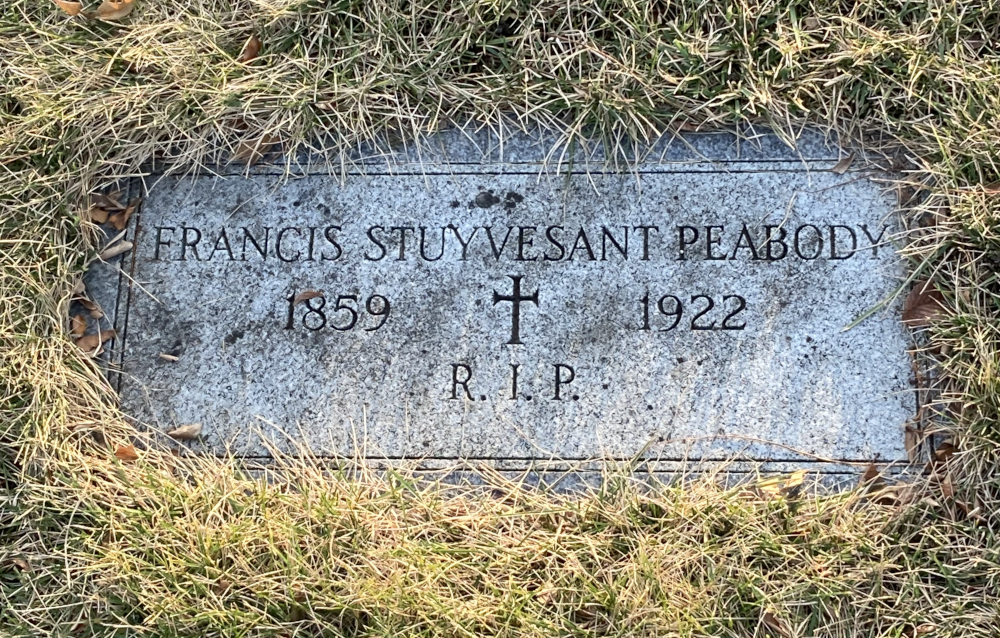
Peabody's grave at Queen of Heaven Cemetery

He constructed the Mayslake Peabody Estate in Oak Brook, Illinois. The property is listed on the National Register of Historic Places. Only a year after Mayslake Hall was completed, Francis Peabody died of a heart attack during a fox hunt on his property. He was 63. Peabody had amassed a personal fortune of $35 million and a business fortune of $75 million.

He was buried at his estate in Oak Brook. His body was reinterred at Queen of Heaven Cemetery in Hillside in 1992.

About four years after his death, Peabody's family erected the Portiuncula Chapel on the Mayslake Estate in his honor. A plaque on the side of the chapel says that it is "a replica of the chapel in Italy where St. Francis of Assisi received the call to serve God's poor in 1208."

== Thoroughbred racing ==
In 1919 Francis Peabody began purchasing racehorses for the purpose of creating a stable of runners to compete in the sport of Thoroughbred racing. Although he had only been involved in racing for a few years he had an impact and his son, Stuyvesant Peabody, would continue the racing stable and eventually became President of the Lincoln Fields Jockey Club, owners of Lincoln Fields Race Track.

The Francis S. Peabody Memorial Handicap was created in his honor at Washington Park Race Track with the inaugural running on June 29, 1929.
