= Intuitor =

Website promoting creative learning

- Founded: 1996
- Creator: T.K. Rogers
- Website: www.intuitor.com

Intuitor is a website created by T.K. Rogers, an American engineer, with the goal of promoting creative learning. Created in 1996, its first features were instructions for the founder's own four-handed chess variant Forchess.

Intuitor's most well-known feature is Insultingly Stupid Movie Physics (ISMP), which produces original scientific critiques of contemporary cinema and television. Its main gimmick is a physics rating system parodying the explicit content ratings of the Motion Picture Association of America. Its movie reviews seek to promote a greater understanding of and appreciation for science by lampooning scientific portrayals in pop-culture. It has been cited on popular websites such as Fark and Slashdot, on radio programs throughout the U.S. and Canada, and in major print media. The ISMP was also Something Awful's awful link of the day on June 14, 2006. In calling for "Decency in Movie Physics", ISMP has named the science-fiction film The Core as the "Worst Physics Movie Ever".
