= Mayslake Peabody Estate =

Historic house in Illinois, United States

- U.S. National Register of Historic Places
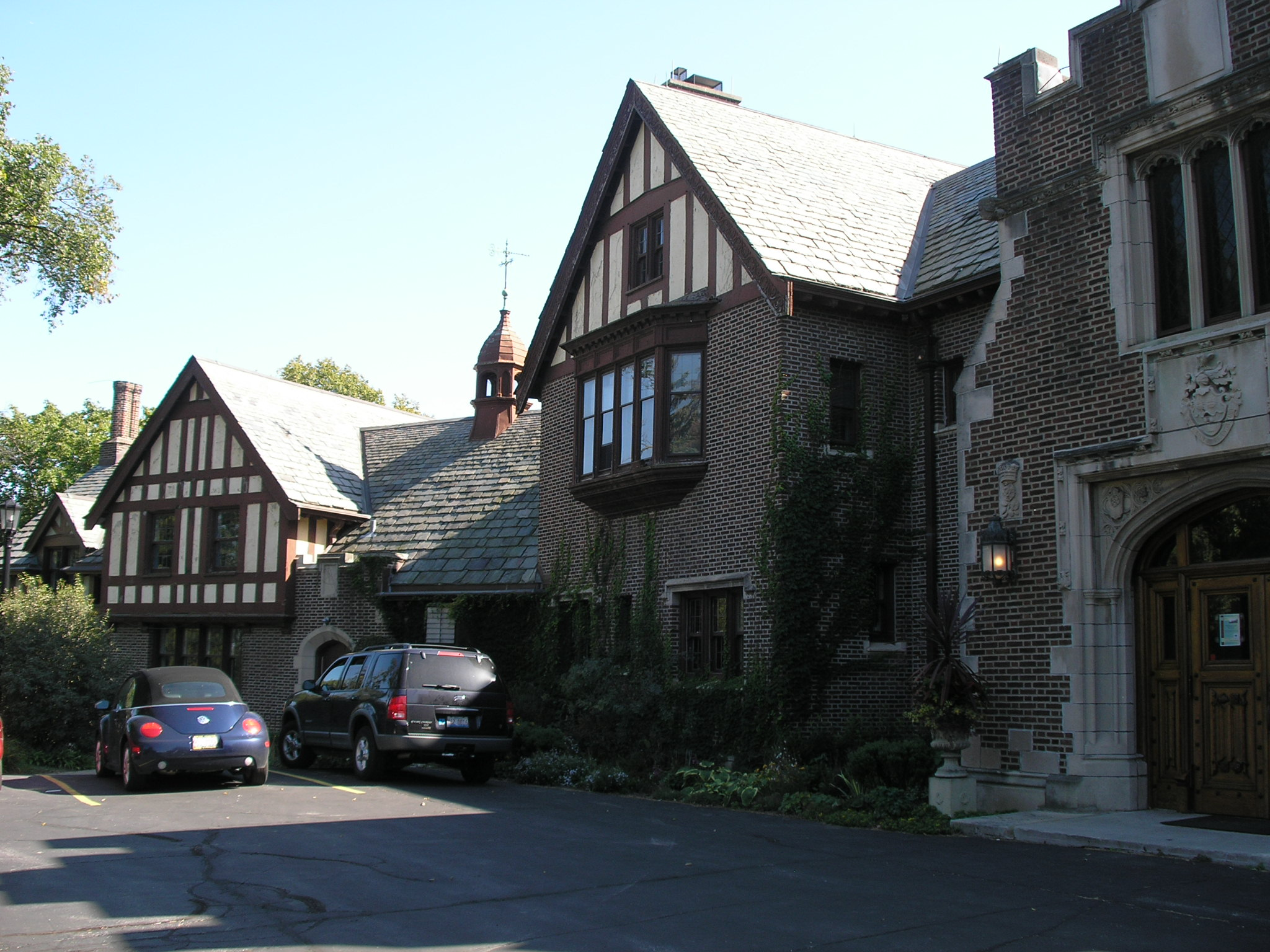
- The front façade of Mayslake Hall, constructed in the Tudor Revival style in Oak Brook, Illinois
- Nearest city: Oak Brook, Illinois
- Coordinates: 41°49′42″N 87°57′38″W
- Area: 87 acres (35 ha)
- Built: 1919–1921
- Architect: Benjamin H. Marshall from Marshall and Fox
- Architectural style: Tudor Revival
- NRHP reference No.: 93000836
- Added to NRHP: November 8, 1994

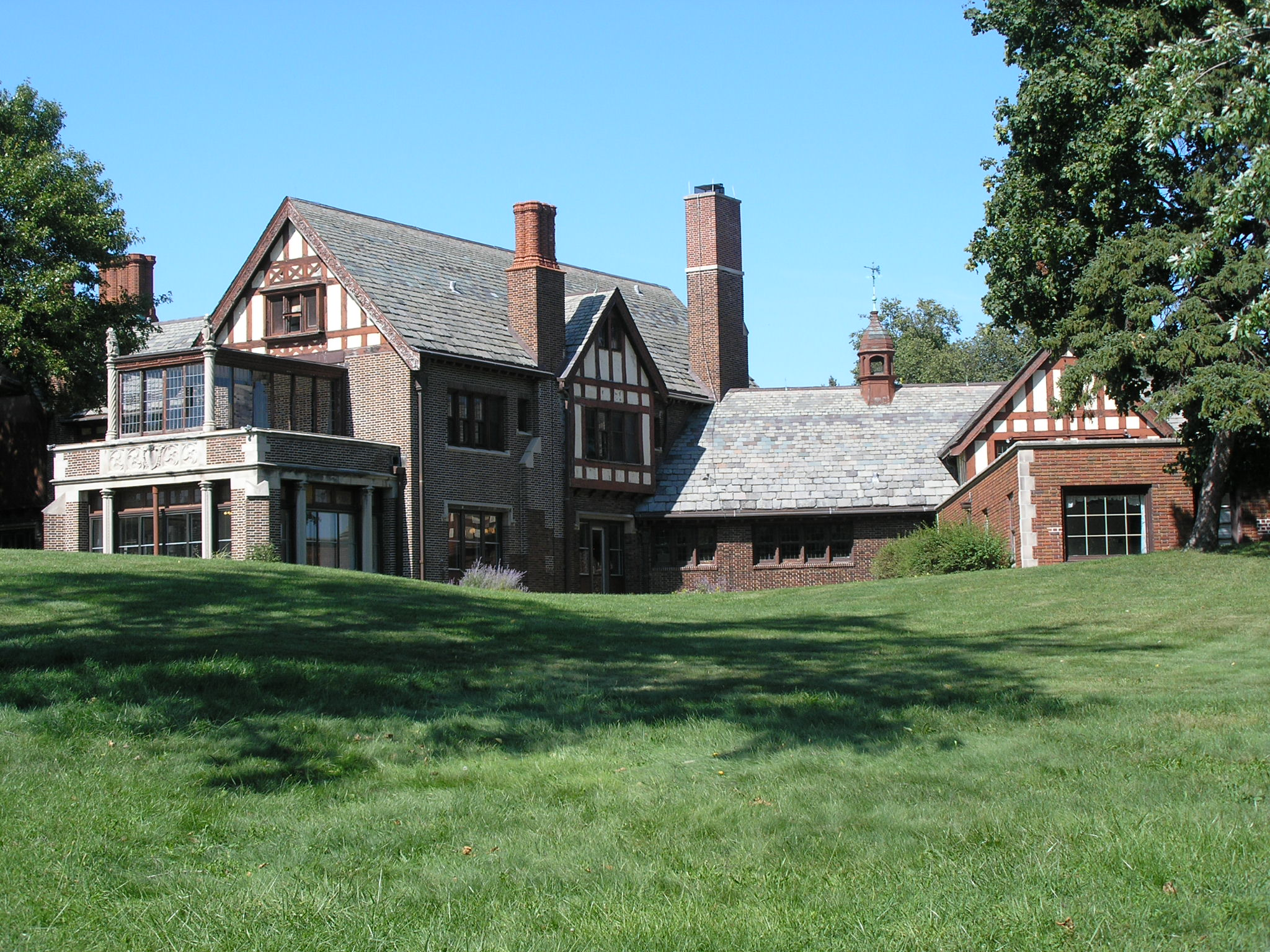
The rear façade of Mayslake Hall

The Mayslake Peabody Estate is an estate constructed as a country home for Francis Stuyvesant Peabody between 1919 and 1922. The estate is located in the western Chicago suburb of Oak Brook, Illinois, United States, and is now part of the Mayslake Forest Preserve administered by the Forest Preserve District of DuPage County.

Originally encompassing an area of over 848 acres (343 ha), the estate now contains a total area of 87 acres (35 ha). The entire complex features the Tudor Revival style Mayslake Hall, its retreat wing, and the Portiuncula Chapel, a replica of the Chapel of St. Francis in Assisi, Italy. Approximately 22 acres (8.9 ha) of wetlands, lakes, restored prairies and two small oak savannas are included within the 87-acre territory.

On November 8, 1994, Mayslake Hall was listed on the National Register of Historic Places.

== History ==
=== Construction and early ownership ===
The Mayslake Peabody Estate was constructed from 1919 to 1921 for wealthy coal baron and Democratic politician Francis Stuyvesant Peabody. At the time of the estate's construction, Peabody was the owner of one of the largest coal companies in the United States, the Peabody Coal Company, which has since become Peabody Energy, the largest private sector coal company in the world.

Peabody first began purchasing land in the eastern portion of DuPage County in 1910. He used the land to create Peabody Farms, later renamed Mayslake Farms. By 1919 Peabody had approximately 848 acres (3.43 km^{2}) of land for use between parcels he owned and leased. Construction of Mayslake Hall, his Tudor Revival style country house began in 1919. The estate is named in honor of his first wife, who died in 1907, and his daughter, both of whom were named May.

Only a year after Mayslake Hall was completed, on August 27, 1922, Francis Peabody died of a heart attack during a fox hunt on his property. Peabody was 63 years old at the time of his death.

=== Later ownership and additions ===
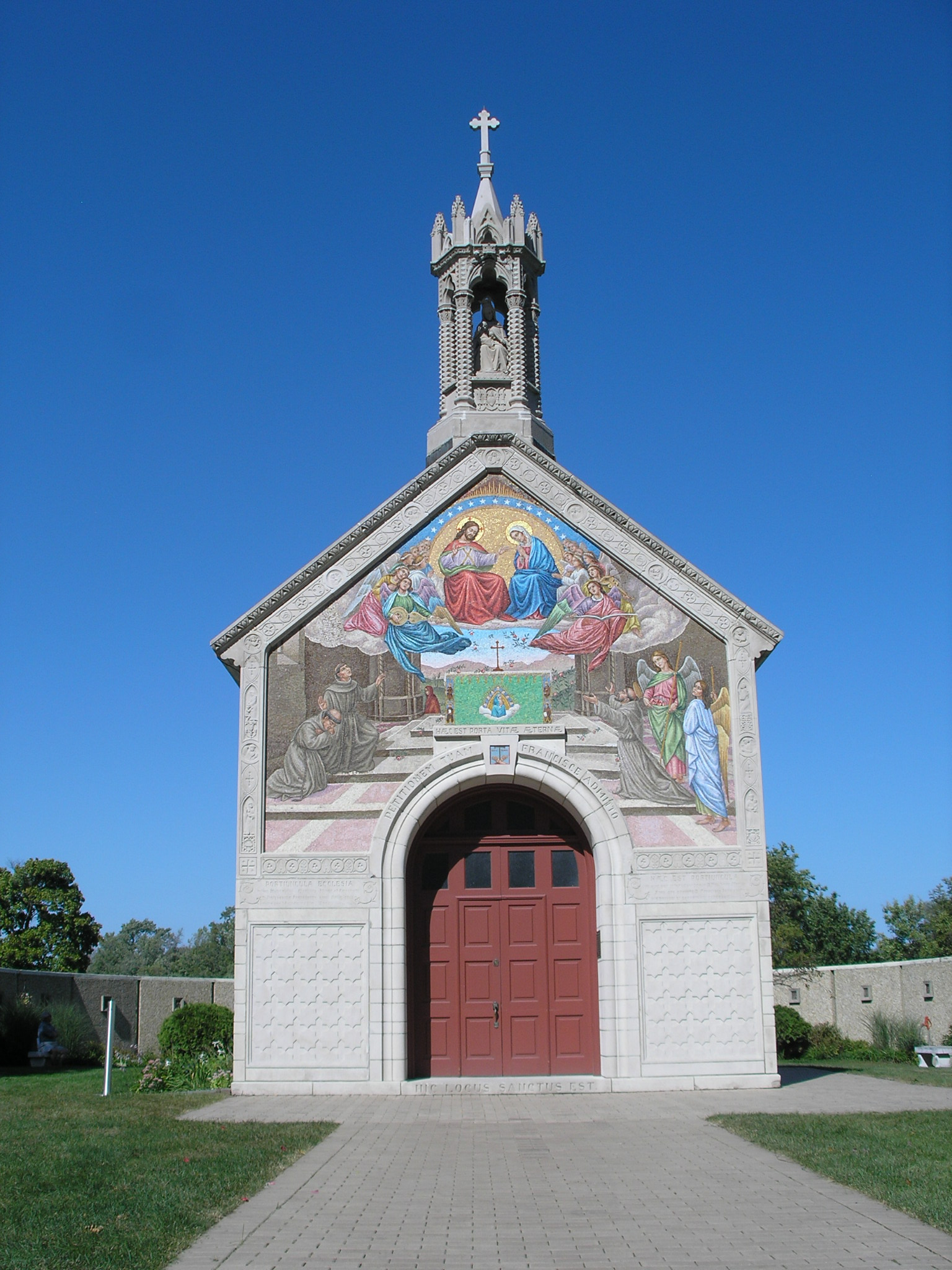
The Portiuncula Chapel, constructed in 1926, is a replica of the Chapel of St. Francis of Assisi in Assisi, Italy.

After Francis Peabody's death, his family did not wish to reside at the estate, and on March 28, 1924, the estate was sold to the Franciscan Order for a total of $450,000. Beginning in 1925, the Franciscans used Mayslake Hall as a retreat house. After Peabody's death, the Portiuncula Chapel, a replica of the Chapel of St. Francis of Assisi in Assisi, Italy, was added to the property in memory of him. Completed in 1926, the chapel was one of the first replicas of the original chapel in the United States. The Portiuncula Chapel at the Franciscan Monastery of the Holy Land in America in Washington, D.C., was also built around the same time. Originally, the chapel was located at the site of Peabody's death. It was moved to its present location near the mansion in 1973. Behind the chapel, a semi-circular memorial wall surrounding a flower and herb garden, was constructed by the Franciscan Order of Friars Minor.

In 1927, the St. Joseph Seminary was added to the complex, but was later demolished. In 1951, an additional wing was added to the country house (now known as the retreat wing). St. Paschal's Friary was built on the estate between 1952 and 1964. The Friary was demolished in 2011. During the 1930s and 1970s, the Franciscans sold large portions of the estate.

In 1991, the Franciscans announced the pending sale of the remaining 87 acres (350,000 m^{2}) to a developer who planned to raze remaining buildings and build 130 luxury homes. Conservationists, historic preservationists and DuPage County citizens formed a group to save the historic property. With the assistance of the group's efforts, DuPage County voters approved a $17.5 million referendum providing the Forest Preserve District with funds to purchase Mayslake in 1992. The area is now part of the Forest Preserve District of DuPage County. Mayslake Hall hosts cultural and educational programs throughout the year, including lectures, art classes, and concerts. Paid, guided tours of the hall take place on weekdays from 12:30 pm and on Saturdays at 11:30 am. The estate used to be home to First Folio Theatre. First Folio Theatre ceased operations in early 2023.

== Architecture ==
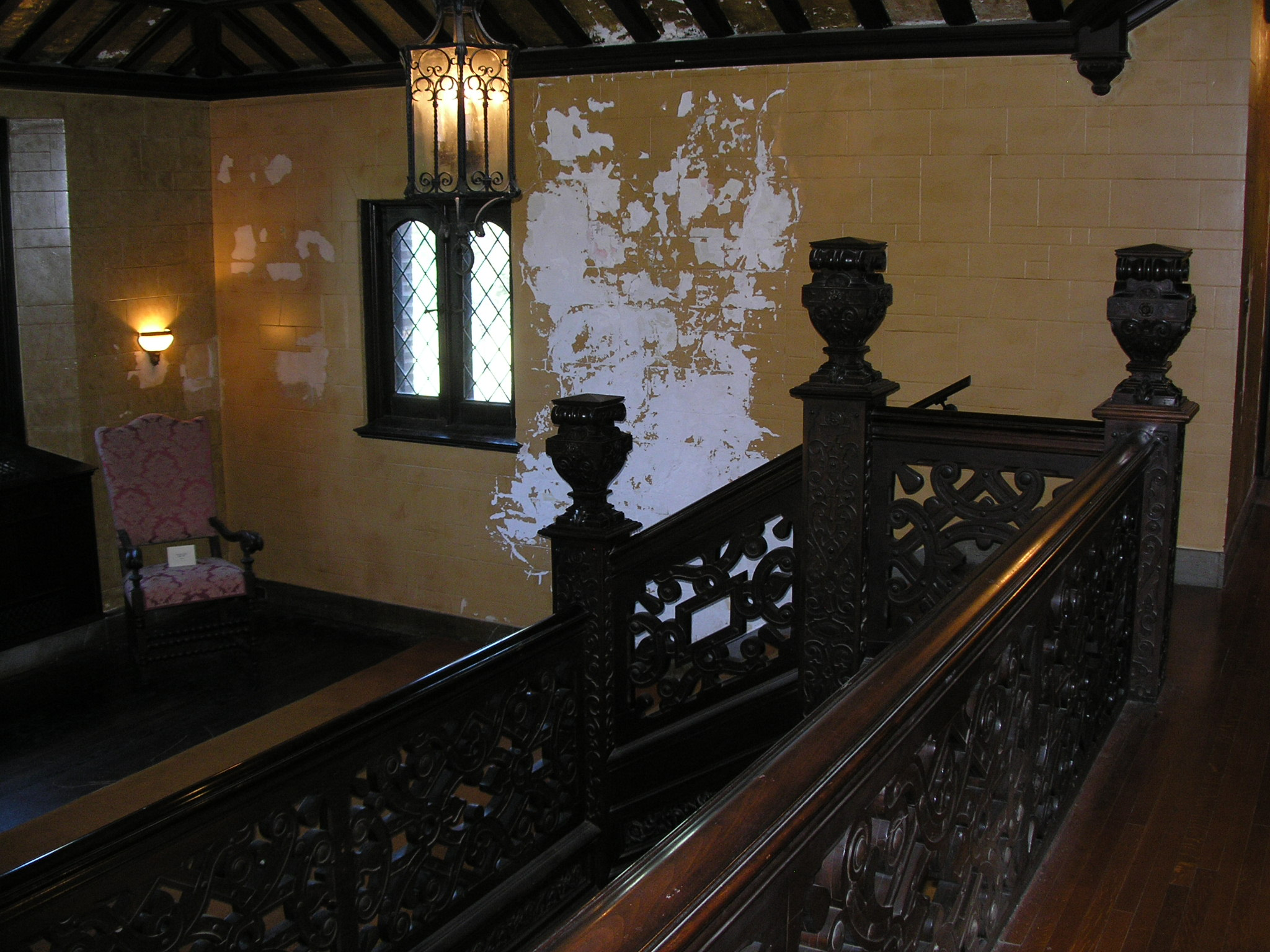
A hand-carved staircase of walnut leads guests onto the second floor. Architectural damage can be seen on the walls.

Mayslake Hall was designed in the Tudor Revival style by Benjamin Marshall of Marshall & Fox, an architectural firm based in Chicago. The country house somewhat resembles Compton Wynyates, a 15th-century manor house in Warwickshire, England. The building's architectural elements include decorative half-timbering and groups of tall, narrow windows.

Mayslake Hall features a library, kitchen, private study, numerous bedrooms and bathrooms, servants' quarters, and other rooms. Francis Peabody's private study contains a secret staircase leading to a basement.

During years of disrepair, the building suffered significant architectural and structural damage, but is being remediated by a restoration process within Mayslake Hall. The restoration is ongoing.

The service complex was designed by Howard Van Doren Shaw including servants' quarters, horse stables, garages, workshops, and a greenhouse, but these service buildings have since been razed.
