= Mallard Lake Landfill =

Landfill in Illinois

Coordinates: 41.9525000°N 88.1442000°W

Mallard Lake Landfill is a solid waste landfill in DuPage County, Illinois, west of Mallard Lake.

In 1974, the DuPage County Forest Preserve District established a solid waste landfill west of the lake. The landfill began operation March 4, 1975 and the last load of waste arrived March 13, 1999. The landfill occupies 230 acres (0.9 km^{2}) and rises to 982 feet (299.3 m) MSL making it the highest point in DuPage County. In 1994, the district contracted with Browning-Ferris Industries (BFI) for landfill gas extraction rights and electricity production with operations beginning November 1997. The district received royalties from the landfill gas of $71,276 in 2006 and $145,973 in 2005.

On April 20, 2006, Tyanna and Jeff Cannata of West Chicago, filed a class action lawsuit against the Forest Preserve District of DuPage County, the owner of the Mallard Lake landfill, and Browning-Ferris Industries (BFI), operator of the landfill, claiming that the landfill was the source of a carcinogenic contaminant, vinyl chloride, found in the well water in Carol Stream, Hanover Park, Bartlett, and Wayne Township. The lawsuit was given class action status on behalf of 150 residents on October 11, 2006.

In July 2006, the Illinois Environmental Protection Agency stated that many years of groundwater testing surrounding the landfill indicated no evidence of contamination and that during recent testing, no volatile organic compound contamination was found in about 103 down gradient private wells. Joe Benedict, environmental services manager for DuPage County Forest Preserve District, reported that, based on the EPA results, there was no contamination. The DuPage County Health Department also tested 87 wells and found no vinyl chloride contamination.

In October 2007, methane gas was found in probes installed around the boundaries of the Mallard Lake Landfill in DuPage County, Illinois.

== Gallery ==
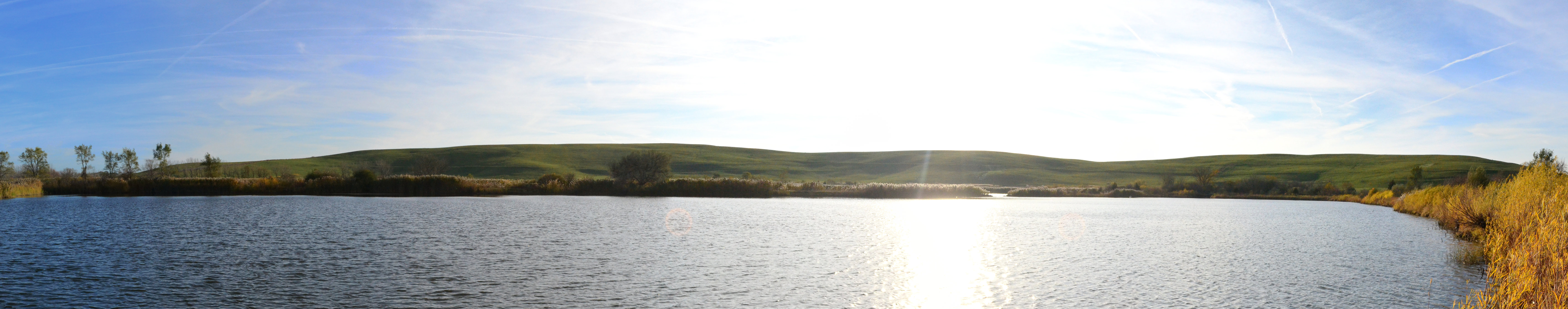
Mallard Lake Landfill from the North-East
