= FilmCrave =

- Available in: English
- Founded: August 2007
- Owners: ImaJAN Media, LLC
- Key people: Alex Olson, Nick Barry, Chris Kavan
- Website: FilmCrave.com
- Registration: Optional
- Current status: Active

FilmCrave is an online movie social network that allows users to write movie reviews, share movie lists, watch trailers and interact with other members. Founded by three college friends in February 2007, the site was launched in August 2007. FilmCrave is privately owned and funded by ImaJAN Media LLC, Missouri.

== Rankings and lists ==
FilmCrave’s users rate movies on a 0.5 – 4 star scale. These ratings help to determine the overall "rankings" of movies. Users can also add movies to specific lists such as the "Top Movies of All time" and "Top Action Films". User rankings on these lists are factored into FilmCrave’s "Top Movie" lists. The site also features similar lists related to new DVD and Blu-ray releases.

== Critical reception ==
Terrence Russell of VentureBeat says that FilmCrave has "made a name for itself as the social network for movie buffs". CNET's Don Reisinger lists FilmCrave as a social network for movie buffs where you can "find other members who might have similar movie tastes by comparing their reviews to yours." FilmCrave was listed as an alternative to Facebook by AOL's "Switched", as "FilmCrave's biggest appeal is its simplicity." Mashable has described FilmCrave as a "fun movie rating and review social site that rewards users for participation", selecting it for their "Best Niche and Miscellaneous Social Networks" award in 2007. The site took second place in the "Most Innovative" category in the 2008 StartupNation Home-Based 100 awards.

== Syndication ==
Filmcrave launched an API web service in March 2009 that allows other movie websites to access the site's reviews, ratings, cast, plots and other movie data.
