= Coopwood =

Coopwood is a surname. Notable people with the surname include:

- Bethel Coopwood (1827–1907), American lawyer and historian
- Jeff Coopwood (born 1958), American actor, singer, broadcaster, and educator
- Jesse Coopwood (1928–2001), American jazz radio broadcaster
