= Beat Radio =

Radio station in Minneapolis, Minnesota (1996, 1998)

- Minneapolis, Minnesota; United States
- Broadcast area: Twin Cities and national
- Frequencies: July 21 - November 1, 1996: 97.7 MHz; February 18 - October 24, 1998: Minneapolis/St. Paul: 1280 kHz; Phoenix: 740 kHz; New York: 1660 kHz; Los Angeles: 830 kHz; Denver: 1340 kHz; Chicago: 930 kHz; Ft. Worth/Dallas: 1360 kHz; Kansas City: 1480 kHz; Philadelphia: 1590 kHz; Detroit: 1090 kHz
- Branding: Beat Radio

Programming
- Format: Club music/House music

Ownership
- Owner: Alan Freed

History
- First air date: July 21, 1996 (FM); February 18, 1998 (national network)
- Last air date: November 1, 1996 (debut FM period); October 24, 1998 (national network)

Technical information
- ERP: 20 watts (debut FM period)

Links
- Website: beatworld.com

Beat Radio originally was an unlicensed radio station in Minneapolis, Minnesota that played dance music. Founded by local radio DJ and programmer, Alan Freed, in 1996, the station served downtown Minneapolis and surrounding neighborhoods and reached into the western, northwestern and southwestern suburbs. The original station at 97.7 FM operated for 103 days until it was shut down by the Federal Communications Commission. Beat Radio subsequently moved to licensed stations and eventually became a nationwide radio network.

== History ==
Freed, who had worked on-air at local stations WWTC, KTCJ, KMOJ, KBEM-FM, the now-defunct KMAP and at WUSL Philadelphia ("Power99"), launched Beat Radio on July 21, 1996, on 97.7 MHz with a 20-watt transmitter at 110 feet in downtown Minneapolis. For the next three months, the unauthorized station played house and other forms of club music on a signal that covered most of the city and into the north, west and southwest suburbs. The station was not licensed; a month later, KNXR in Rochester sent the FCC a series of listener complaints. On November 1, 1996, Beat Radio was shut down by FCC agents accompanied by U.S. Marshals. The FCC had to defend its action in U.S. District Court as Freed challenged the agency in a legal case that lasted for four years and reached the Eighth Circuit Court of Appeals. No fines or penalties were levied against Freed or anyone related to the station. Freed criticized a 1978 FCC decision that required most radio stations to broadcast with 100 W and eliminated the 10-watt Class D.

However, this was not the end of Beat Radio. A year later, in November 1997, Beat Radio returned to the air for three hours a week on local community station KFAI on Sunday nights from 2 to 5 a.m. Beat Radio also hosted events at local nightclubs, including First Avenue in Minneapolis.

Beat Radio expanded nationwide when locally owned, pioneering children's radio network Radio AAHS discontinued operations at the end of January 1998. The network's owner, Children's Broadcasting Corporation, needed programming for its owned and operated AM stations until the stations were sold. As a result, on February 18, 1998, Beat Radio began airing live nightly from Minneapolis on the ten CBC stations across the United States, in Los Angeles (830), New York (1660), Chicago (930), Denver (1340), Phoenix (740), Ft. Worth/Dallas (1360), Kansas City (1480), Philadelphia (1590), Detroit (1090) and Minneapolis/St. Paul (1280). The national broadcast continued until late October 1998, when the sale of the stations to Catholic Family Radio closed. In some cases, Beat was bumped by lease or other agreements.

Beat Radio returned yet again, less than a year later, on July 24, 1999, when it started airing on KVSC from St. Cloud, Minnesota. It aired on the second Saturday of every month from 4 to 7 p.m. until December 1999, when Freed joined Grooveradio.com, an early dance music webcaster, in Los Angeles.

Alan Freed is still heavily involved in dance music radio as a consultant. He went on to program BPM on XM Satellite Radio from 2004 to 2007 and later, from 2007 to 2008, was music director at WorldSpace Satellite Radio's The System dance channels, one of which was programmed for XM on channel 82 (defunct as of February 6, 2009).
