= WKBM =

Relevant Radio station in Sandwich, Illinois

- Sandwich, Illinois; United States
- Broadcast area: Chicago metropolitan area
- Frequency: 930 kHz

Programming
- Language: English
- Format: Catholic radio
- Network: Relevant Radio

Ownership
- Owner: Relevant Radio; (Relevant Radio, Inc.)
- Sister stations: WSFS; WWCA

History
- First air date: May 1986
- Former call signs: WBYG (1986–1988); WAUR (1988–2014)

Technical information
- Licensing authority: FCC
- Facility ID: 48240
- Class: B
- Power: 2,500 watts (day); 4,200 watts (night)
- Transmitter coordinates: 41°36′26″N 88°27′11″W
- Translator: 99.1 W256DU (Cloverdale)

Links
- Public license information: Public file; LMS
- Webcast: Listen Live
- Website: www.relevantradio.com

WKBM (930 AM) is a noncommercial radio station licensed to Sandwich, Illinois, United States, and serving much of the Chicago metropolitan area. It carries a Catholic radio format as an owned-and-operated station of Relevant Radio, largely simulcasting WSFS (950 AM).

WKBM's transmitter is sited on Legion Road at Immanuel Road in Yorkville, Illinois. Programming is also heard on 34-watt FM translator W256DU at 99.1 MHz in Cloverdale, Illinois.

== History ==
=== Full service era ===
The station began broadcasting in May 1986. The original call sign was WBYG. The station was originally owned by Larry Nelson. On April 11, 1988, the station's call sign was changed to WAUR. From the late 1980s until 1990 aired a full service format with country music and news, information, and talk programming. In 1990 the country music was replaced with Oldies, with the station airing full-service format with a strong emphasis on local issues. It continued to air this format until its sale to the Children's Broadcasting Corporation in 1997.

=== Children's Broadcasting Corporation ===
On February 5, 1997, the station was purchased by Children's Broadcasting Corporation for $3.9 million, and it became the Chicago affiliate of the "Radio AAHS" network, airing children's programming. After Radio AAHS discontinued operations in January 1998, Children's Broadcasting Corporation, began leasing time on its stations until it could find buyers. In February 1998, WAUR, along with the other nine CBC stations, became an outlet for "Beat Radio", which broadcast electronic dance music 12 hours each night.

=== Catholic Radio Network ===
In late 1998, the station was sold to Catholic Radio Network, later known as Catholic Family Radio, and it began airing a Catholic oriented talk format. In late 1999, Catholic Radio Network had entered into an agreement to the station to Saul Acquisition Co. for $4.4 million. The plans were for the station to be operated by Radio Center for People with Disabilities, with Catholic Family Radio continuing to air temporarily during certain time-slots. However, the sale was never consummated, ownership reverted to Catholic Family Radio, and the station was taken off the air temporarily in spring of 2001.

=== Victory 930 ===
In spring 2001, Catholic Family Radio entered into a local marketing agreement with Michigan based religious broadcaster Midwest Broadcasting (now known as Christian Broadcasting System), and the station returned to the air broadcasting a religious format. The station was branded "Victory 930". In late 2001, Midwest Broadcasting entered into an agreement to purchase the station for $4 million. However, the Radio Center for People with Disabilities filed a challenge with the Federal Communications Commission to block the sale of the station, on the basis that the purchaser was not a member of a minority, and the sale was never consummated.

=== Relevant Radio ===
Former logo

In 2004, WAUR was sold to Starboard Broadcasting for $3.5 million, and the station began airing its current Catholic format as an affiliate of Relevant Radio. The station changed its call sign to the current WKBM on June 18, 2014.
