= KMAP =

KMAP may refer to:

- KRFD (FM), a radio station (100.1 FM) licensed to serve Fleming, Colorado, United States, which held the call sign KMAP from 2008 to 2012
- KMAP (AM), a defunct radio station (1370 AM) formerly licensed to serve South St. Paul, Minnesota, United States
- Karnaugh map, a method to simplify Boolean algebra expressions
- KRLD-FM, a radio station licensed to serve Dallas, Texas, United States which used the KMAP call sign from 1962 to 1968
