= Bloomingdale Township, Illinois =

Bloomingdale Township
- Township
- Location in DuPage County

- DuPage County's location in Illinois
- Coordinates: 41°56′40″N 88°05′20″W
- Country: United States
- State: Illinois
- County: DuPage
- Settled: November 6, 1849

Government
  - Supervisor: Michael D. Hovde, Jr.

Area
  - Total: 35.38 sq mi (91.6 km^{2})
  - Land: 34.17 sq mi (88.5 km^{2})
  - Water: 1.21 sq mi (3.1 km^{2}) 3.41%
- Elevation: 781 ft (238 m)

Population (2020)
  - Total: 111,875
  - Density: 3,274/sq mi (1,264/km^{2})
- Time zone: UTC-6 (CST)
  - Summer (DST): UTC-5 (CDT)
- ZIP codes: 60101, 60103, 60108, 60137, 60133, 60139, 60143, 60148, 60157, 60172, 60185, 60188, 60190
- FIPS code: 17-043-06600
- Website: Bloomingdale Township

Bloomingdale Township is one of nine townships in DuPage County, Illinois, United States. As of the 2020 census, its population was 111,875 and it contained 42,488 housing units.

== Geography ==
According to the 2021 census gazetteer files, Bloomingdale Township has a total area of 35.38 square miles (91.63 km^{2}), of which 34.17 square miles (88.50 km^{2}) (96.59%) is land and 1.21 square miles (3.13 km^{2}) (3.41%) is water.

=== Cities, towns, and villages ===
- Addison (west quarter)
- Bloomingdale
- Carol Stream (partial)
- Glendale Heights (majority)
- Hanover Park (partial)
- Itasca (partial)
- Lombard (north edge)
- Roselle (partial)
- Schaumburg (partial)
- Winfield (north edge)

=== Unincorporated communities ===
- Cloverdale at 41.939473°N 88.120349°W
- Glen Ellyn Countryside at 41.9099°N 88.0645°W
- Keeneyville at 41.967528°N 88.12035°W
- Medinah at 41.981417°N 88.051181°W
- Swift at 41.920307°N 88.042290°W

(This list is based on USGS data and may include former settlements.)

== Natural features ==
- Lake Kadijah
- Mallard Lake
- Maple Lake
- Mitchell Lakes

== Landmarks ==
Bloomingdale Township contains several preserves and recreational areas managed by the Forest Preserve District of DuPage County:

- Mallard Lake Forest Preserve
- East Branch Forest Preserve
- West Branch Forest Preserve

== Transportation ==
=== Major highways ===
- Interstate 355
- U.S. Route 20
- Illinois Route 19
- Illinois Route 53
- Illinois Route 64
- Illinois Route 390

=== Airports and heliports ===
- Clarke Heliport
- Mitchell Field (historical)
- Schaumburg Regional Airport (partial)

== Cemeteries ==
The township contains seven cemeteries: Bloomingdale, Cloverdale, Freinenigreit, Old Ontarioville, St. Andrew Ukrainian Orthodox, St. Isidore’s, and St. Luke’s Lutheran.

== Demographics ==
As of the 2020 census, there were 111,875 people, 40,428 households, and 28,278 families residing in the township. The population density was 3,161.92 inhabitants per square mile (1,220.82/km^{2}). There were 42,488 housing units at an average density of 1,200.84 per square mile (463.65/km^{2}). The racial makeup of the township was 57.87% White, 5.33% African American, 0.79% Native American, 16.15% Asian, 0.06% Pacific Islander, 9.84% from other races, and 9.97% from two or more races. Hispanic or Latino of any race were 21.26% of the population.

There were 40,428 households, of which 32.0% had children under 18, 54.9% were married couples, 11.3% had a female householder with no spouse present, and 30.1% were non-families. 24.4% of households consisted of individuals, and 9.6% had someone living alone who was 65 or older. The average household size was 2.73 and the average family size was 3.30.

The median household income was $81,010, and the median family income was $95,914. The per capita income was $36,952. About 6.1% of families and 8.6% of the population were below the poverty line, including 14.2% of those under age 18 and 5.1% of those 65 or over.

Historical population
Census	Pop.	Note	%±
1960	14,924		—
1970	36,654		145.6%
1980	79,571		117.1%
1990	96,050		20.7%
2000	111,709		16.3%
2010	111,899		0.2%
2020	111,875		0.0%
U.S. Decennial Census

== Political districts ==
- Illinois's 6th congressional district

8th congressional district 3rd congressional district

- State House Districts 45, 55, 56
- State Senate Districts 23, 28

== See also ==
- DuPage County, Illinois
- List of townships in Illinois
