= Radio AAHS =

American children's radio network

- Type: Children's radio
- Country: United States

Ownership
- Parent: Children's Broadcasting Corporation
- Key people: Christopher Dahl (CEO)

History
- Founded: 1990 by Christopher Dahl
- Launch date: May 12, 1990
- Closed: January 31, 1998
- Replaced by: Beat Radio (O&Os only)

Coverage
- Stations: 32

Radio AAHS was an American radio network owned and operated by the Children's Broadcasting Corporation.

The flagship station of the format was WWTC (1280 AM) in Minneapolis, from where network programming originated at the former First Federal Bank building in St. Louis Park at Minnesota State Highway 100 and Excelsior Boulevard. At its height in 1996, Radio AAHS had 29 affiliates across the U.S. CBC founder Christopher Dahl had acquired WWTC in 1990 to create a format consisting largely of music for children, specifically targeted at 5 to 10 year olds. The format included songs from child-oriented films, but also created a niche for songs recorded specifically to entertain children. The programming was driven, in large part, by listener requests, and many of the choices were little known outside that audience.

== History ==
Children's Broadcasting Corp. was founded by Dahl in 1990, with the concept for a children's radio network. Dahl ran AAHS the format on WWTC as a test run for two years. With Arbitron not tracking listeners under 12, Dahl had commissioned a survey from Arbitron to determine its weekly listeners in 1993, which indicated a total of 90,000.

With the survey in hand, Dahl took Children's Broadcasting Corp. public. Radio AAHS then went national, focusing on the country's top 100 markets. In late 1994, the company was attempting to raise $20 million partly to purchase stations in New York and Chicago. CBC and a music division of Time Warner Inc. launched a monthly magazine that included a CD in February 1995.

In 1996, Radio AAHS signed a marketing agreement with The Walt Disney Company to expand the AAHS brand. Disney was to sell ads and assist in growing Radio AAHS through its recently purchased ABC Radio. However, "These guys started out right from the beginning to deceive us," according to Dahl. Dahl cited Disney Director of Strategic Planning & Development Lynn Kesterson-Townes as saying, "That her job at Disney for the next six months was to learn all she could regarding Children's operations."

In the nine months of the arrangement, CBC claimed Disney sold only $23,000 in ads and recruited no new affiliates. In a later lawsuit, CBC's lawyers detailed a deposition from eventual Radio Disney manager Scott McCarthy, who said that he instructed his staff to meet only certain contractual minimums.

The deal with Disney fell apart in June 1996, when then-ABC President David Kantor told CBC that Disney would not exercise its warrants and that it was close to starting its own kids network. On July 30, Disney formally canceled the contract and announced it was creating its own kids network. Following that announcement, Disney informed Radio AAHS that it was no longer allowed to broadcast from Disney theme parks.

Disney's launch of its own, CHR-oriented children's network, Radio Disney, spelled the demise of Radio AAHS. Children's Broadcasting Corporation was unable to compete with Disney's name recognition and resources. After briefly renaming itself AAHS World Radio, the network discontinued programming in January 1998. The corporation broadcast a mix of random music and paid-programming (6am-6pm CT) and Beat Radio, a dance/club music format (6pm-6am CT), until its ten company-owned stations could be sold. The sale of the last of the stations was completed in late October 1998 to Catholic Family Radio.

Some of the Radio Aahs staff joined XM Kids, the children's channel of XM Satellite Radio, which launched in late 2001.

In 2002, Children's Broadcasting won a lawsuit against Disney for $9.5 million in damages, with the judgment becoming final in 2004. The assets of Radio AAHS were rolled into Intelefilm Corp. The business changed its focus to provision of digital services and products, but soon filed for Chapter 11 bankruptcy. The award of $12.4 million from Disney was used to pay creditors following liquidation of the insolvent company.

== Programming ==
A sample hour of music early in 1995 included "I Just Can't Wait to Be King" (from The Lion King soundtrack) by Jason Weaver; "Don't Rock the Jukebox" by The Chipmunks and Alan Jackson; "Thank You" by Boyz II Men; "The Missing Parade" by Tom Chapin; "She Drives Me Crazy" by Kermit the Frog and Miss Piggy; and "Help!" by Little Texas.

Network programming began with a morning show, The All-American Alarm Clock (which was introduced by the Craig Taubman song, "Good Morning" at the top of the hour from 6 to 11 ET), and continued with music throughout the day, as well as a feature of News for Kids, skits, jokes and stories. The network grew by creating original content at a regional level and then serving out the shows to the network at-large. One program, The Toy Talk Show, was produced by Pangea Corporation and hosted by the three directors of the company, John Besmehn, John Schulte and Cheryl Ann Wong, during which children would call in and ask questions about toys, animation and new video games. Programs like the Toy Talk Show were a model for the network for several years, where producers would create and deliver both content and sponsorships for their airtime. With increased production costs, lackluster ratings and the juggernaut of Disney Radio attracting larger audiences and more sponsorship dollars, the shift away from original programming required the network to find an alternative approach to content creation.

Advertising revenue for the network came from sponsors such as Disney, Mattel and General Mills. During 1995–96, the network's magazine included a CD or tape of Radio AAHS favorites as part of the subscription. As the internet grew in popularity and children gained more access to it, Radio AAHS signed a content carriage agreement with NetRadio, a once rising and popular internet radio site. The intent was to increase ad blocks for both the traditional radio network and web streaming. As part of its expansion and vision, NetRadio was eager to attract a children's audience, due to the amount of advertising dollars that are spent on that demographic.

During its final years of operation, whenever Radio AAHS conducted a test of the Emergency Alert System, the test script was read by a voice similar to the Sesame Street character Grover.

== Affiliates ==
In addition to flagship station WWTC in Minneapolis, Radio AAHS was broadcast on AM stations nationwide and on an FM station in Spokane, Washington. In its fifth year, Radio AAHS had 27 affiliates. 30 percent of the United States was served by the format by early 1995, and the hope was to cover nearly half the country by the end of the year. Many of the stations had call letters that reflected the programming for children:

Former Radio AAHS affiliates
City of License or Media Market	State	Station	Frequency	Affiliated	Disaffiliated
Mobile	Alabama	WHOZ	660	1996	1998
Anchorage	Alaska	KYAK	650	1995	1998
Phoenix	Arizona	KIDR	740	1992	1998
Orange/Los Angeles	California	KPLS	830	1993	1998
San Luis Obispo	California	KIID	1400	1993	1995
Thousand Oaks	California	KAHS	850	1993	1997
Ventura	California	KAHS	1590	1994	1995
Denver	Colorado	KKYD	1340	1993	1998
Jacksonville	Florida	WJAX	1220	1994	1996
Orlando	Florida	WZKD	950	1994	1998
Chicago	Illinois	WAUR	930	1997	1998
Indianapolis	Indiana	WSYW	810	1995	1998
Des Moines	Iowa	KKSO	1390	1995	1998
Lafayette	Louisiana	KDYS	1520	1996	1997
Baltimore	Maryland	WKDB	1570	1993	1998
Detroit	Michigan	WDOZ	1310	1994	1996
Detroit	Michigan	WCAR	1090	1996	1998
Grand Rapids	Michigan	WISZ	640	1993	1995
Grand Rapids	Michigan	WISZ	810	1995	1996
Minneapolis–Saint Paul	Minnesota	WWTC	1280	1990	1998
Kansas City	Missouri	KCAZ	1480	1994	1998
Owensville	Missouri	KLZE	95.3	1994	1994
St. Louis	Missouri	WFUN-FM	95.5	1997	1998
Las Vegas	Nevada	KKDD	1400	1995	1996
Albuquerque	New Mexico	KDZZ	1520	1994	1998
New York City	New York	WJDM	1660	1996	1998
Wilmington	North Carolina	WAHH	1340	1996	1998
Cincinnati	Ohio	WAOZ	1360	1994	1996
Cleveland	Ohio	WELW	1330	1994	1998
Tulsa	Oklahoma	KMYZ	1570	1995	1998
Muskogee	Oklahoma	KMUS	1380	1997	1998
Eugene	Oregon	KDUK	1280	1995	1995
Philadelphia	Pennsylvania	WPWA	1590	1996	1998
Wilkes-Barre/Scranton	Pennsylvania	WMXH	750	1993	1994
Charleston	South Carolina	WAZS	980	1995	1990s
Greenville	South Carolina	WLWZ	1360	1996	1997
Memphis	Tennessee	WOWW	1430	1997	1998
Abilene	Texas	KYYD	1340	1993	1994
Dallas–Fort Worth	Texas	KAHZ	1360	1993	1998
Salt Lake City	Utah	KKDS	1060	1992	1997
Richmond	Virginia	WPES	1430	1997	1998
Richmond	Virginia	WHAP	1340	1997	1998
Washington, D.C.	Washington, D.C.	WKDL	1050	1993	1997
Manassas, Virginia	Washington, D.C.	WKDV	1460	1993	1997
Spokane	Washington	KAZZ	107.1	1994	1996
Wheeling	West Virginia	WOHZ	1600	1995	1998
Eau Claire	Wisconsin	WEIO	1050	1993	1998
