= WWCA =

- Gary, Indiana; United States
- Broadcast area: Northwest Indiana
- Frequency: 1270 kHz

Programming
- Format: Catholic radio
- Network: Relevant Radio

Ownership
- Owner: Relevant Radio; (Relevant Radio, Inc.)
- Sister stations: WKBM, WSFS

History
- First air date: December 7, 1949
- Call sign meaning: "Working With the Calumet Area"

Technical information
- Licensing authority: FCC
- Facility ID: 41332
- Class: B
- Power: 1,000 watts
- Transmitter coordinates: 41°31′38″N 87°22′36″W

Links
- Public license information: Public file; LMS
- Webcast: Listen live
- Website: relevantradio.com

WWCA (1270 AM) is a noncommercial radio station licensed to Gary, Indiana, United States, serving northwest Indiana. It airs a Catholic radio format as an owned and operated affiliate of Relevant Radio.

WWCA's transmitter is located off of Chase Street near 50th Street in Gary. Programming is also heard on 100-watt FM translator W268DI at 101.5 MHz in Gary.

== History ==
=== Early years ===
WWCA first signed on the air on December 7, 1949. It was owned by the Lake Broadcasting Company and had studios in Hotel Gary.

President and founder Dee O. Coe established the station and operated from studios that had housed WIND before that station moved to Chicago. Coe also owned WLOI in LaPorte, IN and other stations throughout the state. Co-owners of WWCA included its chief engineer Vic Voss and the Burns family, operators of a Gary funeral home. Other key personnel included general manager Joseph Haas, news & program director Ted Thorne and Sales Manager Al Evans. The station's studios were moved from Hotel Gary to the fourth floor of the First Federal Saving and Loan Association building at 545 Broadway. Licensed to the city of Gary, the station's transmitter was located in a then rural area south of the Gary city limits near 49th Avenue and Chase Street. The station's signal was directional, then requiring transmitter operators to hold 1st Class Federal Communications Commission (FCC) operator licenses.

Thorne, though a resident of Michigan City, IN, hosted the mid-day Sound-Off program which had a large following and delivered expanded newscasts at noon and again at 5 PM. Thorne left WWCA for a stint with WGN-TV, Channel 9, in Chicago, but later returned to the Gary station.

=== 1960s and 70s ===
WWCA experienced its peak in popularity during the 1960s and 1970s, with its community commitment and the popularity of its on-air personalities. Residents of Gary, Merrillville, Crown Point, Hobart and other northwestern Indiana cities and towns depended on WWCA for local news and sports coverage. Area residents tuned to WWCA for live on-the-scene coverage of breaking news events as well as weekly live coverage of high school sports. Broadcasts of basketball tournaments involved most of the on-air personalities broadcasting from multiple locations throughout northwestern Indiana.

Popular daytime programs included Tom Higgins’ morning program, "Sound-Off with Ted Thorne" at noon and Matt Hart in afternoon drive time. Morning news was delivered by Morris Wayne. Thorne and Doug Kullerstrand handled midday news chores. Play-by-play coverage of high school sports was the work of sports director Frank Sauline.

WWCA's nighttime audience belonged to R&B-music disc jockey Jesse Coopwood. The Coopwood show was one of the highest rated evening show in the Chicago area during the 1970s. During that time Coopwood worked with news reporter Tony Rose. Rose was a staple in the news department at WWCA from 1970 through the mid-1980s. After spending most of his career at WWCA, Coopwood was hired away by competitor WLTH in the late 1970s. Coopwood was replaced by a series of soul deejays, none of whom earned the level of listenership Coopwood brought to the station.

Also licensed to Gary, WWCA's primary local radio competitor during the 1960s and 70s was daytimer WLTH 1370 AM. Due to its FCC license, WLTH had to go off the air at sunset.

In the late 1960s, WWCA air personalities joined the American Federation of Television and Radio Artists (now SAG-AFTRA). Relationships between station management and personnel remained strained from that time forward. In the years that followed some individuals responsible for unionizing the staff were released from their jobs. A fire set in the early 1970s in the office of News Director Thorne was thought to be in retribution for the firings. The fire was contained in Thorne's office and little damage was done.

=== Popular personalities ===
Another WWCA personalities to leave for Chicago and eventually network air work was Frank Reynolds, then a news reporter. Reynolds joined WLS-TV Channel 7 in Chicago and later became a television anchor for ABC News. Emery King, also a reporter and host of the evening "Sound-Off" program in the early 1970s later worked for WBBM-TV Chicago and was White House reporter for NBC News before becoming a television anchor with WDIV Detroit.

During the 1980s, DJ Vivian Carter joined the staff hosting a Saturday morning program. Carter was better known in the area as "the hostess with the mostest" when she hosted a daily program for WJOB radio in Hammond, IN. She and husband James (Jimmy) Bracken owned a small record shop/recording studio in Gary. Jimmy's brother was part of the signing group, The Spaniels, which gained huge success in the 1950s. Vivian and Jimmy formed their own label VeeJay Records and began producing the Spaniels. The label's success took Vivian away from local radio for a period of years. After moving operations to California VeeJay signed other notable's such as The Four Seasons; The Beatles whose VeeJay album is a prized collectible; and Gladys Knight & the Pips (known as simply "The Pips" at the time).

=== 1980s and 90s ===
In the mid-1980s general manager Joe Hass developed leukemia. He died from soon after its diagnosis. Owner Dee Coe also developed the same disease shortly thereafter and the station was sold. Coe had already put the station on the sale block before he died. When Haas died Coe named Haas' secretary, Sylvia Burns, General Manager, a position she kept until the new owners took over. (Burns was no relation to stockholders of the same name.)Coe's death came relatively soon after Haas died. Coe's son, Ken Coe, who managed the family's LaPorte station, WLOI, took over the reins at WWCA for a short time before the station was sold.

WWCA's city of license moved from Gary to East Chicago in the early 90s. R. Veronica Williams was the former News Director of Willis Broadcasting Network. She was later with Chicago Public Radio WBEZ 91.5 FM and Radio-One Indianapolis AM 1310 "The Light" and 106.7 WTLC-AM-FM after the station was purchased by Willis Broadcasting. The city of license returned to Gary sometime in the late 1990s.

=== 2000s ===
In 2003, Willis Broadcasting Corp. sold the station to Starboard Broadcasting for $1.5 million. WWCA was off the air for several months as the ownership changed.

Former logo

It signed back on with Starboard Network's Relevant Radio Catholic talk and teaching format on November 26, 2003. It later switched to Relevant Radio's Spanish-language programming. Relevant Radio also owns two English-language Catholic sister stations in the Chicago area: WSFS 950 AM and WKBM 930 AM.
