= KIDR =

Spanish-language Catholic radio station in Phoenix

- Phoenix, Arizona; United States
- Broadcast area: Phoenix metropolitan area
- Frequency: 740 kHz
- Branding: EnFamilia Radio

Programming
- Language: Spanish
- Format: Catholic radio

Ownership
- Owner: En Familia, Inc.

History
- First air date: February 1, 1958
- Former call signs: KUEQ (1958–1967); KMEO (1967–1992)
- Call sign meaning: Kid Radio (former format)

Technical information
- Licensing authority: FCC
- Facility ID: 6383
- Class: B
- Power: 1,000 watts day; 292 watts night
- Transmitter coordinates: 33°21′55″N 112°6′30″W

Links
- Public license information: Public file; LMS
- Webcast: Listen Live
- Website: enfamiliamedios.org

KIDR (740 AM) is a radio station in Phoenix, Arizona, United States. KIDR is owned by En Familia, Inc. and airs a Spanish-language Catholic radio format. The station's transmitter is off South 23rd Avenue in Phoenix.

The station broadcasts with 1,000 watts by day; but because AM 740 is a Canadian clear-channel frequency, it must reduce power to 292 watts at night to avoid causing interference to CFZM. The station also protects KCBS in San Francisco and KTRH in Houston. KIDR uses a directional antenna around the clock.

== History ==
=== KUEQ ===
At 7:40 am on February 1, 1958, the station first signed on as KUEQ (written by the station as KUE-Q). The station was built by the Q Broadcasting Company and was believed to be the first fully automated radio station in the country, playing out programming from tapes during its daytime broadcast hours. Initial studios were located in the Villa Motel on East Van Buren Street.

KUEQ was sold twice in its first five years of broadcasting. Dynamic Associates became the licensee in 1959, selling to Radio Station KUEQ, Inc., in 1962.

=== Easy listening KMEO ===
In October 1964, KUEQ acquired a troubled FM station in Phoenix, KEPI at 96.9 MHz, and relaunched it as easy listening KMEO. Prior to being bought, KEPI had been off the air for most of 1964. In May 1967, KUEQ became KMEO, and the two stations became a simulcast. The stations branded as "Cameo," signifying a cameo carving, or a cherished piece of jewelry. Since KMEO was a daytime only station because it broadcast on a clear-channel frequency, the creation of the simulcast allowed KMEO-AM-FM to broadcast around the clock. From the 1960s till the early 90s, the two stations simulcast a beautiful music format, which was quite successful and lasted through several ownership changes.

In 1976, B & D Broadcasting, owned by the Beauchamp and Dodge families, bought KMEO-AM-FM; the pair was sold in 1980 to Scripps-Howard Broadcasting, which owned the stations until it was required to divest them in 1985 so it could acquire KNXV-TV, a decision upheld that July by the Federal Communications Commission. Group W bought the KMEO stations for $11.25 million later that year.

Initially, KMEO remained successful. When KQYT flipped from easy listening in 1986, its listeners moved to KMEO, shooting the station into a tie with KZZP at the top of the Phoenix radio ratings. However, by early 1989, Group W was ready to try something different, moving to a soft adult contemporary sound and away from the syndicated format it had used. However, the changes caused KMEO's ratings to decline. The AM station was the first in the Valley (and possibly the entire United States) to play continuous Christmas music, doing so in 1989, twelve years before the format went nationwide.

Bonneville International bought KMEO-AM-FM from Group W in 1991. AM and FM programming was split for good when Bonneville relaunched KMEO-FM as "Sunny 97" KPSN on July 3, 1991; it is now KMXP. KMEO remained an easy listening station for another year.

=== Children's Radio KIDR ===
As the popularity of easy listening music declined among younger listeners, KMEO changed formats. In October 1992, AM 740 became an affiliate of Radio AAHS, a children's radio network. The station changed its call sign to KIDR, standing for KID Radio. Although the station has changed ownership and formats several times, its callsigns still refer to "Kid Radio." (The KMEO call letters were briefly used in the early 90s at 93.7 FM in Wickenburg.)

Bonneville sold the station to Radio AAHS directly in 1997. In 1998, when Radio AAHS ended its operations, KIDR began carrying its successor network, which included, for 12 hours each night, a dance/EDM music format known as Beat Radio. During the summer of 1998, then-programming director Matt Miller would deejay an hour of contemporary dance and alternative rock music from 2-3 PM Wednesdays-Fridays, in what would be deemed "The Afternoon Fiesta". Later in 1998, KIDR began broadcasting the Catholic Radio Network.

=== Switch to Spanish-language ===
In 2000, KIDR was bought by Radio Única, a national Spanish-language talk network. Radio Única failed to attract enough listeners or advertisers, so in 2003, KIDR and the other Radio Única-owned stations were sold to Multicultural Broadcasting as part of a $150 million bankruptcy liquidation.

Force Broadcasting, LLC acquired KIDR from Multicultural in 2009 for $1.5 million. On December 28, 2012, Force Broadcasting sold KIDR to En Familia, Inc. for $1.85 million.
