= Amos Bullocks =

American football player (1939–2019)

No. 22, 28, 49
- Position: Running back

Personal information
- Born: February 7, 1939; Chicago, Illinois, U.S.
- Died: April 12, 2019 (aged 80); Chicago, Illinois, U.S.
- Listed height: 6 ft 1 in (1.85 m)
- Listed weight: 202 lb (92 kg)

Career information
- High school: Dunbar (IL)
- College: Southern Illinois (1958-1961)
- NFL draft: 1962: 20th round, 270th overall pick
- AFL draft: 1962: 10th round, 76th overall pick

Career history
- Dallas Cowboys (1962–1964); BC Lions (1965); Montreal Alouettes (1966)*; Pittsburgh Steelers (1966–1967)
- * Offseason or practice squad member only

Awards and highlights
- 3× All-IIAC (1959, 1960, 1961)

Career NFL statistics
- Rushing yards: 620
- Rushing average: 3.9
- Receptions: 15
- Receiving yards: 180
- Total touchdowns: 7
- Stats at Pro Football Reference

Amos Bullocks (February 7, 1939 – April 12, 2019) was an American professional football running back in the National Football League (NFL) for the Dallas Cowboys and Pittsburgh Steelers. He played college football at Southern Illinois University.

== Early life ==
Bullocks attended Chicago's Dunbar High School, before moving on to Southern Illinois University. He finished ranked first in school history in career rushing yards (2,441) and career touchdowns (32). He was twice named honorable-mention Little All-American.

In 1981, he was inducted into the Southern Illinois Athletics Hall of Fame.

== Professional career ==
=== Dallas Cowboys ===
Bullocks was selected by the Dallas Cowboys in the twentieth round (270th overall) of the 1962 NFL draft and by the Buffalo Bills in the tenth round (76th overall) of the 1962 AFL draft.

On December 9, 1961, he signed with the Cowboys. As a rookie he was the backup to Don Perkins and played predominantly on special teams. He had a franchise record 72-yard touchdown run against the Chicago Bears and also returned a kickoff for 62 yards against the New York Giants.

In 1963, he registered 341 (third on the team), 2 touchdowns and 453 kickoff return yards (23.8-yard average). In 1964, he contracted hepatitis and was placed on the injured reserve list.

The Cowboys selected offensive tackle Bill Frank in the 18th round of the 1963 NFL draft, but because he was still under contract in the Canadian Football League, the Cowboys had to additionally trade running back Bullocks to the BC Lions in exchange for Frank's playing rights on February 5, 1965.

=== BC Lions ===
Bullocks broke his ankle in the ninth game of the 1965 season after gaining 215 rushing yards (4.8 avg). He was waived on July 27, 1966.

=== Montreal Alouettes ===
After being announced that the Montreal Alouettes signed Bullocks on August 5, 1966, the team decided 5 days later not to follow through with the contract.

=== Pittsburgh Steelers ===
While being out of football, Bullocks wrote a letter to head coach Bill Austin asking for a trial and subsequently was signed to the team's taxi squad. He was later promoted to the regular roster and in the last game of the 1966 season against the Atlanta Falcons, posting 83 rushing yards on 29 carries and one touchdown. He was placed on the injured reserve list with a back injury on August 29, 1967.
