= Dunbar Vocational High School =

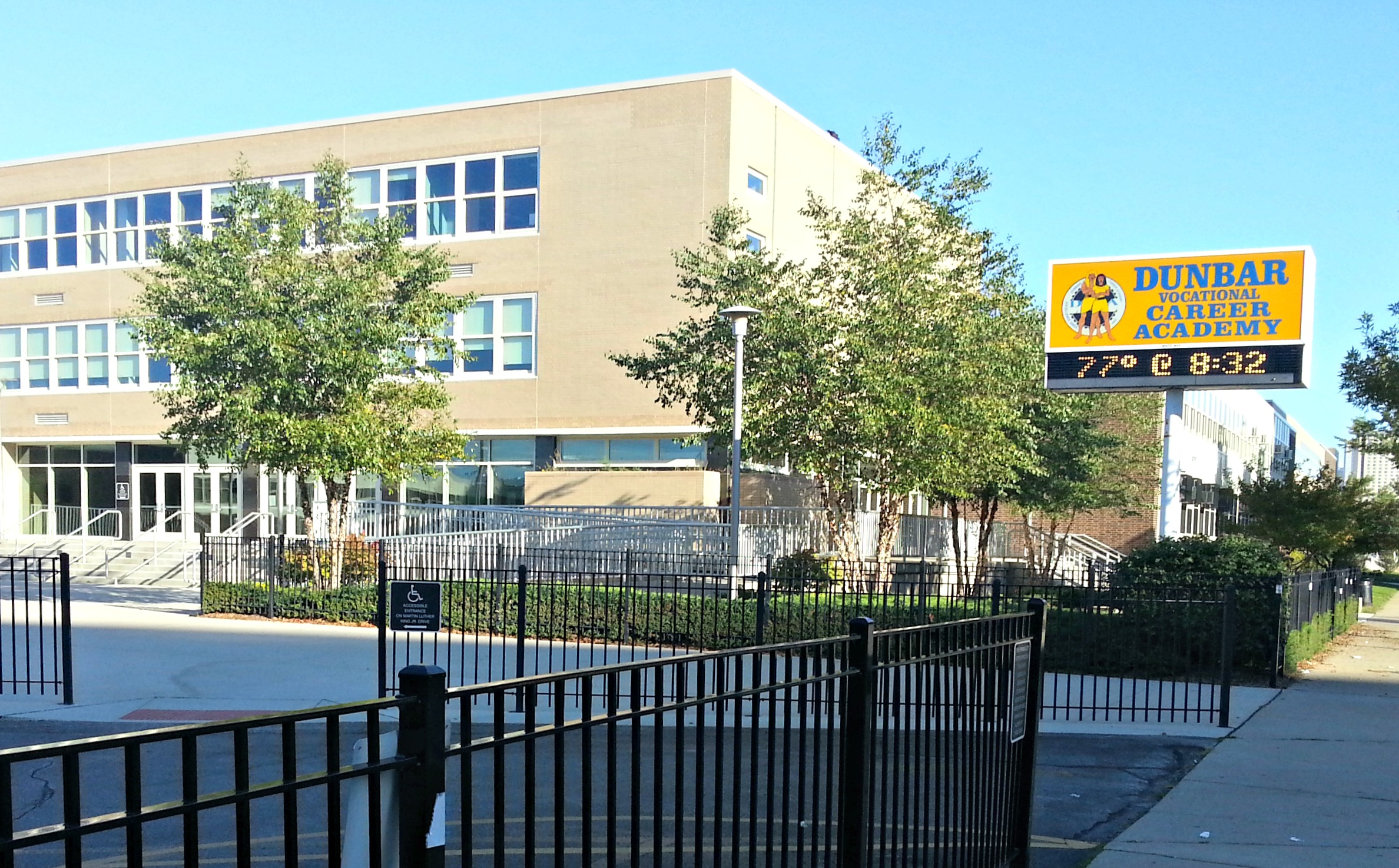

Location
- 3000 South Dr. Martin Luther King Jr. Drive; Chicago, Illinois 60616; United States
- 41°50′24″N 87°37′06″W

Information
- School type: Public; Secondary; Vocational
- Motto: “Restoring the Legacy of Excellence.”
- Opened: 1942; 84 years ago
- School district: Chicago Public Schools
- CEEB code: 140785
- Principal: Richard McMillan
- Grades: 9–12
- Gender: Coed
- Enrollment: 303 (2025–2026)
- Campus type: Urban
- Colors: Blue; Gold
- Athletics conference: Chicago Public League
- Team name: MightyMen/MightyWomen
- Accreditation: North Central Association of Colleges and Schools
- Newspaper: Craftsman
- Yearbook: Prospectus
- Website: dvca-cps.org

Dunbar Vocational High School (also known as Dunbar Vocational Career Academy, or DVCA) is a public 4–year vocational high school located in the Bronzeville neighborhood on the south side of Chicago, Illinois, United States. Dunbar opened in 1942 and is operated by the Chicago Public Schools (CPS) district. The school is named in honor of the African–American poet, novelist, and playwright Paul Laurence Dunbar.

== History ==
Opening in September 1942 as a Dunbar Trade School, the school was created to provide skill workers for the war. When the school opened, the school had a student enrollment of 1,500; Mostly all of which were African–American. The school was considered as a "vocational branch" of Wendell Phillips High School, considering both schools were predominately African–American. In 1946, the Chicago Public Schools changed the trade school into a public high school, accepting ninth grade students in January of that year. The school's first location was in a former elementary school building located at 4401 South St. Lawrence Avenue. In addition to the school building, twenty–two mobile classroom which served as vocational shops were constructed on the site over the course of several months after its opening.

By 1952, Dunbar suffered from issues dealing with overcrowding and aging of the school building. The Chicago Board of Education decided that a new school building was needed for Dunbar. A vacant site about two and a half miles north from the school's location was voted on and selected as the new Dunbar's location in mid–1954; costing the district a mere $7 million to construct. The groundbreaking ceremony for the new school occurred in April 1955 with Chicago school officials and then newly elected Chicago mayor Richard J. Daley, construction began at 3000 South Parkway Avenue (now Dr. Martin Luther King Jr. Drive) shortly thereafter. The new Dunbar Vocational High School building opened for students for the 1956–57 school year. By the school's 20th anniversary in 1962, the enrollment was at 2,300; which included students taking night classes and drop-outs enrolled in trade classes.

== Enrollment and demographics ==
Student Demographics (2025–2026)
1. Black or African-American (97.0%)
2. Hispanic or Latino (1.32%)
3. Non-Hispanic White (0.66%)
4. Asian (0.33%)
5. Multiracial (0.33%)
6. Native American or Pacific Islander (0.33%)

=== Other information ===
On February 5, 1968, students at the school staged a walk–out and gathered on the street in front of the school after rumors of the firing of a popular teacher circulated. It was also rumored that day the school would change from a vocational high school to a regular general high school. The walk–out caused classes to be canceled for four hours. The incident caused the disruption of traffic and damaging of several automobiles; which resulted in three arrests. In December 1968, the school held the "Afro–American Expo '68" which included local politicians, businessmen and activists. On January 9, 2009, five people were shot outside the school after a varsity basketball game against John Hope College Prep had concluded around 8PM. The shooting was considered gang-related. At least one person was convicted of aggravated battery for the shooting, that being 18-year-old Georgio Dukes, who was sentenced to nine years. On May 23, 2013, a 16–year old female student was pushed down a flight of stairs and assaulted by a male security guard at the school. The incident was filmed via cell phone video by another student.

== Athletics ==
Dunbar competes in the Chicago Public League (CPL) and is a member of the Illinois High School Association (IHSA). Dunbar sport teams are known as MightyMen/MightyWomen. The Boys' basketball team were Public League champions in the 1955–1956 season and regional champions in 2011–2012. The Girls' basketball team were Class AA in the 1997–1998 season. The girls track and field team were public league champions and placed second in 1977–1978 and Class AA three times (1977–1978, 1978–1979, 1985–1986). The boys' wrestling team were public league champions in 1977–1978 and ranked Class AA two times (1977–1978, 2007–2008). The boys' track and field were public league champions four times (1956–1957, 1957–1958, 1964–1965, 1981–1982), and Class AA (1981–1982).

== Notable alumni ==
- Barbara Acklin (class of 1961) — American R&B/soul singer.
- Amos Bullocks (class of 1957) — American NFL running back
- Jennifer Hudson (class of 1999) — American Academy Award-winning actress (Dreamgirls) and singer.
- Jimmy D. Lane (attended) — American blues guitarist who has recorded with Eric Clapton, Mick Jagger, Keith Richards, Van Morrison, Jimmy Rogers
- Ronnie Lester (class of 1976) — American NBA guard (1980–86), who was selected in the first round of the 1980 NBA draft. Named Associated Press All American while at the University of Iowa. He led the University of Iowa Hawkeyes to the 1978-1979 Big Ten Championship and the 1979-1980 NCAA Final Four. He was Iowa's all-time leading scoring and assists at the time of his graduation. His number is retired at the University of Iowa. He was a member of the Los Angeles Lakers when they won the 1985 NBA Championship.
- Lou Rawls (class of 1952) — American Grammy Award-winning Soul/R&B, jazz, and blues singer (You'll Never Find Another Love Like Mine, Love Is a Hurtin' Thing).
- Bernard Shaw (class of 1958) — American journalist and news anchor, perhaps best known for his work at CNN (1980–2001).
- Mr. T (Lawrence Tureaud) (class of 1970) — American actor (Rocky III, The A-Team).
- Jeanette Taylor (attended) — American politician, City of Chicago alderman (20th ward).
- LaDonna Tittle (class of 1964) — American radio personality (WBMX-FM, WJPC-FM, WGCI-FM)
- Cynda Williams (attended) — American actress (Mo' Better Blues)
- Darrell Williams (class of 2008) — American basketball player for Hapoel Tel Aviv of the Israeli Premier League

== Notable faculty ==
- Cornelius Coffey—American aviator
