= WPWA =

Radio station in Chester, Pennsylvania

- Chester, Pennsylvania; United States
- Broadcast area: Philadelphia metropolitan area
- Frequency: 1590 kHz

Programming
- Language: Spanish
- Format: Religious

Ownership
- Owner: Mount Ocean Media, L.L.C.

History
- First air date: October 17, 1947
- Last air date: April 2026
- Former call signs: WPWA (1947–1954); WDRF (1954–1959); WEEZ (1959–1976); WQIQ (1976–1985); WCZN (1985–1994); WAWA (October 12–24, 1994)

Technical information
- Licensing authority: FCC
- Facility ID: 37843
- Class: B
- Power: 2,500 watts day; 1,000 watts night
- Transmitter coordinates: 39°52′39.4″N 75°27′21.7″W

Links
- Public license information: Public file; LMS
- Website: www.wpwa.net

WPWA (1590 AM) was a radio station broadcasting a Spanish religious format. Licensed to Chester, Pennsylvania, it served the Philadelphia area. The station was owned by Mount Ocean Media, L.L.C. It operated from 1947 to 2026.

== History ==
WPWA was authorized in 1947. The station was owned by Lou Poller and broadcast with 1,000 watts from a site in Brookhaven. Poller, who had previously owned part of a station in Scranton before World War II, also proposed to build aluminum fabricated homes on the site and sell them. The tower was erected in June of that year, and the station signed on October 17. The station programmed primarily for Chester and surrounding areas. Its first music director, a young Bill Haley, hosted a country and Western show, sold advertising, and announced the sports and weather; he also recorded songs for James E. Myers, who would be credited five years later as writing Haley's "Rock Around The Clock". In 1950, WPWA began nighttime broadcasts.

In 1954, Poller sold WPWA to the Eastern Broadcasting Company, changing its call letters to WDRF for Delaware River Ferry upon Federal Communications Commission (FCC) approval of the sale on November 24. Eastern's owner, Louis Kapelski, also was the general manager of the Chester-Bridgeport Ferry Company. When WDRF, Inc., acquired the station in 1959, it changed the callsign to WEEZ. Radio Del-Val, Inc., owned by Ernest Tannen, acquired WEEZ in 1965; the same year, the station filed to sell part of its land to build a supermarket. WEEZ was a country music station in the late 1960s and early 1970s, hosting more than 20 "Country Shindig" concerts headlined by acts such as Buck Owens, Conway Twitty, and Merle Haggard.

By 1974, however, WEEZ was a talk station, featuring several former WCAU radio personnel in its lineup. Additionally, in 1973, WEEZ relocated from 3500 Edgmont Avenue in Brookhaven, where "Radio Park Drive" remains a local street, to a new industrial park in Aston, where it built a $200,000 circular structure. The move came a year after WEEZ and Brookhaven authorities clashed over the station hosting concerts on its land on Sundays.

WEEZ was sold in 1976 to the Upland Broadcasting Corporation, which assigned new WQIQ calls and branded the station "Delaware County's Only 24 Hour Local Voice". Robe Communications acquired WQIQ in 1981 and reformatted it as a nostalgia station; it also broadcast Villanova Wildcats men's basketball. In 1985, when 1590 AM was sold to Lloyd B. Roach, the station became WCZN and changed formats from adult contemporary to country.

In 1994, the station, which began airing adult standards music as "Unforgettable 1590" the previous year, made news with its call letters. Roach filed to change WCZN's call letters to WAWA, with the station being only a mile from the unincorporated community. While the FCC approved the application in September, the proposal drew interest from another Wawa: the Philadelphia-based convenience store chain, which filed suit in federal court and claimed the change in call letters violated state and federal trademark laws. The chain was successful in coercing another change of call letters; on October 24, WAWA became WPWA, restoring the original call letters after 40 years.

In 1996, after receiving an unsolicited offer from the Children's Broadcasting Corporation, Roach sold WPWA for $1.3 million; CBC flipped the station to the Radio AAHS network, airing children's programming. After Radio AAHS discontinued operations on January 30, 1998, Children's Broadcasting Corporation, WPWA's owner, needed programming for the ten CBC-owned and operated Radio AAHS stations until it could find buyers. In February 1998, WPWA, along with the other nine CBC stations, became an outlet for Beat Radio, which broadcast electronic dance music 12 hour each night until late October 1998, when the sale to the Catholic Radio Network was consummated. CRN sold the station for $675,000 to Mount Ocean, owned by Rev. Son Young Joo, in 2001. Under Mount Ocean ownership, the station has primarily offered ethnic and religious programming, including shows in Korean, gospel music, and, in 2005, Spanish-language coverage of the Philadelphia Phillies.

In 2012, former station employee Al Edmondson, Jr., began buying airtime on WPWA and programmed some local shows on Sunday mornings.

WPWA closed down for financial reasons in April 2026. The FCC cancelled the station's license on August 10, 2026.
