= WSFS (AM) =

Relevant Radio station in Chicago

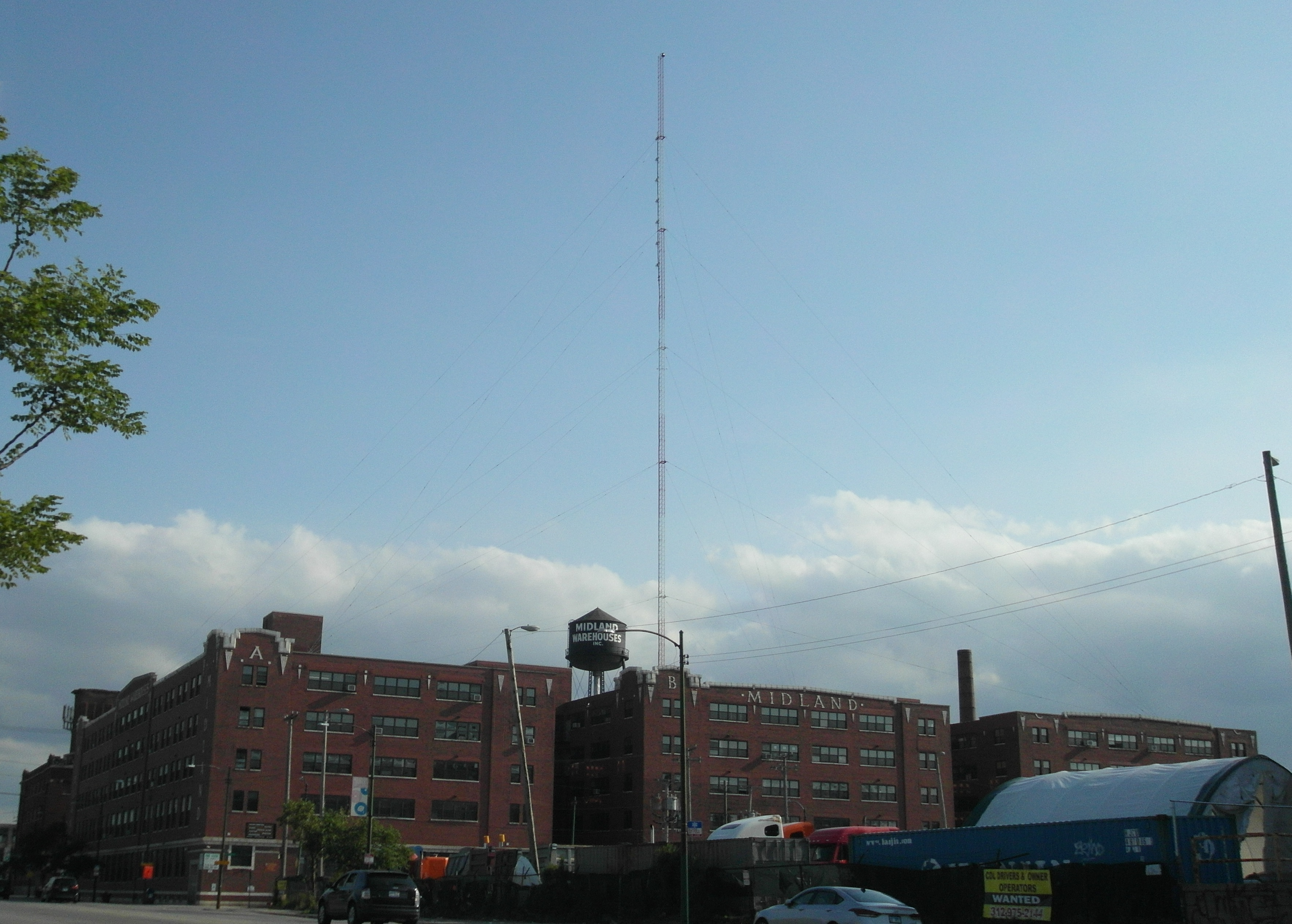
- WSFS's daytime tower atop Midland Warehouses
- Chicago, Illinois; United States
- Broadcast area: Chicago metropolitan area
- Frequency: 950 kHz

Programming
- Format: Catholic talk and teaching
- Network: Relevant Radio

Ownership
- Owner: Relevant Radio, Inc.
- Sister stations: WKBM; WWCA

History
- First air date: April 7, 1922 (date first licensed)
- Former call signs: WAAF (1922–1967); WGRT (1967–1973); WJPC (1973-1994); WEJM (1994–1997); WIDB (1997–1999); WNTD (1999–2026)

Technical information
- Licensing authority: FCC
- Facility ID: 6589
- Class: B
- Power: 1,000 watts (day); 5,000 watts (night)
- Transmitter coordinates: 41°51′39.12″N 87°41′12.2″W (day); 41°38′12.13″N 87°33′10.16″W (night)

Links
- Public license information: Public file; LMS
- Webcast: Listen live
- Website: relevantradio.com

WSFS (950 AM) is a radio station licensed to Chicago, Illinois, owned by Relevant Radio, Inc. It simulcasts a Catholic talk and teaching radio format, along with WKBM (930 AM) in Sandwich, Illinois. The stations' programming comes from the Relevant Radio network.

By day, the station is powered at 1,000 watts non-directional. Its daytime transmitter site is on South Western Avenue near 15th Street in Chicago. At night, while increasing its power to 5,000 watts, it also switches to a separate transmitter using a directional antenna with a six-tower array, that tower site is off East 142nd Street near South Manistee Avenue in Burnham, Illinois.

== History ==
=== WAAF ===
The United States Department of Commerce regulated the country's radio stations from 1912 until the 1927 formation of the Federal Radio Commission (FRC). Effective December 1, 1921, a regulation was adopted specifying that broadcasting stations were authorized for operation on wavelengths of 360 meters (833 kHz) for "entertainment" programs, and 485 meters (619 kHz) for "market and weather reports".

This station was one of the first broadcasting stations in Chicago. It was initially licensed on April 7, 1922, to the Union Stock Yards & Transit Company, with its transmitter and studios located at the yards. It was authorized to transmit on both wavelengths, and its original call sign, randomly issued from a sequential roster, was WAAF. A few months later, ownership was changed to Chicago Daily Drovers Journal.

In 1923, WAAF's frequency was changed to 1050 kHz. In late 1924, the station began broadcasting at 1080 kHz, with a power of 200 watts. By 1927, the station's power had been increased to 500 watts, and its frequency changed to 770 kHz. On November 11, 1928, under the provisions of the FRC's General Order 40, the frequency was changed to 920 kHz, limited to daytime hours only.

WAAF's programming was initially devoted to trade news, but in 1929 it was broadened to include music programs, along with news, live market reports, and a variety of other programs.

WAAF's transmitter and studios were destroyed in the 1934 Stock Yards fire. The station broadcast live coverage of the fire until smoke and heat forced them to leave the building. The station's studios were moved to the Palmer House following the fire.

In 1936, the power was increased to 1,000 watts. In the 1940s, the station aired orchestral music and popular music. In March 1941, WAAF moved to its current frequency of 950 kHz., with the implementation of the North American Regional Broadcasting Agreement. In 1948, studios were moved to the LaSalle-Wacker Building.

In 1955, WAAF began airing "Juke Box Matinee", hosted by Hal Fredericks, in association with the Recorded Music Service Association and the Chicago Juke Box Operators' Association. The show featured a monthly "Hunch Tune", which would be promoted on the show and featured as the No. 1 selection in juke boxes. The first "Hunch Tune" was "Rollin' Stone" by Eddie Fontaine. In 1956, the station adopted a jazz format. Personalities heard on the station during its jazz years included Marty Faye, Daddy-O Daylie, Olympic gold medalist Jesse Owens, and Dick Buckley.

=== WGRT ===
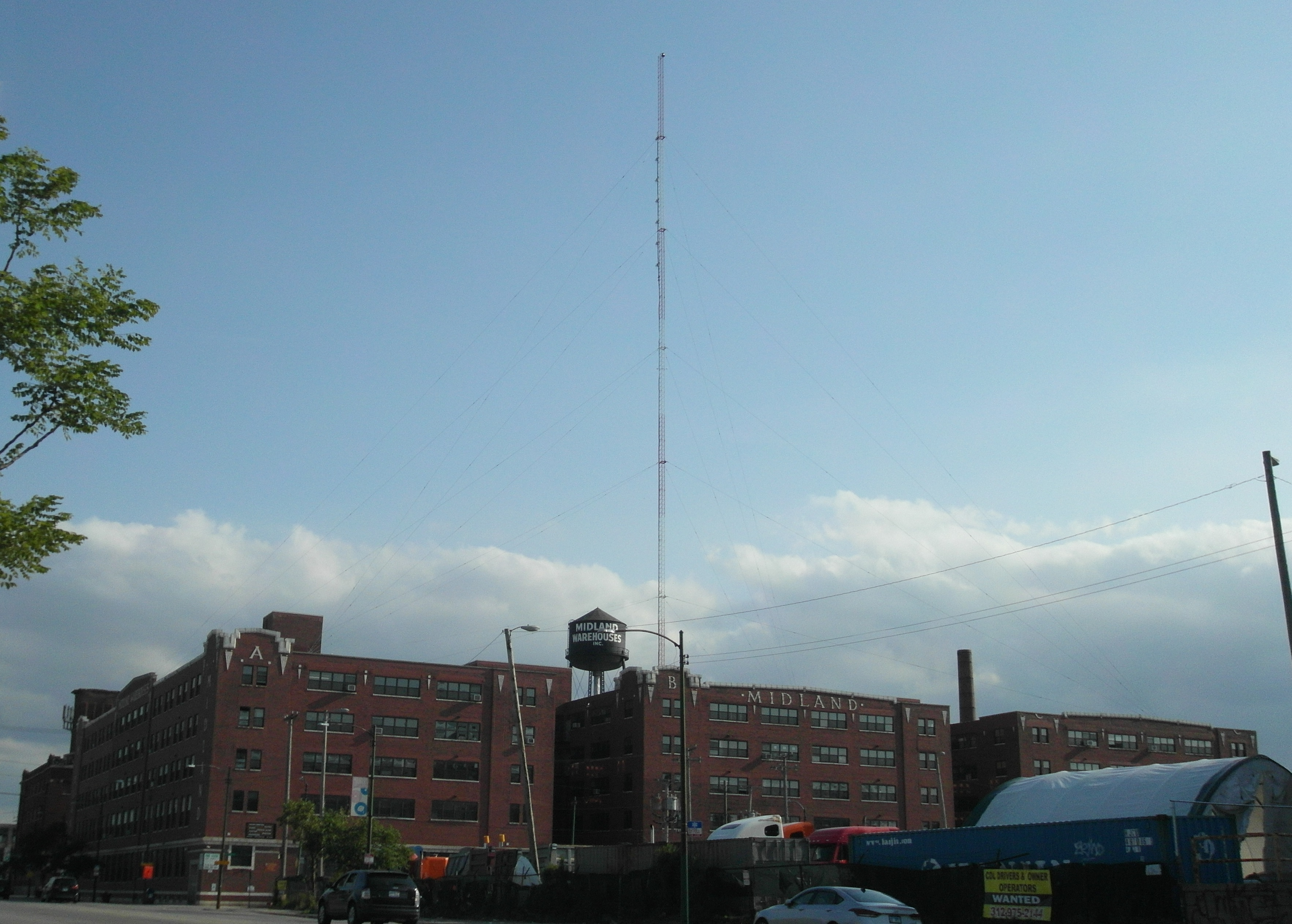
WSFS's daytime tower atop Midland Warehouses

In 1967, WAAF was sold to a corporation formed by Ralph Atlass, for $900,000. Previously, the station had boasted that it held "Chicago's Oldest Call Letters". However, under the new owners, the call sign was changed to WGRT ("W-Great!") and it adopted a soul music format. Daddy-O Daylie continued as a DJ on WGRT, hosting a morning jazz program. Daylie's jazz program was initially two hours long, but was reduced to an hour and a half, and eventually a half-hour in 1971. In 1971, the station's transmitter site was moved to the Midland Warehouses on Western Avenue in Chicago.

=== WJPC ===
On May 29, 1973, the station was purchased by Johnson Publishing Company for $1,800,000, and on November 1, 1973, the call sign was changed to WJPC. The station aired an urban contemporary format. Disc jockeys included Tom Joyner and LaDonna Tittle. Daddy-O Daylie hosted a Sunday jazz program. In 1980, the station began nighttime operations, running 5,000 watts using a directional array. In the late 1980s and early '90s the station simulcast the soft urban contemporary format of its sister station 106.3 WLNR in Lansing, Illinois, and was branded "Soft Touch". At noon on July 15, 1992, the station began airing an all-rap format.

=== 106 Jamz ===
In 1994, Johnson Publishing sold the station, along with 106.3 WJPC-FM, to Broadcasting Partners for $8 million. In June 1994, the station became "106 Jamz", airing an urban contemporary format as a simulcast of WJPC-FM. The station's call sign was changed to WEJM later that year, with its FM simulcast partner taking the call sign WEJM-FM. In the spring of 1997, the station was sold to Douglas Broadcasting for $7.5 million. In June 1997, its FM sister station left the simulcast, adopting an urban gospel format as 106.3 WYBA.

=== One-on-One Sports ===
On August 28, 1997, WEJM's format was changed to sports, as a One-on-One Sports affiliate. Around this time, the station was purchased by One-on-One for $10 million. In November 1997, the station's call sign was changed to WIDB. One-On-One was headquartered in suburban Northbrook. The One-on-One Sports affiliation moved to WJKL on March 1, 1999, though the One-on-One Sports format continued to simulcast on WIDB until May 1999.

=== WNTD ===
In 1999, the station was sold to Radio Unica for $16,750,000. In May 1999, the station began airing a Spanish-language news-talk format as Radio Unica. The station's call sign was changed to WNTD that month. Personalities heard on Radio Unica included Paul Bouche and Dra. Isabel, among others. Ricardo Brown was news director. In 2004, Multicultural Radio Broadcasting acquired Radio Unica's 15 radio stations for $150 million.

WNTD was the original affiliate of Air America Radio in Chicago. Program hosts included Al Franken, Randi Rhodes, Janeane Garofalo, Rachel Maddow, Lizz Winstead and Chuck D. The network launched on March 31, 2004. However, these programs ended after two weeks, on April 14, due to a payment dispute between Multicultural Radio Broadcasting, then owner of WNTD, and Air America Radio. On April 15, a judge ruled that Air America had fully paid for airtime on WNTD and ordered Multicultural to broadcast Air America on the station. However, Air America would only continue on the station through the end of the month. WNTD would return to airing a Spanish language format.

In 2007, the station was sold to Sovereign City Radio for $15 million. In October 2007, Relevant Radio began to air from 6 a.m. to 6 p.m. weekdays, while brokered Spanish language programming aired the remainder of the time.

From August 2009, until August 14, 2010, WNTD carried "Avenue 950", programmed by Sovereign City Radio Services, which featured an eclectic mix of jazz, blues, standards, and adult contemporary from 6 p.m. to 5 a.m. Relevant Radio continued to air during the remainder of the station's schedule. On August 15, 2010, the station began airing Relevant Radio full time.

In 2014, the station was sold to Starboard Media Foundation, Inc. for $14.4 million. The transaction was consummated on May 2, 2014.

=== WSFS ===
On February 23, 2026, the station's call sign was changed to WSFS.

== See also ==
- List of initial AM-band station grants in the United States
