= Jeff Coopwood =

American actor, singer, broadcaster, and educator (born 1958)

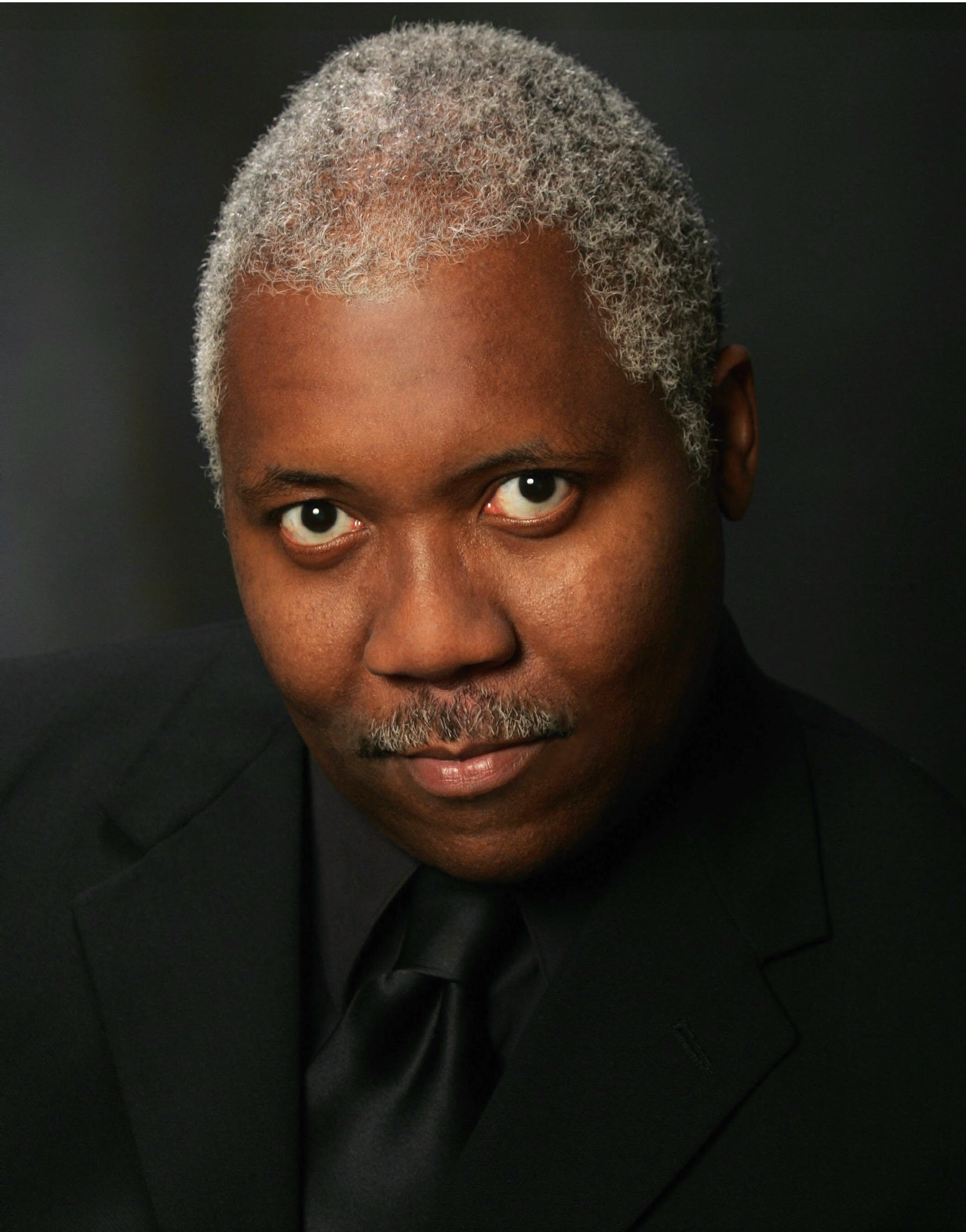
- Born: June 29, 1958 (age 68); Chicago, Illinois, U.S.
- Education: University of Miami (B.F.A.); University of California, Los Angeles; California State University, Dominguez Hills (M.A.)
- Occupations: Actor; singer; broadcaster; educator
- Years active: 1977–present

Jeff Coopwood (born June 29, 1958) is an American actor, singer, broadcaster and educator.

== Early life and education ==
Jeff Coopwood was born on June 29, 1958, in Chicago, Illinois, to Louise Riley and Jesse Coopwood. His mother was a former gospel radio broadcaster, and talk show hostess in markets from Chicago and Texas, to Miami, Florida. She had also been an actress, who understudied Eartha Kitt in "Mrs. Patterson" on Broadway and a model, charm school owner, and successful newspaper and magazine editor and publisher. For decades, his father, Jesse Coopwood, was a legendary jazz and talk radio broadcaster in Gary, Indiana.

Although born in Chicago, he grew up in Miami, Florida, where he attended Archbishop Curley High School and graduated from Miami High School. His senior year, he was named "Best Actor" in the state of Florida by the International Thespian Society. He was also a three-time state speech and debate champion and two-time national speech and debate finalist.

Coopwood graduated from the University of Miami, a private university in Coral Gables, Florida, with a Bachelor of Fine Arts degree in theatre. While obtaining a B.F.A., he also sang for four seasons with the Greater Miami Opera, now the Florida Grand Opera, where he performed with such international artists as Luciano Pavarotti, Jon Vickers, Cesare Siepi, James Morris, Dominic Cossa, Joanna Simon, Judith Blegen, Tatiana Troyanos, Renata Scotto, Mirella Freni, and Plácido Domingo, among many others.

== Career ==
Upon graduation, he appeared across the country in the Broadway National Tour of "Timbuktu!," starring the legendary Eartha Kitt, and subsequently starred in several major stage productions in theatres throughout the United States and Canada.

Coopwood went on to teach, coach and lecture in speech and debate at various high schools and colleges across the country, including Harvard University, Northwestern University, Georgetown University, Marquette University, and Emory University, as well as the University of Pennsylvania, the University of Chicago and the University of Miami. During his coaching career, his students won several regional, state and national championships in speech & debate at both the high school and college level, and he was twice named National Coach of the Year.

Upon his return to Chicago, he was the Emmy-nominated, original host of the $100,000 Fortune Hunt and also hosted Know Your Heritage, both nationally syndicated television game shows, airing primarily on Chicago television station and cable superstation WGN-TV.

Moving to Los Angeles, he studied broadcast journalism and television production at the University of California, Los Angeles. For several years, he was a regular host of the pledge drives for the PBS member television station in Los Angeles, KCET. He also obtained a Master of Arts degree, with distinction, from the California State University, Dominguez Hills, in Carson, California. As an alumnus, he has also hosted several public events for that alma mater.

== Star Trek and Star Wars voicework ==
His work has included stage, television, film, commercials, broadcasting, and a significant body of work doing voice-overs in television and feature films. He was nominated for a Primetime Emmy award for his voice-over work on the TNT television feature, Percy & Thunder, starring James Earl Jones and Courtney B. Vance. He is also a member of the Television Academy, formerly known as the Academy of Television Arts & Sciences.

Coopwood is one of the few performers to list work on both the Star Wars and Star Trek franchises among his credits. His most notable voiceover work includes voicing the role of the Borg, in the film Star Trek: First Contact. His voice was used for the film's Borg speech ending with the now iconic line, "Resistance is futile." His performance was digitally layered through multiple original takes to create the unique "Borg" effect.

He was also the voice of Captain Panaka in four Star Wars videogames: Star Wars: Episode I - The Phantom Menace; Star Wars: Galactic Battlegrounds, Star Wars: Obi-Wan and in addition to playing the role in Star Wars: Episode I: Battle for Naboo, he also voiced the game's narrator.

== Album ==
In 2020, Coopwood released a solo vocal recording called "Jeff Coopwood on Broadway."
