= Dick Buckley =

American radio presenter

- Born: George R. Buckley; August 26, 1924; Decatur, Indiana, United States
- Died: July 22, 2010 (aged 85); Oak Park, Illinois, United States
- Education: Indiana University
- Occupation: Radio Host
- Years active: 1956–2008
- Spouse: Marjorie A. Buckley
- Children: Janet Wayland, Jim Buckley, and Jeff Buckley

George R. "Dick" Buckley (August 26, 1924 – July 22, 2010) was an American radio presenter who had hosted the jazz program, Jazz with Dick Buckley, on Chicago Public Radio. His program, which was on WBEZ from 1977 through 2008, tended toward jazz of the 1930s and 1940s, or what he has called "Golden Era" jazz. In the early eighties, he also hosted a jazz program on WXFM. Buckley had previously been involved with jazz shows on WAIT, WNIB, and WAAF. Buckley was known for his rich baritone voice and encyclopedic knowledge of jazz.

== Early life and career ==
Dick Buckley was born in Decatur, Indiana on August 26, 1924. He grew up feeling that he was "the only jazz fan around." During World War II, he trained as a bombardier in San Angelo, Texas to serve in the United States Army Air Forces (USAAF) between 1943-'46. It was during his military career that he began his radio career. "Till I was 21 or 22, I wasn't aware my voice was exceptional. An Armed Forces station needed an announcer and said, `We'll give you experience.' That was the start."

He subsequently attended Indiana University where he played trombone for the marching band. At odds with his father, who wanted him to be an electrical engineer, he enrolled in a broadcasting school and remained in broadcasting thereafter. During broadcasts, he would occasionally refer to himself as "a reformed trombonist."

For a 1989 Sun-Times article by Bob Herguth, Buckley said "I grew up with radio. It was just that my tastes progressed to jazz bands. My mother, Ella May, who's 96 and lives in Plymouth Place in La Grange, still doesn't understand where she went wrong in my taste in music."

By 1986, Buckley was hosting his Sunday noon-4pm segment on WBEZ. Other jazz hosts for the station at that time were Neil Tesser and Barry Winograd, whom Buckley felt could ably and comfortably handle the playing of contemporary jazz, leaving him to play his favorites.

In 1988, satellite technology carried the unique voice of Buckley broadcasting live from the Chicago Jazz Fest, together with 17 other 'BEZ entities including Neil Tesser, and Richard Steele. Those live broadcasts were made from a trailer near Petrillo Music Shell, and were syndicated to over 150 radio stations, with listeners numbering as many as 10 million, estimated.

On 14 January 2007, Chicago Public Radio (WBEZ) made a major change to a talk, news and public affairs format, and Buckley's show was shortened from three hours to one hour, and on Sunday, 27 July 2008, he bid the airwaves farewell in his final broadcast, a two-hour special featuring guests and testimonials.

== Death ==
Buckley died on Thursday, July 22, 2010 at West Suburban Medical Center in Oak Park, Illinois from complications of pneumonia. He was 85.
