= LaDonna Tittle =

American radio personality, actress and model

- Born: March 13, 1946 (age 80); Chicago, Illinois, U.S.
- Education: Dunbar Vocational High School
- Alma mater: B.A. Chicago State University
- Occupations: Radio personality; DJ; actress; model
- Years active: 1971–present
- Known for: Radio personality – WBMX-FM, WJPC, WGCI-AM
- Spouse: Ronald Horton (m. 1967; died 1973)
- Website: cookingwithtittle.com

LaDonna Tittle (born March 13, 1946) is an American radio personality, actress and former model. Tittle is perhaps best known for her radio career from the mid–1970s until the early–2000s. Tittle most notable career stints were in Chicago at several stations; WBMX-FM, WJPC alongside Tom Joyner and WGCI-AM. From 2018 until 2020, Tittle had a recurring role as Ethel Brown in the Showtime television series The Chi.

== Biography ==
=== Early life and education ===
Tittle was born the oldest of five children to Juanita (née Wiley; c. 1922–2000) and James Olden Tittle in the Bronzeville neighborhood of Chicago, Illinois. Her mother owned a record shop and managed several businesses within the neighborhood. According to Tittle, Her mom served as part-time manager of WVON during the early 1960s. Her father was a businessman who owned several pool halls along East 47th street in the neighborhood. Sometime during her early childhood, Tittle and her brother attended school in Covert, Michigan. After her parents divorced in 1959, Tittle relocated to the Hyde Park neighborhood with her mother and siblings. As a child, Tittle sold candy at the Regal Theater during the late 1950s. During her teenage years, Tittle's family relocated to the Robert Taylor Homes public housing project; returning to the Bronzeville neighborhood. While a resident at Robert Taylor, Tittle began taking acting classes at the neighborhood club there. For high school, Tittle attended Dunbar Vocational High School; graduating in 1964. After high school, Tittle studied briefly at Loop College (now known as Harold Washington College) and later transferred to Chicago State University. At Chicago State University, Tittle majored in art education and drama with a minor in journalism; graduating in January 1971. Tittle was enrolled in the Master's of Art program at the Art Institute of Chicago shortly after graduating college but later dropped out.

=== Career ===
Prior to graduating college, Tittle began doing modeling work with Shirley Hamilton Talent Inc along with the Mannequin Guild of Chicago. While working for Shirley Hamilton, Tittle modeled for department stores such as Marshall Field's. Tittle was offered a position to do public service announcements for WBEE-AM located in Harvey, Illinois; beginning her radio career in February 1971. Tittle later became a permanent radio personality for the station, playing jazz from 1PM until 2PM. During a break in her time at WBEE, Tittle temporarily moved to Milwaukee, Wisconsin where she worked as a weekend radio personality at WNOV radio in 1972.

Tittle worked at WBEE radio station for two years, later returning to Chicago in May 1973. Shortly after returning to Chicago, Tittle became the midday and evening host of WBMX-FM radio, where R&B and soul music were showcased. Tittle started her career at the station reporting news and working overnight, eventually moving to weekday afternoons by 1974. Due to her growing popularity, Tittle was sought after by Johnson Publishing Company's WJPC radio station. They offered to double her salary, an offer she accepted in 1978. Tittle co-hosted alongside Tom Joyner and DJ Bebe D'Banana, and later JoJo Bell. In April 1979, Tittle was featured as JET magazine's "Beauty of the Week" while wearing bathing suit made out of the radio station bumper stickers. Tittle began hosting the midday show from 10AM until 3PM, naming it "Tittle In The Middle, Right In The Middle" by April 1982. Tittle worked at WJPC until the station was sold in December 1989. Thereafter, Tittle worked part–time at WNUA-FM, a blues and smooth-jazz radio station located in Joliet, Illinois in 1991. After a year at WNUA, Tittle landed full–time work for Chicago's WGCI-AM in 1992. For the first few years, Tittle worked between the FM and AM stations until automated overnight broadcasts came into play, which resulted in her being laid off in 2000.

After a year's hiatus from the public, Tittle launched The LaDonna Tittle TV/Radio Show on Chicago's CAN-TV in 2001. The show began as a platform to chat with entertainers until she decided to shift to cooking after viewing a soul food exhibit in 2003. Tittle also starred in R. Kelly's 2005 melodrama Trapped in the Closet, as Rosie the nosy neighbor. Tittle has received many Awards and Recognitions for her public community service, mentoring, educational self-esteem activities, and Culinary contributions. Tittle is "radio-act-tive"...

== Personal life ==
Tittle was married once and had no children. Her only marriage was to Ronald Horton, a Vietnam army volunteer from 1967 until his death in 1973. Tittle dated John E. Johnson of the Johnson hair-care product family from the late–1970s until his death in 1981.
