= KLAA (AM) =

- Orange, California; United States
- Broadcast area: Orange County, California; Southern California
- Frequency: 830 kHz
- Branding: Angels Radio AM 830

Programming
- Language: English
- Format: Sports radio
- Affiliations: Los Angeles Angels; ESPN Radio; Las Vegas Raiders; USC Trojans football

Ownership
- Owner: Los Angeles Angels; (LAA 1, LLC)

History
- First air date: January 9, 1986
- Former call signs: KSRT (1986–1991); KPLS (1991–2003); KMXE (2003–2006)
- Call sign meaning: Los Angeles Angels

Technical information
- Licensing authority: FCC
- Facility ID: 50516
- Class: B
- Power: 50,000 watts (day); 20,000 watts (night)
- Transmitter coordinates: 33°55′43.1″N 117°37′0.2″W

Links
- Public license information: Public file; LMS
- Webcast: Listen live
- Website: am830.net

KLAA (830 kHz "Angels Radio") is a commercial AM radio station licensed to the city of Orange, California, and broadcasting to the Greater Los Angeles Area. The station is owned by LAA 1, LLC, composed of the owners and executives of the Los Angeles Angels baseball team, and is held separately from the baseball club. KLAA's studios and offices are located within the second floor of the administration building of Angel Stadium in Anaheim, California.

KLAA's transmitter operates from a three-tower facility in Chino, off McCarty Road. It broadcasts as a full-power 50,000-watt station during the daytime from a single tower, using a non-directional signal. Because 830 AM is a United States clear-channel frequency, on which WCCO in Minneapolis is the dominant class A station, KLAA must reduce power to 20,000 watts from sunset to sunrise. At night it feeds power to all three towers in a directional pattern, projecting most of the signal westward to protect WCCO.

The station's legally-required identification at the top of the hour is read as "Orange County, Los Angeles and the Inland Empire"; though not identifying the community of Orange alone, it is a proper and legal identification as Orange is mentioned as the first word after the call letters.

KLAA mostly carries ESPN Radio network programing, as an alternate for primary station KSPN, except for coverage of Angels and Las Vegas Raiders games and a local afternoon sports show, The Sports Lodge with Roger Lodge.

== History ==
AM 830 first signed on the air on January 9, 1986, as KSRT, a Spanish-language news and information station. The station was directional day and night, with a daytime power of 2,500 watts and 1,000 watts night. Former NFL placekicker Danny Villanueva was co-owner and general manager. The transmitter site was at Oak Flat in the Santa Ana Mountains near Santiago Peak. While mountain tops are good for FM transmission, AM stations need low, flat land for the best signal propagation. The poor ground conductivity yielded a less-than-optimal signal for KSRT. (Today, KSRT is a Regional Mexican music station in Cloverdale, California.)

In 1991, the station changed its callsign to KPLS, and began airing a Spanish language talk radio format as "La Voz" in January 1992. On February 11, 1993, after a brief period of silence, the station switched to a children's radio format, becoming "Radio AAHS". It was part of the first nationwide network of radio programs for children. The downfall of Radio AAHS came when The Walt Disney Company established a competitor, Radio Disney. After the sign-off of Radio AAHS in January 1998, the parent company, Children's Broadcasting Corporation, needed programming for the network of stations until they could find buyers. KPLS and the other nine CBC-owned and operated Radio AAHS stations flipped to "Beat Radio", which broadcast electronic dance music 12 hours each night. (As of 2020, the KPLS call letters are used by a Christian radio-formatted station in Littleton, Colorado.)

KPLS was sold in late October 1998 to Catholic Family Radio and adopted a Catholic talk format. During this period, the station was owned by John Lynch, father of the veteran National Football League cornerback of the same name. Lynch was former CEO of Noble Broadcasting of San Diego.

In 2000 the station was granted a power increase by the FCC, allowing it to operate with 50,000 watts during the day and 20,000 watts at night, giving it a signal comparable to the major AM stations in Los Angeles. It also moved to its current tower site in Chino.

Despite the power increase, KPLS' programming foundered. It transitioned to a conservative talk radio format as "HotTalk 830 – LA's Conservative Voice" which featured nationally syndicated shows from Laura Ingraham and Michael Savage. KPLS had close ties to the Orange County business community and was the flagship station of the Anaheim Ducks hockey team.

In 2003, the station was sold to Radiovisa Corp. for $37.5 million. It flipped to KMXE, with a Spanish-language talk format. KMXE was the Angels' flagship station in that language. Its slogan was "¡Así Se Habla!" or "Well Said!" (KMXE is now an adult hits station near Billings, Montana.)

The station sold again in February 2006 for $42 million. The new owner was LAA1, LLC, headed by Angels Baseball owner Arte Moreno. The callsign switched to KLAA for Los Angeles Angels of Anaheim. The station added English-language programs in the summer of 2006 and gradually phased out Spanish-language shows except for some sporting events. The general talk format lasted from fall of 2007 to April 4, 2010, when the station went to full English-language programming, mostly sports talk, live sports and some paid programs. Talk show hosts included Rusty Humphries, Glenn Beck, Dr. Roy Masters and Michael Savage. The brokered shows included Ridin' Dirty, ROEX Health Show, which sold natural health remedies, and The American Advisor, which offered the sale of gold coins and bars.

On April 5, 2010, KLAA added additional programs from ESPN Radio, shows hosted by Scott Van Pelt and Doug Gottlieb, which were previously unavailable in the Los Angeles radio market. In exchange, KSPN agreed to simulcast about 60 Angels games in the 2010 season. KSPN replaced KFWB (980 AM) as the team's simulcast partner. KLAA carried some game broadcasts from ESPN Radio when KSPN could not air the games due to conflicts with a local team or talk show. Also heard on KLAA are the Anaheim Ducks, as well as additional sports talk shows. Weekend shows include programs about horse racing, bass fishing, motocross and NASCAR. Other talk shows include seasonal programs about the Angels and Ducks and a weekend interview program hosted by former Angel player and broadcaster Rex Hudler.

== Sports ==
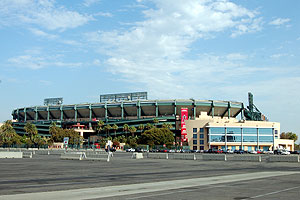
The KLAA studios are located within Angel Stadium in Anaheim, California.

In 2006–07, the station assumed the broadcast rights for the Anaheim Ducks of the National Hockey League. That team went on to win the Stanley Cup in June 2007. The partnership extended until the 2021–22 season; the next season, the Ducks chose to move their audio broadcasts exclusively to a team-focused online radio station, Ducks Stream, available via TuneIn, becoming the last California-based NHL to do so after the Los Angeles Kings and San Jose Sharks moved their broadcasts to online-only in 2018 and 2022, respectively,though the former has since returned to broadcast radio via KSPN for a reduced schedule of broadcasts.

In October 2007, the Angels announced that KLAA would carry Angels games in English starting with the 2008 season. Some Angels games had already been aired in English, the first of which was on September 16, 2006. The station aired the team's Saturday games during September and October when KSPN, the flagship from 2003 to 2007, carried USC Trojans football. Before that, it aired Angels games in Spanish, as well as some games of the pro soccer team the Los Angeles Galaxy, to fulfill contractual obligations to both teams. KLAA was believed to be the only station in the U.S. to broadcast play-by-play of sports events in two languages. (In 2008, Angels and Galaxy games in Spanish moved to KWKW, and the Dodgers relocated from KWKW to KHJ.)

On September 10, 2007, KLAA began carrying games of the NFL on Westwood One on Monday nights. However, it did not carry the full schedule because of some conflicts with the Ducks. KLAA aired selected NFL Sunday games in 2009

KLAA is the flagship station for UC Irvine Anteaters men's basketball.

In 2020, KLAA became the Los Angeles affiliate for the Las Vegas Raiders.
