= $100,000 Fortune Hunt =

Lottery game show for the state of Illinois

- Presented by: Jeff Coopwood (1989-1990); Mike Jackson (1990-1994) with Linda Kollmeyer
- Announcer: Bill Barber
- Country of origin: United States
- No. of seasons: 5

Original release
- Network: WGN (weekly)
- Release: 1989 – 1994

100,000 Fortune Hunt is an American lottery-based game show originating in the state of Illinois. It debuted on September 16, 1989, and aired on Saturday evenings from 1989 to 1994 on WGN-TV in Chicago (except for 1 year in 1993 when it aired on WBBM-TV); it was also broadcast on WGN's national satellite feed. Jeff Coopwood hosted the first season, with the rest of the run being hosted by Mike Jackson. Linda Kollmeyer served as the hostess during the entire run with Bill Barber as the announcer.

== Gameplay ==
Potential contestants purchased a $100,000 Fortune Hunt scratch-off ticket from an Illinois Lottery retailer. To play the $100,000 Fortune Hunt players had to rub off the play area on the lottery instant ticket. If three matching prize amounts were revealed, the player won the prize shown–such as a free ticket or up to $5,000. If three TV symbols appeared, players could submit the ticket to the lottery for a preliminary drawing. This drawing was held every week in Springfield.

At this first stage each week, six on-air contestants and 12 at-home viewers were selected from the preliminary drawing of entry tickets and asked to participate in the $100,000 Fortune Hunt. Only the first six contestants would appear on the TV show and have the opportunity to win the grand prize or other prizes. Two of the 12 at-home viewers were assigned to each of the six on-air contestants as partners.

While one of the six who appeared on the game show won the grand prize, his or her two home "partners" would win $500 each. Each of the remaining five on-air contestants would receive at least $1,000, and their partners would receive $100. During the TV show, the six contestants would face a game board with 36 numbered panels. Each panel would reveal a plus or minus dollar amount (scores could never go below zero); players would try to accumulate the most money by randomly selecting panels. There would be special panels such as bankrupt, lose a turn, wipeout, and double. The player who collects the highest prize amount after five rounds was declared the winner and received the $100,000 grand prize. The other contestants, one at a time, would then be given a choice to keep their total winnings or trade them for a choice of prizes (hidden behind 12 numbered panels). These ranged from cash amounts totaling between $1,000 and $10,000 to merchandise such as rooms of furniture, trips, a big screen television, a camcorder combo, and many others. These rules only lasted the first seven months the show was on the air. Afterwards, the losing contestants got to keep whatever money they earned in the game, with a minimum of $1,500 if they didn't have that much.

At the end of each show, hostess Kollmeyer drew six tickets at random from a revolving drum. The players who purchased those tickets were selected as the contestants for the next show.

Other spaces included:

- Bankrupt – The player who selected this lost his or her entire score; this space was signified by a dollar sign in a no symbol.
- Double – If the player uncovered a Double space, he or she immediately picked another number off the game board, winning double the amount revealed (if the player uncovered a minus dollar amount, they lost that amount of money and no more); this space was signified by a red star with the word DOUBLE written across it in capital letters.
- Lose a Turn – The player who selected this earned no money in that round; this space was signified by a sad face with the words "Lose a Turn" written at the bottom, which was later changed to the word TURN in a no symbol.
- Free Turn – The player who selected this earned a Free Turn token which he or she could redeem at any time for an additional selection from the board.
- Decision – The player who selected this could accept a prize (a brand new car in the first three rounds, and a luxury trip in the last two rounds) and resign from the game or pass on the prize and continue; this space was signified by a red star with a question mark over it (later in the run, this was changed to the word CAR or TRIP). Eventually, the trip was restricted to the consolation game, leaving the car the only prize offered in the main game.
- 1/2 Car – This spaced replaced "Decision" later in the run. This space was signified by the front of the car in the first three rounds, and the back of the car in the last two rounds; players had to find both the front and back halves in order to choose to claim the car or pass it up and continue (just like with "Decision").
- Wipeout – If the player selected it, they were eliminated from the game and left with only $1,000; the space was signified by a sad face. This space was removed after the first four episodes and was replaced with the "Lose a Turn" space as described above.

At the end of the game, the player in the lead won the $100,000. During the final season, the winner returned the following Saturday for up to five weeks. If the game ended in a tie, another round was played with the tied players, with the bigger dollar amount winning the game and the jackpot.

== Bonus play ==
On April 14, 1990, a new scratch-ticket was introduced with a new home-player rule. Each contestant would be designated with a letter from A-F from left to right. Later on, the contestants were also given letters from G-L, again from left to right. At the end of the show, home viewers would be given a chance to win $100 playing the at-home Bonus Play game. The winning contestant spun a wheel with 10 spaces numbered 0–9.

The winning number would consist of the $100,000 winner's letter(s) followed by a 4-digit number which the studio contestant created with four spins of the Bonus Play wheel.

Any home viewer whose Bonus Play ticket number matched the contestant's letter and the 4 digits in the order they were spun would win $100.

All Bonus Play tickets were good to last forever, so home viewers could keep them for the next drawing whether they were winners or not.

Sometime in the show's second season, the home player element was dropped from the show altogether.
