= KCZZ =

- Mission, Kansas; United States
- Frequency: 1480 kHz
- Branding: Dos Mundos Radio

Programming
- Format: Spanish music

Ownership
- Owner: Edward Reyes; (Reyes Media Group, Inc.)
- Sister stations: KDTD

History
- First air date: October 1957; 68 years ago
- Former call signs: KBKC (1957–1961); KBEA (1961–1995); KCAZ (1995–1998); KUPN (1998–2002)

Technical information
- Licensing authority: FCC
- Facility ID: 57120
- Class: B
- Power: 1,000 watts (day); 500 watts (night)
- Transmitter coordinates: 39°04′05″N 94°42′09″W

Links
- Public license information: Public file; LMS
- Webcast: Listen Live
- Website: dosmundosradiokc.com

KCZZ (1480 AM) is a radio station licensed to Mission, Kansas and serving the Kansas City Metropolitan Area market. The station is owned by Edward Reyes, through licensee Reyes Media Group, Inc.

== History ==
The station first signed on the air in October 1957 with the call sign KBKC. It was known as KBEA from 1961 to 1995. From 1995 to 1998, the station operated as KCAZ.

The station became the home of Radio AAHS, a format that featured children's programming and music, in November 1994. After Radio AAHS discontinued operations in January 1998, Children's Broadcasting Corporation, the station's owner, needed programming for the ten CBC-owned and operated Radio AAHS stations until it could find buyers. In February 1998, KCAZ, along with the other nine CBC stations, became an outlet for "Beat Radio", which broadcast electronic dance music 12 hours each night until late October 1998. Thee call sign changed to KUPN, which ran from 1998 to 2002. The current call sign, KCZZ, was adopted in 2002. On September 8, 2019, when ESPN Deportes Radio discontinued operations, the station flipped to a Regional Mexican format. In January 2020, KCZZ became the third station in the market at the time to air a Regional Mexican format, after KCTO flipped to Radio Maria. The station was sold to locally-based Reyes Media in 2020.
