= Cloverdale, Illinois =

- Unincorporated community
- Location within Illinois Location within the United States
- Coordinates: 41°56′22″N 88°07′13″W
- Country: United States
- State: Illinois
- County: DuPage
- Township: Bloomingdale
- Elevation: 768 ft (234 m)
- Time zone: UTC-6 (Central (CST))
  - Summer (DST): UTC-5 (CDT)
- ZIP code: 60103
- Area codes: 630 & 331
- GNIS feature ID: 421755

Cloverdale is an unincorporated community in Bloomingdale Township, DuPage County, Illinois, United States. Cloverdale is located near Old Gary Avenue and Army Trail Road, near Bloomingdale.

== History ==
From the late 1880s, Cloverdale was a milk stop on the Illinois Central Gulf railroad, and during the early 1900s, it was a stop on the Chicago, Dubuque, Sioux City and Omaha line of the Illinois Central Railroad.
