= KMAP (AM) =

- South St. Paul, Minnesota; United States
- Broadcast area: Eastern Twin Cities
- Frequency: 1370 kHz

Programming
- Format: Urban contemporary

Ownership
- Owner: KMAP Broadcasting

History
- First air date: July 1, 1965
- Former call signs: WMKT (1965–1970); KDAN (1970–1983)

Technical information
- Facility ID: 4708
- Power: 500 watts (day only)
- Transmitter coordinates: 44°52′39″N 92°58′40″W

KMAP (1370 AM) was an American radio station licensed to serve the community of South St. Paul, Minnesota, United States.

== History ==
The station was established on July 1, 1965 as WMKT, with a 500-watt daytime-only signal. In 1970, the station changed its call sign to KDAN and cycled through different formats (including country music, disco, jazz, and all news) before going bankrupt by 1983 and leaving the air. The station was carrying a country format at the time and was owned by Benita Soho of Los Angeles, doing business as Newport Broadcasting. The signal was dark for an extended period before signing back on as KMAP in early 1988.

The station was assigned the call sign "KMAP" by the Federal Communications Commission (FCC) on March 9, 1983. KMAP broadcast an urban contemporary format until July 1989 when it again went dark, and shortly after surrendered its broadcast license. The license was then cancelled by the FCC. The station's last documented owner was KMAP Broadcasting of Tampa, Florida
