= Jesse Coopwood =

American jazz radio broadcaster (1928–2001)

Jesse Coopwood (July 25, 1928 – December 7, 2001) was an American jazz radio broadcaster.

== Broadcaster ==
Once dubbed as having "the perfect voice for radio", Coopwood was a jazz and talk radio personality in Gary, Indiana, whose career spanned five decades. During that time, Coopwood appeared on several Gary radio stations, including WMPP, WGRY, WWCA and WLTH.

== Producer ==
He produced several jazz recordings of various artists for the Chance Records label. Also a union organizer and civil rights activist, Coopwood is included in the archives of The Civil Rights History Project in the Library of Congress.

== The Jackson Five ==
He emceed the first talent show in which the Jackson Five competed. They won first place and the newspaper clipping of their win, pictured with Coopwood, appeared on the back cover of the program distributed at the memorial service upon the death of Michael Jackson.

== Death ==
He died in 2001, in Gary, Indiana, at the age of 73.
