= Mammoth Spring (disambiguation) =

Mammoth Spring is a large karst spring in the U.S. state of Arkansas.

Mammoth Spring may also refer to:

- Mammoth Spring (Illinois), a water spring in DuPage County
- Mammoth Spring, Arkansas, a community
- Mammoth Spring State Park, Fulton County, Arkansas

== See also ==
- Mammoth Hot Springs, in Yellowstone National Park
- Mammoth (disambiguation)
