= Mastodon (disambiguation) =

A mastodon is a large, elephant-like mammal of the extinct genus Mammut (formerly Mastodon).

Mastodon or mastodont may also refer to:

== Animals ==
- Any non-elephantid member of Elephantimorpha, including "true mastodons" (Mammutidae), as well as gomphotheres, amebelodontids and choerolophodontids

== Software ==
- Mastodon (social network), open-source software for federated micro-blogging, similar to X

== Places ==
- Mastodon Township, Michigan

== Vehicles ==
- Mastodon (steam locomotive) (CPR #229), the very first steam locomotive of the 4-8-0 wheel arrangement
- A nickname for the 4-10-0 wheel arrangement

== Music ==
- Mastodon (band), an American heavy metal band
  - Mastodon (album), a box set released by the band's former label

== Comics and games ==
- Mastodon (Weapon X), a comic book character who plays a minor role in the backstory of Wolverine
- Mastodon (New Universe), the code-name of one of members of the DP7 comic book superhuman group
- Mastodon, a gigantic quadrupedal walker in the game Command & Conquer 4: Tiberian Twilight

== Sport and athletics ==
- Purdue Fort Wayne Mastodons, the athletic teams and mascot of Purdue University Fort Wayne

== See also ==
- Mammut (disambiguation)
- Mammoth (disambiguation)
- Elephant (disambiguation)
