= Mammoth (disambiguation) =

A mammoth is an extinct mammal and close relative to the modern elephant.

Mammoth also means "very large". It may also refer to:

== Mammoths ==
- List of mammoths
- Dwarf mammoth
- Woolly mammoth

== Places ==
- Mammoth Cave (disambiguation), several cave systems around the world named “Mammoth”
- Mammoth Creek (disambiguation)
- Mammoth Mountain (disambiguation)
- Mammoth Site (disambiguation)
- Mammoth Spring (disambiguation)

=== United States ===
==== California ====
- Mammoth Mountain Ski Area, a major ski area in Mono and Madera Counties, California
- Mammoth Cave, California, a former settlement in Calaveras County
- Mammoth Lakes, California, an incorporated town in Mono County

==== Other states ====
- Mammoth, Arizona, a town in Pinal County
- Mammoth, Missouri, a community in Ozark County
- Mammoth, Montana, a census-designated place in Madison County
- Mammoth, Pennsylvania, a community in Westmoreland County
- Mammoth, Utah, a semi-ghost town in Juab County
- Mammoth, West Virginia, a community in Kanawha County
- Mammoth, Wyoming, a community in Park County
- Mammoth Cave National Park, Kentucky
- Mammoth Glacier, Wind River Range, Wyoming
- Mammoth Hot Springs and Mammoth Hot Springs Historic District, Yellowstone National Park, Wyoming

== Media and culture ==
=== Theatre, film and television ===
- Mammoth (play), a 1990 Bulgarian play
- Mammoth (2006 film), a 2006 Sci Fi Channel movie
- Mammoth (2009 film), a 2009 Lukas Moodysson motion picture
- Mammoth (Zoids), a mecha from the fictional Zoids universe
- Mammoth, a fish in the American television series FishCenter Live
- Mammoth (TV series), a 2024 UK television series.

=== Music ===
- Mammoth Records, an American record label
- "Mammoth" (Interpol song), 2007
- "Mammoth" (Dimitri Vegas, Moguai and Like Mike song), 2013
- "Mammoth", a song by The Devil Wears Prada from their fourth full-length album Dead Throne
- "Mammoth", a song by Gothminister from their third full-length album Happiness in Darkness
- Mammoth, a 2011 album by Swedish progressive rock band Beardfish
- Mammoth, the initial name of the band Van Halen
- Mammoth (band), originally known as Mammoth WVH, a band founded by Wolfgang Van Halen and named in reference to his father's band

=== Literature ===
- Mammoth (comics), a DC Comics supervillain
- Mammoth (novel), a 2005 science fiction novel by John Varley

== Other uses ==
- Mammoet (Dutch for "mammoth"), a large heavy-haulage firm
- Mammoth, a brand of basketball systems made by Lifetime Products
- Mammoth (ride), a ProSlide water slide at Holiday World & Splashin' Safari in Santa Claus, Indiana
- Mammoth (shire), the largest horse on record
- Colorado Mammoth, a professional box lacrosse team
- Utah Mammoth, a National Hockey League team
- The Mammoth, a 1,400 pounds (640 kg) view camera made in 1900 by George Raymond Lawrence
- Mammoth, a fictional car and aircraft manufacturer in Grand Theft Auto V
- Mammoth was a 1996 helical scan tape drive for computer systems made by Exabyte Corp., and used 8 mm backup format tape cartridges

== See also ==
- Mammoth Mammoth, Australian band
- Mammouth, 2004 Canadian short film
- Mammut (disambiguation)
- Mastodon (disambiguation)
- Elephant (disambiguation)
