= Mammoth Site (disambiguation) =

Mammoth site may refer to:

- The Mammoth Site near Hot Springs, South Dakota
- Colby Mammoth Site near Worland, Wyoming, with specimens displayed at the University of Wyoming
- Hartley Mammoth Site, near Abiquiu, New Mexico
- Mammoth central, a paleontological site on the grounds of Santa Lucia Airport in Mexico
- Waco Mammoth Site, now the Waco Mammoth National Monument, Texas

== See also ==
- Mammoth (disambiguation)
- Mammoth Hot Springs
