= York Township, DuPage County, Illinois =

York Township
- Township
- Flag Seal

- Location in DuPage County

- DuPage County's location in Illinois
- Coordinates: 41°51′38″N 87°58′32″W
- Country: United States
- State: Illinois
- County: DuPage
- Established: November 6, 1849

Government
  - Supervisor: Timothy M. Murray

Area
  - Total: 35.64 sq mi (92.3 km^{2})
  - Land: 35.05 sq mi (90.8 km^{2})
  - Water: 0.59 sq mi (1.5 km^{2}) 1.66%
- Elevation: 715 ft (218 m)

Population (2020)
  - Total: 128,425
  - Density: 3,664/sq mi (1,415/km^{2})
- Time zone: UTC-6 (CST)
  - Summer (DST): UTC-5 (CDT)
- ZIP codes: 60126, 60137, 60148, 60181, 60515, 60521, 60523, 60559
- FIPS code: 17-043-83947
- Website: York Township

York Township is one of nine townships in DuPage County, Illinois, United States. As of the 2020 census, its population was 128,425 and it contained 53,543 housing units.

== Geography ==
According to the 2021 census gazetteer files, York Township has a total area of 35.64 square miles (92.31 km^{2}), of which 35.05 square miles (90.78 km^{2}) (or 98.34%) is land and 0.59 square miles (1.53 km^{2}) (or 1.66%) is water. The township lies at an elevation of approximately 715 feet (218 m) above sea level.

=== Cities, towns, and villages ===
- Downers Grove (partial)
- Elmhurst (vast majority)
- Glen Ellyn (east edge)
- Hinsdale (partial)
- Lombard (vast majority)
- Oak Brook (vast majority)
- Oakbrook Terrace
- Villa Park (vast majority)
- Westmont (north quarter)

=== Unincorporated communities ===
- Butterfield (mostly in Milton Township)
- Fullersburg (mostly in Downers Grove Township)
- Highland Hills at 41.849197°N 88.004509°W
- South Addison at 41.90503°N 87.988677°W
- Utopia at 41.851143°N 87.972839°W
- York Center at 41.856974°N 87.987842°W
- Yorkfield at 41.863364°N 87.948396°W

(This list is based on USGS data and may include former settlements.)

=== Landmarks ===
York Township contains several landmarks and institutions, including:

- Fullersburg Woods Forest Preserve
- Elmhurst University
- Mammoth Spring
- Midwestern University
- Oakbrook Center
- Yorktown Center

== Transportation ==
=== Major highways ===
- Interstate 88
- Interstate 290
- Interstate 294
- Interstate 355
- U.S. Route 20
- Illinois Route 38
- Illinois Route 56
- Illinois Route 83

=== Airports and heliports ===
- Chicago Bridge and Iron Heliport
- J. W. Scott Heliport
- McDonald's Plaza Heliport
- Official Airline Guides Heliport
- Waste Management Inc. Heliport
- Lombard Airport (historical)

== Natural features ==
- Mays' Lake (Mayslake Forest Preserve, Oak Brook)
- Trinity Lake (Oak Brook)
- Teal Lake (near Oak Brook Sports Core; along Salt Creek Greenway)
- Lake Fred (Oak Brook area; identified in DuPage County Flood Insurance Study)

== Cemeteries ==
York Township contains twelve cemeteries: Allerton Ridge Memorial Park, Babcock's Grove, Boeger, Brownswood, Chapel Hill Gardens West, college, Glos, Saint John's, Saint Mary's (Elmhurst), Saint Mary's (Lombard), Trinity Lutheran, and Zion Evangelical.

== Demographics ==
As of the 2020 census there were 128,425 people, 48,178 households, and 31,902 families residing in the township. The population density was 3,603.60 inhabitants per square mile (1,391.36/km^{2}). There were 53,543 housing units at an average density of 1,502.41 per square mile (580.08/km^{2}). The racial makeup of the township was 72.08% White, 4.23% African American, 0.40% Native American, 10.90% Asian, 0.02% Pacific Islander, 4.50% from other races, and 7.87% from two or more races. Hispanic or Latino of any race were 11.56% of the population.

There were 48,178 households, out of which 29.80% had children under the age of 18 living with them, 54.62% were married couples living together, 8.03% had a female householder with no spouse present, and 33.78% were non-families. 28.60% of all households were made up of individuals, and 14.70% had someone living alone who was 65 years of age or older. The average household size was 2.57 and the average family size was 3.22.

The township's age distribution consisted of 21.5% under the age of 18, 9.1% from 18 to 24, 25.4% from 25 to 44, 26.1% from 45 to 64, and 17.9% who were 65 years of age or older. The median age was 40.0 years. For every 100 females, there were 92.8 males. For every 100 females age 18 and over, there were 91.5 males.

The median income for a household in the township was $91,471, and the median income for a family was $116,108. Males had a median income of $64,552 versus $41,499 for females. The per capita income for the township was $49,386. About 3.1% of families and 5.5% of the population were below the poverty line, including 4.5% of those under age 18 and 6.1% of those age 65 or over.

Historical population
| Census | Pop. | Note | %± |
|---|---|---|---|
| 1950 | 43,362 | | — |
| 1960 | 89,988 | | 107.5% |
| 1970 | 119,291 | | 32.6% |
| 1980 | 120,470 | | 1.0% |
| 1990 | 120,546 | | 0.1% |
| 2000 | 124,553 | | 3.3% |
| 2010 | 123,449 | | −0.9% |
| 2020 | 128,425 | | 4.0% |
U.S. Decennial Census

== Education ==
- Elmhurst School District 205
- Westmont Community Unit School District 201
- DuPage High School District 88 (Willowbrook High School)

== Government ==
York Township was established in 1850 from land settled in 1849. The township seat is located in Lombard. The township government provides general assistance, property assessment, and road maintenance for unincorporated areas. The current Supervisor is Timothy M. Murray (elected 2025).

=== Political districts ===
- Illinois's 6th congressional district
- Illinois's 8th congressional district
- State House District 41
- State House District 42
- State House District 46
- State House District 47
- State Senate District 21
- State Senate District 23
- State Senate District 24

== See also ==
- DuPage County, Illinois
- List of townships in Illinois
