= Mammoth Mountain (disambiguation) =

Mammoth Mountain, Mount Mammoth or Mammoth Peak may refer to:

- Mammoth Peak, Yosemite National Park, California, U.S.
- Mammoth Peak, or Hewitt Peak, Kootenay National Park, British Columbia, Canada
- Mammoth Mountain, Inyo National Forest, California, U.S.
  - Mammoth Mountain Ski Area

== See also ==
- Mammoth (disambiguation)
