= Mammoth Spring (Illinois) =

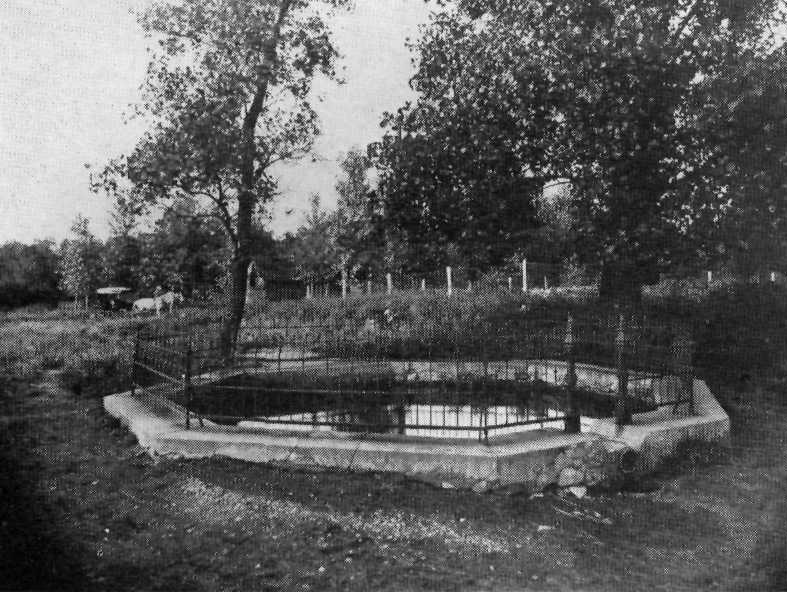
- The spring sometime before 1937 and before urban development

- Location within Chicago metropolitan area Location within Illinois
- Interactive map of Mammoth Spring
- Location: Oak Brook, Illinois
- Coordinates: 41°51′16″N 87°56′56″W

Mammoth Spring or Mammoth Springs is a water spring in York Township, DuPage County, Illinois, United States. It was used from 1861 to the early 20th century; the spot is now on the property of the DoubleTree hotel in Oak Brook near Elmhurst, Illinois.

It opened suddenly in 1861 on the Talmadge family farm, and was used until 1889 for irrigation. Around 1874, Mammoth Spring was described as "located in the highway, between lands owned by G.H. Talmadge and Robert Reed" and a drawing of the George H. Talmage farm, with a portion of the spring shown and labeled, appears in the same book. The road is named Spring Road because of the wooden conduit extended along it from the spring; a wooden conduit was constructed in 1889, and from 1889 to 1916, before being depleted, the spring supplied all of the water for nearby Elmhurst (including supplying the source water for the Elmhurst Spring Water Company) and some of the water for Oak Brook (including supplying the source water for the Mammoth Spring Ice Company).

Eventually artificial ice replaced natural ice, after which the Mammoth Spring Ice Company was sold in 1910. The City of Elmhurst took over the water supply from the Elmhurst Spring Water Company in 1916, and drilled its own wells as well; Mammoth Spring was abandoned as a water source for Elmhurst sometime between 1918 and 1927. The spring's original trough was destroyed when Spring Road was widened in 1979.

== See also ==
- Fullersburg, Illinois — at which was the Mammoth Spring Ice House
- Salt Creek (Des Plaines River tributary)
