= Mammut (disambiguation) =

Mammut ( German for mammoth) may refer to:

- Mammut, the genus of the extinct mastodon, an elephant relative
- Mammut, roller coaster in Gardaland
- Mammut radar, a German radar
- Mammut Sports Group, a Swiss sports group
- a roller coaster in the German theme park Erlebnispark Tripsdrill
- Mammút, Icelandic indiepop and rock alternative band
- Original name for the 2009 movie Mammoth

== See also ==
- Mammoth (disambiguation)
- Mastodon (disambiguation)
- Elephant (disambiguation)
