= Orange Mound Spring =

Hot spring in Yellowstone National Park

Coordinates: 44.9664°N 110.7148°W

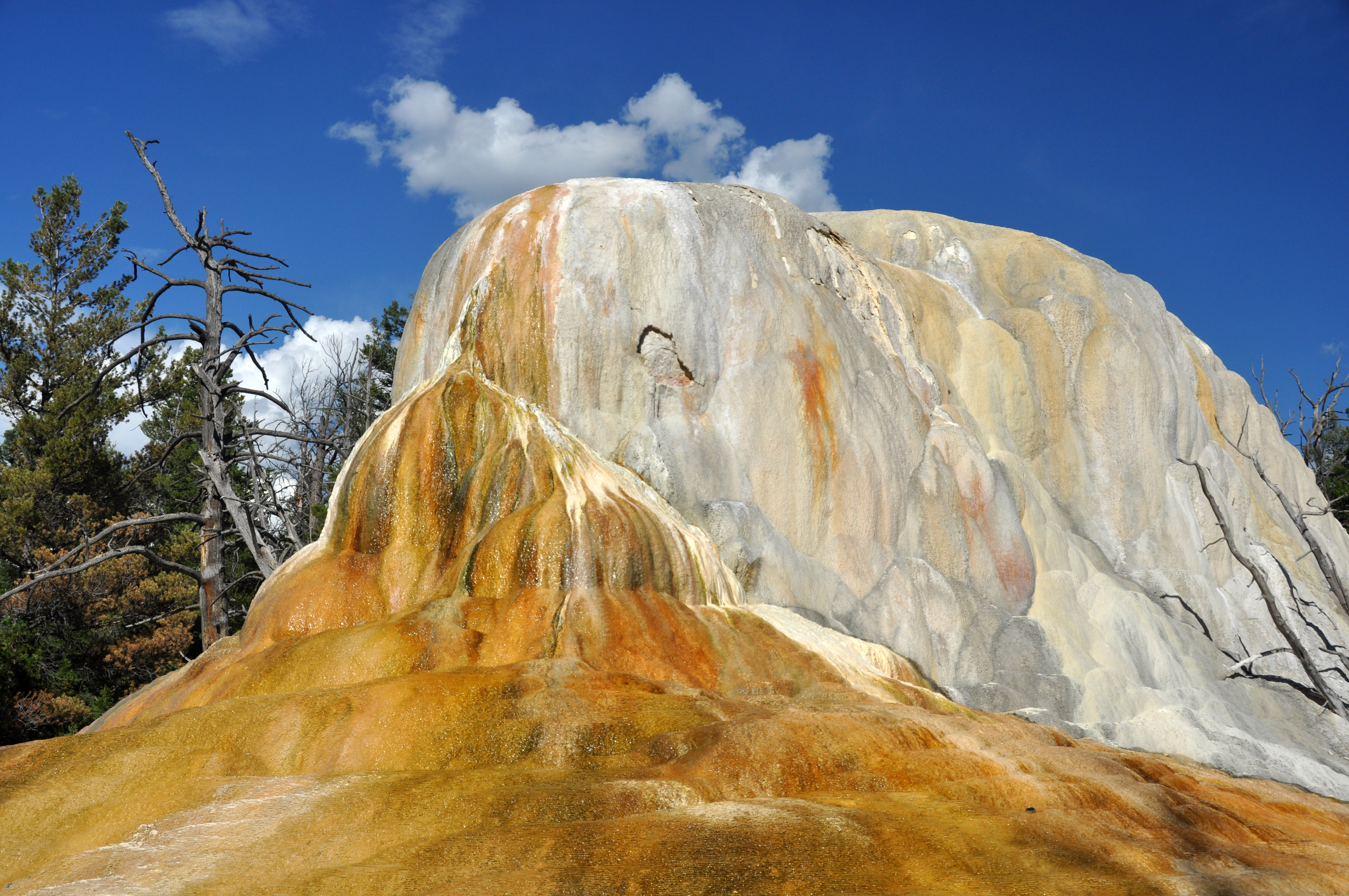
- Orange Mound Spring, Yellowstone
- Interactive map of Orange Mound Spring
- Location: Mammoth Hot Springs, Yellowstone National Park
- Temperature: 170 °F (77 °C)

Orange Mound Spring is one of the several hot springs in Yellowstone National Park. The name comes from its dark orange appearance caused by orange cyanobacteria living on the travertine, the rock that it is made of. The Orange Mound Spring is part of the Mammoth Hot Springs area of the park. The Orange Mound Spring is arguably most notable for its prominence above the ground, compared to the rest of the Mammoth Hot Springs, which are mostly flat and leveled terraces. It was named by early Yellowstone assistant superintendent and guide, G.L. Henderson.

== Flow, age and color ==
The Orange Mound Spring is thermally cooler (~170˚F) than most springs in Yellowstone and at the Mammoth Hot Springs themselves, allowing the orange-tinted cyanobacteria to thrive and color the spring a darker shade of orange than the rest of the Mammoth Terraces. Depending on the nutrients that the bacteria receive, the color may change throughout the year.

The Spring is said to be very old due to the shape and size of the mound as well as how little water flows out of the spring itself. It has created other nearby cone-shaped springs from itself due to the travertine deposits wearing away.

Often in the Mammoth Hot Springs, flow will turn on and off, so on some days it may have no flow at all, and others it may have a lot.
