= Mastodon (steam locomotive) =

Steam locomotive

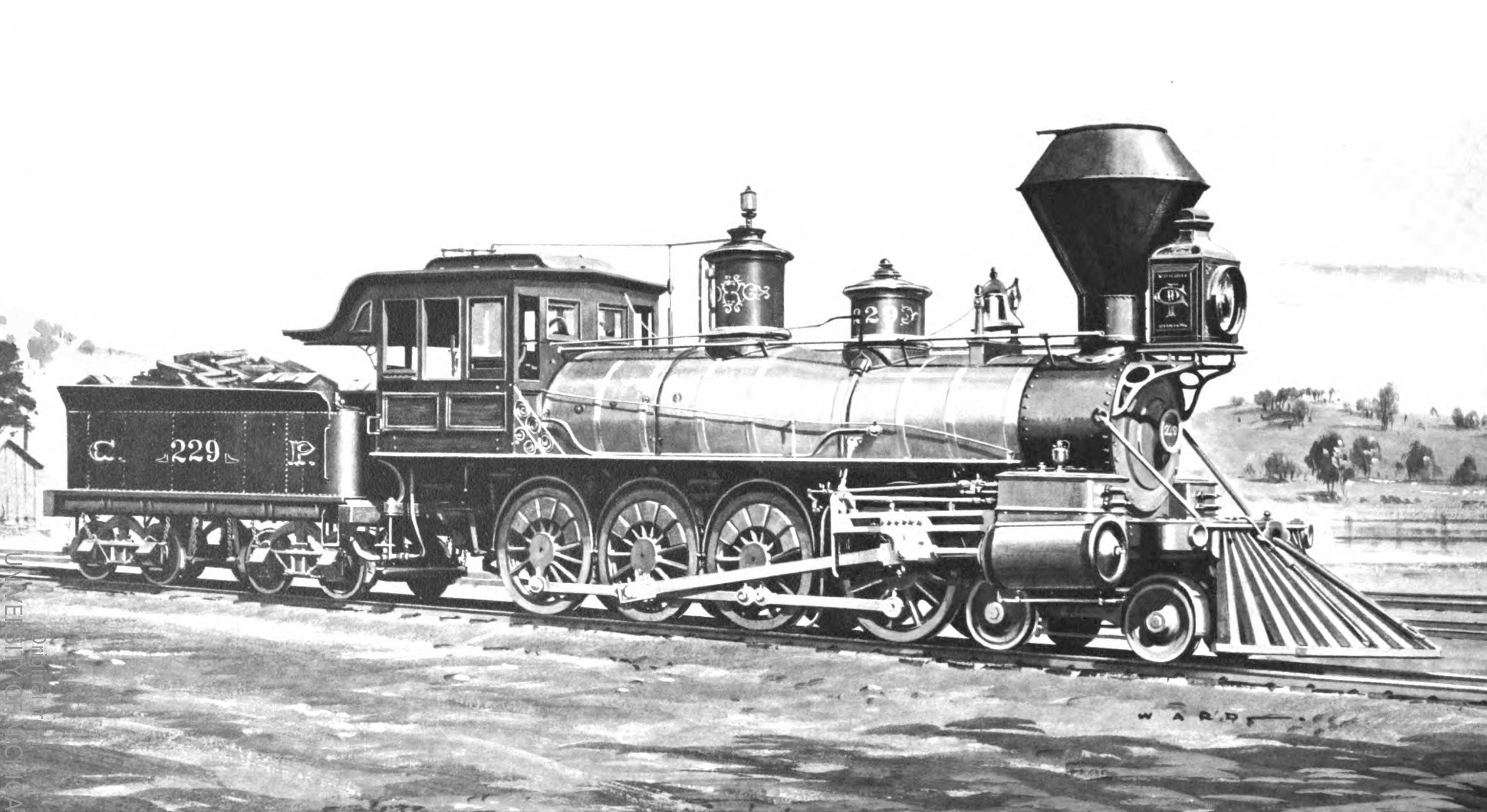
- CPR #229, Mastodon, as she would have appeared in about 1885
Type and origin
- Power type: Steam
- Builder: Central Pacific's Sacramento, California, shops
- Serial number: 20
- Build date: April 1882
Specifications
- Configuration
  - Whyte: 4-8-0
- Gauge: 4 ft 8 1/2 in (1,435 mm) standard gauge
- Driver dia.: 55 in (1,397 mm)
- Adhesive weight: 81,000 lb (37,000 kg)
- Loco weight: 105,850 lb (48,010 kg)
- Fuel capacity: 10,700 lb (4,900 kg)
- Water cap.: 2,500 US gal (9,500 L; 2,100 imp gal)
- Boiler pressure: 135 psi (930 kPa)
- Heating surface: 1,355.3 sq ft (125.91 m^{2})
- Cylinder size: 19 in × 30 in (483 mm × 762 mm) dia × stroke
Performance figures
- Tractive effort: 22,595 lbf (100,510 N)
Career
- Operators: Central Pacific, Southern Pacific
- Numbers: 229; renum. 1950 in 1891; renum. 2800 in 1901; renum. 2925 in 1906
- Nicknames: Mastodon
- First run: April 1882
- Scrapped: June 29, 1935, Brooklyn shops, Portland, Oregon

Mastodon was the unofficial name of the Central Pacific Railroad's number 229, the world's first successful 4-8-0 steam locomotive.

== History and career ==
The engine was designed and built by the road's master mechanic, Andrew Jackson "A.J" Stevens at Sacramento Locomotive Works in 1882. The locomotive had two highly unusual features: the firebox shape and the steam distribution.

The rear end of the firebox was depressed so that the outer shell was below the water level, leaving no clear steam space. The roof was sloped down towards the back so that steam bubbles would flow forward till they reached the upper vertical part of the backplate which was in two pieces. The fire-hole door was in the lower backplate. The firebox was very long, 13 ft 4 3/4 in (4.08 m) to the tubeplate, the grate being 9 ft (2.74 m) long. It is not clear what object Stevens had in mind when having this abnormal construction, which must have been costly to build and maintain: it did give more room in the cab. The special valve gear operated four slide valves for each cylinder, two of which were worked by Stephenson valve gear, but used for reversing only, and two more, on top of the first two, for controlling the cutoff, these being operated by a third eccentric through a rocking lever with a sliding block on one arm. The use of a double valve gear is reminiscent of Centipede, but separate valves for each end of the cylinder were novel on a locomotive. This valve gear gave very good steam distribution even at short cut-offs; short as understood for a saturated-steam engine with a boiler pressure low by modern standards. At long cut-off and a speed of 8 miles per hour (13 km/h) the indicated mean effective pressure was 124 lb/sq in (8.5 bar), which is over 91 per cent of the boiler pressure of 135 lb/sq in (9.3 bar), that is to say more than the 85 per cent normally used to calculate the tractive effort at starting.

The only other locomotives to use such a valve gear were the 20 copies of Mastodon (see below) and CPR #237 El Gobernador. All other steam locomotives with slide valves had just a single valve in the center.

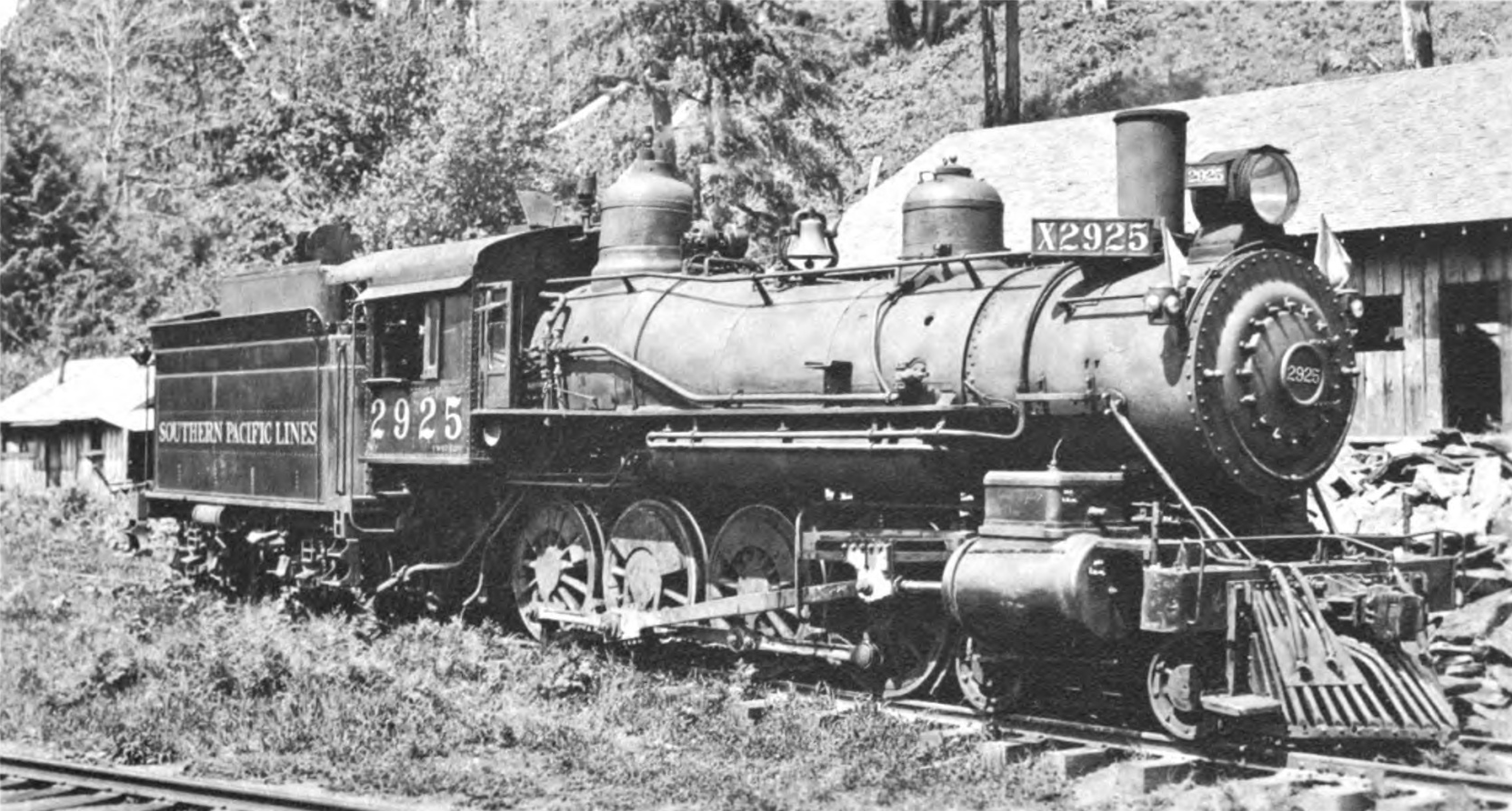
CPRR 229, now rebuilt and renumbered as SPRR 2925, sits at Wakefield, Oregon, near the end of its life.

After being readied for its initial run, the engine had a minor accident where its large "balloon" stack was knocked off the smokebox. It was later discovered that the stack was nearly one foot (30 cm) taller than the roundhouse doors. The problem was fixed and an impressive series of trials on the steep grades of the Sierra Nevada soon followed, in which it easily outperformed the smaller 4-4-0 and 4-6-0 engines used by the railroad at the time. Later, Mastodon was sent east to the Cooke Locomotive and Machine Works, along with blueprints and men who had built the engine, where more than 20 copies were produced; these were identical except for having their cylinder bore increased from 19 inches (483 mm) to 20 inches (508 mm). The engine's success inspired railroad president Leland Stanford to instruct Stevens to build an even larger locomotive, which would be the largest in the world had at that time. This engine, a 4-10-0 named El Gobernador (CPRR #237), looked virtually identical to Mastodon with the exception of being longer and having an additional pair of driving wheels. However this engine, unlike its predecessor, was a failure and was scrapped in 1894.

Sometime in the early 20th century, No. 229 (now renumbered as Southern Pacific 2925) was converted from wood to oil-firing and was later assigned to the Oregon lines. Despite its historical significance, the engine was broken up for scrap at the Brooklyn Shops in Portland, Oregon, in June 1935 after a working life of 53 years.

== See also ==
- Expansion valve
