= El Gobernador =

American locomotive, built 1883

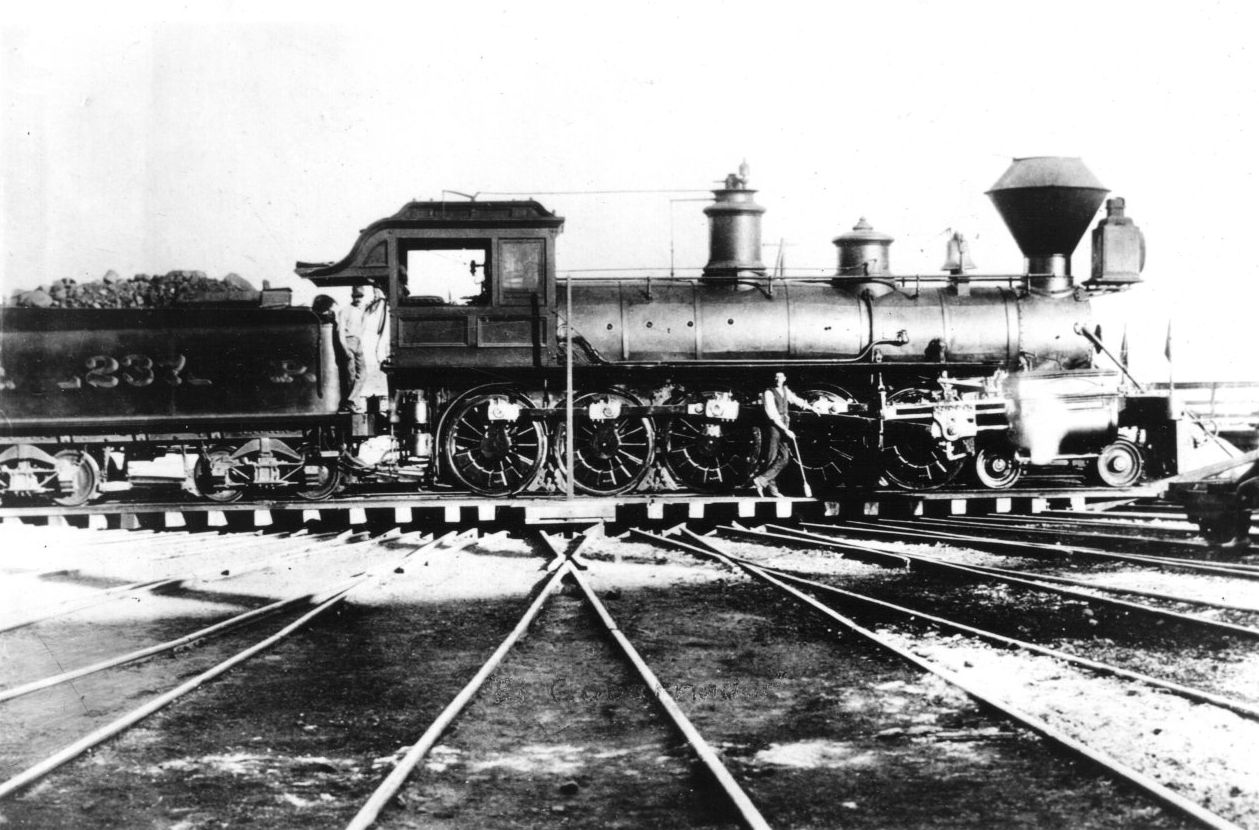
- Central Pacific Railroad No. 237 El Gobernador
Type and origin
- Power type: Steam
- Builder: Central Pacific's Sacramento shops
- Serial number: 21
- Build date: February 1883
Specifications
- Configuration
  - Whyte: 4-10-0
  - UIC: 2′E n2g
- Gauge: 4 ft 8 1/2 in (1,435 mm) standard gauge
- Driver dia.: 57 in (1,448 mm)
- Adhesive weight: Original: 128,000 lb (58,000 kg; 58 t); Rebuilt: 121,600 lb (55,200 kg; 55.2 t)
- Loco weight: Original: 146,000 lb (66,000 kg; 66 t); Rebuilt: 154,400 lb (70,000 kg; 70.0 t)
- Boiler pressure: 140 lbf/in^{2} (970 kPa)
- Cylinder size: 21 in × 36 in (533 mm × 914 mm)
Performance figures
- Tractive effort: 33,150 lbf (147.5 kN)
Career
- Operators: Central Pacific, Southern Pacific Railroad
- Numbers: 237, renum. 2050 in 1891
- Official name: El Gobernador
- First run: March 1884
- Scrapped: July 15, 1894

El Gobernador was an American 4-10-0 steam locomotive built by Central Pacific Railroad at the railroad's Sacramento, California shops. It was the last of Central Pacific's locomotives to receive an official name and was also the only locomotive of this wheel arrangement to operate on United States rails. El Gobernador was the largest steam locomotive in the world when it was built. Its name is reminiscent of the railroad's first locomotive, Gov. Stanford, as El Gobernador is Spanish for The Governor. This locomotive is a Mastodon type. Confusingly, this was the unofficial name for an earlier engine, "Mastodon" No. 229, the first successful 4-8-0 ever built. Both engines looked nearly identical, except that El Gobernador was longer and had an additional pair of drivers.

== Construction and operation ==
El Gobernador's construction was completed in February 1883, amid much fanfare from the railroad, but it did not enter service until March 1884, just over a year later. During this time, while still in Sacramento, the gigantic engine was used as an advertising tool by the railroad, to spectacular effect. According to author Guy L. Dunscomb, the engine was kept under steam near the Central Pacific's passenger depot, where it would await the arrival of passenger trains coming in from the east. As the train arrived, El Gobernador would steam past the depot dragging a long line of empty freight cars behind it and causing quite a stir in the process. The engine would then be uncoupled and placed on adjacent trackage, where the passengers could get a good close-up look at the locomotive.

Part of the delay between construction and operation was due to the railroad's track and infrastructure of the time. It was originally designed to haul trains out of California's San Joaquin Valley via Tehachapi Loop. The locomotive was disassembled into five large subassemblies for transportation to the pass because it was thought to be too heavy for the various bridges along the route to the pass.

Operationally, the locomotive did not fare as well as was hoped due to its large cylinder size and small fire grate area (one fireman even commented in anger, "All Hell couldn't keep steam up in that engine!"). During initial shakedown runs around Sacramento, it was found, for example, that the engine's cylinders, which were originally built with innovative rotary valves, were not working properly. This necessitated casting an all-new set of cylinders with conventional slide valves and Stephenson valve gear. Central Pacific attempted to further remedy the problems in an 1885 rebuild which increased the locomotive's weight to 154,400 lb (70,000 kg), with 121,600 lb (55,200 kg) on the drivers. It was during this time that coal was apparently tried as a fuel in an effort to gain better steam economy. Several photographs exist of the locomotive in the Kernville yard, its tender loaded with coal instead the usual cord wood.

In the railroad's 1891 renumbering plan, El Gobernador received road number 2050. The rebuild was not as successful as the railroad hoped and the locomotive was scrapped on July 15, 1894. After dismantling, the engine's massive boiler was used to provide steam for stationary engines in the railroad shops at Sacramento until scrapped in 1905. However, the boiler from the locomotive is likely still in existence and was used as yard embankment fill near the Sacramento River that is nearest to the old shops, now owned by the California State Railroad Museum

This engine appears to have largely been a victim of impatience on the part of the railroad's president, Leland Stanford. A locomotive this size had never been constructed before and proved to be a unique engineering challenge. For example, the engine's frame alone was so large, that it had to be cast in two separate sections instead of all at once as with other locomotives built at Sacramento. As soon as master mechanic A. J. Stevens was able to figure out a part, Stanford would order it built and installed on the new engine, without giving any proper time for testing. Stanford also apparently kept the other members of The Big Four (minus Mark Hopkins, who had died several years before) in the dark about the project as well. Once, while Stanford was away, Charles Crocker came through the locomotive works on a tour of inspection and saw the partially completed El Gobernador under construction. Having not been told about the project, he angrily demanded to know what they were up to. When told by A. J. Stevens that they were attempting to build the largest engine in the world, Crocker ordered all work stopped immediately. Meanwhile, Stanford returned to find that no new work had been done on the engine and when informed of the events that transpired, Crocker's orders were countermanded in no uncertain terms.

== Bibliography ==
- Diebert, Timothy S.; Strapac, Joseph A. (1987). Southern Pacific Company Steam Locomotive Conpendium. Shade Tree Books. ISBN 0-930742-12-5.
- Southern Pacific Railway Shops. Retrieved January 21, 2006.
