= Mammoth Creek =

Mammoth Creek may refer to:

- Mammoth Creek, the upper part of Hot Creek in Mono County, California, United States
- Mammoth Creek (Utah), tributary of the Sevier River in Iron and Garfield counties in Utah, United States
