= Fullersburg, Illinois =

Fullersburg Brush Hill
- Unincorporated community
- Location within Chicago metropolitan area Location within Illinois
- Coordinates: 41.818087°N 87.918394°W
- Country: United States
- State: Illinois
- County: DuPage
- Township: Downers Grove, York
- Founder: Orente Grant in 1833 founded settlement of Brush Hill; Benjamin Fuller in 1851 renamed town Fullersburg
- Elevation: 663 ft (202 m)
- Time zone: UTC-6 (Central (CST))
  - Summer (DST): UTC-5 (CDT)
- GNIS feature ID: 1771758
- (In contrast to historic descriptions, the GNIS coordinates may be erroneously to the east of, or at the far east edge of, historical Fullersburg.)

Fullersburg is a former village in Downers Grove Township and York Township, DuPage County, Illinois near the Cook County border. Though never incorporated in its own name, the area is historically important to the development of Hinsdale and Oak Brook, Illinois.

The area was originally called Brush Hill and was claimed by Orente Grant when the Indian land in Illinois was ceded to the United States government in the 1833 Treaty of Chicago. Benjamin Fuller, of Broome County, New York, arrived in 1835 with his parents Jacob and Candace Fuller and some other relatives, and settled at Ginger Creek at what later became Spring Road in Oak Brook. (Note: This appears to be the areas that are now Hamburger University and Kensington Road in survey section 26 in Oak Brook: Before the McDonald's campus, Spring Road continued through, along what is now the section of Ronald Lane east of what is now Hamburger University.) Ben Fuller built a house in 1840 on what is now York Road. (By 1985, this Fuller House had moved into the Fullersburg Woods Forest Preserve from its original location.) By 1851, he owned most of the area, and in 1851 subdivided and platted; the name changed from Brush Hill to Fullersburg.

== See also ==
- Graue Mill
