= 4-10-0 =

Locomotive wheel arrangement

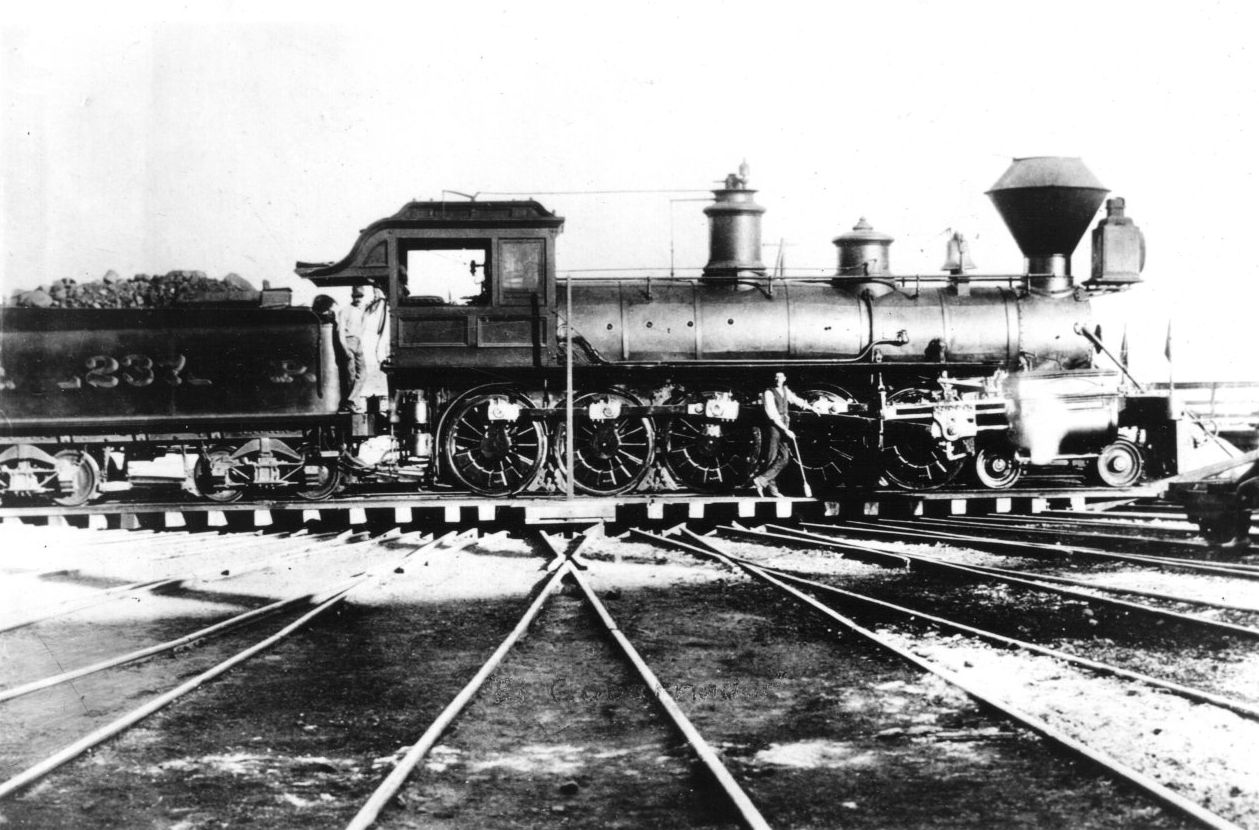
El Gobernador, the only 4-10-0 locomotive to operate in the United States

Under the Whyte notation for the classification of steam locomotives, 4-10-0 represents the wheel arrangement of four leading wheels, ten powered and coupled driving wheels, and no trailing wheels. Central Pacific Railroad's El Gobernador, built in 1883, was the only locomotive with this wheel arrangement to operate in the United States. The name "Mastodon" has also been applied to this type, though this nickname has also been mistakenly used for the 4-8-0 arrangement (Mastodon was the unofficial nickname of the Central Pacific's No. 229, the first 4-8-0 ever built), leading to some confusion. Sources refer to the 4-8-0 as the Twelve-wheeler. Later, these locomotives were named "Super Mastodon's."

The Bulgarian State Railways operated a group of 3-cylinder 4-10-0s, their class 11.

Other equivalent classifications are:

- UIC classification: 2E (also known as German classification and Italian classification)
- French classification: 250
- Turkish classification: 57
- Swiss classification: 5/7
