= Mammoth Hot Springs =

Hot spring complex in Yellowstone National Park, Park County, Wyoming, U.S.

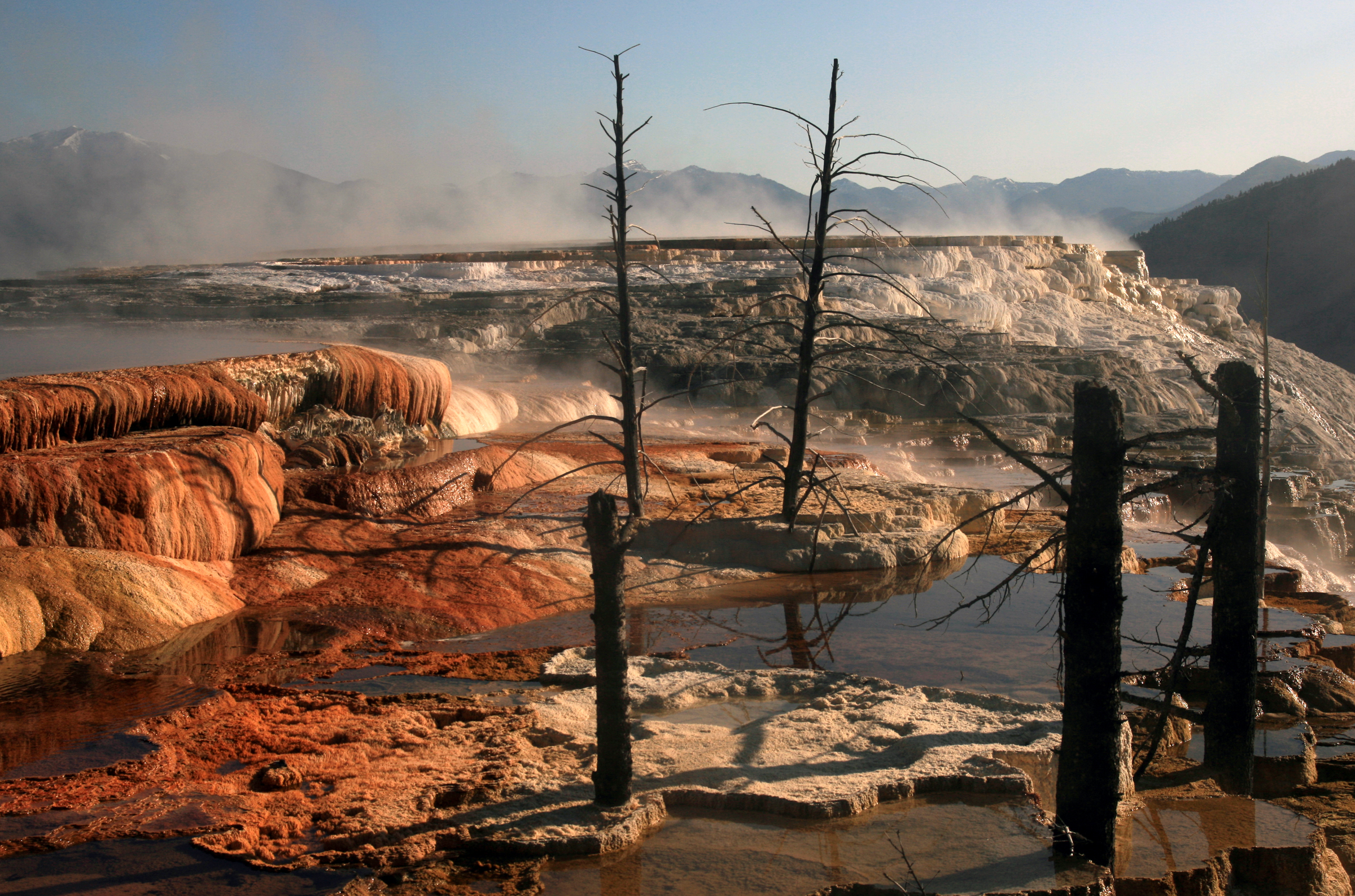
- Dead Trees at Mammoth Hot Springs
- Interactive map of Mammoth Hot Springs
- Location: Mammoth Hot Springs, Yellowstone National Park, Park County, Wyoming
- Coordinates: 44°58′01″N 110°42′44″W
- Elevation: 6,735 feet (2,053 m)
- Type: Hot spring complex

Mammoth Hot Springs is a large complex of hot springs on a hill of travertine in Yellowstone National Park adjacent to Fort Yellowstone and the Mammoth Hot Springs Historic District. It was created over thousands of years as hot water from the spring cooled and deposited calcium carbonate (over two tons flow into Mammoth each day in a solution). Because of the huge amount of geothermal vents, travertine flourishes. Although these springs lie outside the caldera boundary, their energy has been attributed to the same magmatic system that fuels other Yellowstone geothermal areas.

The hot water that feeds Mammoth comes from Norris Geyser Basin after traveling underground via a fault line that runs through limestone and roughly parallel to the Norris-to-Mammoth road. The limestone from rock formations along the fault is the source of the calcium carbonate. Shallow circulation along this corridor allows Norris's superheated water to slightly cool before surfacing at Mammoth, generally at about 170 °F (80 °C). Algae living in the warm pools have tinted the travertine shades of brown, orange, red, and green.

Thermal activity here is extensive both over time and distance. The thermal flows show much variability with some variations taking place over periods ranging from decades to days. Terrace Mountain at Mammoth Hot Springs is the largest known carbonate-depositing spring in the world. The most famous feature at the springs is the Minerva Terrace, a series of travertine terraces. The terraces have been deposited by the spring over many years but, due to recent minor earthquake activity, the spring vent has shifted, rendering the terraces dry.

The Mammoth Terraces extend all the way from the hillside, across the Parade Ground, and down to Boiling River. The Mammoth Hotel, as well as all of Fort Yellowstone, is built upon an old terrace formation known as Hotel Terrace. There was some concern when construction began in 1891 on the fort site that the hollow ground would not support the weight of the buildings. Several large sink holes (fenced off) can be seen out on the Parade Ground. This area has been thermally active for several thousand years.

The Mammoth area exhibits much evidence of glacial activity from the Pinedale Glaciation. The summit of Terrace Mountain is covered with glacial till, thereby dating the travertine formation there to earlier than the end of the Pinedale Glaciation. Several thermal kames, including Capitol Hill and Dude Hill, are major features of the Mammoth Village area. Ice-marginal stream beds are in evidence in the small, narrow valleys where Floating Island Lake and Phantom Lake are found. In Gardner Canyon one can see the old, sorted gravel bed of the Gardner River covered by unsorted glacial till.

== Gallery ==
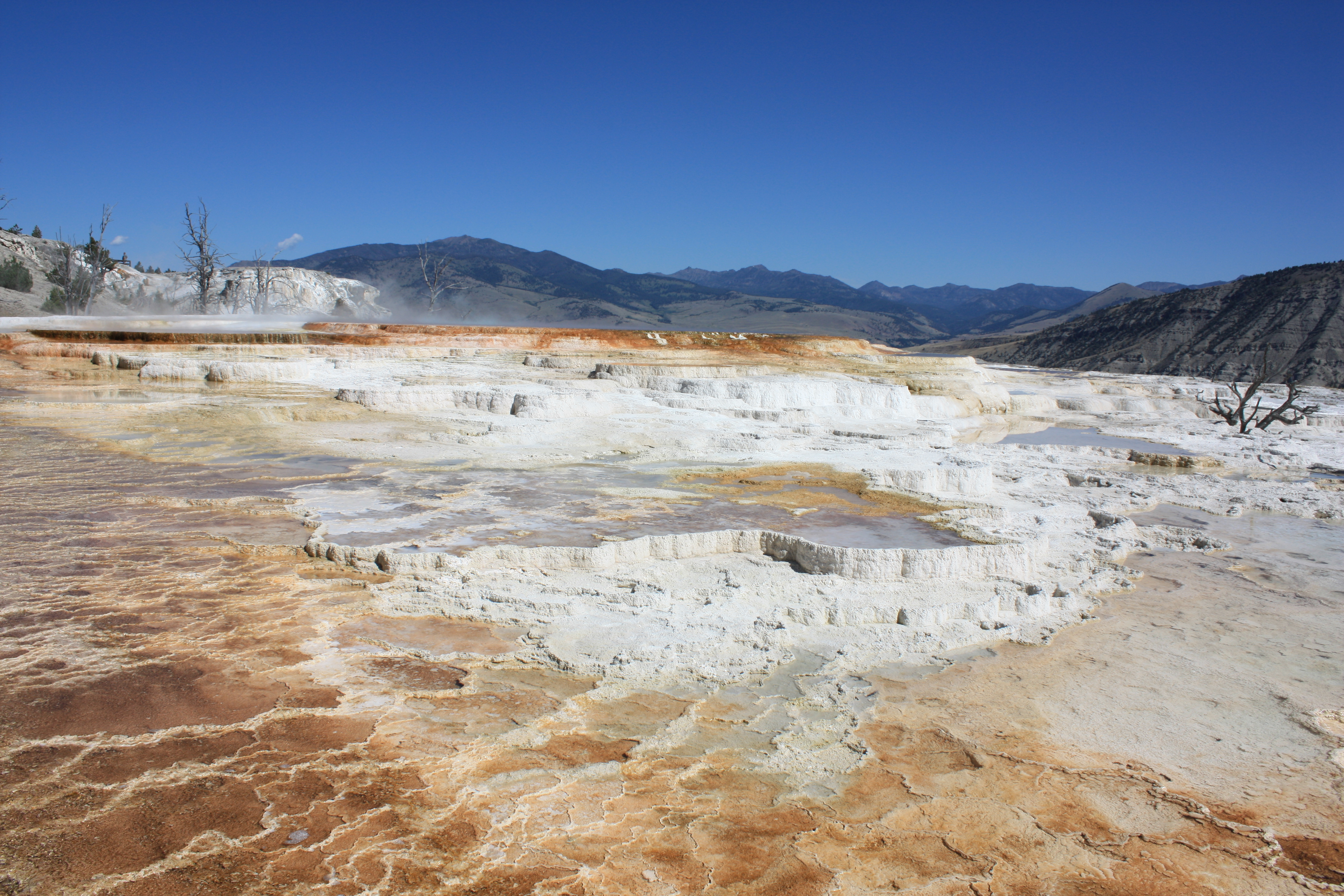
Crystallized calcium carbonate terraces

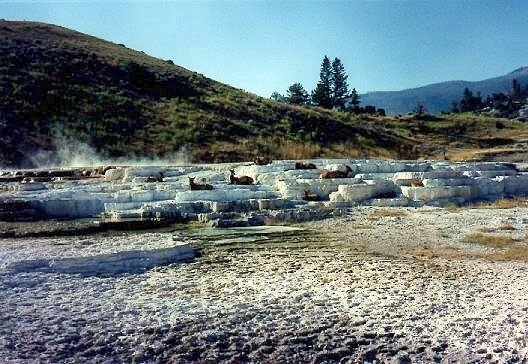
Elk on travertine terraces

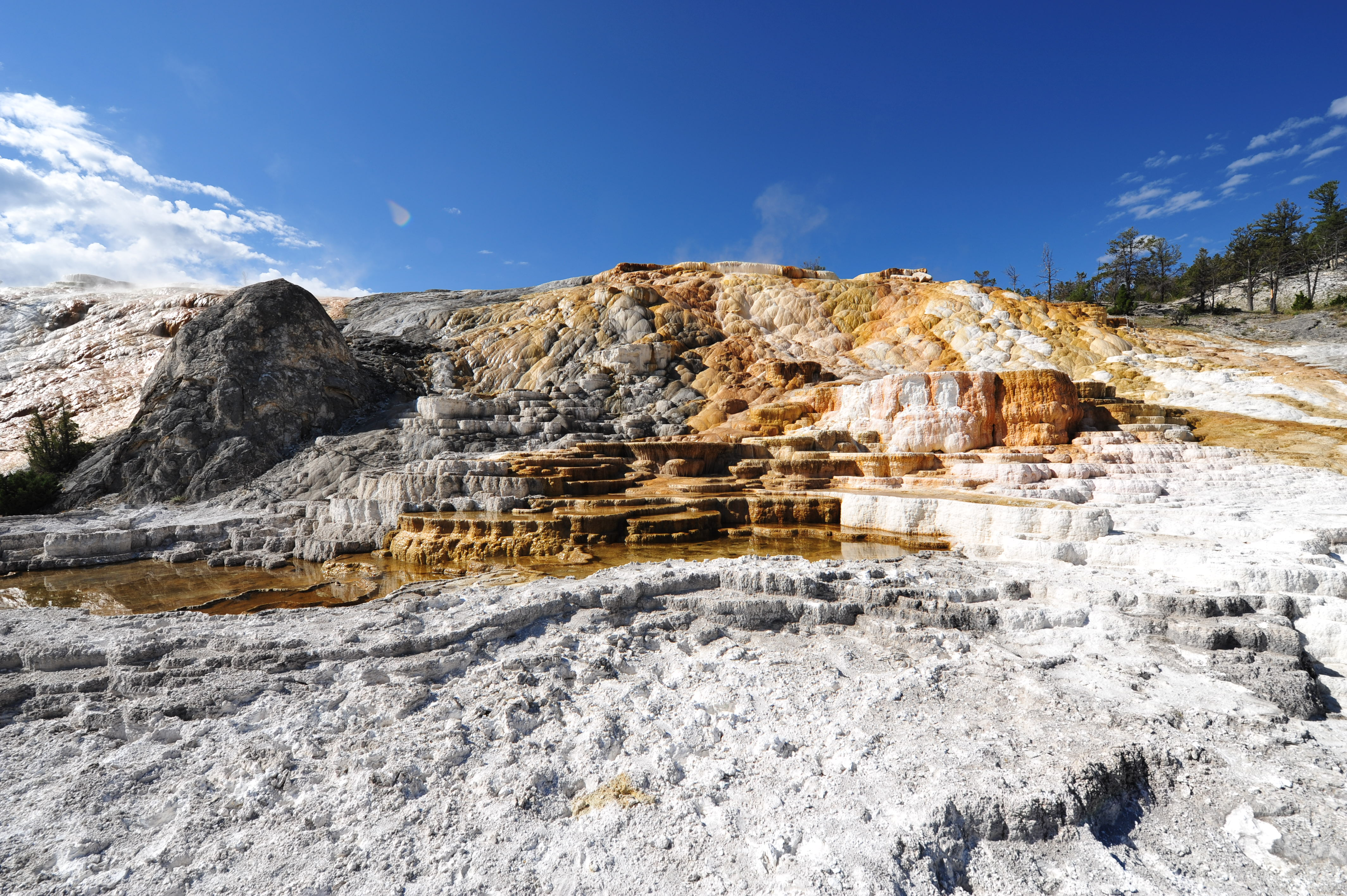
Mineral deposition

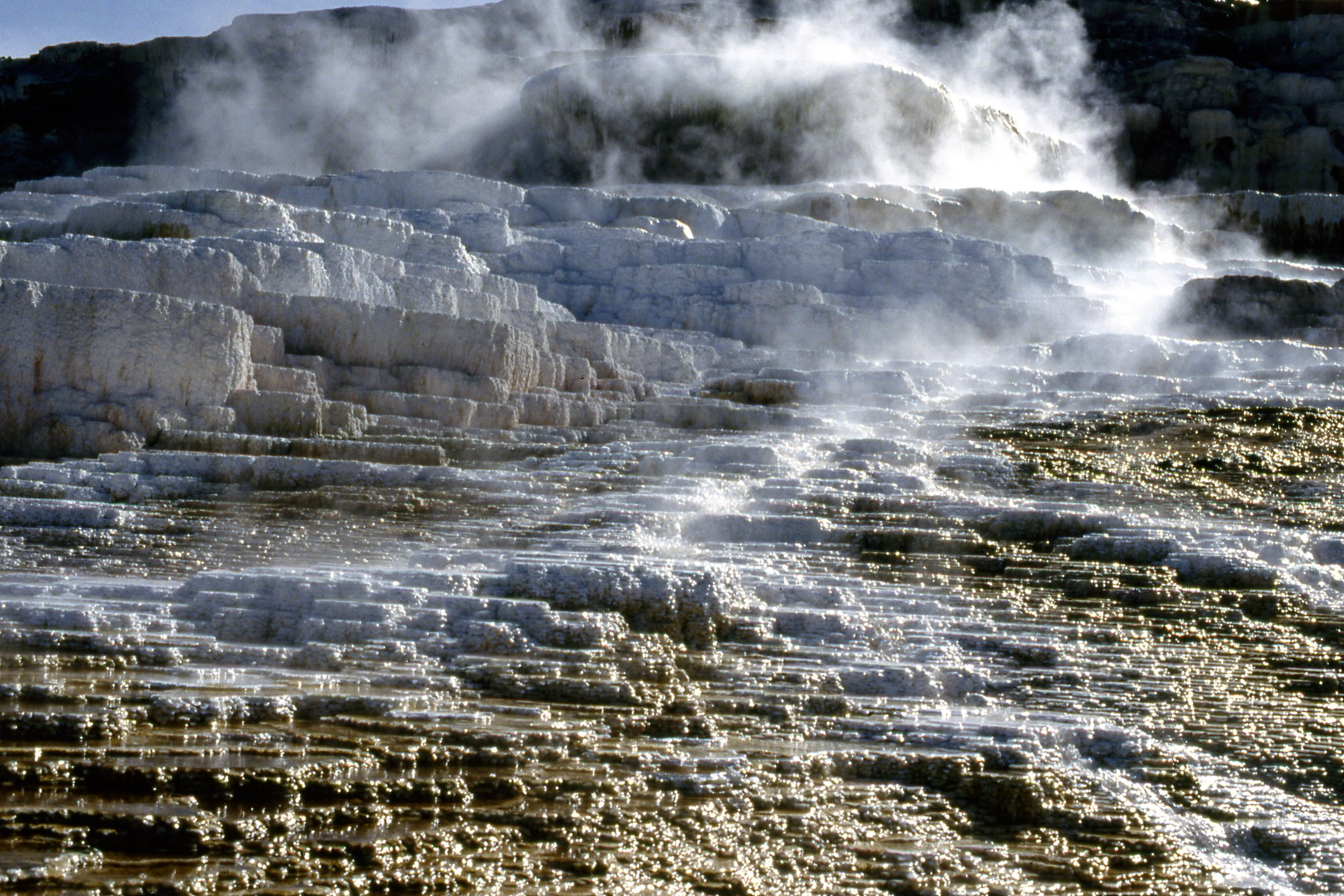
Travertine Terrace

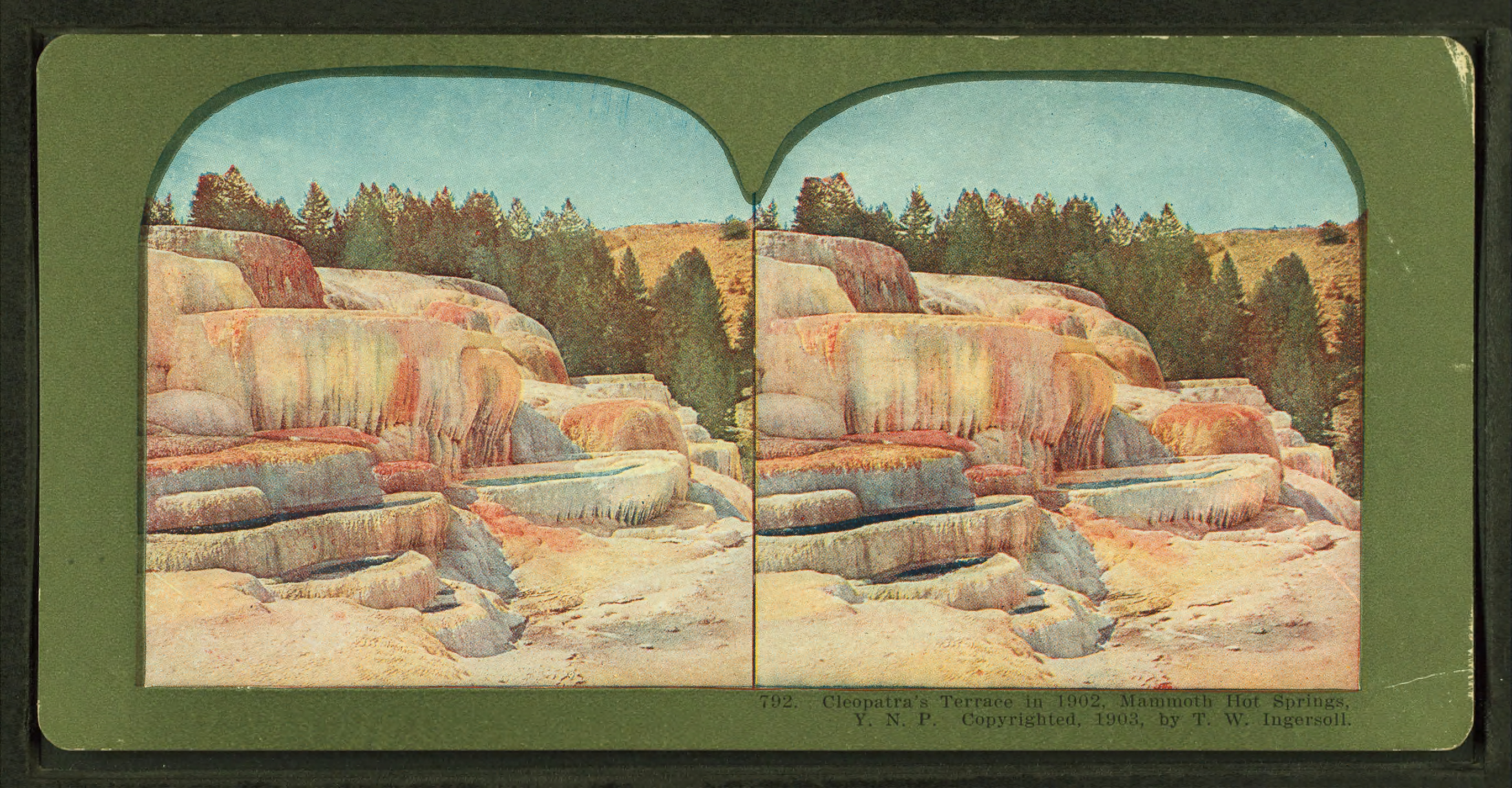
Cleopatra's Terrace Stereo card by T.W. Ingersoll

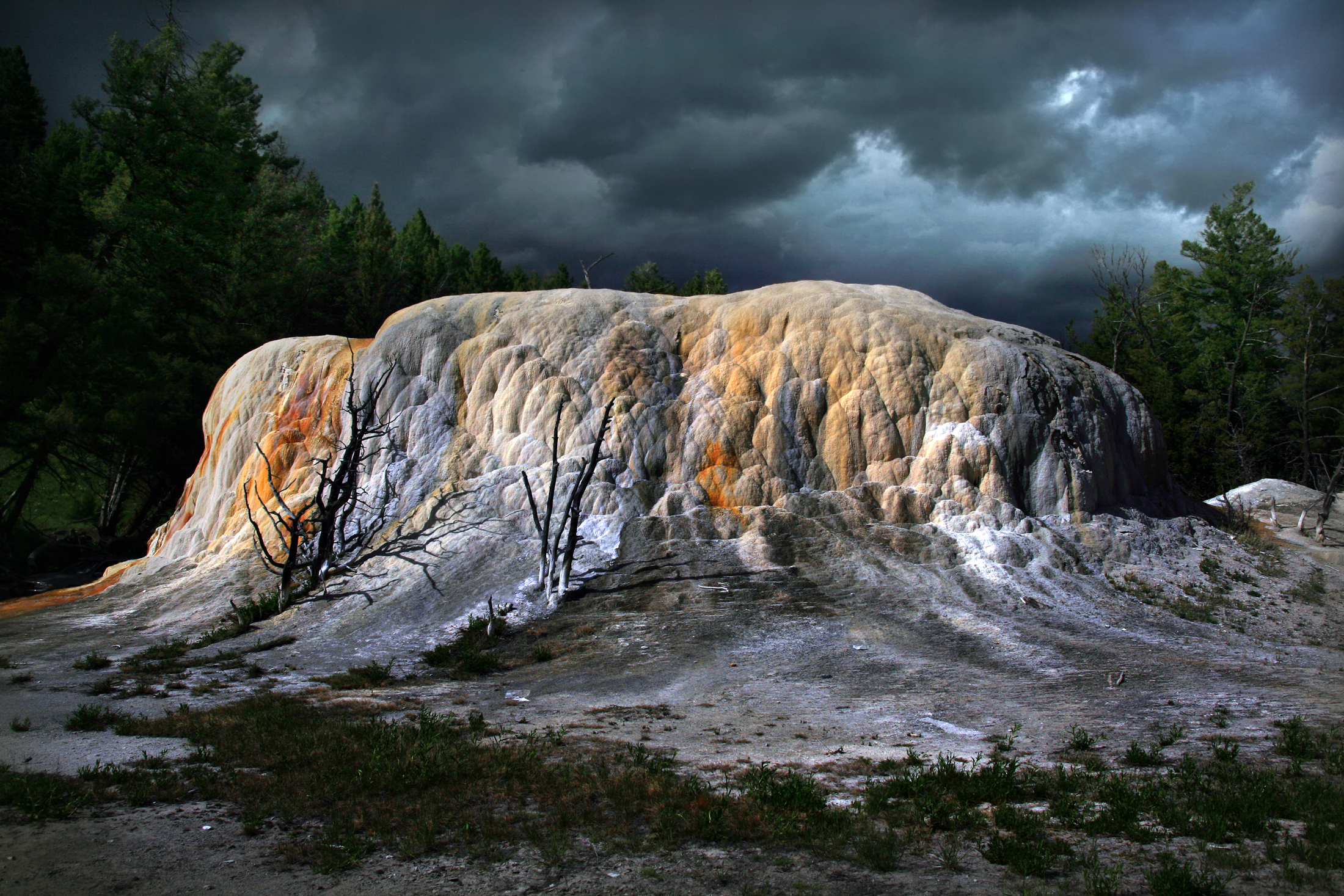
Orange Spring Mound at Mammoth Hot Springs

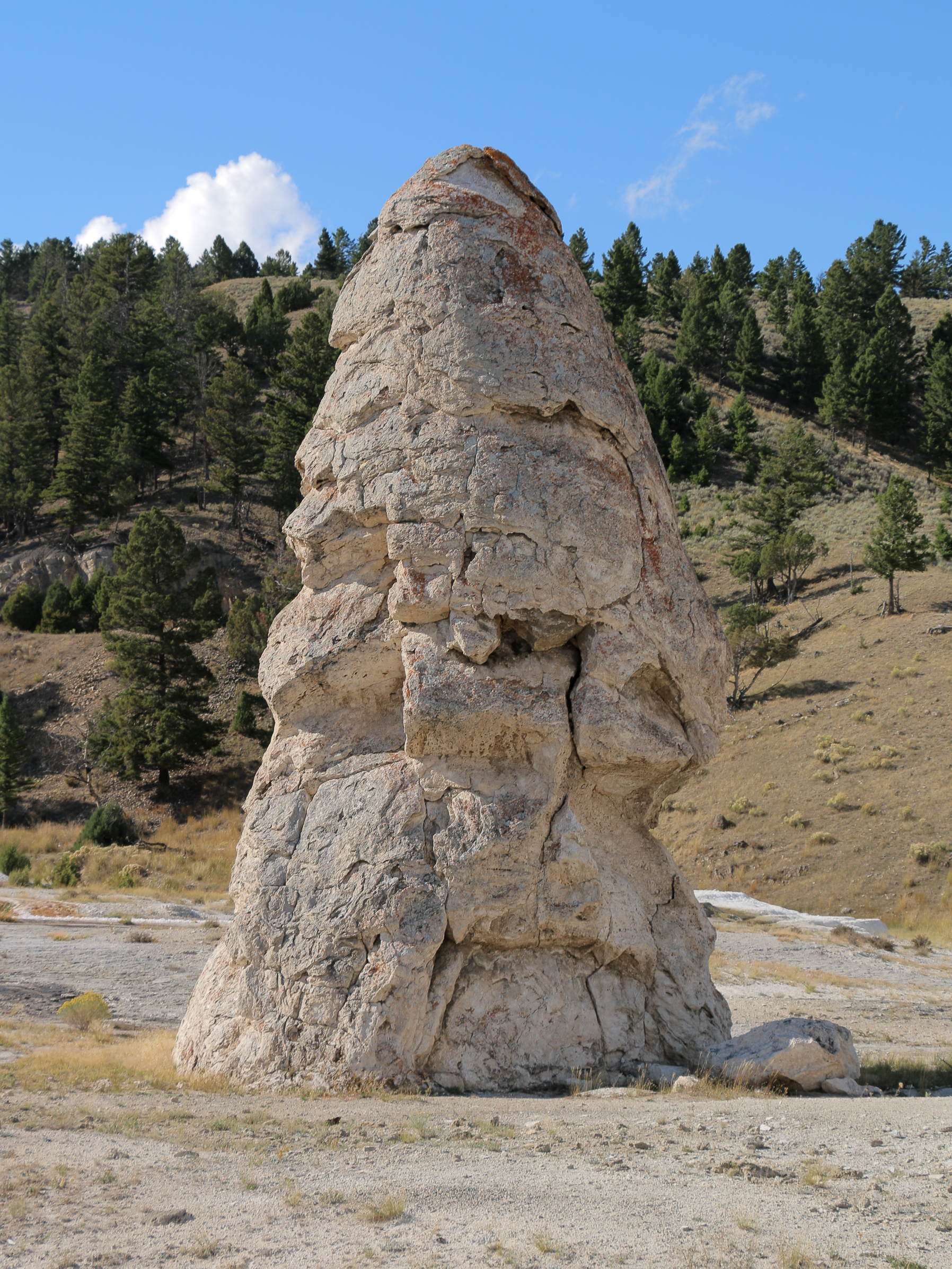
Liberty Cap

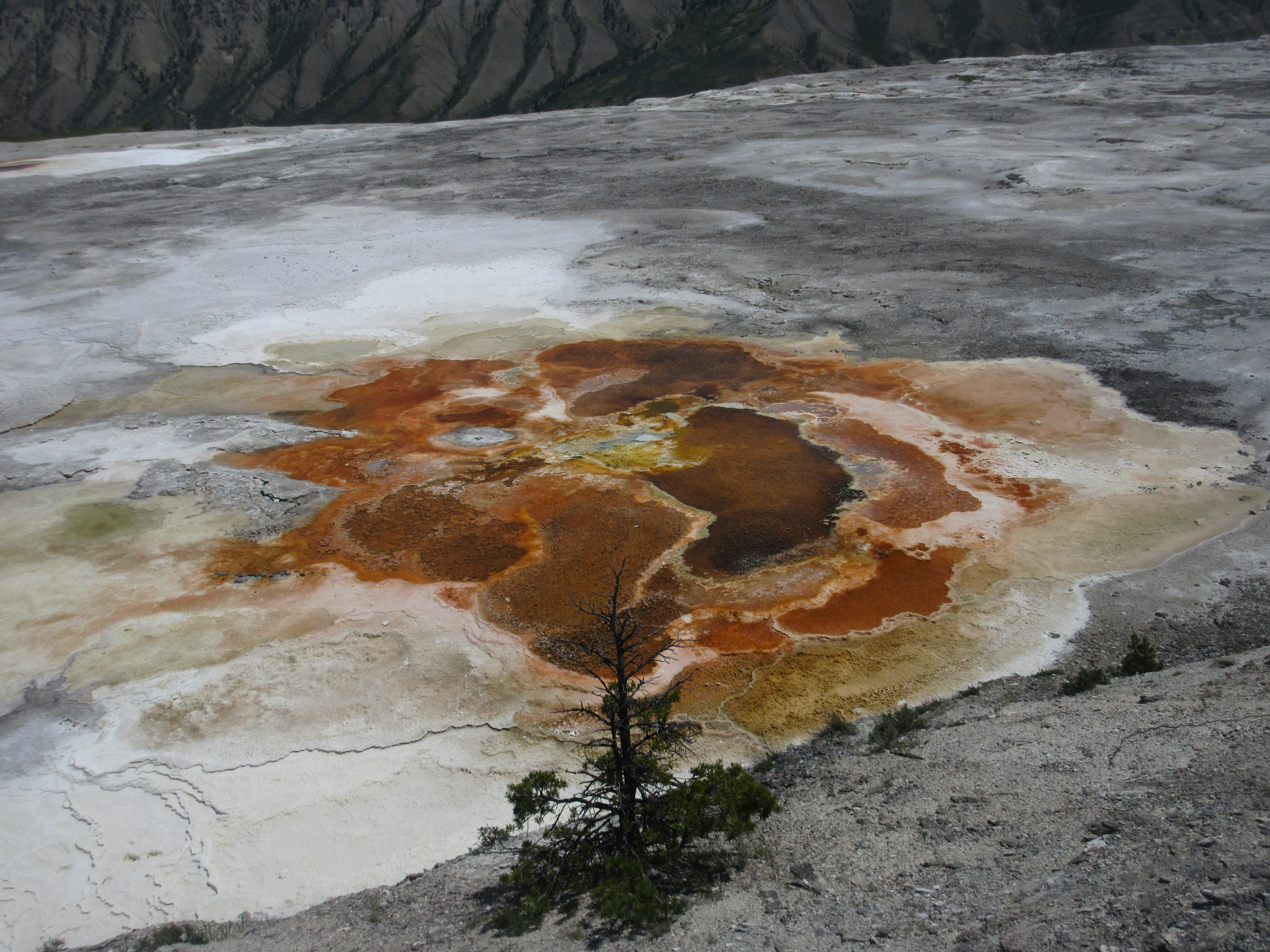
Dryad Spring

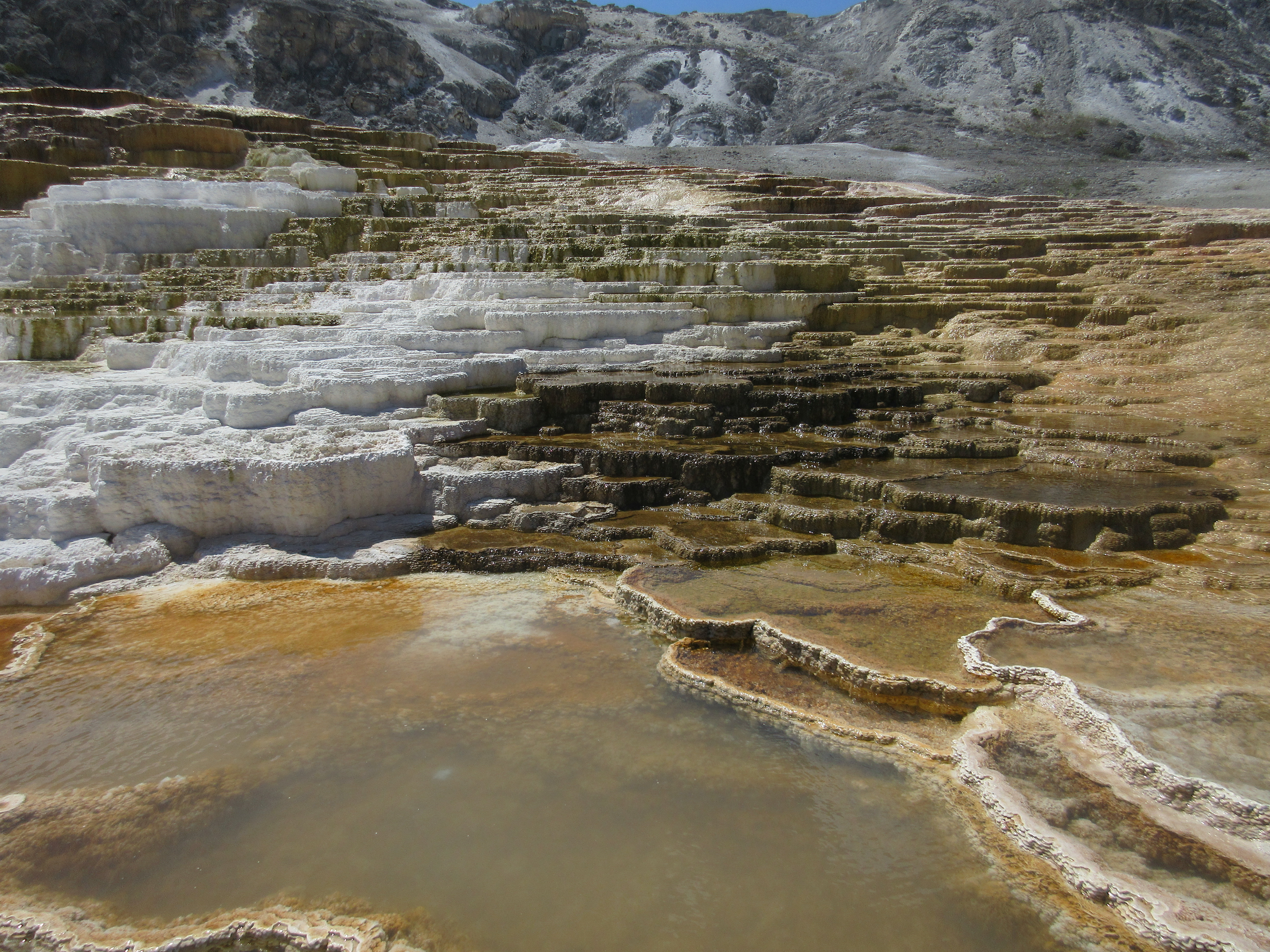
Mound Spring

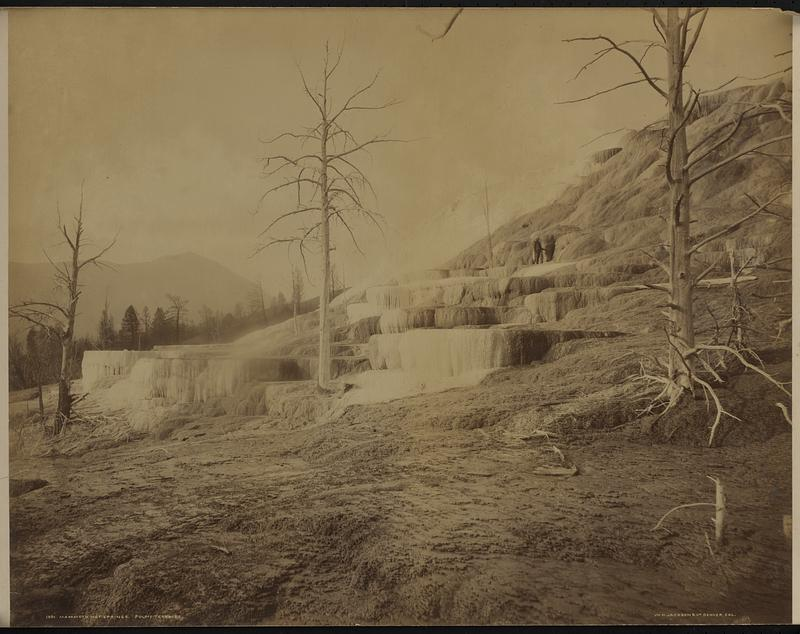
Pulpit Terraces, ca. 1879–1894.

== Individually named thermal features ==
- Angel Spring 1
- Angel Spring 2
- Angel Spring 3
- Aphrodite Terrace
- Baby Terrace
- Bath Lake
- Blue Springs
- Canary Spring
- Cavern Terrace
- Cedar Tree Spring
- Cheops Mound
- Cleopatra Terrace
- Cupid Spring
- Dedolph Spring-a
- Dedolph Spring-b
- Dedolph Spring-c
- Devil's Kitchen Springs (The Sodas)
- Devil's Thumb
- Fan Spring
- Fissure Ridge
- Glen Springs
- Highland Terrace
- Hymen Terrace
- Ladies' Lake
- Liberty Cap
- Little Burper
- Little Joker
- Little Lucifer
- Main Springs and Terrace
- Marble Terrace
- Minerva Terrace
- Mound Terrace
- Naid Spring
- Narrow Gauge Terrace
- New Blue Spring
- New Highland Terrace
- New Pallette Springs
- Opal Terrace (across the road from Liberty Cap)
- Orange Mound Spring
- Painted Pool
- Palette Spring
- Paperpicker Spring
- Poison Cave
- Poison Spring (Gaseous Hot Spring)
- Prospect Springs and Terrace
- Pulpit Terrace
- Rath Spring and Terrace
- Reservoir Springs
- River Styx-a
- River Styx-b
- Sidewalk Spring
- Soda Spring (Bargar-Allen & Day)
- Squirrel Springs and Squirrel Ridge
- Sulphur Pits
- Sulphur Spring
- Tangerine Spring
- The Buttress
- The Esplanade
- The Grottos
- Trail Springs
- White Elephant Back Terrace

== See also ==
- Geothermal areas of Yellowstone
