= Centennial Beach =

Public aquatic park in Naperville, Illinois

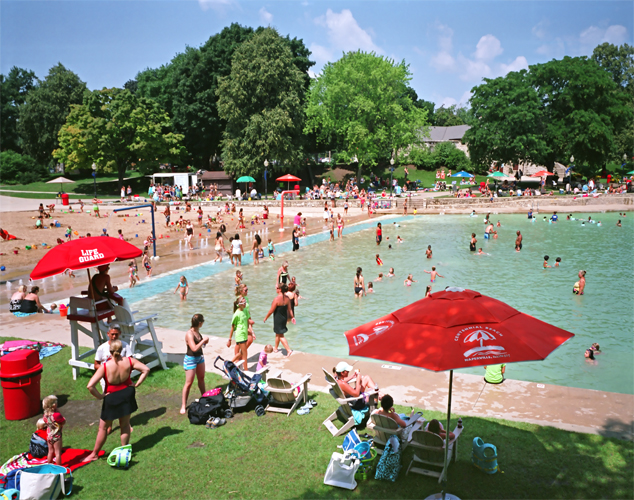
- Interactive map of Centennial Beach
- Type: Public aquatic park
- Location: 500 W. Jackson Avenue; Naperville, Illinois, United States
- Coordinates: 41°46′17″N 88°9′24″W
- Area: 6 acres (24,000 m^{2})
- Elevation: 217 m (712 ft)
- Operator: Naperville Park District
- Open: Memorial Day weekend through Labor Day weekend
- Website: www.centennialbeach.org

Centennial Beach is a public aquatic park located at 500 W. Jackson Avenue in Naperville, Illinois. The Beach is within an abandoned, double quarry alongside the DuPage River. The facility covers almost 6 acres (24,000 m^{2}) of land with a full two acres (8,000 m^{2}) or 6.2 million gallons of open water from Lake Michigan, all tested, re-circulated and chlorinated on site.

Among its features is a sand beach next to the shallow end of the pool which offers a zero-depth entry. At the zero depth area of the pool, there are 2 large water play features which pour water from about 10 feet (3.0 m) up, and water spouts that shoot up water for children to play in and cool off. The shallow end of the pool goes from 0 feet (0 m) to 4 feet (1.2 m), getting deeper as one walks further into the pool. In the 4 feet (1.2 m) area there are 3 lanes for lap swimmers, where Centennial Beach's swim team, The Mudrats, practice each weekday morning before open swim hours.

The shallow end also has a slide that was added in 2008. The shallow end also has an area called the “channel.” The deep end has an NCAA and USS-approved diving complex, which houses two one-meter springboards and one three-meter board.

Centennial Beach receives about 2,500 visitors on an average warm summer day. Over the course of a year the beach receives about 155,000. The beach plays host to various athletic events and is known for its nationally competitive lifeguard team.

== Skatepark ==
Centennial Beach has an adjacent skatepark to the west. The skatepark opens at 9:00 am, and closes at dusk. This facility includes skating elements, such as half-pipes, quarter pipes, fun boxes, rails and more. This skate park is unsupervised, and free of charge for non-motorized skateboards, in-line skates, and scooters. The use of a bicycle can only be used during bike hours at some sport complexes. Any other wheeled or sliding devices will be prohibited from the park. Skate at your own risk.

== Ball Field ==
Centennial Beach also has a baseball field that is used by the Naperville Little League. Naperville Little League is open to boys and girls 7 through 12 years of age. The league a child will play in corresponds with the distract the school they attend too. This complex was made possible by donations and other community groups and was completed in 2005. Recently, added in new bleachers, fencing around the fields, and a new entryway. Near two ball fields there is a park with various amenities.

== Deep-Water Test ==
Centennial Beach has a strict swimming requirement for the deep end which is blocked off by a pool safety rope. Swimmers who are in the 8th grade or younger must pass a deep water test, each year, to swim in the deep section. Those who pass the deep water test receive a wristband that allows use of the diving boards and deep end. A participant must swim 100 yards uninterrupted to be eligible.

== Adult Float ==
Every weekend there will be an adult float for participants to relax on inner tubes or swim around. The beach allows adults eighteen years and older on Saturday and Sunday from 9 am – 10:55 am to swim during adult swim. However, nobody under the age of eighteen may enter the beach until 11 am. This allows for adults to freely swim in the deep end with no distractions; such as, screaming children, loud noises, in this case it will allow adults to relax.

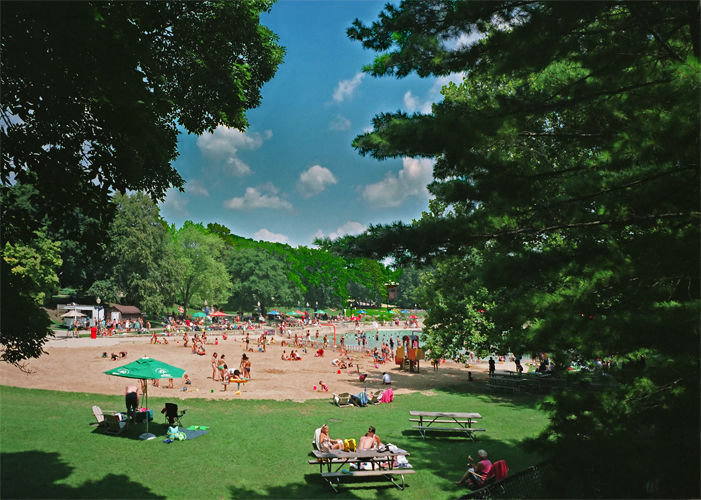
Centennial Beach viewed from the west

== The Grill ==
The Grill was added to Centennial Beach in 2011.

== Bathhouse ==
The bathhouse was constructed in 1934 using stones from the old Main Street bridge. The bathhouse includes a front office where patrons can pay for memberships or one-time visits to the beach, a manager's office, showers, lockers, washrooms, changing rooms, and a lower guard house. The old side office of the bathhouse, which was removed after 2011 renovations, used to be used as a concession stand. Anyone who lives in Naperville will receive a discount off their ticket, as for others who aren't in the area they will have to pay full price. Once anyone enters on either side of the entryway, there will be four family restrooms. The men's restroom as you enter will be on the far left, women's restroom will be slightly to the right. Once in the men or woman's restroom, you will notice two drinking fountains, stalls to change into, storage for belongings, washrooms, and showers. The bathhouse had an old side office within which was later removed after 2011 renovations, it was used as a concession stand. Below the bathhouse, down the stairs there will be the guard house, where lifeguards on/off duty will stay and relax before they go out on the beach to watch over families.

== Mudrats ==
Centennial Beach has a swim team for children up to age 18. The mascot for the Beach's swim team is the Mudrats. The swim team helps to enhance competitive strokes, conditioning, starts, turns, and more. The Mudrats have swim practice each weekday morning in the Centennial Beach lap lanes unless there is bad weather. The Mudrats have practice at Naperville Central High School on Fridays so that they can practice starts and turns since the beach is too shallow to dive into and has dark water so it is more difficult to do turns. Attendance for each swimmer is taken within 5 minutes of each practice. There are a total of 5 practices a week, every swimmer must attend 3 out of 5 in order to qualify to swim at all of the meets. Swim caps and goggles are mandatory for each practice. Swim meets cannot be placed without the dedication of parents. There are up to seventeen opportunities for parents to volunteer and help out the Mudrats swim team. All workers who decide on working a meet must arrive 45 minutes before the start time. A Mudrat could win or lose and the coaches and parents will always strive for them to do their best no matter what.

== History ==
Centennial Beach was purchased by the Permanent Memorial Committee in 1931. The committee was appointed by Judge Win Knoch, General Chairman of the Naperville Centennial Celebration, and consisted of 33 residents who each paid $500, a total of $16,500, to purchase the 45 acres (180,000 m^{2}) of 1 large and 1 small limestone quarry (later merged to create 1 swimming pool) as well as other land in Downtown Naperville near the DuPage River from the Von Oven estate. The actual development of the pool began in 1932 as a memorial for Naperville's 100th Anniversary. During the early years of the beach Naperville residents swam for free and non-residents had to pay 10 cents for children and 35 cents for adults to swim at the pool for the day. On Sundays and holidays the price went up to 50 cents per person. In the beach's first year it made $6,000.

According to a booklet produced by the Naperville Park District in 2006 to commemorate the 75th anniversary of the Beach, in the 1930s, income from the Beach was used to finance city projects.

The limestone bathhouses were completed in 1935. To commemorate the building of the bathhouse in 1935 the Beach held its first water show. More water shows took place at the Beach in the 1940s and 1950s, which served as a culmination of Red Cross summer swimming, water ballet, and diving classes.

Centennial Beach held its first Aquathon event in 1955. This Aquathon included community members doing water skiing demonstrations, high-dive exhibitions and synchronized swimming. Proceeds for this aquathon were donated to the then-new Edward Hospital.

In 1956 a similar event (to the aquathon) took place at the Beach. The fire department supplied an exciting fountain from the middle raft. The proceeds for this event went to the new fire station.

In 1969 the District assumed responsibility for Centennial Beach.

In 1970 the “Save the Beach Committee” was formed, composed 34 community members, to keep the pool from shutting down.

In 1976 the diving area was re-done, along with a new circulation and chlorination system the next year.

In 1981, when the Beach celebrated its 50th anniversary the Aquathon was resurrected with similar activities and shows to celebrate the Beach's earlier years. The aquathon was done again at Centennial Beach on July 8, 2006, for the Beach's 75th anniversary. The 2006 aquathon included activities like sandcastle and sand burying contests, greased watermelon and innertube races, bozo buckets and tug-of war, kayak demonstrations, scavenger hunts, pier tag tournaments, live music entertainment, cartoonist, face painters, balloon artists, a skate challenge, a water polo tournament, and a variety of unique and entertaining water-based performances for all ages. The aquathon of 2006 was all day, from 11 am – 8 pm.

During a significant flood on July 18, 1996, 17 inches of rain caused water levels to rise to the top of the high dive (three meters), contaminating the chlorinated water with river water and storm water. After 2 weeks and 3 days the 17 inches (430 mm) of waters receded, and the beach was emptied, cleaned and refilled.

From 2002 to 2004 more than 2 million dollars of renovations were put into the beach. Renovations included new concrete decks around the facility, a new circulation system, new lighting and sound systems, new staircases leading to the bathhouses and water play features.

On April 22, 2006, Centennial Beach held its first “Bottom-Feeder Ball.” The bottom-feeder ball was a birthday party for the Beach's 75th anniversary. The bottom-feeder ball was a dinner held at the bottom of the empty quarry. The funds from this event were used to purchase the beach's slide for the shallow end. The bottom-feeder ball began at 3:30 and had a variety of different types of entertainment that did not end until dark. The bottom-feeder ball had numerous posters for guests to look at, T-shirts to embellish, and the Waubonsie Valley High School Jazz Combo and the Naperville North High School Symphonic Orchestra performed. Guests received a 3-course dinner at the ball and the opportunity to see the bottom of the Beach while it was empty.
