= Naperville Township, Illinois =

Naperville Township
- Township
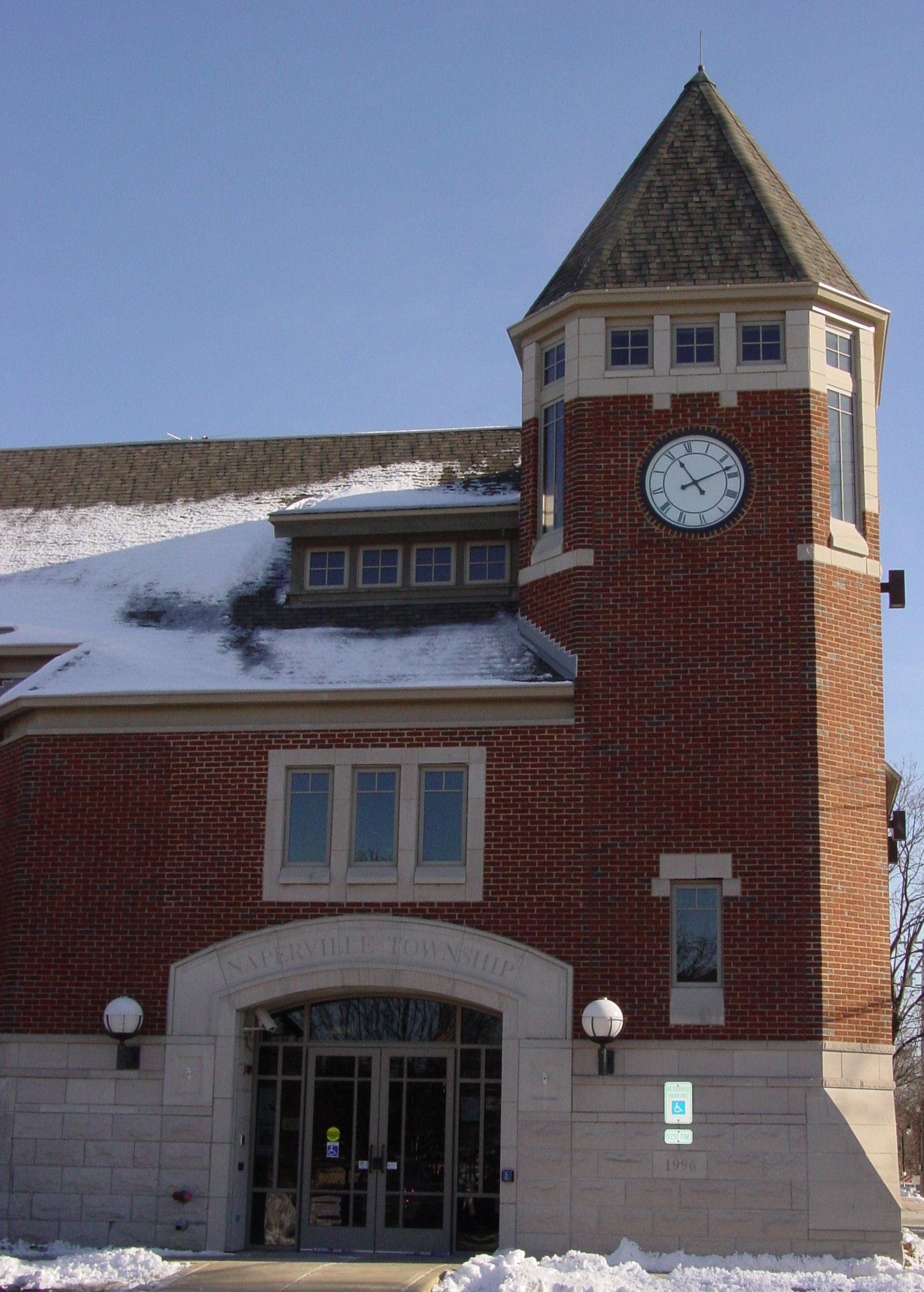
- Naperville Township office at the corner of Water and Webster Streets

- Location in DuPage County

- DuPage County's location in Illinois
- Coordinates: 41°46′18″N 88°12′21″W
- Country: United States
- State: Illinois
- County: DuPage
- Established: November 6, 1849

Government
  - Type: Illinois township
  - Supervisor: Eddie Bedford
  - Assessor: Matthew Rasche
  - Clerk: Nathaniel Sippel
  - Trustees: Loretta Burke; Julie Federico; Paul J. Santucci; John Waller

Area
  - Total: 35.83 sq mi (92.8 km^{2})
  - Land: 34.89 sq mi (90.4 km^{2})
  - Water: 0.94 sq mi (2.4 km^{2}) 2.61%
- Elevation: 709 ft (216 m)

Population (2020)
  - Total: 104,765
  - Density: 3,003/sq mi (1,159/km^{2})
- Time zone: UTC-6 (CST)
  - Summer (DST): UTC-5 (CDT)
- ZIP Codes: 60502, 60504, 60519, 60540, 60555, 60563, 60564, 60565
- Area codes: 630, 331
- FIPS code: 17-043-51635
- Website: napervilletownship.com

Naperville Township is one of nine townships in DuPage County, Illinois, United States. As of the 2020 census, its population was 104,765 and it contained 41,338 housing units.

== Geography ==
According to the 2021 census gazetteer files, Naperville Township has a total area of 35.83 square miles (92.80 km^{2}), of which 34.89 square miles (90.36 km^{2}) (97.39%) is land and 0.94 square miles (2.43 km^{2}) (2.61%) is water.

=== Cities, towns, villages ===
- Aurora (partial)
- Naperville (mostly)
- Warrenville (partial)

=== Unincorporated communities ===
- Batavia Junction at 41.7953068°N 88.2406259°W
- Eola at 41.7775292°N 88.2428476°W
- Fox Valley at 41.736676°N 88.258373°W
- Frontenac at 41.7447517°N 88.2328464°W

(This list is based on USGS data and may include former settlements.)

=== Extinct towns ===
- Copenhagen at 41.729140°N 88.198950°W

=== Cemeteries ===
The township contains three cemeteries: Copenhagen, Erb, and Naperville.

=== Major highways ===
- Interstate 88
- U.S. Route 34
- Illinois Route 59

=== Airports and landing strips ===
- Aero Estates Airport
- Edward Hospital Heliport
- Naper Aero Club Airport

== Natural features ==
- Cheshire Lake
- Dragon Lake
- Lake Osborne
- Lake Travis
- Lund Lake
- Meadow Lakes
- Meridian Lake
- Mud Lake
- Quarry Lake
- Spring Lake
- Walker Lake
- Waubonsie Lake
- Wildflower Lake
- Willow Lake
- DuPage County Big Woods Forest Preserve
- Springbrook Prairie Forest Preserve

== Landmarks ==
- Illinois Department of Corrections Youth Center
- Edward Hospital
- Naper Settlement (historic village, nearby Naperville)

== Demographics ==
As of the 2020 census there were 104,765 people, 38,178 households, and 26,107 families residing in the township. The population density was 2,924.03 inhabitants per square mile (1,128.97/km^{2}). There were 41,338 housing units at an average density of 1,153.76 per square mile (445.47/km^{2}). The racial makeup of the township was 54.59% White, 8.98% African American, 0.37% Native American, 23.12% Asian, 0.04% Pacific Islander, 4.63% from other races, and 8.27% from two or more races. Hispanic or Latino of any race were 11.55% of the population.

There were 38,178 households, of which 37.8% had children under 18, 55.0% were married couples living together, 9.3% had a female householder with no spouse present, and 31.6% were non-families. The average household size was 2.64 and the average family size was 3.22.

The median income for a household was $102,353, and for a family was $125,790. The per capita income for the township was $49,379. About 3.8% of families and 5.6% of the population were below the poverty line.

Historical population
Census	Pop.	Note	%±
1930	3,603		—
1940	3,616		0.4%
1950	4,861		34.4%
1960	8,218		69.1%
1970	13,028		58.5%
1980	21,053		61.6%
1990	49,533		135.3%
2000	85,763		73.1%
2010	100,019		16.6%
2020	104,765		4.7%
U.S. Decennial Census

== Government ==
Naperville Township’s elected officials serve four-year terms. The current township government includes:

- Supervisor – Eddie Bedford
- Assessor – Matthew Rasche
- Clerk – Nathaniel Sippel
- Trustees – Loretta Burke, Julie Federico, Paul J. Santucci, John Waller

=== Political districts ===
- Illinois's 13th congressional district
- State House Districts 48, 84, 95, and 96
- State Senate Districts 24, 42, and 48

== Education ==
- Community Unit School District 200
- Indian Prairie School District 204
- Naperville Community Unit School District 203
