= McDowell Grove Forest Preserve =

Forest preserve in Naperville, Illinois, US

- Location within Illinois
- Location: Naperville, Illinois
- Coordinates: 41°47′41″N 88°11′00″W
- Area: 439 acres (178 ha)
- Elevation: 689 ft (210 m)
- Established: 1946

McDowell Grove Forest Preserve, located in Naperville, state of Illinois, is a 439-acre (178 ha) preserve on the West Branch of the DuPage River.

The Forest Preserve District of DuPage County purchased the first tract of land for this preserve from Alexander McDowell in 1930. This original tract consisted of about 62 acres adjoining the West Branch of the DuPage River.

McDowell Grove was home to a Civilian Conservation Corps (CCC) camp from 1934 to 1943. During that time the camp housed two CCC companies: Co. 2612 from 1934 to 1937 and later Co V-1668, which had previously been located at Fullersburg Woods Forest Preserve. Workers from Camp McDowell completed numerous preserve improvements at McDowell, including dredging a lagoon, building several bridges, construction of a shelter and picnic area and building a limestone dam on the West Branch. At any one time, the camp housed about 200 men. The camp had military style barracks for housing of the 3,800 men who lived and worked in the camp during the five-year period.

Shortly after the Japanese attack on Pearl Harbor, the U.S. Army Signal Corps' Sixth Service Command took over the old Civilian Conservation Corps camp and used it as a facility for training students in the use and maintenance of radar technology. These trainees were civilian students who were part of the Engineering, Science, and Management War Training program. Under this program, civilian students received training at colleges in Chicago and received training on actual radar equipment at McDowell Grove.

Over the years, local lore has developed about the radar school being a top secret facility, although more recent research has revealed that the activities there may not have been so secret. However, after the closure of the radar school in 1943, the camp was occupied by the Office of Strategic Services as a temporary communications school. This presence does not seem to have been widely known and the OSS may have operated their school under the guise of the continuation of the earlier Radar School. At McDowell, OSS recruits received training in sending and receiving coded messages using field radios.

Following the war, the land reverted to the forest preserve district and most of the buildings were sold off. Additional parcels of land were eventually added to the preserve. Visitors to the preserve will find open space, hiking trails, picnic sites, fishing and other recreational opportunities. All of the CCC bridges have been removed over the years, but some of the bridge abutments remain. The dam was removed by the forest preserve district as part of a river restoration, and this removal eliminated the lagoon that was once north of the CCC picnic shelter. This lagoon is now a restored wetland habitat. Paddlers can access the West Branch of the DuPage River near the Fawell Dam at the south end of the preserve. They can reach the put-in and take-out sites via a gravel access road off Raymond Drive.

A new access bridge for McDowell Grove was constructed in 2018.
