= Naper Settlement =

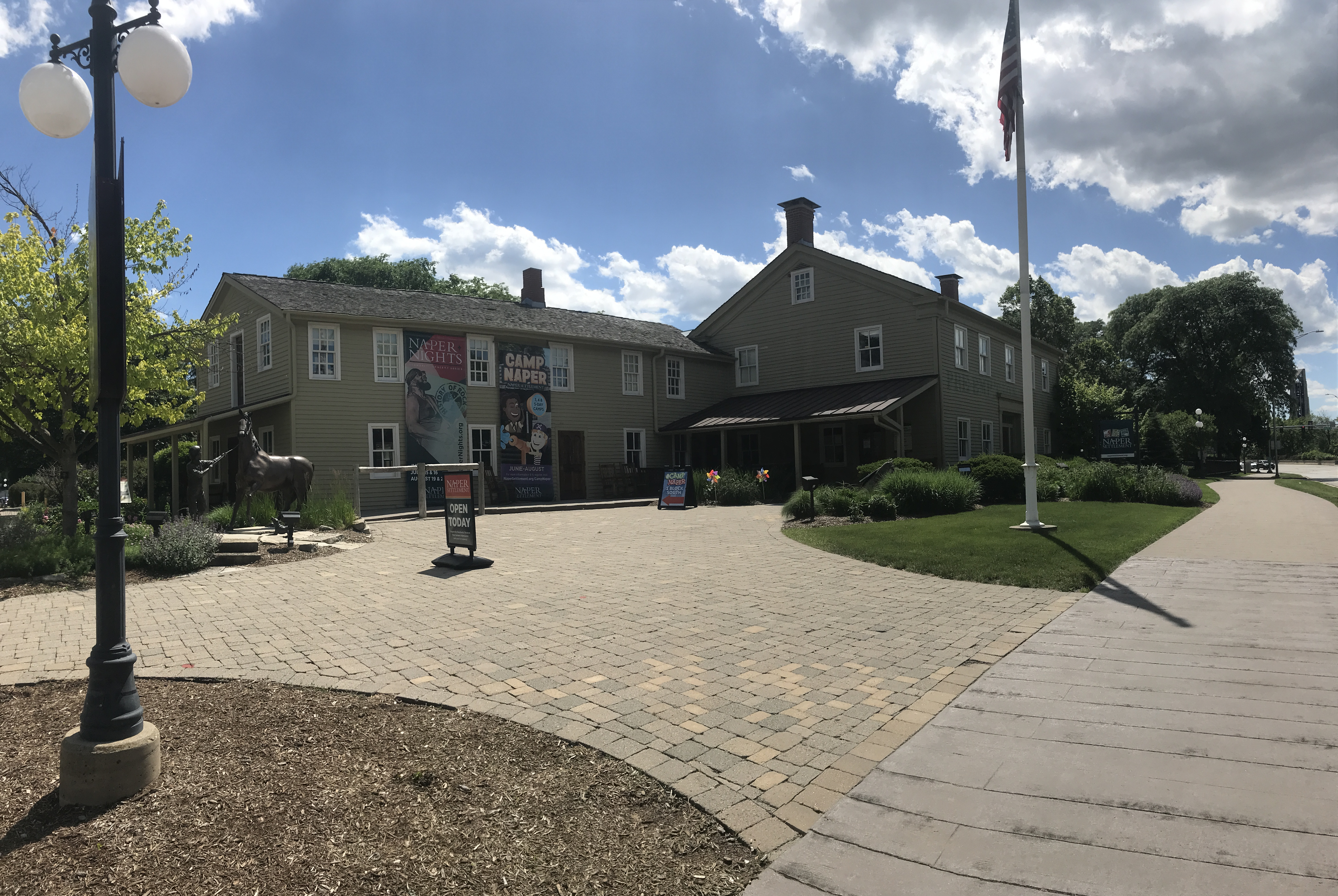
Front entrance of Naper Settlement

Naper Settlement, established in 1969, is a 13-acre (53,000 m^{2}) outdoor history museum accredited by the American Alliance of Museums that consists of a collection of thirty historical buildings and structures from the Naperville, Illinois area. Many buildings were moved here from their original locations and refurbished in a style fitting of their time periods that range from 1831, when Naperville was founded, through the early 20th century. Visitors can come for hands-on activities and tours led by museum educators in period costumes. The Settlement is situated on land bequeathed to the City of Naperville in 1936 by Caroline Martin Mitchell.

== Martin Mitchell Mansion ==
- Pine Craig
- U.S. National Register of Historic Places
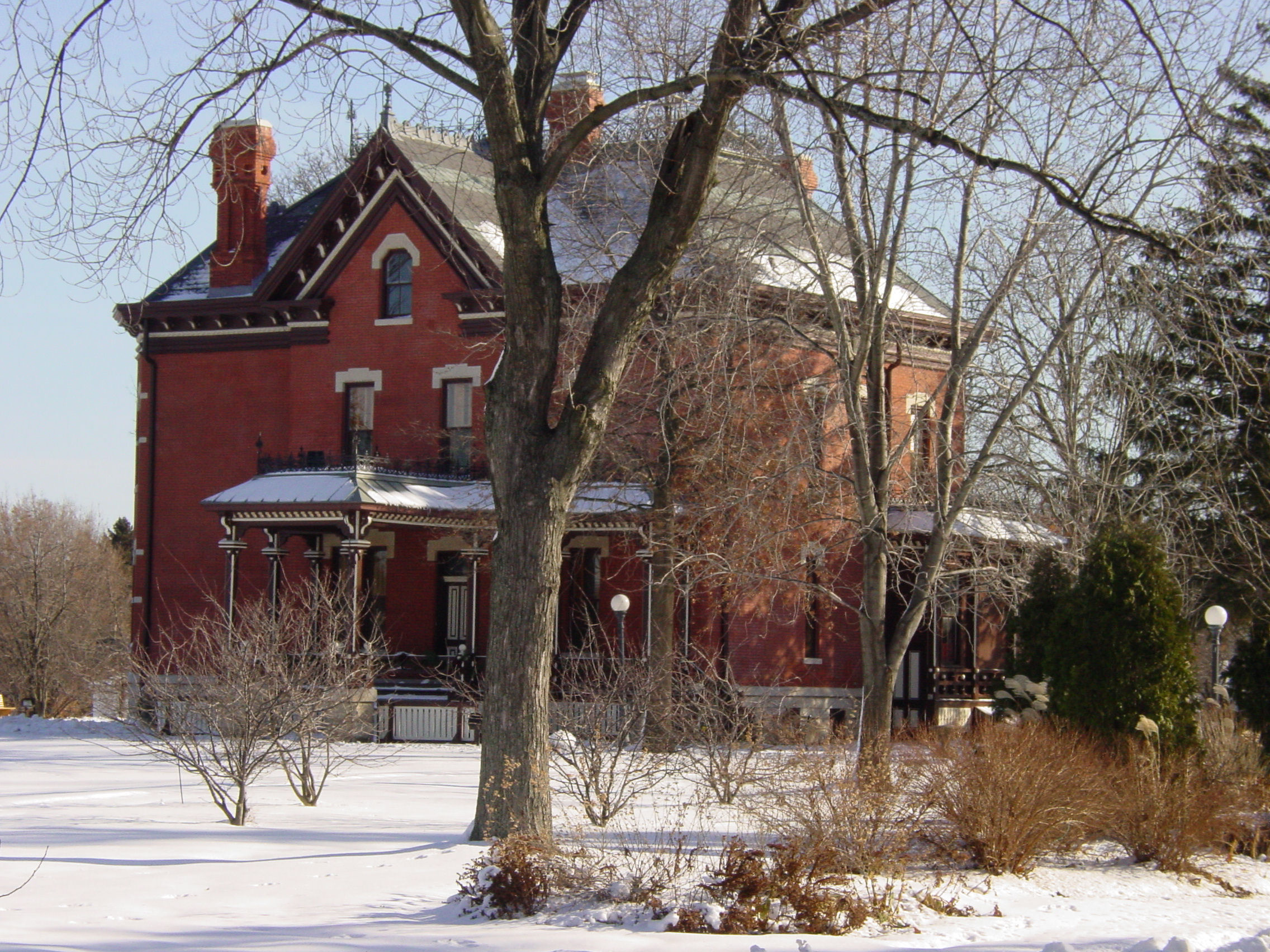
- The Martin-Mitchell Mansion within the Naper Settlement outdoor museum.

- Location within Illinois Location within the United States
- Location: 523 S. Webster St. Naperville, DuPage County, Illinois, U.S.
- Coordinates: 41°46′10″N 88°9′13″W
- Built: 1883
- Architect: J. Mulvey
- Architectural style: Italianate (Eastlake movement)
- NRHP reference No.: 75002076
- Added to NRHP: August 15, 1975

The Martin Mitchell Mansion, known to the original owners as Pine Craig, is a historic residence. The 12-room house was built with materials from Naperville businesses and stone from DuPage River quarries. George Martin II was the son of an immigrant from Scotland and made his fortune by taking advantage of local resources. He made agriculture his first venture, cultivating a farm and gradually expanding his land holdings to 1,000 acres. Martin then developed a limestone quarry along the DuPage, which became very successful in 1871 due to the high demand for stone after the Great Chicago Fire. He made his riches after he co-founded Naperville Tile and Brick Works, which eventually output over one million bricks and one million tiles. The tile was primarily used to drain swamps for farming. Martin operated his end of the business in his new home upon its 1883 construction. He named the house Pine Craig, and his family members lived in the house until 1936. The house was added to the National Register of Historic Places in 1975. The mansion is now part of Naper Settlement and underwent an extensive restoration from 2000 to 2003.

== Mary and Richard Benck Family Agriculture Center ==
The Center was opened in April 2023, dedicated to recognizing the role that farming has played in Naperville’s history. The center will be home to Naper Settlement's newest exhibit, Inventing Agriculture, scheduled to open in Fall 2026. The Center also hosts a Field Watchers program for school-aged children to get them interested in agriculture and other STEM careers.

== Programs and activities ==
Naper Settlement is an outdoor history museum that offers numerous other large special events. From 1982 until 2019, this included Civil War Days, a two-day reenactment, where the settlement was converted into a large encampment and more than 300 actors and actresses at a time re-enacted historical life and battles. Other special events had included Christkindlmarket and NaperLights. both of which were also cancelled in 2019.

== Public funding ==
In 2014, Naper Settlement was one of 47 Illinois museums to receive funding from the Illinois Public Museum Capital Grants Program as part of the state's larger construction initiative.
