= Eola, Illinois =

- Unincorporated community
- Location within Illinois
- Coordinates: 41°46′39″N 88°14′34″W
- Country: United States
- State: Illinois
- County: DuPage
- Township: Naperville
- Elevation: 722 ft (220 m)

Population (2010)
  - Total: 108
- Time zone: UTC-6 (Central (CST))
  - Summer (DST): UTC-5 (CDT)
- ZIP code: 60519
- Area codes: 630 & 331
- GNIS feature ID: 421790

Eola is an unincorporated community in Naperville Township, DuPage County, Illinois, United States. Although unincorporated, it has a post office, and has been given the zip code 60519. Eola is located near the western border of DuPage County, just north of Metra's BNSF Line, and is surrounded by the city limits of Aurora. The community is the site of a BNSF Railway yard. Metra's BNSF Line passes through the community but no longer stops there. A potential station would open on the STAR Line to transfer with the BNSF Line. In 2010, the population for Eola's zip code was 108. Eola is believed to be an acronym for End of Line Aurora.
