= Naperville, Illinois =

- City
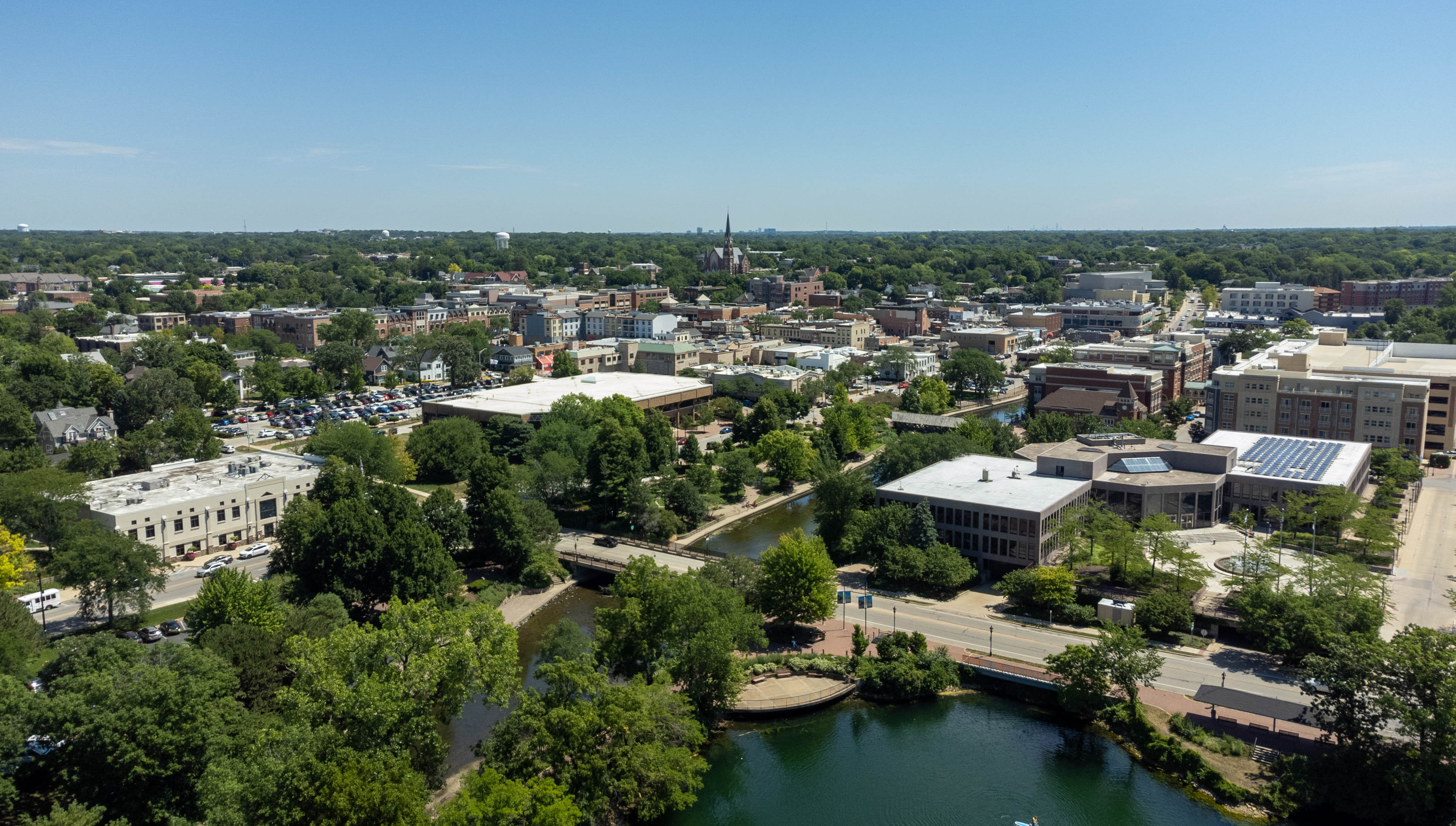
- Aerial view of downtown Naperville

- Flag Seal
- Motto: Great Service – All the Time
- Interactive map of Naperville, Illinois
- Location within Chicago metropolitan area Location within Illinois Location within the United States
- Coordinates: 41°45′50″N 88°08′52″W
- Country: United States
- State: Illinois
- Counties: DuPage, Will
- Townships: Dupage: Lisle, Milton, Naperville, Winfield; Will: DuPage, Wheatland
- Settled: 1831
- Incorporated: February 7, 1857 (Village); March 17, 1890 (City}
- Named for: Joseph Naper

Government
  - Type: Council–manager

Area
  - Total: 39.70 sq mi (102.81 km^{2})
  - Land: 39.11 sq mi (101.29 km^{2})
  - Water: 0.59 sq mi (1.52 km^{2})
- Elevation: 705 ft (215 m)

Population (2020)
  - Total: 149,540
  - Estimate (2024): 153,124 ▲
  - Density: 3,823.6/sq mi (1,476.29/km^{2})
- Demonym: Napervillian
- Time zone: UTC−6 (CST)
  - Summer (DST): UTC−5 (CDT)
- ZIP Codes: 60540, 60563–60565, and P.O. box only 60566–60567
- Area codes: 630 and 331
- FIPS code: 17-51622
- GNIS feature ID: 2395147
- Website: naperville.il.us

Naperville (/ˈneɪ.pər.vɪl/, NAY-pər-vil) is a city in DuPage and Will counties in the U.S. state of Illinois. It is a city in the Chicago metropolitan area located 28 miles (45 km) west of the city on the DuPage River. As of the 2020 census, its population was 149,540, making it the state's fourth-most populous city.

Naperville was founded in 1831 by Joseph Naper. The city was established by the banks of the DuPage River and was originally known as Naper's Settlement. By 1832, over 100 residents lived in Naper's Settlement. In 1839, after DuPage County was split from Cook County, Naperville became the county seat, which it remained until 1868. Beginning in the 1960s, Naperville experienced a significant population increase as a result of Chicago's urban sprawl.

Naperville is home to Moser Tower and Millennium Carillon, one of the world's four largest carillons. It is also home to an extensive parks and forest preserve network, including Centennial Beach. The city has two school districts, 203 and 204. Naperville's largest employer is Edward Hospital with 4,500 employees. Naperville has a train station served by Amtrak and Metra.

== History ==
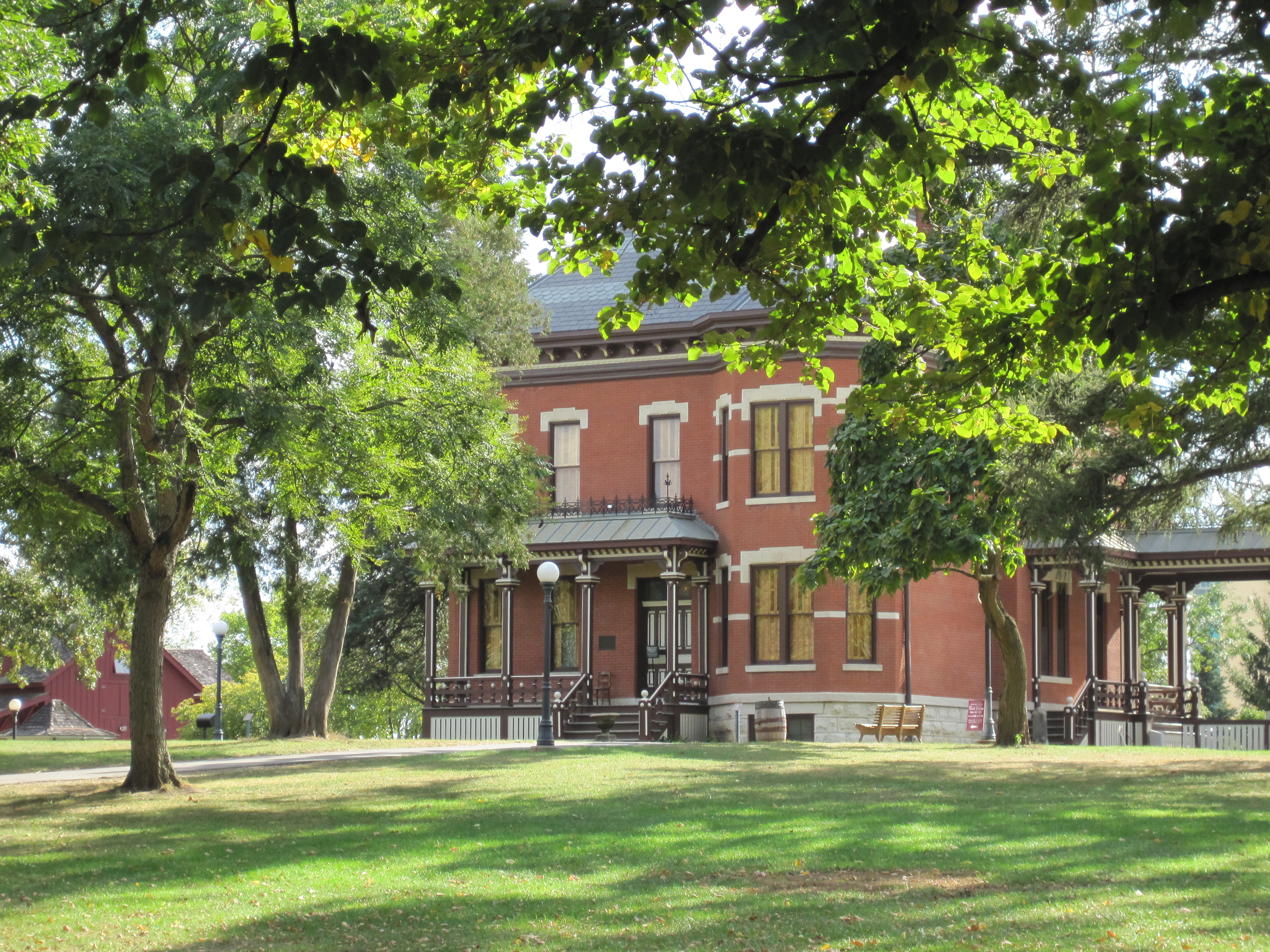
The Martin-Mitchell Mansion, within the Naper Settlement outdoor museum, is listed on the National Register of Historic Places.

Before any settlement, Naperville was home to Native American tribes. In 1641, the first European contact with Native Americans in Illinois was made with members of the Iliniwek tribe. The Iliniwek was the predominant tribe throughout Illinois at the time. They were later forced off the land by the Potawatomi tribe. The Potawatomi inhabited Naperville when the first settlers arrived. There was a major Potawatomi village at the present site of downtown Naperville, reached from Chicago by a trail that became Ogden Avenue. A minor village was near where Bailey Hobson later built his mill in 1834. Bailey Hobson is credited as the first white settler in Naperville; he built a cabin across the DuPage River's West Branch from the mill in 1830, and built his home there in 1835.

In 1831, Joseph Naper arrived at the west bank of the DuPage River with his family and friends to found what would be known as Naper's Settlement. Among those original settlers were Naper's wife, his brother and his wife, his sister and her husband John Murray, and his mother. Their arrival followed a nearly two-month voyage from Ashtabula County, Ohio, in the Naper brothers' schooner, the Telegraph. By 1832, over 100 settlers had arrived at Naper's Settlement. After the news of the Indian Creek massacre during the Black Hawk War, these settlers were temporarily displaced to Fort Dearborn for protection from an anticipated attack by the Sauk tribe. Fort Payne was built at Naper's Settlement, the settlers returned and the attack never materialized. The Pre-Emption House was constructed in 1834, as the Settlement became a stagecoach stop on the road from Chicago to Galena. The Pre-Emption House was the first hotel in DuPage county. After DuPage County was split from Cook County in 1839, Naper's Settlement became the DuPage county seat. In 1843, the Illinois General assembly passed an act to incorporate the Naperville Cemetery Association. In 1855, Sybil Dunbar came to Naperville as its first recorded black female resident; she died in 1868 and was buried in Naperville Cemetery.

Naper's Settlement was incorporated as the Village of Naperville in 1857, with a population of 2,000. The county seat distinction was lost in 1868 to Wheaton. On August 5, 1873, a train crashed on the CB&Q tracks about 1.5 miles (2.4 km) east of Naperville. Conductor Williams, who was operating a passenger train, was informed of a freight train occupying the line, but for some reason increased his speed, and upon rounding a curve, ran into a freight caboose. A conductor sitting in the caboose and a cattle drover were instantly killed. The passenger train fireman and engineer jumped out of the locomotive just in time to save their lives.

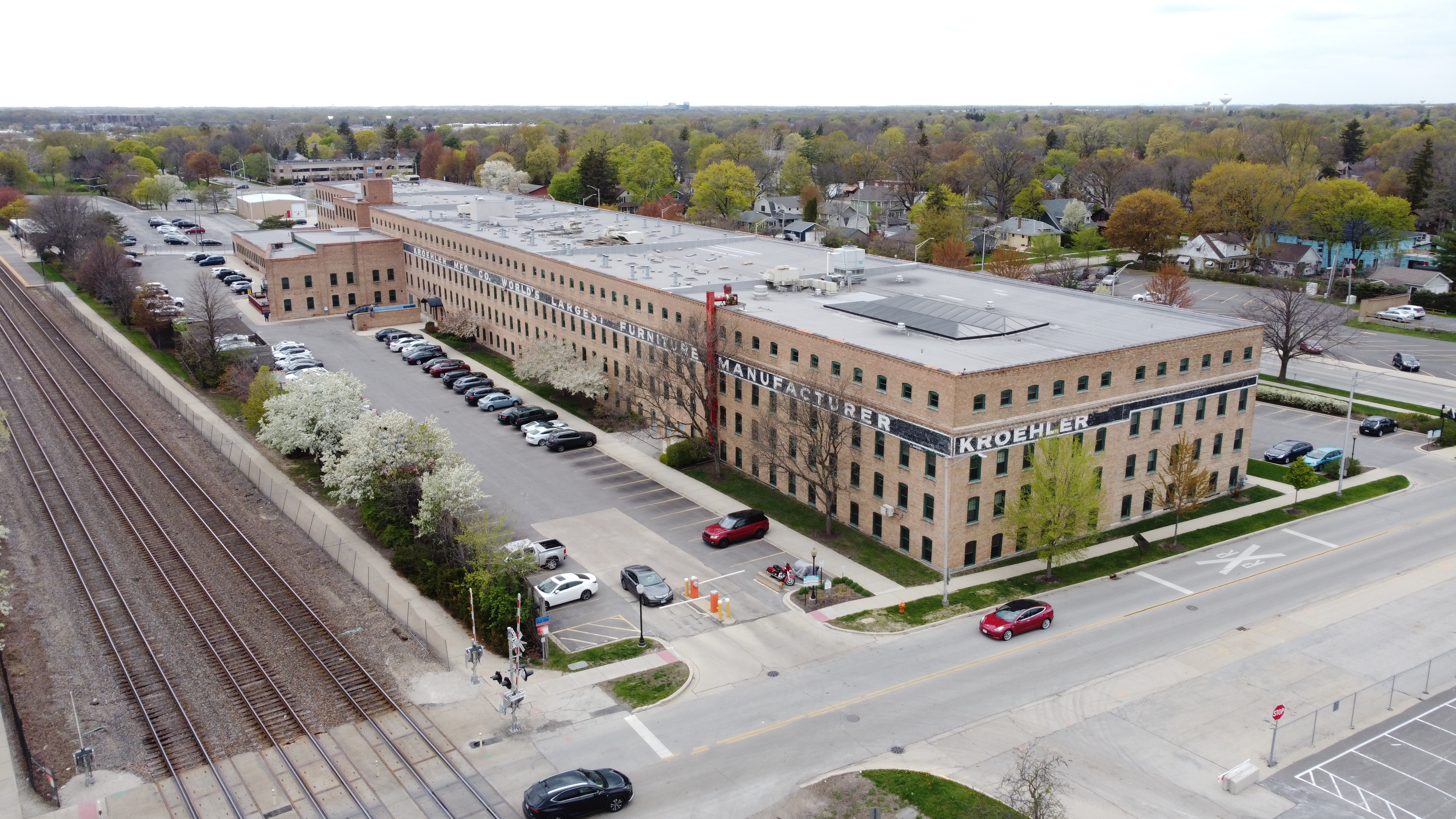
The former Kroehler Furniture Factory, in 2021

In 1887, Peter Edward Kroehler established the Kroehler Manufacturing Company's factory in Naperville along the Chicago, Burlington & Quincy tracks. In 1890, reincorporation as a city occurred. After Professor James Nichols donated $10,000, Nichols Library was built and dedicated in 1898. In January 1907, Edward Sanatorium (now Edward Hospital) was opened by Eudora Hull Spalding. It used the open air treatment for tuberculosis patients. In 1908, the Chicago YMCA stated that Naperville was too small for its own YMCA building, but Peter Kroehler led a campaign to build one. In January 1910, Kroehler was the mayor of Naperville and its richest resident, but rumors in Naperville relating to a relationship between him and his stenographer caused him to resign as mayor. After his resignation, he retreated to his Binghamton, New York factory. The YMCA was opened on March 26, 1911, and included the first swimming pool in DuPage County. In February 1920, Edward Sanatorium burned to the ground and cost $500,000 to rebuild.

On April 25, 1946, Naperville was the site of a train disaster. Two Chicago, Burlington and Quincy Railroad trains collided "head to tail" on a single track just west of the Loomis Street grade crossing. The accident killed 45 and injured approximately 127 passengers and/or crew members. In the 1950s, the city limits were about six square miles, but by 1960, the city had its single largest year in geographical expansion in Naperville's history with over 1,500 acres annexed. In 1955, Edward Sanatorium was converted into a general hospital.

A predominantly rural community for most of its existence, Naperville experienced a population explosion beginning in the 1960s and continuing into the 1980s and 1990s. Throughout the 1980s and '90s, the city's population tripled. In 1996, Naperville was the site of a flood that also affected the majority of northeastern Illinois. Naperville received 14 inches of rain in less than 24 hours, and DuPage County was declared a disaster zone. The estimated damages were over $30 million. The YMCA in Downtown Naperville was announced to close in May 2020 after 109 years of operation, due to economic difficulties caused by the COVID-19 pandemic.

== Geography ==
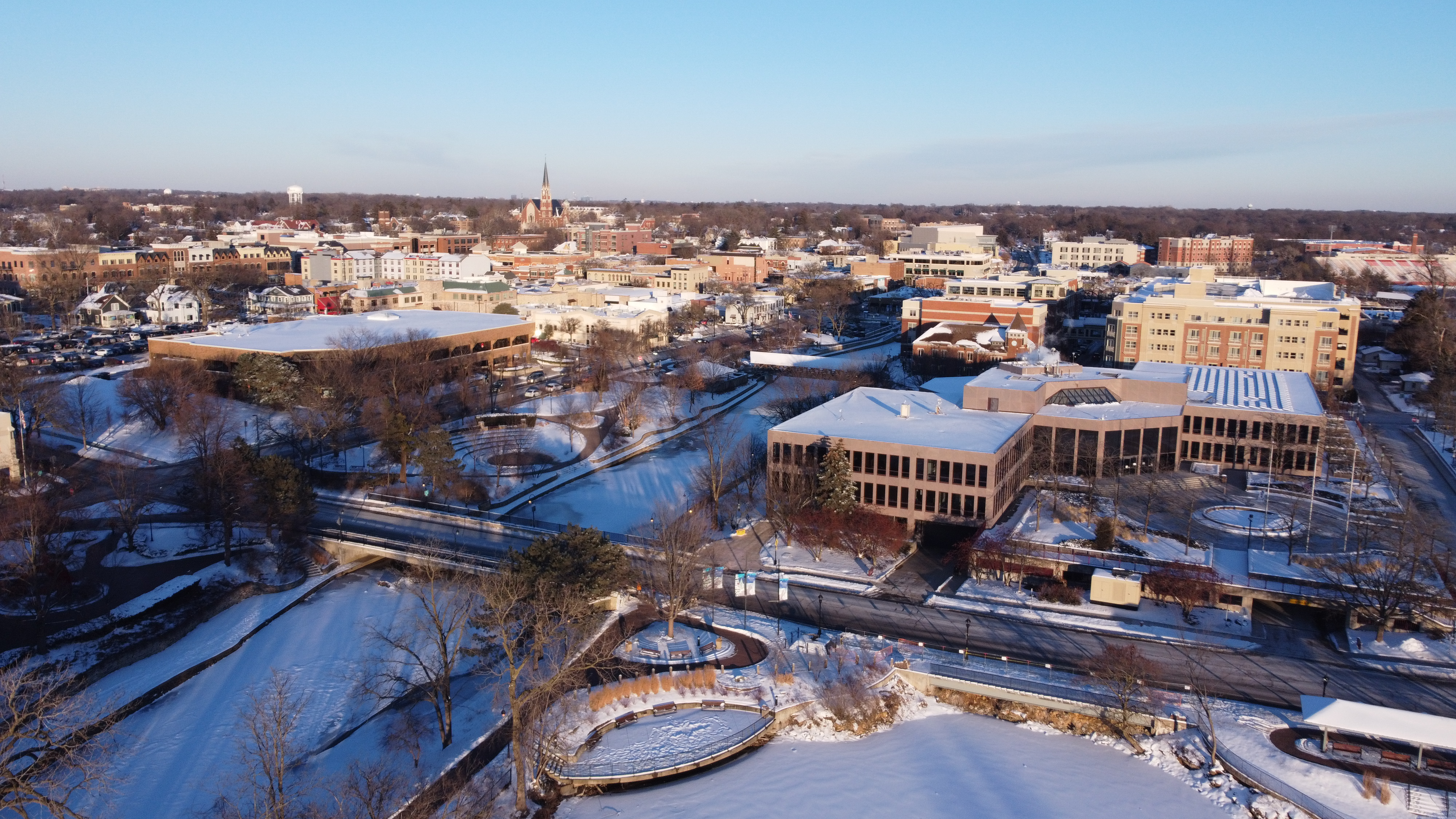
Downtown Naperville in January 2022, with measurable snowfall on the ground

Naperville is a suburb of the city of Chicago, located in the northeastern region of Illinois. It exists in six townships and two counties. In DuPage County, the northwest portion is in Winfield Township, the northeast portion in Milton Township, the west-central portion in Naperville Township, and the east-central portion in Lisle Township. In Will County, the southwest portion is in Wheatland Township, and the southeast portion in DuPage Township. The largest number of Naperville residents live in Lisle Township, followed by Naperville Township.

According to the 2021 census gazetteer files, Naperville has a total area of 39.68 square miles (102.77 km^{2}), of which 39.10 square miles (101.27 km^{2}) (or 98.52%) is land and 0.59 square miles (1.53 km^{2}) (or 1.48%) is water. Parts of Naperville drain to the West Branch of the DuPage River in DuPage County. The Forest Preserve District owns a large amount of property along the West Branch, minimizing development in floodplains and helping reduce damage from overbank flooding that has occurred in more developed watersheds. The DuPage River Trail runs along this river and accommodates both bicycles and pedestrians. Naperville was primarily flat prairie before settlement. Its main geographic anomalies are manmade hills, such as Greene Valley Hill, a former garbage dump. Naperville has experienced two major floods, one in 1996 and another in 2013.

Naperville's municipal boundaries are notably interrupted by multiple enclaves. In the west, Springbrook Prairie, a forest preserve managed by the Forest Preserve District of DuPage County, forms a major enclave. In the southwest, the Tamarack neighborhood is a significant unincorporated enclave. In the north, McDowell Grove Forest Preserve and a cluster of office complexes near Diehl Road also create a pronounced enclave within the city boundary.

=== Climate ===
Naperville has a typical Midwestern humid continental climate (Köppen Dfa). There are four distinct seasons: winters are cold and snowy, springs are humid, summers are hot, and falls are cool. The highest recorded temperature was 105 °F, and the coldest was -29 °F. Like all Chicago suburbs, Naperville lies within USDA plant hardiness zone 5b.

Climate data for Naperville, Illinois
Month	Jan	Feb	Mar	Apr	May	Jun	Jul	Aug	Sep	Oct	Nov	Dec	Year
Mean daily maximum °F (°C)	30 (−1)	35 (2)	47 (8)	60 (16)	71 (22)	80 (27)	83 (28)	81 (27)	75 (24)	63 (17)	48 (9)	34 (1)	59 (15)
Mean daily minimum °F (°C)	15 (−9)	18 (−8)	27 (−3)	37 (3)	46 (8)	56 (13)	61 (16)	60 (16)	51 (11)	40 (4)	30 (−1)	19 (−7)	38 (4)
Average precipitation inches (mm)	1.69 (43)	1.73 (44)	2.36 (60)	3.62 (92)	4.02 (102)	4.21 (107)	3.90 (99)	4.06 (103)	3.58 (91)	3.07 (78)	3.23 (82)	2.20 (56)	37.67 (957)
Source: The Weather Channel

== Demographics ==
Historical population
Census	Pop.	Note	%±
1870	1,713		—
1880	2,073		21.0%
1890	2,216		6.9%
1900	2,629		18.6%
1910	3,449		31.2%
1920	3,830		11.0%
1930	5,118		33.6%
1940	5,272		3.0%
1950	7,013		33.0%
1960	12,933		84.4%
1970	22,794		76.2%
1980	42,330		85.7%
1990	85,351		101.6%
2000	128,358		50.4%
2010	141,853		10.5%
2020	149,540		5.4%
U.S. Decennial Census; 2010 2020

As of the 2020 census there were 149,540 people, 52,648 households, and 39,443 families residing in the city. The population density was 3,768.36 inhabitants per square mile (1,454.97/km^{2}). There were 55,348 housing units at an average density of 1,394.75 per square mile (538.52/km^{2}). The racial makeup of the city was 63.39% White, 4.99% African American, 0.17% Native American, 22.29% Asian, 0.03% Pacific Islander, 2.23% from other races, and 6.89% from two or more races. Hispanic or Latino of any race were 6.94% of the population.

There were 52,648 households, out of which 38.3% had children under the age of 18 living with them, 64.65% were married couples living together, 7.40% had a female householder with no husband present, and 25.08% were non-families. 20.35% of all households were made up of individuals, and 7.33% had someone living alone who was 65 years of age or older. The average household size was 3.24 and the average family size was 2.76.

The city's age distribution consisted of 25.3% under the age of 18, 7.9% from 18 to 24, 25% from 25 to 44, 28.6% from 45 to 64, and 13.0% who were 65 years of age or older. The median age was 39.1 years. For every 100 females, there were 96.8 males. For every 100 females age 18 and over, there were 93.7 males.

The median income for a household in the city was $127,648, and the median income for a family was $150,075. Males had a median income of $94,340 versus $47,690 for females. The per capita income for the city was $58,075. About 2.6% of families and 3.8% of the population were below the poverty line, including 4.3% of those under age 18 and 3.2% of those age 65 or over.

Naperville City, Illinois – Racial and ethnic composition Note: the US Census treats Hispanic/Latino as an ethnic category. This table excludes Latinos from the racial categories and assigns them to a separate category. Hispanics/Latinos may be of any race.
Race / Ethnicity (NH = Non-Hispanic)	Pop 2000	Pop 2010	Pop 2020	% 2000	% 2010	% 2020
White alone (NH)	106,386	103,603	92,603	82.88%	73.04%	61.93%
Black or African American alone (NH)	3,828	6,504	7,326	2.98%	4.59%	4.90%
Native American or Alaska Native alone (NH)	134	122	104	0.10%	0.09%	0.07%
Asian alone (NH)	12,351	21,094	33,269	9.62%	14.87%	22.25%
Native Hawaiian or Pacific Islander alone (NH)	23	32	44	0.02%	0.02%	0.03%
Other race alone (NH)	130	224	612	0.10%	0.16%	0.41%
Mixed race or Multiracial (NH)	1,346	2,700	5,208	1.05%	1.90%	3.48%
Hispanic or Latino (any race)	4,160	7,574	10,374	3.24%	5.34%	6.94%
Total	128,358	141,853	149,540	100.00%	100.00%	100.00%

As of April 2020, Naperville was the 181st most populous city in the United States.

== Economy ==
Naperville is within the Illinois Technology and Research Corridor. Employers contributing to the population explosion of the 1980s and 1990s included: Bell Labs and Western Electric (once Alcatel-Lucent, now Nokia), Amoco (now BP and Ineos), Nalco, Calamos, Nicor, and Edward Hospital. ConAgra's Grocery division branch office employs approximately 400 workers. Kraft Foods (now Mondelez International) opened their Naperville site in 1968, and employs over 200 individuals at the plant, which supplies all Triscuit products for North America.

Naperville is also home to the headquarters of Dukane Precast and its double-wall precast concrete manufacturing plant. Naperville was one of the nation's ten fastest-growing communities during the 1990s. It was home to the Office Max headquarters until the 2013 merger between Office Max and Office Depot. The former Office Max headquarters in Naperville was sold, as the merged company moved to Boca Raton.

The Naperville area is home to many retailers, restaurants and shopping centers, such as Downtown Naperville, Freedom Commons, Springbrook Prairie Pavilion, and the Route 59 and Ogden Avenue corridors. Naperville has over 11 automobile dealerships, and in October 2006, the city opened the country's first public–private partnership automobile test track, situated on a 9-acre (3.6 ha) course, at a cost of $1.5 million.

According to the 2019 American Community Survey, 77% of commuters drove, 11% took public transportation, and 8.6% worked from home. 22.1% of workers were employed in educational services, and health care and social assistance, 20.4% were employed in professional, scientific, and management, and administrative and waste management services, 10.3% in arts, entertainment, and recreation, and accommodation and food services, 9.7% in retail trade, and 9.5% in finance, insurance, and real estate and rental and leasing.

According to the city's 2020 Comprehensive Annual Financial Report, the city's top ten employers are:

#	Employer	# of Employees
1	Edward Hospital	4,500
2	Indian Prairie School District 204	3,071
3	Nokia	2,750
4	Naperville Community Unit School District 203	2,300
5	BP America	1,200
6	BMO Harris	1,200
7	Nalco	1,200
8	City of Naperville	933
9	North Central College	700
10	Coriant	600

== Arts and culture ==
=== Library ===
The Naperville Public Library has three library branches within city limits. In 2020, there were 61,476 active cardholders, there were 728,147 total library visits, and there were 2,973,939 checkouts. The Naperville Public Library was founded when James L. Nichols, a Naperville author, edutor, and college professor who bequeathed $10,000 to the City Of Naperville to establish a library after his death. On September 22, 1898, the Nichols Library formally opened. Its collection comprised over 700 books. With the population of Naperville growing, the original location was running out of space. In 1983 a referendum was passed to build a new library, and the new Nichols Library opened on March 11, 1986. As the population increased, the need for a new branch was evident. Land was acquired, and the upper floor of the Naper Boulevard Library opened to the public on December 29, 1992. South Naperville still had a gap in the Library's coverage, so the 95th Street Library was opened on September 21, 2003.

The Nichols Library is in downtown Naperville, on Jefferson Street. It opened at this location in March 1986. It is a 63,300 square feet (5,900 m^{2}) structure. The previous library building still stands on Washington Street, just south of the YMCA building (razed in 2022), at Washington and Van Buren. The Naper Boulevard Library was dedicated in December 1992 and underwent internal renovations in 2015. It is situated on Naper Boulevard, south of Scott Elementary School. It is the smallest of the three buildings at 32,000 square feet (3,000 m^{2}).

The 95th Street Library is near the intersection of 95th Street and Route 59 (just west of Neuqua Valley High School). Opened in September 2003, it is the newest and largest of the three facilities at 73,000 square feet (6,800 m^{2}) and features a modern architectural style.

=== Art ===
Naperville is home of the Naperville Independent Film Festival, an annual film festival which features the work of independent filmmakers. The Naperville Municipal Band is a nonprofit organization founded in 1859. They perform a summer concert series in Naperville's Central Park, as well as several other concerts around the city, and are made up of over 90 volunteer musicians. The Naperville Art League hosts the Riverwalk Fine Art Fair annually, and the event has been running since 1984. The Riverwalk Fine Art Fair hosts artists who work in forms such as painting, ceramic, wood, jewelry, fiber, photography, glass, and metal.

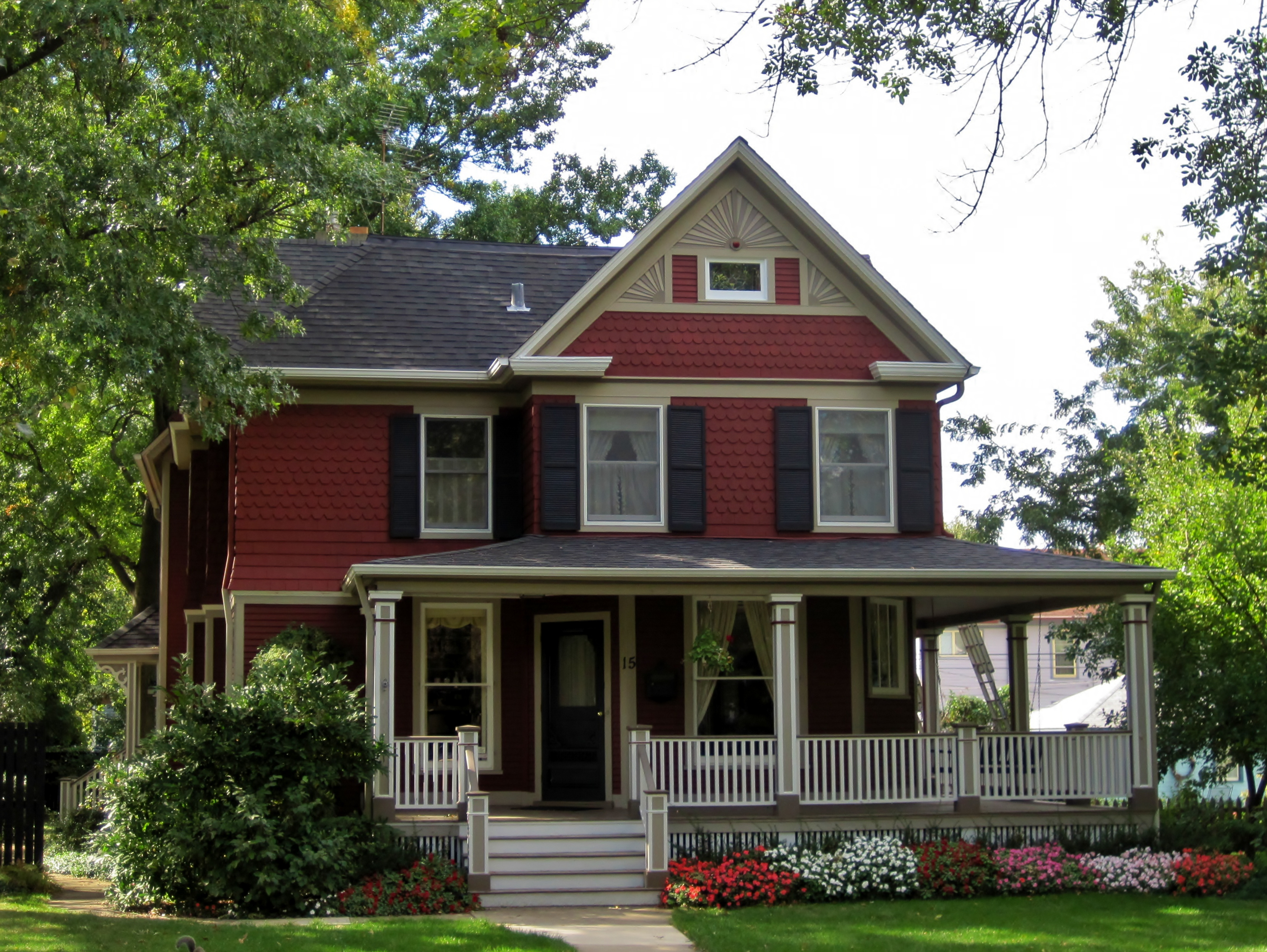
H. A. Unger House (built 1883), in the Naperville Historic District

The Century Walk Corporation, founded in 1996, is a nonprofit organization who commissions sculptures, murals and mosaics to be placed throughout the city. As of February 2021, the organization has placed 51 statues, and over $4 million worth of art. Notable statues include the 9 foot tall statue of comic book figure Dick Tracy, Laughing Lincoln, a life size statue of 30 year old Abraham Lincoln, and the Dan Shanower Sep 11 Memorial, which includes a steel beam from the World Trade Center and rubble from the Pentagon.

=== Historical preservation ===
The Naperville Historic District is a set of 573 buildings in the older eastern section of Naperville and is listed on the National Register of Historic Places. It was listed on the NRHP on September 29, 1977, and It was granted local district designation by the Naperville City Council in 1986. The buildings represent significant examples of local architecture and are among the city's most important cultural and historical heritage. The Old Nichols Library building, which served as Naperville's original public library, was designated a local landmark in 2017. Naper Settlement is an outdoor history museum representing the era of Naperville's founding. Naper Settlement was established by the Naperville Heritage Society and the Naperville Park District in 1969 to preserve some of the community's oldest buildings. Reconstructions of Fort Payne and the Pre-Emption House stand as part of the museum.

=== Moser Tower and Millennium Carillon ===
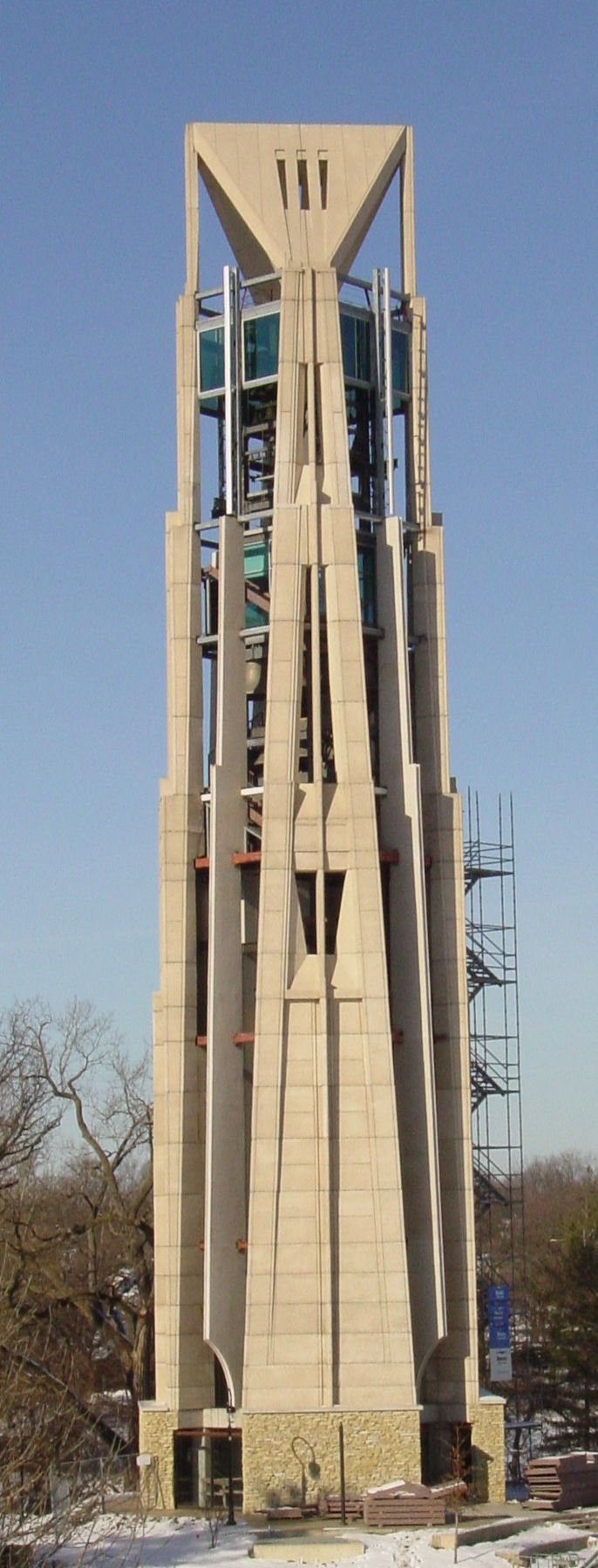
Moser Tower, completed in 2000, containing the Millennium Carillon

The 158-foot-tall Moser Tower is just north of Aurora Avenue and at the base of Rotary Hill, just west of Downtown Naperville. The Millennium Carillon is designated as one of the four largest carillons in the world, with 72 bronze bells weighing from 10 pounds to the 6-ton "Captain Joseph Naper Bell". It was dedicated in an Independence Day event on June 29, 2000, with a reception attended by over 15,000 people. The carillon is manually or computer-playable, with most performances played by hand, but with half the bells played by a computer-controlled system at set times during the day.

=== Other museums ===
The DuPage Children's Museum was founded in 1987 and moved from Wheaton to its Naperville location in 2001. The Museum was rebuilt and redesigned in 2015.

== Parks and recreation ==
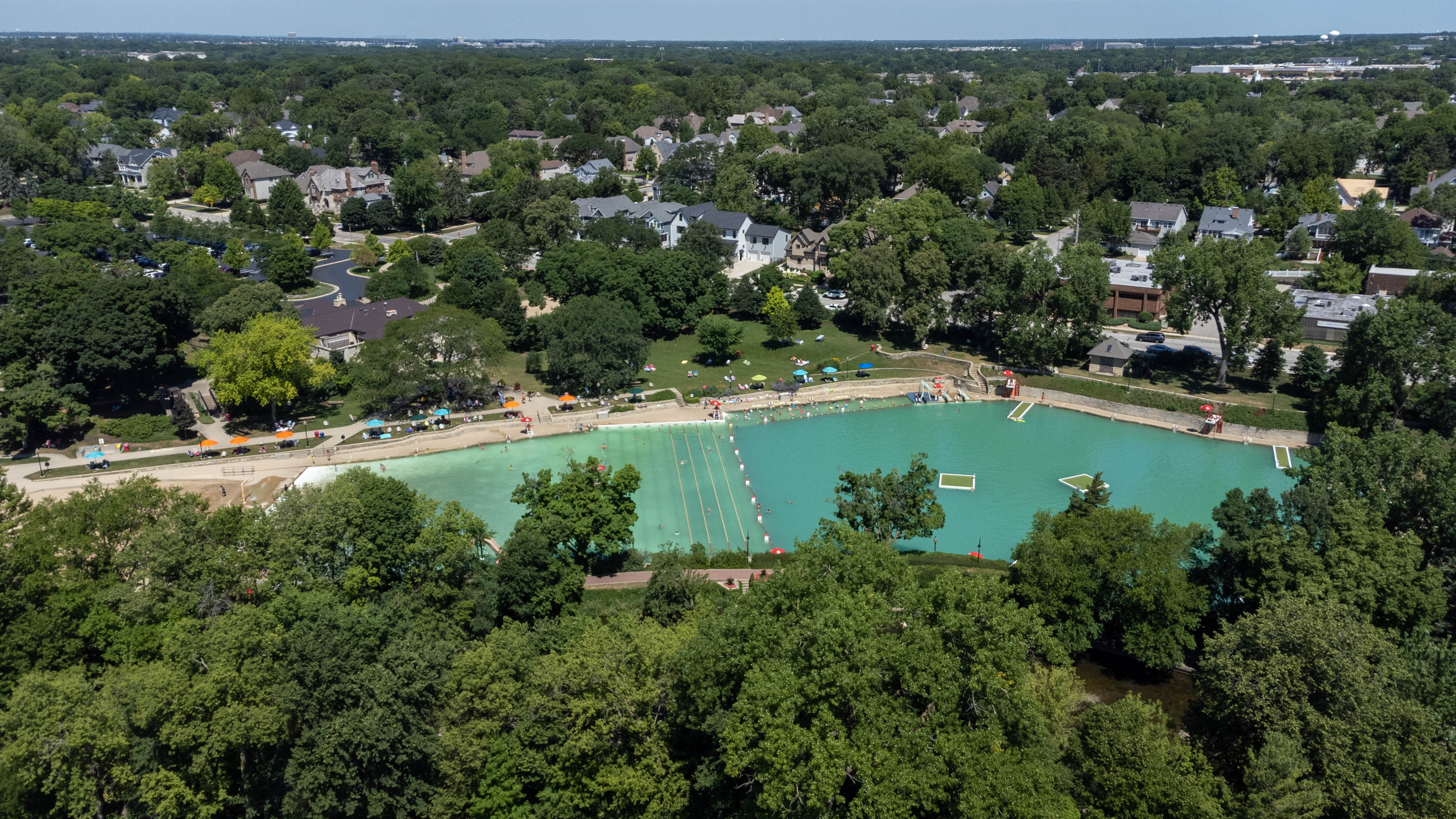
Centennial Beach

=== Naperville Park District ===
The Naperville Park District manages and provides leisure and recreational activities for Naperville and nearby residents. The District was established by referendum in 1966, but a current park, Centennial Beach, was founded in 1932. As of 2021, the Park District manages over 2,400 acres (10 km^{2}) of open space, including over 136 parks, two golf courses, 73 playgrounds, and 70+ miles of trails.

==== Riverwalk ====
The Park District is responsible for the Naperville Riverwalk, construction of which began in 1981, marking the 150th anniversary of the first Joseph Naper's settlement. The Naperville Riverwalk is 1.75 miles (2.82 km) long and runs along the West Branch of the DuPage River. It consists of brick paths, fountains, and covered bridges. In addition, the Riverwalk features fountains, art pieces, and nearby restaurants. The Naperville Riverwalk Commission has started a plan to expand the Riverwalk greatly, in the "Riverwalk 2031 Master Plan." Some of the details of this plan includes extending the Riverwalk to Edward Hospital, building a new park, and creating an east bank Riverwalk path from the Highlands subdivision.

==== Other facilities ====
The Naperville Park District also manages other properties. Centennial Beach is a former quarry redeveloped into a beach. Springbrook and Naperbrook are the two golf courses managed by the Park District. There are two parks dedicated to skateboarding and in-line skating, Frontier Sports Complex and Centennial Park. Commissioners Park, includes Naperville's first official cricket pitch, opened in 2006. Ron Ory Community Garden Plots offers garden plots to lease for a fee during the summer. Knoch Knolls Park includes a small mountain biking trail and eighteen-hole frisbee golf course. It is located south between Ring Road and 95th Street. Naperville Sportsman's Club is a public trap shooting range, the fees are $15.50 for club members, $16.75 for residents, and $18.00 for nonresidents.

=== Forest Preserve District of DuPage County ===
The Forest Preserve District of DuPage County manages several forest preserves and parks that are within Naperville. Springbrook Prairie is 1,829 acres (740 ha) acres of land, it contains 13 miles (21 km) of trails, Greene Valley Forest Preserve is a former landfill and farm, it is composed of 1,388 acres (562 ha), and has 12 miles (19 km) of trails. Herrick Lake Forest Preserve is composed of 887 acres (359 ha) and has 7 miles (11 km) trails. McDowell Grove Forest Preserve is composed of 465 acres (188 ha), and has 7 miles (11 km) of trails. Pioneer Park is the location of the Hobson Monument and grist mill. A section of the DuPage River Trail runs through the park, and is used for walking, running, and cycling. Access to the DuPage River for fishing, canoeing, and kayaking is also available at the park. The Forest Preserve District of Will County manages Whalon Lake Forest Preserve, where trails and lake access is available.

== Government ==
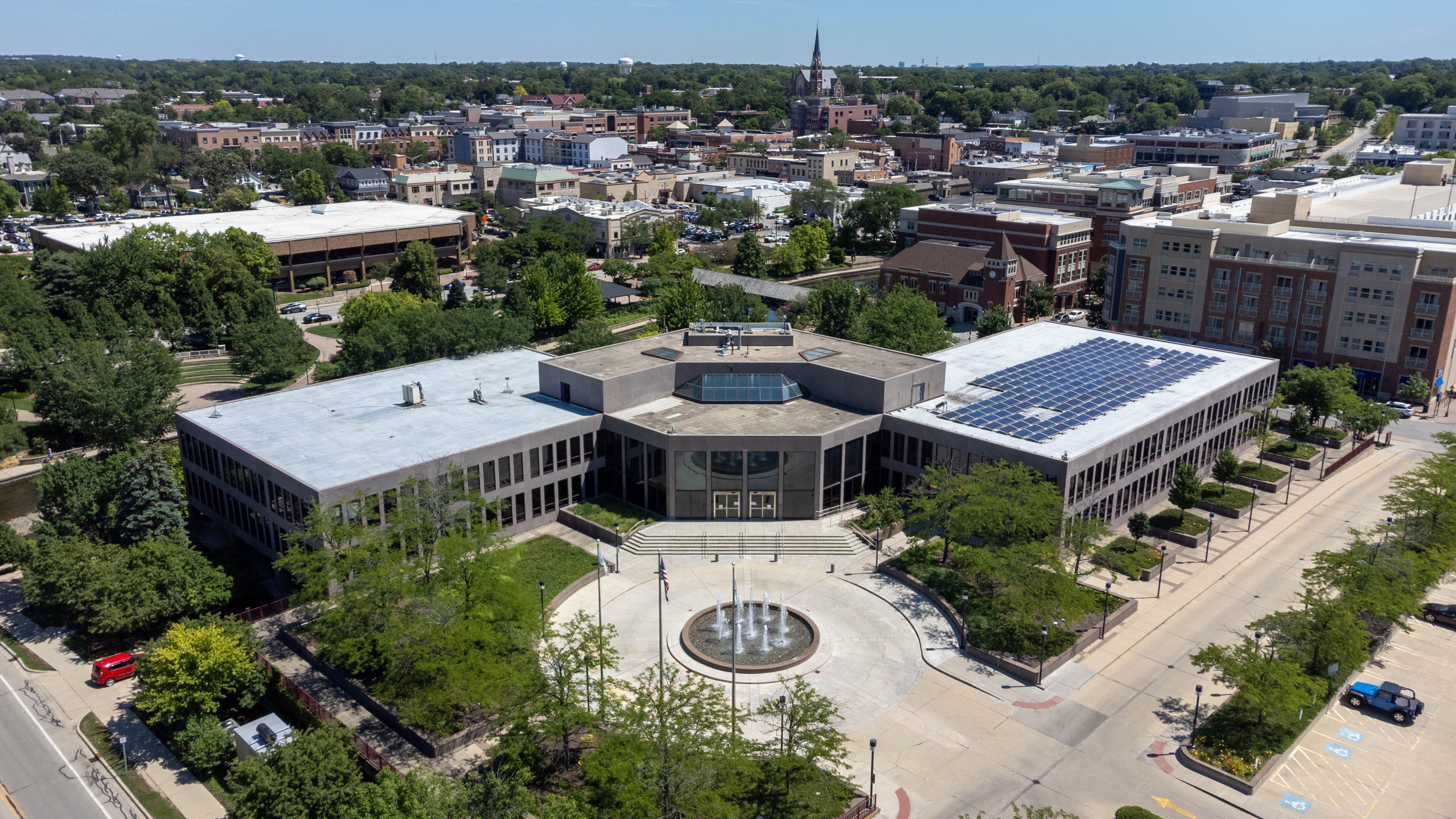
Naperville's City Hall

The City of Naperville operates under the council-manager form of government. The City Council consists of the Mayor and eight Council Members elected for four-year terms. No person can serve in the office of mayor or council member for excess of three consecutive terms. The city council can select and appoint a city manager, adopt, amend, and repeal ordinances, and can approve the city's annual operating budget. The mayor acts as a member of the city council, with extra responsibilities. The Mayor presides over city council meetings, they function as the local Liquor and Tobacco Control Commissioner, they can declare emergencies, and can select members for City boards and commissions. The city manager enforces all laws and ordinances of the city, they recommend courses of action to the council, and controls all departments throughout the city.

Mayor Scott Wehrli (R) is the current mayor of Naperville and has been serving since 2023. Former Mayor George Pradel (also known as "Officer Friendly") served for 20 years, making him the longest serving mayor in Naperville History.

In 2021, a $540 million budget was approved for 2022. The budget was a 7.6% increase from the previous year. Roughly $32 million of the $38 million went towards infrastructure improvements. In 2020, the City employed 933 employees.

=== Taxes ===
In 2020, the equalized assessed value for the city was $137,000, and the city property tax was 0.6949%, this resulted in a $875.11 average property tax paid. Naperville collects a local gas tax at the price of four cents per gallon. A Retail Sales Tax is in place, with a .75% tax applying on general merchandise, and food for immediate consumption. Naperville has a 1% tax on all food and beverages that can be consumed at the location purchased. In addition to the citywide tax, a .75% percent tax is added onto the existing 1% when the food or beverage is purchased within Downtown Naperville. All Real Estate Transfers are subject to a tax, but are exempt to for owners making deed changes. The tax is $1.50 per $500 of the purchase price, rounding the purchase price up in increments of $500. All uses of hotel and motels are subject tax of the rate of 5.50% of the room rate. State collected Income Taxes, Sales Taxes, and the State Motor Fuel Tax proceeds are doled out to municipalities on a per-capita basis. The total State Use Tax rate is 6.25%, and the State of Illinois collects $0.392 cents per gallon of gasoline sold, and $0.467 per gallon of diesel fuel sold. All funds from the Gas Tax are only meant to be used on roads and bridges.

=== State and Federal Representation ===
Presidential election results in Naperville
Year	Democratic	Republican	Others
2020	61.9% 51,140	36.2% 29,926	1.9% 1,593
2016	54.9% 39,432	37.0% 26,577	8.1% 5,857

Naperville is represented by two U.S. Senators, three U.S. Representatives, four Illinois Senators, and six Illinois Representatives.

U.S. Senators:

- Dick Durbin (D)
- Tammy Duckworth (D)

U.S. Representatives:

- Bill Foster, 11th District (D)
- Sean Casten, 6th District (D)
- Lauren Underwood, 14th District (D)

Illinois Senate:

- Laura Ellman, 21st District (D)
- John Curran, 41st District (R)
- Linda Holmes, 42nd District (D)
- Karina Villa, 25th District (D)

Illinois Representatives:

- Janet Yang Rohr, 41st District (D)
- Amy Grant, 42nd District (R)
- Barbara Hernandez, 83rd District (D)
- Maura Hirschauer, 49th District (D)
- Stephanie Kifowit, 84th District (D)
- Anne Stava-Murray, 81st District (D)

== Education ==
=== Colleges and universities ===
Naperville has multiple colleges and universities within its city limits. North Central College is on a 59-acre (24 ha) campus in Downtown Naperville on Chicago Avenue. It was founded by a predecessor to the United Methodist Church in 1861 and has been in Naperville since 1870. The college remains affiliated with the United Methodist Church. In fall 2020, it had 2,832 students enrolled. Northern Illinois University maintains a satellite campus on Diehl Road offering several courses. The College of DuPage, DuPage County's Community College, operates the Naperville Regional Center which offers several classes. DeVry University has their administrative headquarters, and classrooms on Diehl Road in Naperville. Governors State University maintains a satellite campus on West 95th Street in Naperville. Indiana Tech maintains a satellite campus on North Aurora Road.

=== Primary and secondary schools ===
Multiple K-12 public school districts serve the city of Naperville, along with a number of private and parochial schools. In DuPage County, the largest portions of Naperville are in the Naperville Community Unit District 203 and the Indian Prairie Community Unit School District 204 school districts. A small piece extends into the Community Unit School District 200. In Will County, portions of Naperville are in the Indian Prairie and Naperville districts, as well as Plainfield School District 202 and Valley View Community Unit School District 365U.

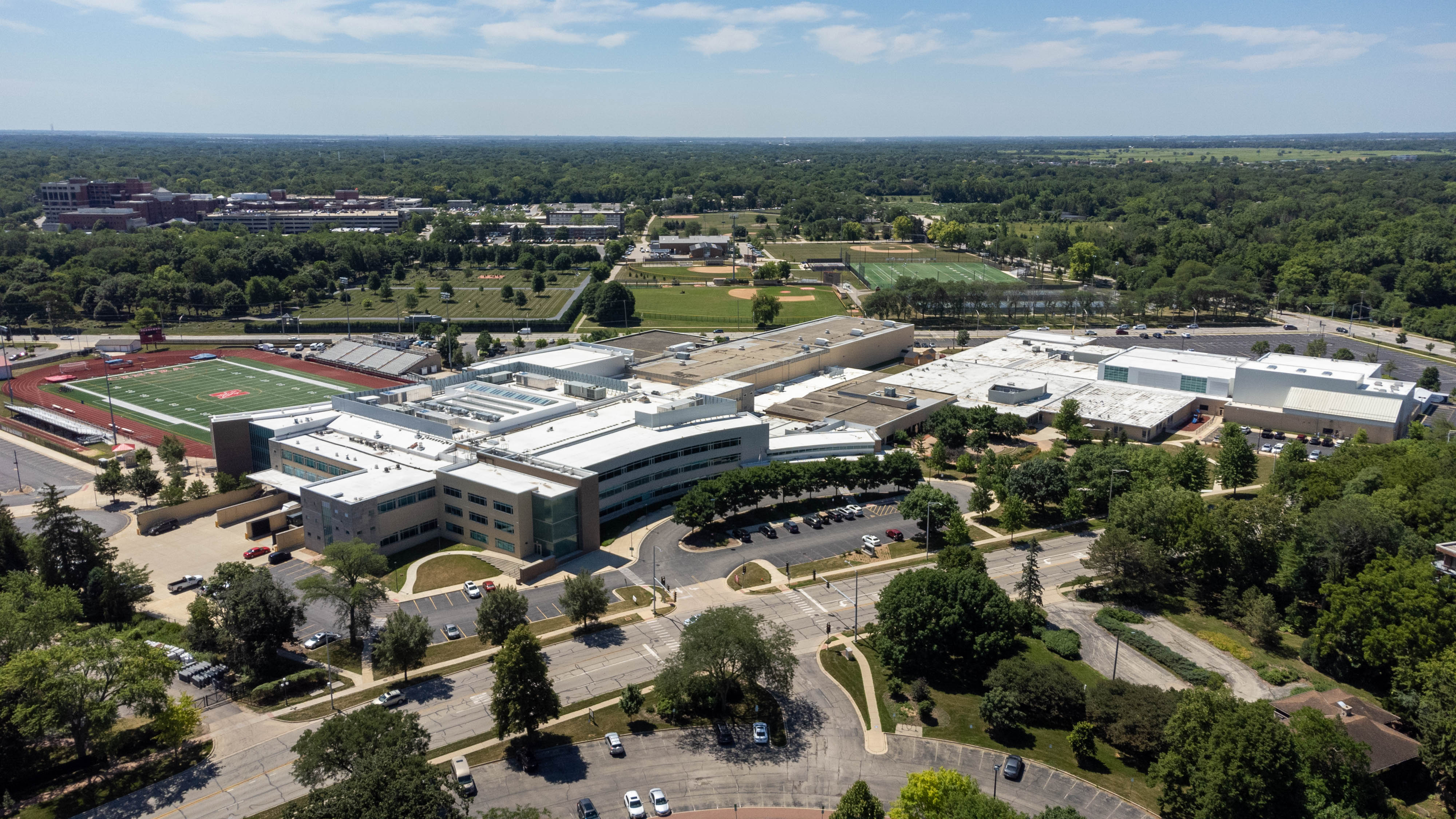
Naperville Central High School

Naperville Community Unit School District 203, headquartered in Naperville, serves central and northern Naperville as well as portions of the neighboring Lisle and Bolingbrook. The oldest District 203 building still in use is Ellsworth Elementary, constructed in 1928, while the newest is the Ann Reid Early Childhood Center, opened in 2010. District 203 has two high schools: Naperville Central High School and Naperville North High School, five junior high schools and fifteen elementary schools within Naperville city limits. Additionally, the school district has one junior high and one elementary school in Lisle.

Indian Prairie School District 204 (IPSD) was also formed through merged districts in 1972. Neuqua Valley High School, along with three middle schools and 19 elementary schools from this district, are located within southern Naperville. In total, IPSD runs three high schools (Neuqua Valley High School, Metea Valley High School, and Waubonsie Valley High School), seven junior high schools, 21 elementary schools, and one preschool. The district serves western and southwestern Naperville, along with eastern Aurora and parts of Bolingbrook and Plainfield.

Naperville is home to numerous private schools, including, All Saints Catholic Academy, Bethany Lutheran School, Calvary Christian School, Covenant Classical School, Naperville Christian Academy, St. Raphael School, and Saints Peter and Paul School.

== Media ==
Naperville has a community access TV station, Naperville Community Television (NCTV17). The station airs community-based programming that includes news, sports, talk shows, and community event coverage. It broadcasts on Channel 17 in Naperville and online at NCTV17.org.

The Daily Herald is a daily newspaper serving suburban Chicago. It was started in 1872 and founded by Hosea Paddock. The Naperville Sun is a local newspaper serving Naperville, Illinois. It is published three days a week, Wednesday, Friday and Sunday. It was founded in 1935 and now is owned by Chicago Tribune Media Group.

Naperville has multiple radio stations, including 1610-AM WPFP 929, AM 1610, which broadcasts emergency, city and road information. WONC (89.1 FM) broadcasts in an album oriented rock format, and is owned and operated by North Central College. WCKG (1530 AM) broadcasts local news, talk shows, and weather reports.

== Infrastructure ==
=== Health systems ===
Edward Hospital in Naperville, Illinois, was first established in 1907 as Edward Sanitarium, and became Edward Hospital in 1955. It merged with Elmhurst Hospital in 2013 to create Edward-Elmhurst Health. Edward Hospital is a full-service hospital with 352 private patient rooms. For many years, Edward Hospital and others have tried to introduce a new hospital into Naperville, only to have their request turned down. Thus, Naperville remains the only large Illinois city with only one hospital. Edward Hospital tried to open a hospital in nearby Plainfield to help Naperville citizens with travel times to Edward Hospital. Duly Health and Care, formerly DuPage Medical Group, has 16 locations in Naperville. The University of Chicago Medical Center has two Naperville locations providing pediatric and ENT services.

=== Transportation ===
==== Roads ====
The Ronald Reagan Memorial Tollway (the tolled portion of Interstate 88) passes through northern Naperville. US Route 34 (Ogden Avenue) enters Naperville in the west at Illinois Route 59. A diverging diamond interchange, the first in Northeast Illinois, was completed in 2015 at the junction of Route 59 and Interstate 88.

===== Interstates =====
- I-88

===== U.S. Highwways =====
- US 34

===== Illinois Highways =====
- IL 59
- IL 110 (CKC)

===== County Highways =====
- DuPage County
  - CR 1 (Plainfield-Naperville Road)
  - CR 1 (Raymond Drive)
  - CR 2 (Hobson Road)
  - CR 3 (Warrenville Road, Ferry Road)
  - CR 17 (Maple Avenue, Chicago Avenue)
  - CR 23 (Naper Boulevard, Naperville Road)
  - CR 32 (Mill Street)
  - CR 33 (75th Street)
  - CR 40 (Wehrli Road, College Road)
  - CR 51 (Herrick Road)
  - CR 53 (Diehl Road)
  - CR 59 (Freedom Drive)
- Will County
  - CR 14 (Plainfield-Naperville Road)
  - CR 66 (Hassert Boulevard)
  - CR 89 (95th Street)

==== Train service ====
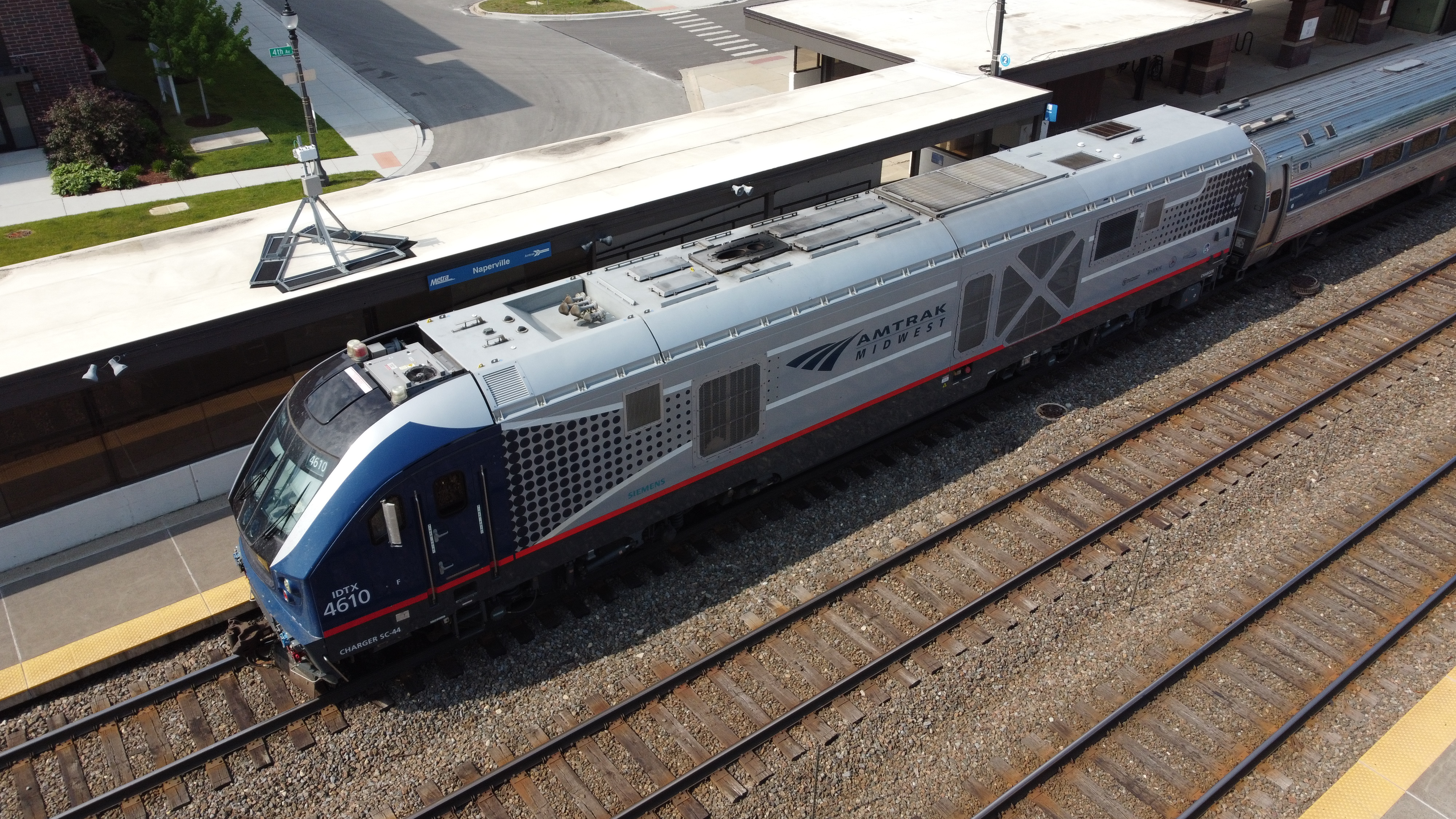
Amtrak train at the Naperville station

Naperville's first rail link to Chicago was established in 1864 by the Chicago, Burlington and Quincy Railroad. Naperville now has three tracks belonging to the BNSF Railway that run through the north end of town, with passenger rail service provided by Metra and Amtrak. Amtrak's four daily trains through Naperville are the Illinois Zephyr and Carl Sandburg (both destined for Quincy, Illinois), the California Zephyr (destined for Emeryville, California), and the Southwest Chief (destined for Los Angeles). A third Metra station was planned on the Suburban Transit Access Route ("STAR") at Wolf's Crossing. The project is no longer active since 2012.

In the 1990s, Naperville was one of six communities that competed to receive a prototype personal rapid transit system that the Regional Transit Authority was planning to build. A proposal by Rosemont was instead selected, and such a system was ultimately never built.

==== Bus service ====
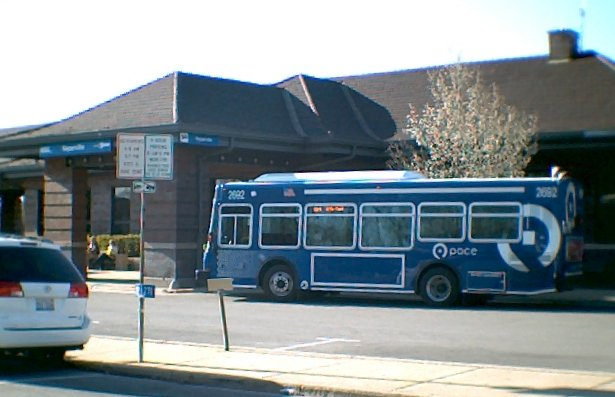
Pace bus at the Naperville Amtrak/Metra station

Pace provides rush hour bus service to the Metra stations, and previously, through 2008, had provided for local midday service. Both services have always been operated under contract; First Student, a national transportation management firm, is the current contract operator. In addition, Pace directly operates bus route 530 from Naperville to Aurora (which serves Aurora's Fox Valley Mall) and bus route 714 from Naperville to Wheaton (which serves the College of DuPage), both through its Fox Valley division. Pace also directly operates route 888, a rush hour express route named the "Tri-State Flyer", from Homewood and South Holland to corporate employment sites in the western suburbs, including those in the northern part of Naperville; this route is operated by Pace through its South division. Intercity bus service in Naperville consists of a route from Chicago and Naperville to Davenport, Iowa, and points further west, operated by both Burlington Trailways and Greyhound Lines. The Burlington Trailways buses stop at the Naperville Metra and Amtrak station, downtown on Fourth Avenue; the Greyhound Lines buses stop at the Route 59 Metra station.

==== Airport ====
The DuPage Airport, a general aviation airport serving private and charter jets, designation DPA, is 14 miles from downtown Naperville. Clow Airport in Bolingbrook is about 1.5 miles from Naperville's southeastern border.

There is also a private airport, the Naper Aero Club field, designation LL10, on the western edge of town. The field is notable as the home of the Lima Lima Flight Team.

=== Electricity ===
Naperville's electric system is owned and operated by the City of Naperville, which obtains electricity through the Illinois Municipal Electric Agency, a nonprofit government entity.

== Sister cities ==
- Nitra, Slovakia since November 17, 1993.
- Pátzcuaro, Mexico since November 13, 2010.
- Cancún, Mexico since May 27, 2021.
