= Moser Tower and Millennium Carillon =

Bell tower and carillon in Naperville, Illinois, US

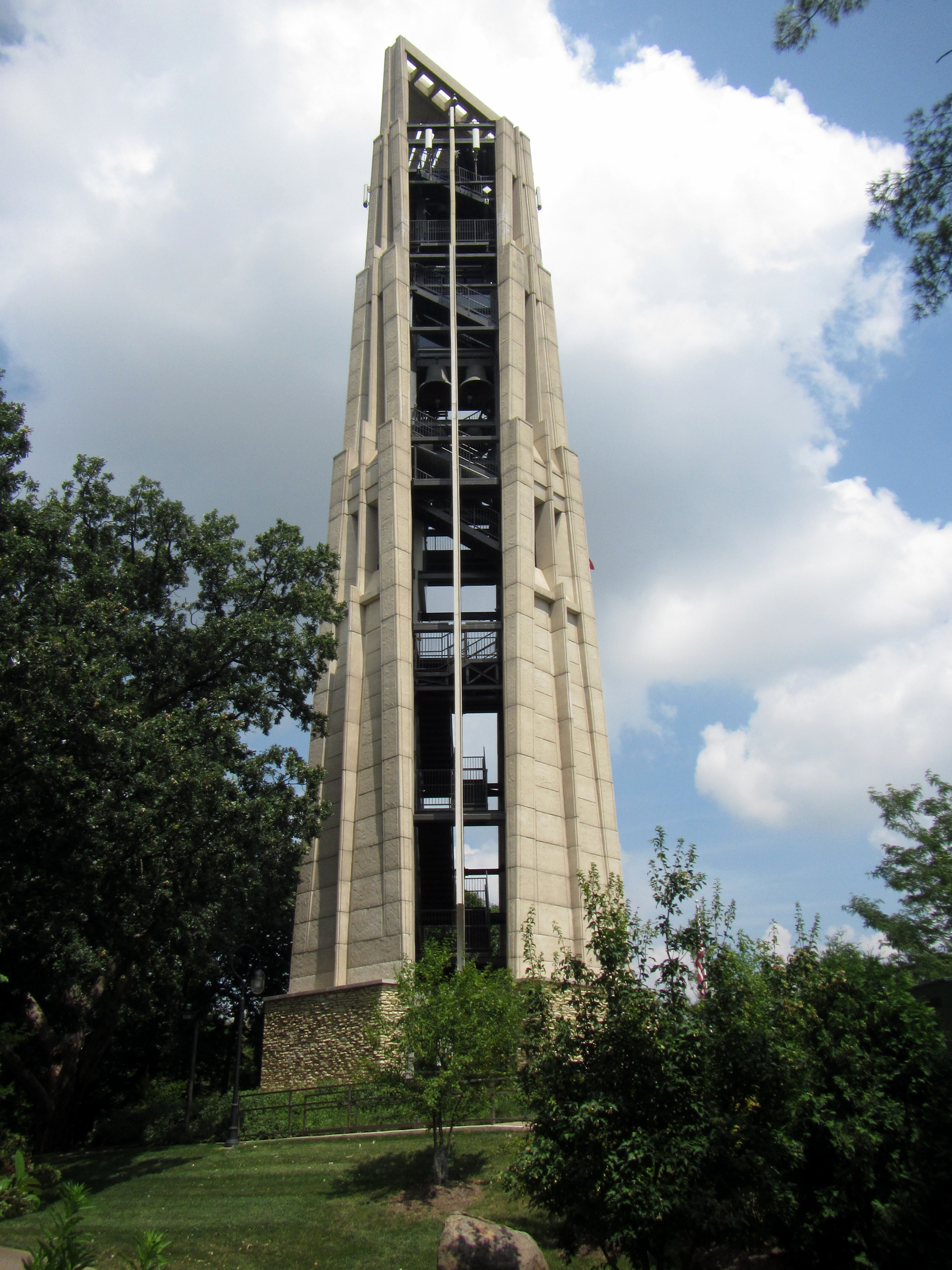
- Interactive map of the Moser Tower and Millennium Carillon area

General information
- Location: 443 Aurora Avenue, Naperville, Illinois, United States
- Coordinates: 41°46′12″N 88°09′24″W
- Construction started: 1997
- Construction stopped: 1999, 2007
- Topped-out: 1999
- Opened: June 2000
- Cost: $7.1 million
- Owner: City of Naperville

Height
- Height: 160 feet (49 m)

Technical details
- Material: Concrete
- Lifts/elevators: 1 (installed in 2007)

Website
- http://www.naperville-carillon.org/

Moser Tower (often referred to as the Naperville Bell Tower) is a structure built in Naperville, Illinois, United States. It was built in 1999 to commemorate the third millennium and 21st century. It is 160 feet (49 m) tall and contains the Millennium Carillon, a carillon of 72 bells. The carillon structure is said to be one of the four largest in the United States.

== History ==
A former fundraiser called the Millennium Carillon began fundraising and later started construction in 1997. The entire project cost about $7.1 million, which was triple the amount that was collected and proposed. Construction was finished in 1999. However to open in year 2000, they decided not to surround the bottom in glass and not to install an elevator.

In 2007, the city of Naperville took over maintenance of the structure and also added unfinished parts, including installing an elevator. The fundraiser became defunct, however the debts and costs to complete the structure were estimated at $5 million.

In June 2017, possible structural issues were found. It was found that the structure may become unsafe in the future.

Repairs to the structure began in spring of 2021, they are expected to be completed by fall of 2021.

== Structural issues ==
Structural issues were found in June 2017. Cracks in the concrete were found, and the steel support began corroding. It was at first proposed to last at least 100 years, however it was not expected that the concrete could not hold up well and that the steel support would corrode. After conducting tests and inspection at the cost of $50,000, an estimated $3 million is required to repair the structure, or $660 thousand to demolish it.

In April 2018, it remained unknown whether the structure will be demolished or repaired. Costs for repair are high; however many argue that costs to build the structure were higher, and the structure is considered iconic for the city of Naperville. In February 2020, it was decided through a unanimous decision to repair and continue maintaining the tower for $1.5 million.

Starting in the spring of 2021, StruxC-MC, LLC began work to fix corroded structural steel, cracked concrete and other issues discovered with the 160-foot-tall Moser Tower. The bid was awarded with a price tag of about $2.1 million. Included in the price tag is also repairs to the nearby river walk. As of 2024, this work is not yet complete.

== Gallery ==
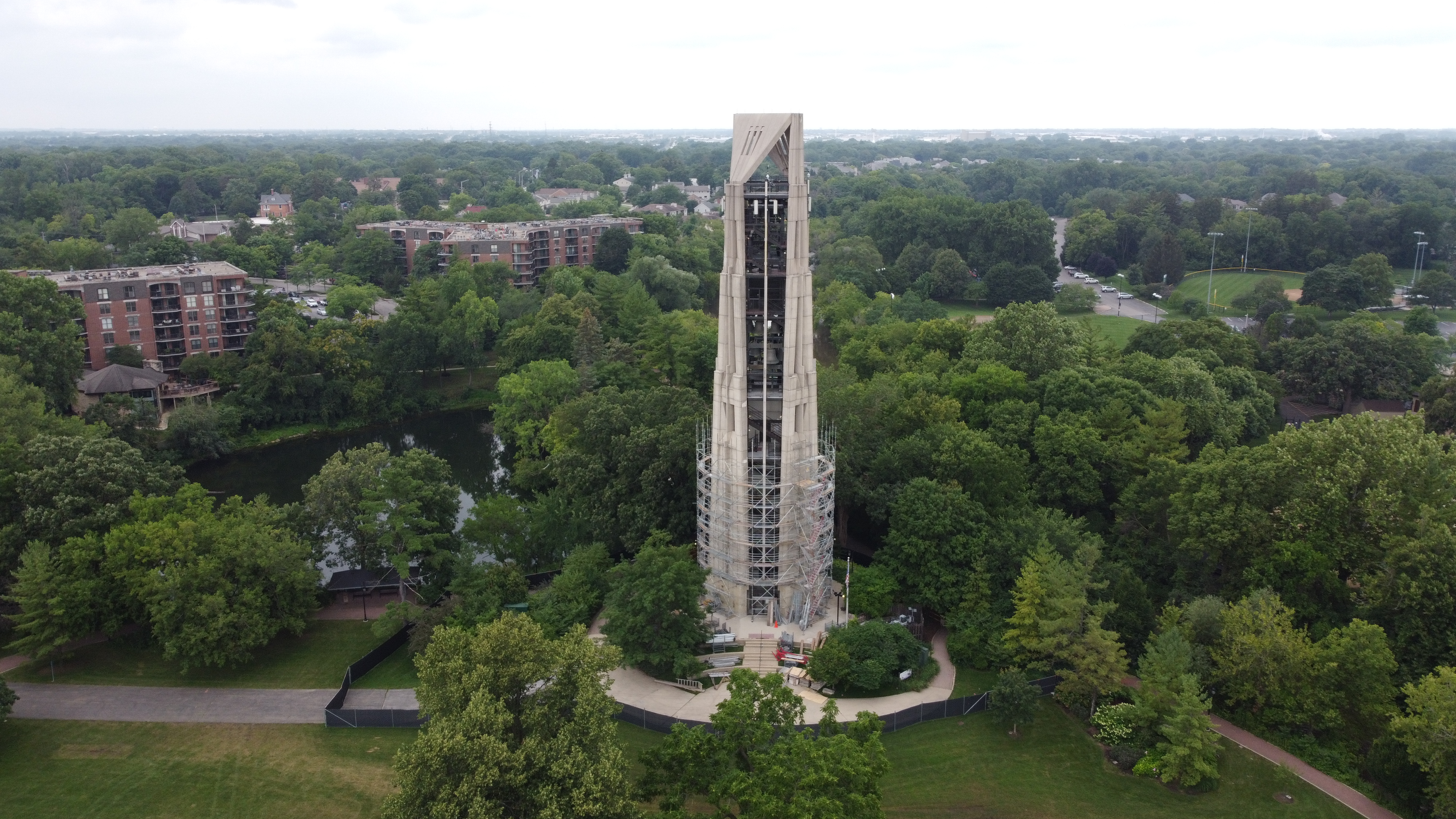
Moser Tower and Millennium Carillon under repair work in July 2021

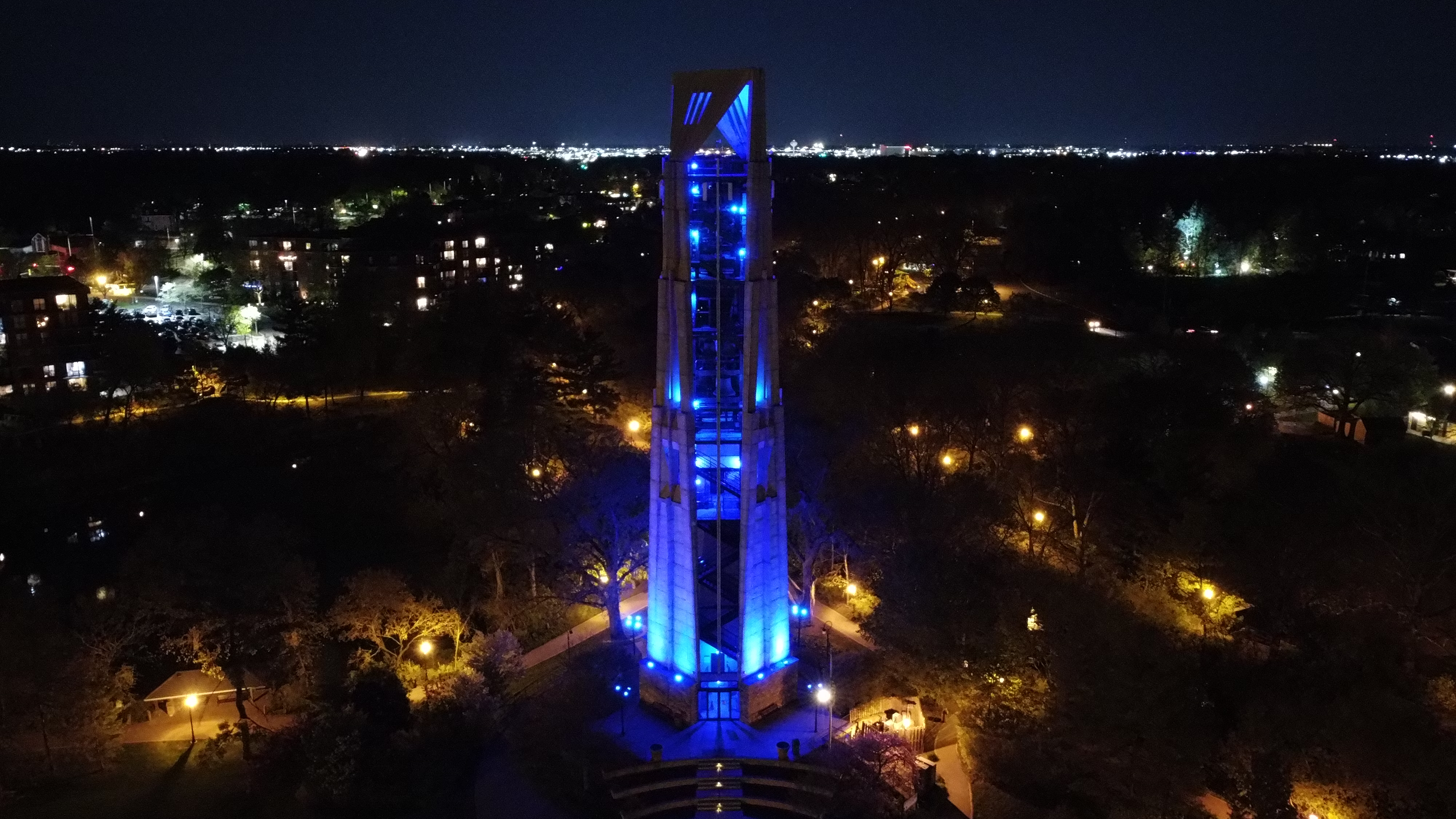
Moser Tower and Millennium Carillon at night.

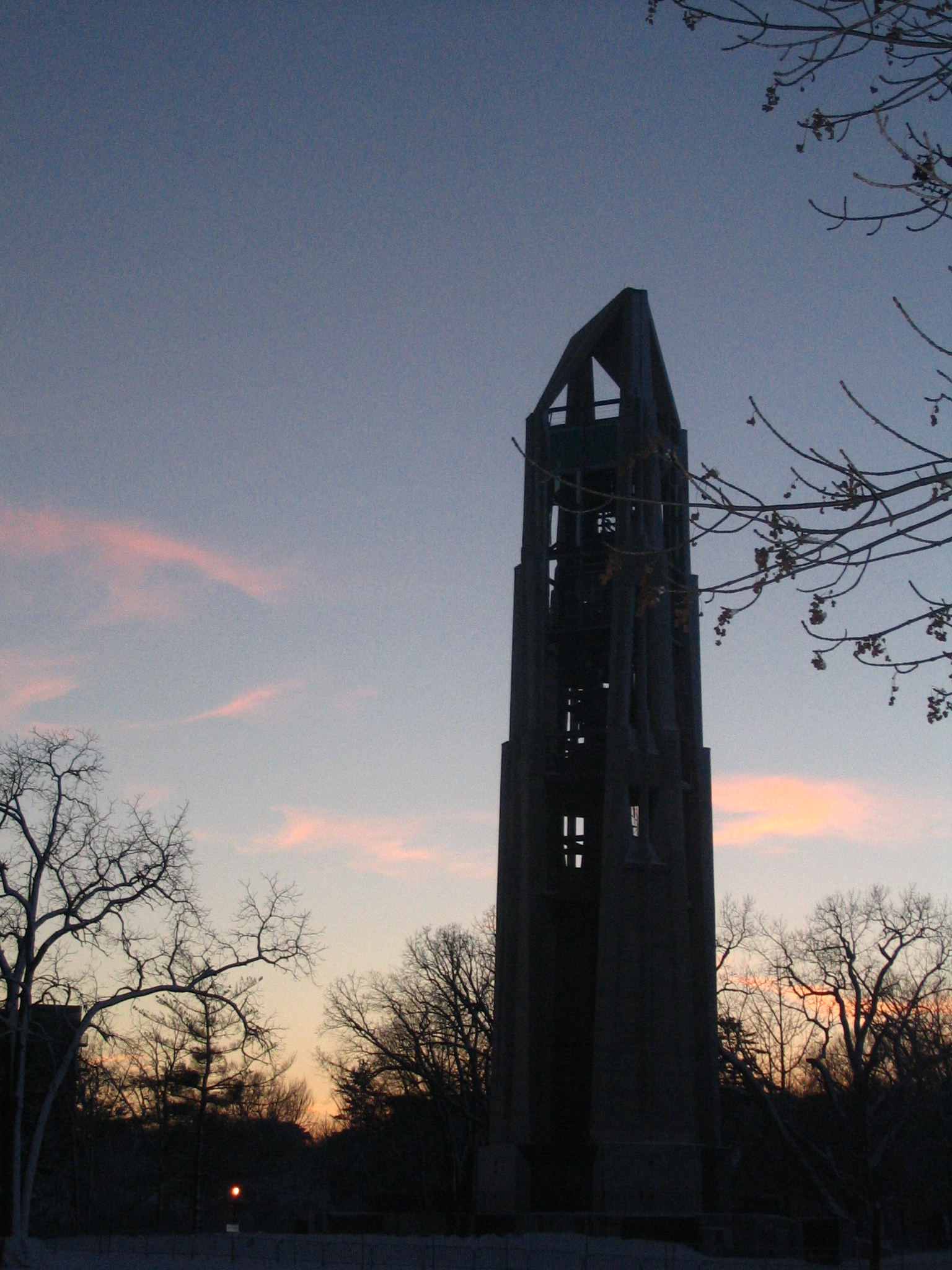
Moser Tower and Millennium Carillon at dusk.

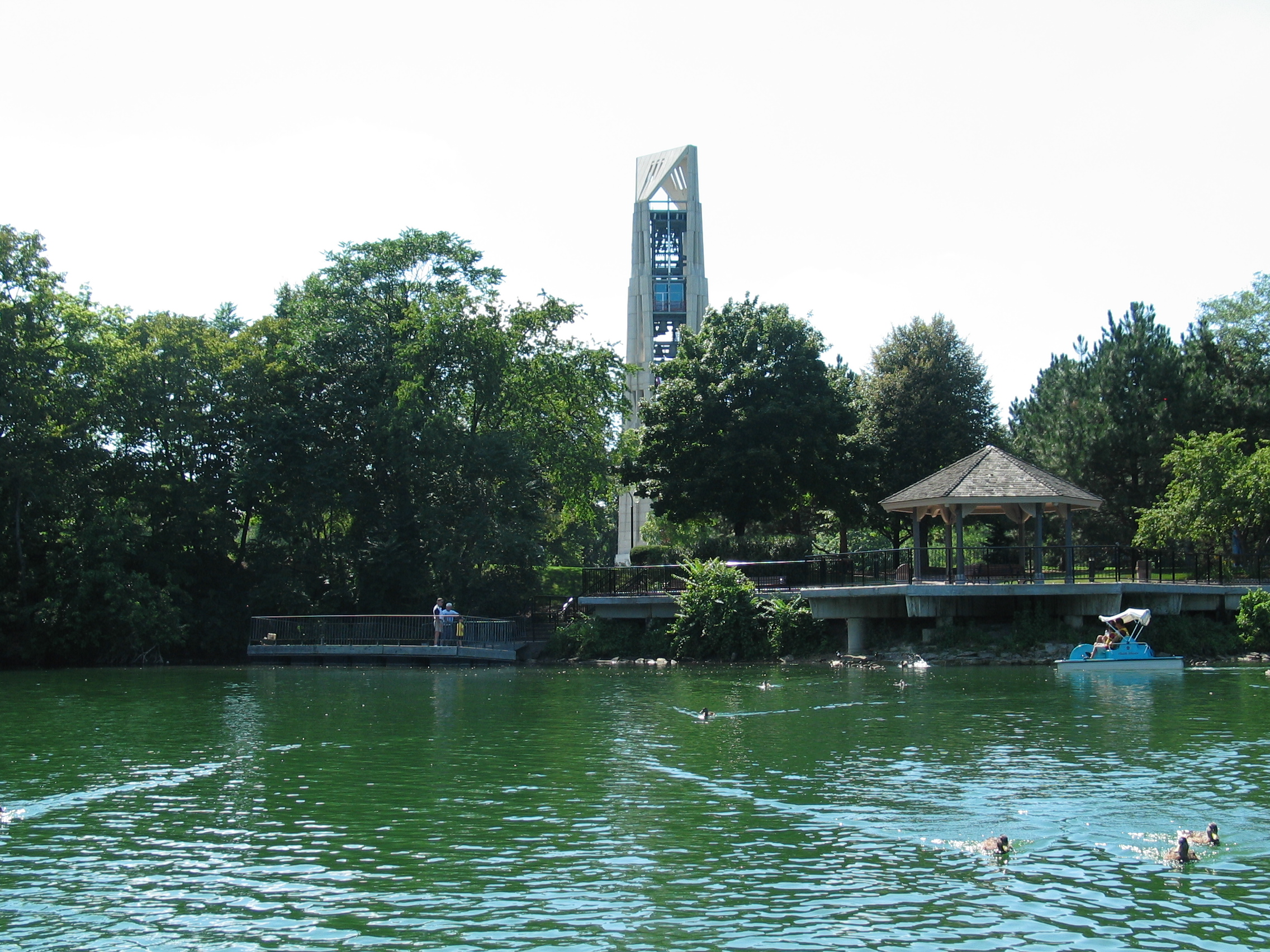
Moser Tower and Millennium Carillon from the paddleboat quarry.
