= Naperville Community Television =

Cable Access Television Station

Naperville Community Television (NCTV17) is a public-access cable television station, in Naperville, Illinois, United States, producing original content focused on community interests in the subject areas of local news, sports, and events. In addition to broadcasting on traditional cable television outlets, Channel 17 on Comcast and Astound, and Channel 99 on AT&T, all programming is available without a paywall via simulcast or by video-on-demand through the station’s website. The station also publishes local news through three different email newsletters: NCTV17 News Update, covering top local stories on weekdays; NCTV17 Guide, a monthly newsletter; and Football Friday, providing video recap of game highlights of six local high school teams. Each newsletter is offered free to subscribers.

== History ==
Naperville Community Television was incorporated in 1986 as a 501(c)(3) not-for-profit corporation. Broadcasting began in 1987 from a 2,200-square-foot studio.

With some assistance from cable television companies, community producers developed early programming on a volunteer basis. Subject matter included public-service messaging and taped events, and topics ranged from talk shows focusing on high school sports to fictional soap operas.

In 2005, NCTV17 moved to its current location, a 6,000-square-foot studio at 127 Ambassador Drive, Suite 103, Naperville, Illinois.

Elizabeth “Liz” Braham Spencer, an award-winning television producer, joined NCTV17 as Operations Manager, in 2002. She was promoted to executive director in 2006.

In March 2007, NCTV17 began streaming live broadcasts over the internet. The station also began posting programs on social media outlets, creating on-demand programming that was not limited to the cable system viewing audience.

== Programming ==
In addition to coverage of local elections, sporting events, parades, and other local news, NCTV17 produces a variety of original programming.

=== Current Shows ===
Naperville Sports Weekly covers both boys' and girls' varsity sports from all six Naperville-area high schools: Benet Academy, Naperville Central, Naperville North, Neuqua Valley, Metea Valley, and Waubonsie Valley. Episodes feature game highlights and sports stories as well as special segments like the "Player Profile," "Where Are They Now," "Coaches Corner," and the "Play of the Week." The show has an in-studio discussion forum that dives into interesting and trending sports topics relevant to students, athletes, and fans.

Spotlight every bi-weekly episode showcases three of the more than 300 Naperville-area nonprofits giving them the opportunity to talk about their mission and the programs and services they offer to the community.

Business Profiles gives local business owners and entrepreneurs a platform to tell their stories in a TV interview format.

=== Past Shows ===
Business Connection broadcasts interviews with local business owners and entrepreneurs to discuss their businesses, their products and services, and their involvement in the Naperville community.

Dana Being Dana a monthly talk show hosted by radio personality, Dana Davenport, focused on topics that explore how viewers can live their best lives.

The Red Zone covers North Central College football.

Naperville Moms Network a talk show with a panel of mothers representing various parenting stages and lifestyles offering discussion and sharing advice on situations they face.

Authors Revealed hosted by Becky Anderson, local bookstore owner and past president of the American Booksellers Association (ABA), interviews contemporary authors, including celebrity authors such as Jamie Lee Curtis, Joel McHale, Julie Andrews.
