= Naperville Park District =

Park district in Illinois, United States

Coordinates: 41°46′18″N 88°9′18″W

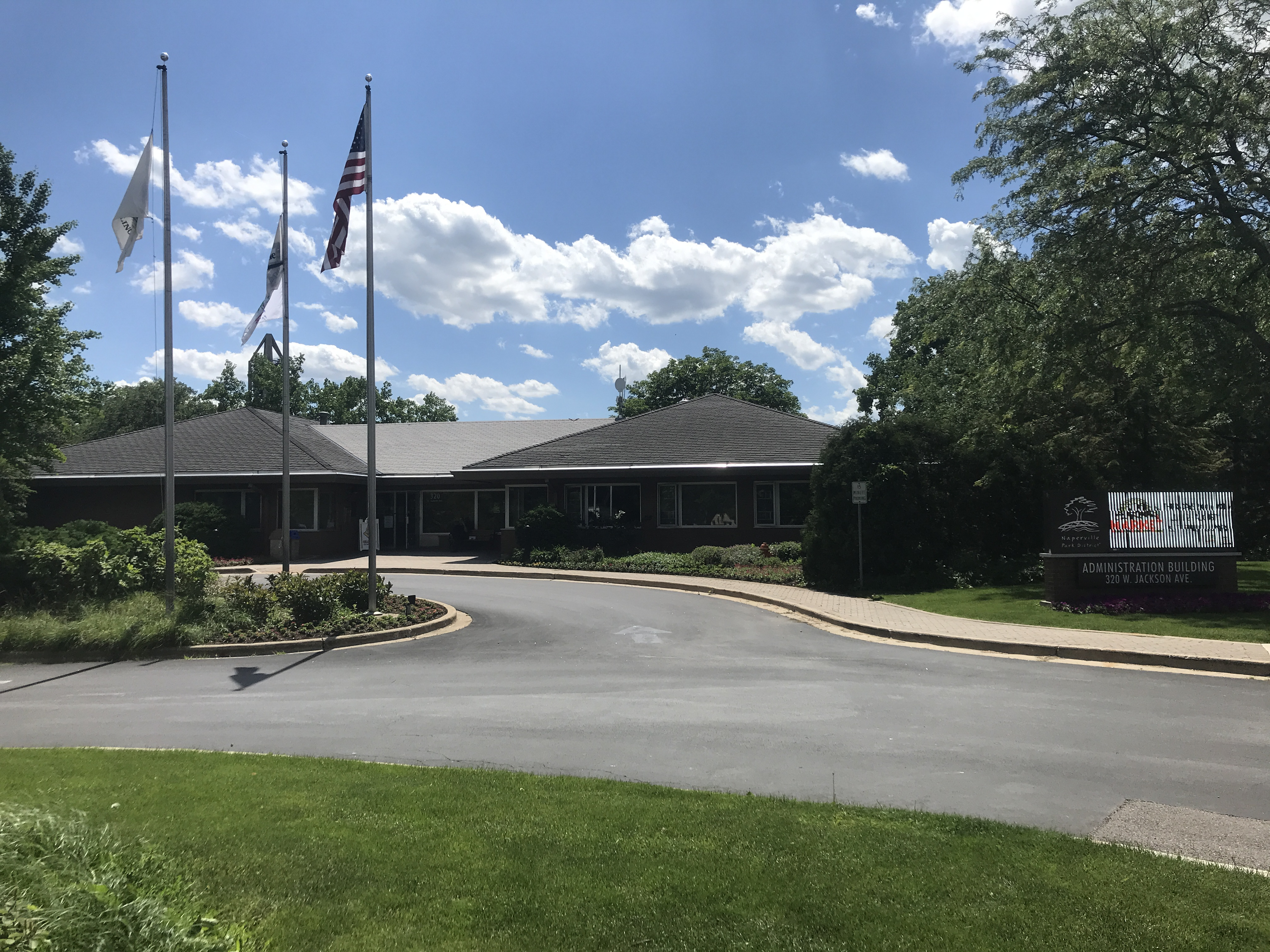
Naperville Park District Administrative Building

The Naperville Park District is an independent, special taxing district, providing parks and recreation to its residents that has been in operation since 1966. The Naperville Park District serves a population of more than 140,000. Its boundaries are mostly coterminous with the incorporated limits of the City of Naperville, Illinois, though there are small deviations, including the northern section of the White Eagle subdivision, which lies within the City of Aurora's boundaries.

The Naperville Park District owns and/or operates 139 parks, totaling over 2,500 acres (10 km^{2}). It serves about 60,000 participants each year through more than 900 recreational, arts, and environmental programs and events for all ages.

The District is governed by a seven-member Board of Commissioners, elected at-large by Naperville voters. As of the 2007 election, Commissioners were to begin serving four-year terms.

Naperville's park district has CAPRA accreditation from the National Recreation and Park Association, which is conferred to only 1% of park districts in the country. The park district won the National Gold Medal, awarded by the National Recreation and Park Association, in 1972. It was a finalist for the medal in 2002.
