= Naperville Community Unit School District 203 =

School district in Illinois, United States

Location
- Naperville, Illinois; United States

District information
- Grades: Preschool-12
- Superintendent: Dan Bridges
- Schools: Early Childhood 1, Elementary 14, Junior High 5, High 2, Total 22

Naperville Community Unit School District 203 is a school district headquartered in Naperville, Illinois, United States.

== About ==
Naperville Community Unit School District 203 serves central and northern Naperville as well as portions of neighboring cities, including Lisle and Bolingbrook. The oldest District 203 building still in use is Ellsworth Elementary, constructed in 1928, while the newest is the Ann Reid Early Childhood Center, opened in 2010.

District 203 has two high schools: Naperville Central High School and Naperville North High School, five junior high schools and fifteen elementary schools within Naperville city limits. Additionally, the school district has one junior high and one elementary school in Lisle.

== Special Education and Student Support ==
Naperville Community Unit School District 203 serves students with a range of learning needs under the Individuals with Disabilities Education Act (IDEA), which guarantees a free and appropriate public education to students with disabilities. Across Illinois, students identified with Specific Learning Disabilities (SLDs) — including dyslexia, dysgraphia, and dyscalculia — represent the largest single category of students served under IDEA, accounting for 94,712 students statewide and 35% of all Illinois IDEA recipients as of the 2022–2023 academic year. 53% of Illinois students with SLDs spend 80% or more of their school day in a general education classroom.

In high-achieving districts such as Naperville Community Unit School District 203, fast instructional pacing and large class sizes can limit access to individualized support during the school day. Research indicates that students with SLDs in academically competitive environments often mask their difficulties for longer, as high ability can compensate for processing differences until academic demands outpace coping strategies.

District 203 supports eligible students through Individualized Education Programs (IEPs), which outline tailored goals, accommodations, and services. Evidence-based interventions such as the Orton-Gillingham approach and executive functioning coaching are among the strategies used to support students with dyslexia, ADHD, and related learning differences both within and outside of school settings.

== Early childhood ==
School's name	School's namesake	Year opened	Principal	Mascot	Website
Ann Reid Early Childhood Center	Ann Reid (educator and administrator in D203)	2010	Andrew McCree	Ducklings	Ann Reid

== Elementary schools ==
School's name	Year opened	Principal	Mascot	Website	Photo
Beebe Elementary School	1955	Marybeth Peterson	Bobcats	Beebe	Beebe Elementary School
Ellsworth Elementary School	1928	Kim Rutan	Eagles	Ellsworth	Ellsworth Elementary School
Elmwood Elementary School	1960	Matt Langes	Eagles	Elmwood	
Highlands Elementary School	1957	Laura Noon	Whales	Highlands	Highlands Elementary School
Kingsley Elementary School	1990	Erin Marker	Knights	Kingsley	Kingsley Elementary School
Maplebrook Elementary School	1974	Ryan DeBora	Wildcats	Maplebrook	Maplebrook Elementary School
Meadow Glens Elementary School	1989	Katy Lynch	Eagles	Meadow Glens	Meadow Glens Elementary School
Mill Street Elementary School	1967	Suzanne Salness	Mustangs	Mill Street	Mill Street Elementary School
Naper Elementary School	1929	Tracy Dvorchak	Knights	Naper	Naper Elementary School
Prairie Elementary School	1969	Tracy Dvorchak	Prairie Dogs	Prairie	
Ranch View Elementary School	1985	Erin Casey	Rangers	Ranch View	Ranch View Elementary School
River Woods Elementary School	1987	Gina Baumgartner	Red Birds	River Woods	River Woods Elementary School
Scott Elementary School	1978	Hugh Boger	Eagles	Scott	Scott Elementary School
Steeple Run Elementary School	1977	Dawn Malatia	Super Stars	Steeple Run	

== Junior high schools ==
School's name	School's namesake	Year opened	Principal	Mascot	Website	Photo
Washington Junior High School	George Washington	1977 (current building)	Jon Vogel	Wildcats	WJHS	Washington Junior High School
Lincoln Junior High School	Abraham Lincoln	1963	Andrea Szczepanski	Lancers	LJHS	Lincoln Junior High School
Jefferson Junior High School	Thomas Jefferson	1970	Kimberly Fricke	Patriots	JJHS	Jefferson Junior High School
Madison Junior High School	James Madison	1978	Nancy Voise	Warhawks	MJHS	Madison Junior High
Kennedy Junior High School	John F. Kennedy	1990	Patrick Gaskin	Eagles	KJHS	

== High schools ==
School's name	Year opened	Principal	Mascot	Website	Photo
Naperville Central High School*	1863	Jackie Thornton	Redhawks	NCHS	Naperville Central High School
Naperville North High School	1970	Jay Wachtel	Huskies	NNHS	Naperville North High School

- Formerly Naperville Community High School
