= Edward Hospital =

Edward Hospital - Main Campus
- Endeavor Health

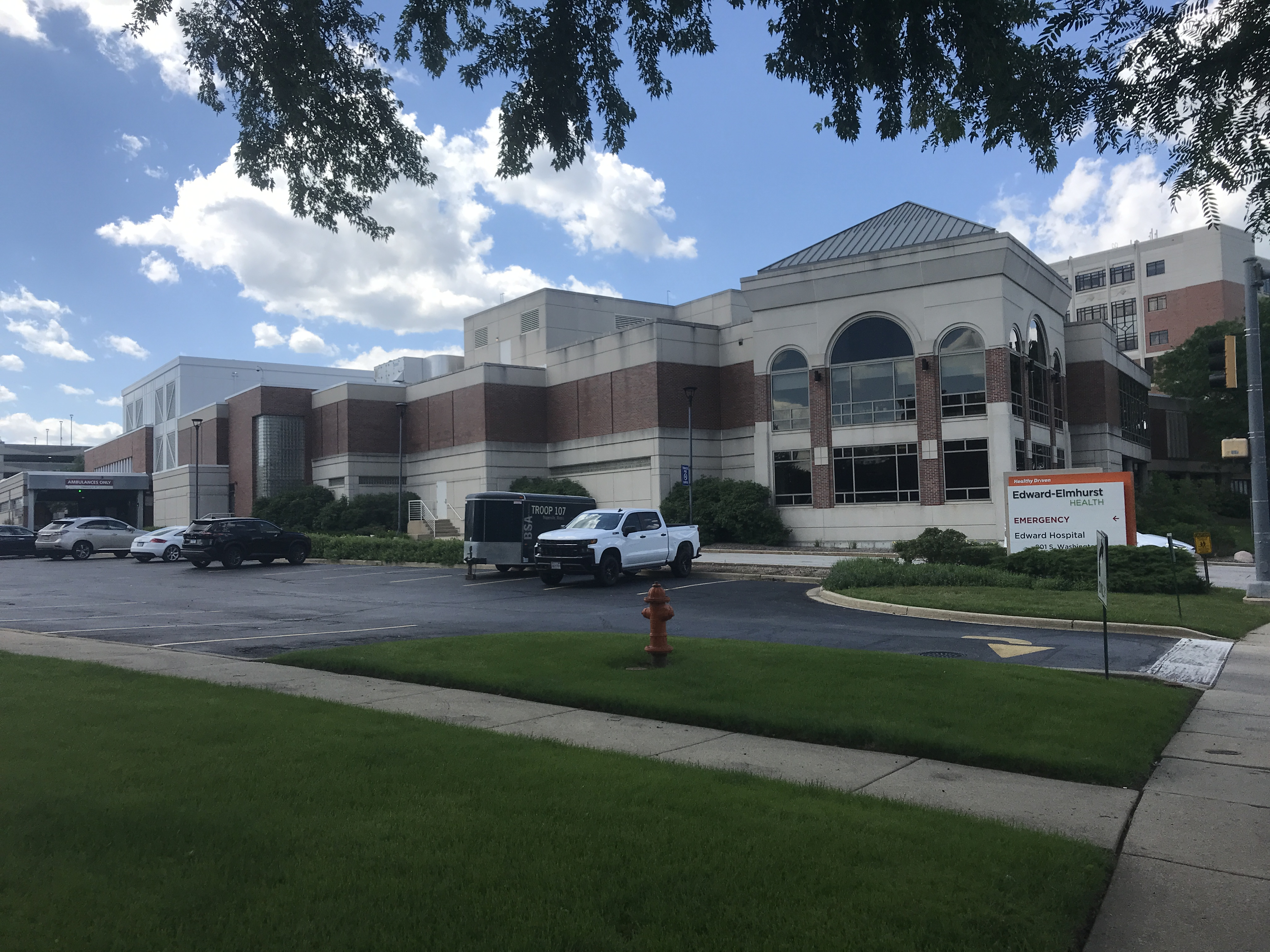
- View of Edward Hospital main building

Geography
- Location: 801 South Washington Street, Naperville, Illinois, United States
- Coordinates: 41°45′40″N 88°08′59″W

Organization
- Care system: 60+ medical/surgical specialties and subspecialties
- Type: General
- Affiliated university: None
- Patron: Edward Foundation

Services
- Emergency department: Level II trauma center
- Beds: 309

History
- Founded: 1907; 119 years ago (as Edward Sanitorium); 1955 (as Edward Hospital)

Links
- Website: www.endeavorhealth.org/locations/edward-hospital
- Lists: Hospitals in Illinois

Edward Hospital is a community hospital in southwest suburban Naperville, DuPage County, Illinois. Edward Hospital serves Chicago's west and southwest suburbs. The main campus is located at 801 S. Washington Street, Naperville, IL.

== History ==
Sleeping shack at Edward's Sanatorium, from a 1908 publication

In 1907, Edward Sanitorium was founded by Eudora Hull Spalding as a tuberculosis treatment center in memory of her husband Edward Gaylord, who died of tuberculosis. The main building was destroyed in a fire in 1920 and was later rebuilt. The sanitorium was renamed as Edward Hospital following its donation to the City of Naperville in 1955. The hospital became a public entity through the creation of the Edward Hospital District in 1959, and Eugene Morris was named the president. Edward Hospital became a private corporation in 1984, and the remains of the Edward Hospital District were dissolved in 2000. Pamela Meyer Davis became the hospital's president in 1988. During her tenure, Edward Hospital became the Edward Health Services Corporation and then Edward Hospital & Health Services. Bill Kottman took over her role in 2017.

In 2013, Edward Hospital merged with Elmhurst Memorial Hospital to create a new healthcare system called Edward-Elmhurst Health. In 2022, Edward-Elmhurst and NorthShore University HealthSystem merged to form Endeavor Health, creating the third-largest health system in Illinois, with 9 hospitals.

As of 2016, Edward Hospital has 354 private patient rooms and 7,700 employees, including 1,340 nurses and more than 1,900 physicians, across nearly 100 medical and surgical specialties and subspecialties. Ninety-eight percent of Edward's physicians are board certified.

In 2018, Edward-Elmhurst Health announced that it had overestimated its revenues by $92 million over several years. After revealing the error, CEO Mary Lou Mastro stated that the hospital system had made corrections to its accounting systems.

Edward Hospital was ranked the #8 hospital in Illinois and in the Chicago region by U.S. News & World Report in their 2021 Best Hospitals rankings.

== Locations ==
- Edward Healthcare Center, Bolingbrook
- Edward-Elmhurst Health Center, Lombard
- Edward Medical Group, Bolingbrook
- Edward Medical Group, Crest Hill
- Edward Medical Group, Lisle
- Naperville Campus
  - Edward Hospital
  - Heart Hospital
  - Edward Health & Fitness Center
  - Cancer Center
  - Diabetes Center
  - Edward Medical Group
  - Linden Oaks Hospital at Edward
- Naperville Off-Campus
  - Linden Oaks
  - Edward Healthcare Center
  - Edward Medical Group, 95th St.
  - Edward Medical Group, Hobson Road
  - Woman's Imaging Center
  - The Center for Surgery
- Edward Healthcare Center, Oswego
- Edward Medical Group, Oswego
- Plainfield Campus
  - Plainfield Outpatient Center
  - Plainfield Surgery Center
  - Edward Medical Group
- Plainfield Off-Campus
  - Edward Healthcare Center
  - Edward Medical Group
- Edward Medical Group, Sandwich
- Edward Sleep Center, Warrenville
- Edward Health & Fitness Center (Seven Bridges)
- Edward Healthcare Center, Yorkville
- Edward Medical Group, Yorkville, IL 60560)

== General References ==
"Cardiovascular Benchmarks". June 12, 2009. Archived from the original on May 29, 2009.

ABC7. "Whistle-blower helped bring down gov". ABC7 Chicago.

"Magnet Recognition Program". June 12, 2009. Archived from the original on July 9, 2010.
