= DuPage River =

River in Illinois, United States

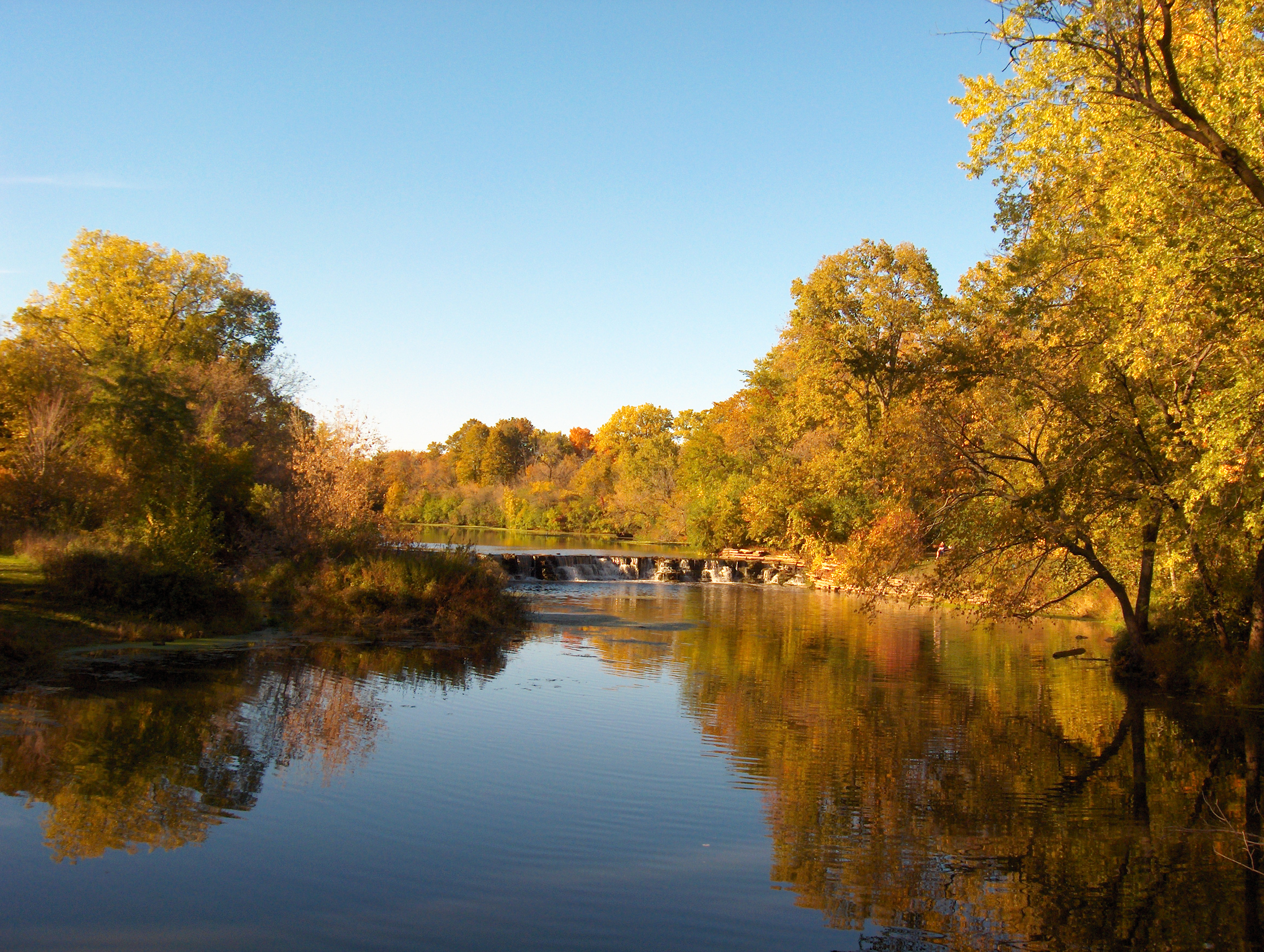
- Warrenville Grove Forest Preserve on the West Branch of the DuPage River, where Julius Warren claimed land in Warrenville in 1833.

Physical characteristics
- Source
  - location: Confluence of the East Branch and West Branch in Bolingbrook, Illinois
  - coordinates: 41°42′07″N 88°08′51″W
- Mouth
  - location: Confluence with the Des Plaines River near Channahon, Illinois
  - coordinates: 41°24′56″N 88°13′10″W
  - elevation: 502 ft (153 m)
- Length: 28.3 mi (45.5 km)
- Discharge
  - location: Shorewood, Illinois
  - average: 348 cu/ft. per sec.

Basin features
- Progression: DuPage River → Des Plaines → Illinois → Mississippi → Gulf Mexico
- GNIS ID: 407441

The DuPage River is a 28.3-mile-long (45.5 km) tributary of the Des Plaines River in the U.S. state of Illinois.

== Course ==
The river begins as two individual streams. The West Branch of the DuPage River, 35.0 miles (56.3 km) long, starts at Campanelli Park in Schaumburg within Cook County and continues southward through the entire county of DuPage, including the towns of Bartlett, Wayne, West Chicago, Wheaton, Warrenville, Winfield and Naperville (including through its riverwalk), as well as McDowell Grove. The East Branch of the DuPage River, 25.0 miles (40.2 km) long, begins in Bloomingdale and flows southward through Glendale Heights, Glen Ellyn, Lisle, Woodridge, parts of Naperville and parts of Bolingbrook. St. Joseph Creek, a tributary of the river's East Branch, runs through the small town of Belmont and onward into Downers Grove. The two branches meet at the southern end of Knoch Knolls Park, between Naperville and Bolingbrook. The combined DuPage River continues southward from that point, through Plainfield & Shorewood and then west of Joliet. Farther downstream, at Channahon, a dam on the river was originally constructed to raise the DuPage River water level to feed the Illinois and Michigan Canal. From Channahon, the river finally meets the Des Plaines River.

== Flooding ==
Like many local bodies of water, both branches of the DuPage River seriously overflowed after the "Flood of 1996", when approximately 17 inches (430 mm) of rain fell on the area within a 24-hour period, on July 17–18 of that year. Other flooding was also very common, along Washington Street in Naperville and Illinois Route 53 in Glen Ellyn, because those roads are close to their respective branches of the river, and along the river in Plainfield. The City of Naperville has torn down many of the affected homes and businesses, in the former case, and DuPage County, with U.S. Department of Transportation funding, tore down many of the affected homes in the latter case.

== History ==
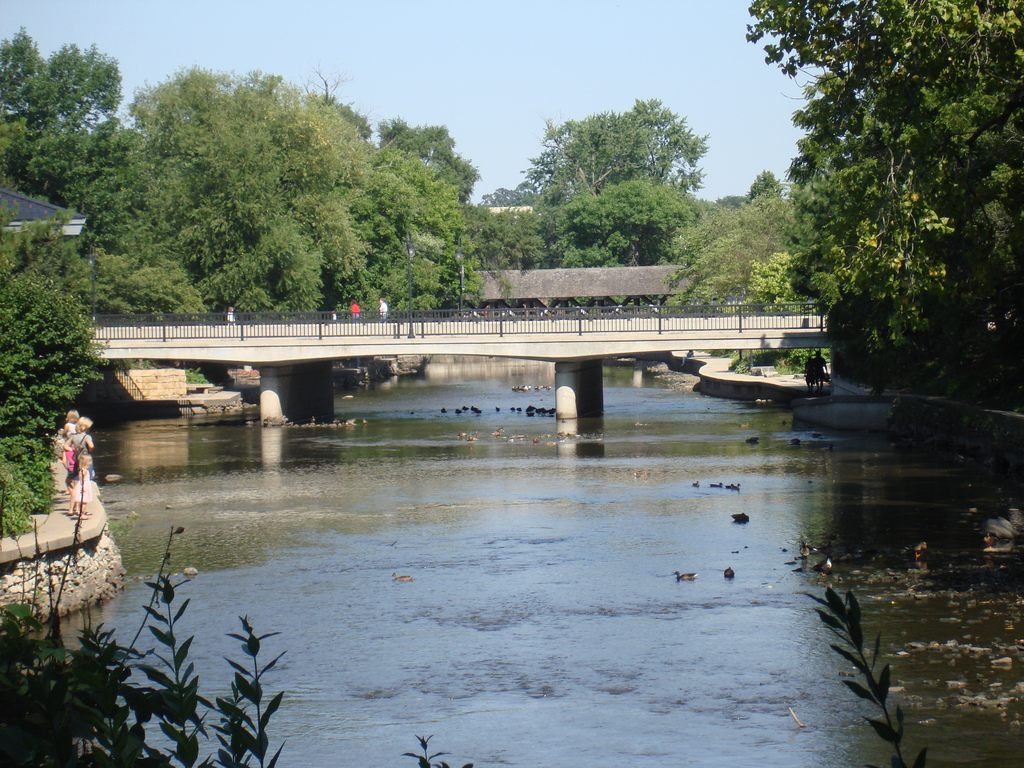
The West Branch of the DuPage River in Naperville.

The first written history to address the name, the 1882 History of DuPage County, Illinois, relates that:

The Du Page River had, from time immemorial, been a stream well known. It took its name from a French trader who settled on this stream below the fork previous to 1800. Hon. H. W. Blodgett, of Waukegan, informs the writer that J. B. Beaubien had often spoken to him of the old Frenchman, Du Page, whose station was on the bank of the river, down toward its mouth, and stated that the river took its name from him. The county name must have the same origin. Col Gurden S. Hubbard, who came into the country in 1818, informs the writer that the name DuPage, as applied to the river then, was universally known, but the trader for whom it was named lived there before his time. Mr. Beaubien says it is pronounced Du Pazhe (a having the sound of ah, and that the P should be a capital). This was in reply to Mr. Blodgett’s inquiry of him concerning the matter.

On the 1825 Henry S. Tanner map of Illinois and Missouri, Du Page River is listed as the "Du Page or Saukeyuck River".

== See also ==
- List of rivers of Illinois
