= Melchert =

Melchert is a surname. Notable people with the surname include:

- Catherine J. Melchert, mayor of Bartlett, Illinois from 1993 to 2009
- Christopher Melchert, American professor and scholar of Islam
- Craig Melchert (born 1945), American linguist
- Jim Melchert (1930–2023), American visual artist
- Norman Melchert (born 1933), American philosopher and author
- Sven Melchert, German astronomer
