= Streamwood High School =

Location
- 701 West Schaumburg Road; Streamwood, Illinois 60107; United States; 42.03023°N 88.19754°W

Information
- Type: Public secondary
- Motto: Strive, Honor, Succeed
- Established: 1978
- School district: Elgin School District U-46
- Principal: Luis Fernando De León
- Teaching staff: 118.40 (FTE)
- Grades: 9–12
- Enrollment: 1,594 (2024–2025)
- Student to teacher ratio: 16.44
- Campus: Suburban
- Colors: Black; Gold
- Athletics conference: Upstate Eight
- Mascot: Sabre
- Website: shs.u-46.org

Streamwood High School, or SHS, is a public four-year high school located in Streamwood, Illinois, a northwest suburb of Chicago, in the United States. It is part of Elgin Area School District U46's high school network, which also includes Bartlett High School, Larkin High School, South Elgin High School, and Elgin High School. It is also the home of the Leadership, Entrepreneurship, Action, and Design (LEAD) Academy.

== Academics ==
In 2017, Streamwood High School had an average composite ACT score of 20.

== Student demographics ==
In 2025:
15.4% White
8.2% Black
66.4% Hispanic
5.8% Asian
1.4% Native American
2.8% Multi-Racial

== Athletics ==
Streamwood competes in the Upstate Eight Conference. Streamwood High School's mascot is the Sabre (sword).

== Notable alumni ==
- Matt Ulrich, Class of 2000; retired NFL offensive lineman; member of the Super Bowl XLI champion Indianapolis Colts
- Christine Sherrill, Broadway musical theatre performer
