= Upstate Eight Conference =

High school sports conference in Illinois, U.S.

- Conference: IHSA
- Founded: 1963
- Sports fielded: 25 (13 boys, 12 girls)
- Division: West (larger) & East (smaller)
- No. of teams: 14
- Region: Chicago area, Illinois (DuPage, Cook, Kane counties)

The Upstate Eight Conference (UEC, U8C, or Upstate 8) is an organization of fourteen high schools in northeastern Illinois, representing ten communities in Chicago's suburbs. These high schools are all members of the Illinois High School Association.

The high schools of the Upstate Eight Conference are located in Kane County, Cook County, and DuPage County. Originally, the conference had eight member schools, but over time the membership has varied from six to as many as sixteen schools without any change of name.

== History ==
Formed in 1963 its charter members were DeKalb High School, East Aurora High School, Elgin High School, Larkin High School, Glenbard East High School, Naperville Community, West Aurora High School and Wheaton Community high schools. That next year Wheaton Community was renamed Wheaton Central when the district split. In 1965 Glenbard East left to join the Des Plaines Valley League and was replaced by St. Charles High School. Naperville Community and Wheaton Central left in 1975 to join the newly formed DuPage Valley Conference. Lake Park High School and newly opened Streamwood High School were added in 1979, which led to a stable lineup for the next 12 years.

Waubonsie Valley High School, located in Aurora, joined in 1991. West Aurora High School left in 1997 to join the DuPage Valley Conference. Newly opened schools Bartlett High School and Neuqua Valley High School located in Naperville joined in 1998. St. Charles High School split into St. Charles East and St. Charles North in 2000, with St. Charles North joining in 2001. South Elgin High School joined upon opening in 2005, preemptively taking DeKalb's place, as they left in 2006. Batavia High School and Geneva High School joined in 2010 following the dissolution of the Western Sun Conference, and joined newly opened Metea Valley High School in Aurora to bring conference membership to 14 schools. Lake Park left the conference to join the DuPage Valley Conference for the 2013–2014 season and was replaced by West Chicago. Glenbard East High School and West Aurora High School will return to the Upstate Eight Conference for the 2014-2015 athletic season, leaving the DuPage Valley Conference. For the 2015-2016 athletic season, Metea Valley High School, Neuqua Valley High School, and Waubonsie Valley High School leave the Upstate Eight conference for the DuPage Valley Conference. Starting in the 2018–2019 school year, St. Charles North, St. Charles East, Batavia, and Geneva will leave for the newly formed DuKane Conference along with Wheaton North, Wheaton Warrenville South, Glenbard North, and Lake Park from the DuPage Valley Conference while new member, Glenbard South High School joins in and the River and Valley Divisions became eliminated.

In 2019–20 school year, Fenton will replace West Aurora when accepting to leave the conference for the Southwest Prairie Conference.

In the year of 2024–25, three former Metro Suburban Conference, Ridgewood, Elmwood Park and Riverside-Brookfield and West Aurora High School have joined the conference.

== Membership ==
=== West ===
School	Town	Team Name	Colors	IHSA Classification	Reference
Bartlett High School	Bartlett	Hawks		3A/4A	
East Aurora High School	Aurora	Tomcats		3A/4A	
Elgin High School	Elgin	Maroons		3A/4A	
Larkin High School	Elgin	Royals		3A/4A	
South Elgin High School	South Elgin	Storm		3A/4A	
Streamwood High School	Streamwood	Sabres		3A/4A	
West Aurora High School	Aurora	Blackhawks		3A/4A	

=== East ===
School	Town	Team Name	Colors	IHSA Classification	Reference
Elmwood Park High School	Elmwood Park	Tigers		2A/3A	
Fenton High School	Bensenville	Bison		2A/3A	
Glenbard East High School	Lombard	Rams		3A/4A	
Glenbard South High School	Glen Ellyn	Raiders		2A/3A	
Ridgewood High School	Norridge	Rebels		2A/3A	
Riverside-Brookfield High School	Riverside	Bulldogs		3A/4A	
West Chicago High School	West Chicago	Wildcats		3A/4A	

=== Former members ===
School	Town	Team Name	Years in conference
DeKalb High School	DeKalb	Barbs	1963—2006
Lake Park High School	Roselle	Lancers	1979—2013
Metea Valley High School	Aurora	Mustangs	2010—2015
Naperville Community High School*	Naperville	Redskins	1963—1975
Neuqua Valley High School	Naperville	Wildcats	1998—2015
Waubonsie Valley High School	Aurora	Warriors	1991—2015
Wheaton Central High School**	Wheaton	Tigers	1963—1975
St. Charles High School***	St. Charles	Fighting Saints	1965—2018
St. Charles North High School	St. Charles	North Stars	2001—2018
Batavia High School	Batavia	Bulldogs	2010—2018
Geneva High School	Geneva	Vikings	2010—2018

* Naperville Community HS split into Naperville Central HS and Naperville North HS (which had no connection with the conference) in 1970.
** School renamed Wheaton Warrenville South HS in 1992.
*** In 2000, St. Charles HS renamed St. Charles East when St. Charles North opened in 2001.

== Sports ==
The conference currently oversees a total of 18 sports. Young men and women may compete in basketball, bowling, Dance, cheerleading, cross country, chess, esports, golf, gymnastics, soccer, swimming & diving, tennis, track & field, speech, and volleyball. Young men may compete in baseball, football, and wrestling, while young women may compete in badminton and softball.
