= Poplar Creek Public Library District =

Public library system in Illinois, US

- 42°0′31.1″N 88°10′28.2″W
- Location: 1405 S Park Ave, Streamwood, Illinois
- Type: Public library
- Established: March 18, 1967
- Service area: Streamwood, Hanover Park, Elgin, Schaumburg, Bartlett
- Branches: 1

Collection
- Size: 172,843

Access and use
- Circulation: 268,306
- Population served: 66,306

Other information
- Director: Jose Maldonado
- Website: pclib.org

Poplar Creek Public Library District is a public library in Illinois, which serves residents of Streamwood, Hanover Park, Elgin, Schaumburg, and Bartlett. Created by a 1966 referendum in Streamwood, it currently has one main Streamwood facility and one Hanover Park branch. It serves 66,000 residents, though many of its towns are served only in-part by Poplar Creek, with other residents being patrons of the Schaumburg Township District Library, Gail Borden Public Library District, or the Bartlett Public Library District.

Poplar Creek Library became a United States Federal and State document depository in 1980. Its collection contains approximately 160,000 books and 19,000 other items. It is a member of the DuPage Library System.

In 2009, an expansion and renovation of the facility was designed by Lonn Frye and AJ Rosales of Frye Gillan Molinaro Architects. This expanded facility has been the recipient of a 2009 GE Edison Award of Merit, a 2010 AIA Chicago Design Excellence Award for Interior Architecture, and it was also awarded the title of #1 New Landmark Library in May 2011 by Library Journal Magazine.

The Sonya Crawshaw Branch Library in Hanover Park was completely renovated and expanded in 2013. Itasca, Illinois based Williams Architects was the architect for the project.
