= George H. Garrey =

American mining geologist and engineer (1875–1957)

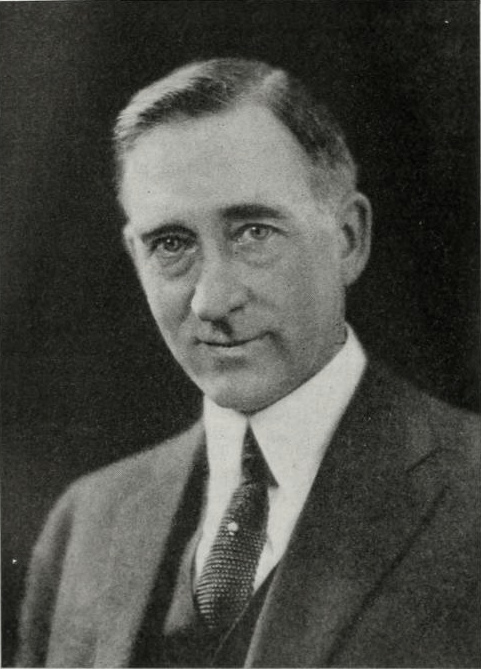
- Born: June 29, 1875; Reedsville, Wisconsin, U.S.
- Died: July 23, 1957 (aged 82); Denver, Colorado, U.S.
- Education: University of Chicago; Michigan College of Mines
- Occupations: Mining geologist; Mining engineer

George Henry Garrey (June 29, 1875 – July 23, 1957) was an American mining geologist and engineer.

Born in Reedsville, Wisconsin, to parents Harriet and John Garrey, George Garrey grew up in Stockbridge and Wausau before his family moved to Aurora, Illinois, where he graduated from West Aurora High School. He then entered the University of Chicago, where he played on the football and basketball teams for three years, and earned a bachelor's degree in 1900. From 1898 to 1900 he taught science at West Aurora High School, and in the summer of 1900, accompanied by Eliot Blackwelder, he worked with the United States Geological Survey (USGS) in western Montana, northern Idaho, and eastern Washington. This work was used as the basis for his master's degree in geology from the University of Chicago, conferred in 1902. Carrey was an assistant coach for the 1902 Chicago Maroons football team. In 1904 he received the degree in mining engineering from the Michigan College of Mines, and joined the USGS as an economic geologist to assist Josiah Edward Spurr.

In 1906 Garrey resigned from the USGS to act as first assistant to Spurr, who then held the position of chief geologist to the American Smelting and Refining Company (Asarco) and allied companies. In 1911 Garrey became chief geologist for Asarco, the American Smelters Securities Co., the Guggenheim Exploration Co., and the allied companies. As this involved examination of mines in Mexico at various periods of the Madero and Huerta revolutions, Garrey and the engineers who were assisting him underwent some trying times and upon two occasions had difficulty in getting out of Mexico. Early in 1914 he again opened an office as consulting mining geologist and engineer, and continued on this general consulting work until 1916, when he accepted the position of consulting geologist and engineer in charge of the exploration department of the Tonopah Belmont Development Co. This work involved the examination of numerous mining properties presented for purchase and also the outlining of development work for the company and its subsidiaries. He was a member of the Mining and Metallurgical Society of America, American Institute of Mining, Metallurgical, and Petroleum Engineers, Society of Economic Geologists, Washington Academy of Science, and the Geological Society of Washington.

Garrey married Anna Reynolds Morse in 1938, and died on July 23, 1957.
