= Matt Ulrich =

American football player (1981–2023)

No. 69
- Position: Offensive guard

Personal information
- Born: December 30, 1981; Streamwood, Illinois, U.S.
- Died: November 5, 2023 (aged 41); Gallatin Gateway, Montana, U.S.
- Listed height: 6 ft 4 in (1.93 m)
- Listed weight: 309 lb (140 kg)

Career information
- High school: Streamwood
- College: Northwestern
- NFL draft: 2005: undrafted

Career history
- Indianapolis Colts (2005–2006)

Awards and highlights
- Super Bowl champion (XLI)

Career NFL statistics
- Games played: 10
- Stats at Pro Football Reference

Matthew James Ulrich (December 30, 1981 – November 5, 2023) was an American professional football player who was an offensive guard for the Indianapolis Colts of the National Football League (NFL). He played college football for the Northwestern Wildcats. He won Super Bowl XLI with the Colts during the 2006 season over the Chicago Bears.

Ulrich was named Northwestern University team captain in 2004 and earned All-Big Ten Honorable Mention. He was named National Strength and Conditioning All-American in 2004 and still holds many Northwestern weight room records including squat (715), bench press (475), and incline press (425). Ulrich graduated in 2000 from Streamwood High School, where he won All-State and All-Midwest honors in football and also competed in the shot put. He was a three time Academic All-State in Illinois.

Ulrich was the co-founder of Dexa Fit, and was director of operations and sports performance at Winning Edge Athletics in Chicago. He was also a director with Profitable Ideas Exchange, where he led a team that convenes and facilitates peer-to-peer interactions of chief procurement officers, supply chain executives, chief marketing officers, chief tax officers and managing partners on behalf of a variety of clients including Accenture, KPMG, and Slalom Consulting.

Ulrich died on November 5, 2023, at the age of 41.
