= Batavia High School (Illinois) =

Secondary school in the United States

Location
- 1201 Main Street; Batavia, Illinois 60510; United States; 41.8483°N 88.3322°W

Information
- School type: Public, Secondary
- Established: 1911
- School district: Batavia Public School District 101
- Superintendent: Thomas Kim
- Principal: JoAnne Smith
- Teaching staff: 112.34 (FTE)
- Grades: 9–12
- Enrollment: 1,771 (2023–2024)
- Student to teacher ratio: 15.76
- Campus type: Suburban
- Colors: crimson gold
- Slogan: "Always Learning, Always Growing"
- Fight song: Illinois Loyalty (often referred to as 'Batavia Loyalty' )
- Athletics conference: DuKane Conference
- Mascot: Bulldog
- Team name: Bulldogs
- Rival: Geneva Community High School
- Newspaper: Spectator
- Yearbook: Echo
- Website: http://bhs.bps101.net

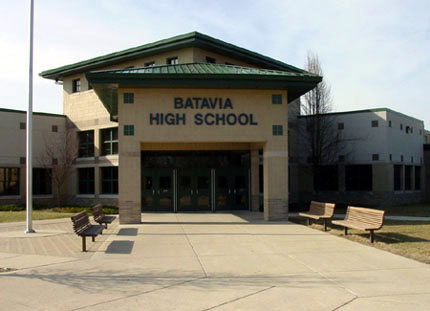

Batavia High School, or BHS, is a public four-year high school located in Batavia, Illinois, a western suburb of Chicago. It was created by the merger of West Batavia High School and East Batavia High School (and their separate school districts) in May 1911 and is part of Batavia Public School District 101; the East Batavia and West Batavia athletic programs merged in 1909. Since 2009, the school has added a new "D Wing" of classrooms, "E Wing" of music rooms, a fieldhouse, new athletic facilities, and an auditorium ("F Wing"), which was completed in 2011.

== Academics ==
Batavia High School has an average graduating class size of 400 and a graduation rate of 94%.

16 Advanced Placement (AP) courses are offered at BHS.

In 2022, BHS graduated 538 students. 61% of these graduates enrolled in a four-year college, 14% enrolled in a two-year college, 1% went directly to employment, 1% went into the military, and 25% had plans elsewhere.

80% of the class of 2022 had post-secondary experiences while still in high school through BHS, including AP and dual-credit classes, courses through Fox Valley Career Center, and a Waubonsee Community College manufacturing program.

== Fine arts ==
During the renovation between 2010, and 2011, there was a fine arts centre added to the school, known as the Batavia Fine Arts Centre, or BFAC for short. It is unclear how much was spent towards the BFAC but there was a $70 million dollar budget which was also spent towards remodeling in the school, and field house.

The theater itself has 890 seats, with a Mezzanine, Balcony, and Orchestra. There is a fly system, and booths dedicated for sound, and lighting. There is a projection system, two trap doors in the stage, and an orchestra shell. There is also three catwalks, and an hydraulic orchestra pit.

In addition to the main stage, there is a black box theater. The capacity is 90-135.

In 2023, the School Board approved the purchase of five Panasonic PTZ cameras. The equipment was installed in a Video Production classroom. According to the meeting documents, the equipment overall cost $51,491. There was $40,000 generated in DVD and Blu-ray sales during the pandemic. Later in the year, a full teleprompting system was purchased which included 3 teleprompters.

The BFAC is incredibly unique compared to other schools due to its modernization, whilst many school theater programs struggle with the proper funding. In 2026, the drama program musical is Hadestown:Teens Edition.

== Athletics ==
Batavia was a founding member of the Western Sun Conference (WSC), but joined the Upstate Eight Conference the following dissolution of the WSC in June 2010. In 2018–19, Batavia left the Upstate Eight to join the DuKane Conference. BHS is a full member of the Illinois High School Association. The school's mascot is a Bulldog and the team is often referred to as the "Battlin' Bulldogs."

=== Batavia vs. Geneva Rivalry ===
The school's biggest rival is Geneva High School, which is located in Geneva, a town directly to the north of Batavia. From 1913 to 2023, (with the exceptions of the years 1914, 1915, and 1918, and then in 1934, 1935, and 1936, when Batavia did not field a football team, as well as in 1996 when the two teams were in different divisions of their conference, and most recently in the year 2020 when the game was rescheduled for April 2, 2021 due to the COVID-19 pandemic), the Geneva Vikings and the Batavia Bulldogs have faced off on the football field 106 times. The current record as of 2025 is 52–50–5, favoring Geneva. The Batavia–Geneva game is among the twenty-oldest football rivalries in the state of Illinois.

=== Football ===
The 2011 season, the Bulldogs went 9–0 (first in school history). In 2006, the Batavia Varsity Football Team played in the Class 6A State Championship game at the University of Illinois' Memorial Stadium against Normal Community High School. They took second place. In 2013, the Bulldogs won the Class 6A State Championship game 34–14 over Richards High School of Oak Lawn. In 2017, the Bulldogs won the Class 7A State Championship game in Northern Illinois University' Huskie Stadium, beating Lake Zurich High School 20–14 in overtime.

=== Basketball ===
Batavia's first team dates to 1905–06. Batavia won its only state championship in 1912. Former Bulldogs hoopsters include Ken Anderson, Dan Issel, Dean Anderson, the late TNT sideline announcer, Craig Sager, and the late John Mauer.

=== Wrestling ===
Batavia started competing in wrestling in 1957 and currently has a boys' and girls' wrestling team. Tom Arlis is the current boys' head coach. Scott Bayer is the current girls' head coach.

==== Boys' wrestling ====
The boys' team won its first conference championship in the Little Seven during the 1979-1980 season as well as its first team state district championship. Batavia earned its first state medalist in 1981, with Steve Duvall securing fourth place. Batavia would have another state medalist that next year, where Ruben Cooper got fourth place. Matt Weight would win third in state in 1999, and second place in 2000. Later in the 2000s, the wrestling team would win the Suburban Prairie North conference consecutively from 2003-2005 and the Western Sun conference from 2007-2008. The boys' team were also state regional champions in the 2005-2006 season. Logan Arlis earned Batavia's second runner-up finish at the state level in 2009 and Danny Watson would win Batavia's second third-place finish that same year. The boys' team would win the Upstate Eight River Division conference championship in 2011 and 2014; and the Upstate Eight Tournament in 2015. In 2021, Mikey Caliendo won first place at state, becoming Batavia's first boys' wrestling state champion.

==== Girls' wrestling ====
In recent history, the Batavia girls' wrestling team has been competitive at the state level. Taylin Long won first place in 2019, becoming Batavia's first girls' wrestling state champion. She would later win second place in 2021. The girls' team would win the Dukane conference in 2023 and third place at state in 2024. Sydney Perry won first place consecutively from 2021-2024, becoming the only wrestler in Batavia's history to claim a state title in every year of their high school career.

=== Soccer ===
Batavia competes in the IHSA competition for both boys' and girls' soccer. Batavia soccer alumni include 1989 Collegiate Champion Mike Fisher.

=== Marching band ===
In 2009, the Marching Bulldogs began competing in various competitions around the state. In 2011, the Marching Bulldogs received new uniforms, switching from their traditional white pants and red jacket to an all-black uniform featuring a single red "B". In 2015, the band performed the show "Square the Circle" with music by jazz guitarist Pat Metheny. They placed in every competition including 3rd in class at the Illinois State competition and 7th overall in preliminaries and won multiple awards for best color guard, visuals, and percussion. In 2022, the band performed the show "When the Forest Calls" and placed 3rd overall for their class and won caption awards in all competitions they attended. The Marching Bulldogs made it to the Illinois State competition finals for the first time in school history placing 3rd in class 4A and placing 15th overall in the finals.

In 2023, the band performed the show entitled "The Crow" based on Swan Lake. The Marching Bulldogs placed either 1st or 2nd in their class at all competitions they attended as well as making it to Illinois State competition finals for the second time in school history placing 2nd place in class 4A and 11th place in finals.

=== Competitive cheer team ===
The Batavia Cheer Team has competed in ICCA and IHSA competitions since their inception in the early 2000s. They qualified for the 2012 State Championship in Bloomington, Il. The team has fluctuated between the Large All Girl and Coed divisions.

=== Dance team ===
In 2013, both the JV and Varsity teams competed in the TDI Grand Championship competition. Varsity placed 1st in Pom, 2nd in lyrical, and 3rd in the hip-hop category. JV placed first in both the Pom and Jazz categories and was the overall grand championship for all JV teams. In 2015 the team competed in the UDA national championship in Orlando.

== Notable events ==
=== Bomb plot ===
On November 26, 2019, a BHS student was arrested and charged with 14 crimes, including attempted first-degree murder and terrorism, for allegedly plotting to bomb the school.

The FBI was tipped off on the case by a science supplies store on "suspicious purchases." With local authorities, they conducted a search of the student's home and discovered numerous chemicals, compounds, and laboratory equipment to make bombs. In his notebook, he allegedly planned a "Dies irae," Latin for "Day of Wrath," at BHS in which he would "detonate bombs in the high school’s restrooms, throw Molotov cocktails and a hand grenade down hallways and die in a suicide," according to prosecutors.

The student was later diagnosed with schizophrenia. An FBI social media check on him found "suspicious accounts that were suspected to be related to anti-Semitism/Nazi/Hitler."

The student's case was transferred to adult court and he was detained for months before pleading guilty. As part of the plea deal, he avoided potentially decades in prison but agreed to serve four years of probation and mental health treatment in a residency program.

=== Headlock incident ===
On October 25, 2022, a filmed video of a student of Batavia High School being restrained in the school's cafeteria by now-former staff member Joe A. Cortez went viral among students. Local Chicago news covered the story, and a school investigation followed suit.

=== Gun threat investigation ===
On September 24, 2026, at approximately 8:58 AM, the Batavia Police Department (BPD) received a report of a possible threat involving BHS. School staff advised that they had received a voicemail from an unidentified individual where they stated that they would bring a firearm to the school. The BPD determined that there was imminent danger, where police presence increased with no alteration of school schedule.

Several schools in the area have experienced similar "swatting" incidents in the recent days, all of which were a hoax.

== Music ==
There are approximately 500 students in the school involved in music, with 13 curricular ensembles and 8 extracurricular ensembles. This includes four concert bands, four concert orchestras, and five choral ensembles. Extracurricular groups include the two show choir groups Swingsingers (Coed) and Legacy (female only), the A cappella group Chromatics, a marching band, Troubadours, Madrigals, two big band ensembles, Chamber Orchestra, pep band, and more. Each spring, the school puts on a musical with a full pit orchestra. Some include 2011's "Beauty and the Beast", 2012's "9 to 5", 2017's "Rent", "The SpongeBob Musical", and most recently "42nd Street" in 2022.

Each year distinguished students of the music department participate in the Illinois Music Educators Association district IX and state honor music groups. In 2017 the highest level band, Wind Symphony, was accepted to perform at the University of Illinois Superstate concert band festival and also at the 2018 Illinois Music Education Conference (IMEC). As of 2022 the band has performed at the Superstate festival every year since, excluding 2020 due to its cancellation because of the COVID-19 pandemic; they have also been invited to perform at IMEC again in January 2023. Batavia High School was recognized as a Grammy Signature School Semifinalist in 2014, 2015, and 2016. In 2023, the Batavia High School Wind Symphony was invited to perform at the 2023 Illinois Music Educators Conference (IMEC).

== School layout ==
The school is divided into six wings, labeled A through F.

- A Wing: Contains mostly specialty classrooms, such as culinary arts, video production, and graphics arts classrooms; location of the gym and cafeteria.
- B Wing: Contains the library and administration offices.
- C Wing: Located on the east end of the building; covers two floors; contains most core classrooms, such as social studies, math, and world language classrooms, with some science and English classrooms.
- D Wing: Located on the north end of the building; covers two floors; and contains science, English, and art classrooms.
- E Wing: Located on the northwest part of the building; contains the chorus, orchestra, and band rooms, music offices, music storage rooms, and music practice rooms.
- F Wing: Located on the west end of the building, contains the Batavia Fine Arts Centre, field house, and gym storage rooms.

== Notable alumni ==
- Ken Anderson (born 1949), former NFL quarterback; 1981 NFL Most Valuable Player.
- William B. Downs (1899–1966), orthodontist who created first Cephalometric Analysis in the field of Orthodontics.
- Dan Issel (born 1948), professional basketball player, playing in the ABA (1970–76) and NBA (1976–85). He was elected to the Basketball Hall of Fame in 1993.
- John Mauer (1901–1978), college basketball head coach for University of Kentucky, Tennessee, Florida and Army.
- Craig Sager (1951–2016), sportscaster for TNT and TBS; born in Batavia and attended BHS.
