= Elgin High School (Illinois) =

Location
- 1200 Maroon Drive; Elgin, Illinois 60120; United States; 42.0267°N 88.2453°W

Information
- School type: public secondary
- Motto: Education for all
- Opened: 1869; 157 years ago
- School district: Elgin Area School District U46
- CEEB code: 141770
- Principal: Avelira Gonzalez
- Teaching staff: 149.35 (FTE)
- Grades: 9–12
- Gender: coed
- Enrollment: 2,576 (2024–2025)
- Student to teacher ratio: 17.25
- Campus type: suburban
- Colors: maroon cream
- Song: Alma Mater
- Fight song: Elgin High School Loyalty
- Athletics conference: Upstate 8
- Team name: Maroons
- Accreditation: North Central Association of Colleges and Schools
- Publication: The Mirror
- Yearbook: The Maroon
- Nobel laureates: Paul Flory (1974, Chemistry)
- Website: ehs.u-46.org/o/ehs

Elgin High School, or EHS, is a public four-year high school located in Elgin, Illinois, an American city 40 mi. (63.5 km) northwest of Chicago. It is part of Elgin Area School District U46, which also includes Bartlett High School, Larkin High School, South Elgin High School, and Streamwood High School.

== History ==
Elgin High School is one of the oldest public high schools in the state. Its first graduation ceremony was held in 1872 and its accreditation dates back to 1904. It was formerly housed on Gifford Street adjacent to Gifford Park in a building that now serves as the Dream Academy as well as the home for specialized student services. A modern addition houses the school district offices. A new campus was constructed on the eastern edge of Elgin adjacent to Poplar Creek, which is its present location. Elgin High was first established in 1869 in Illinois and has changed locations three times since then.

School colors are maroon and cream. There is no mascot currently. The nickname "The Maroons" refers to the color of the early football sweaters. In the early 1980s the student body chose a fictional character "Chief Mighty Maroon" to be the school mascot in attempt to have a physical representation of the nickname. Previously, for generations, there had been no mascot with the school nickname being "The Maroons" based on the school colors. The short lived mascot was dropped in the early 2000s due to its insensitive portrayal of Indigeous Peoples. As a replacement for a mascot each incoming freshmen class chooses a mascot and a class color to represent their year.

A full history of the school, 1869-1969, be found in Elgin High: A Centennial History and Record Book by E.C. Alft, available in the library of the Elgin History Museum.

== Academics ==
As of 2023-2024, Elgin is ranked 5354 nationally, 187 in Illinois High Schools, 160 in Chicago Metra Area High Schools, and 3rd in District U-46.

Elgin High School also holds one of District U-46's magnet academies, and of which Elgin High holds the Gifted and Talented Academy. This academy allows accepted students to participate in college and advance courses starting from Freshman year all the way to Senior year of high school. The academy helps the students to think expansionary by taking advanced coursework, which prepares them for college. Currently, Elgin High is an international IB course and nominated to be an AP course school in the future. Elgin High also offers (out of the 5 high schools in the district) vast and the most academic opportunities and choices.

== Demographics ==
As of 2018-2019, the EHS student body was 9.6% White, 6.2% Black, 75% Hispanic, .7% Native American, 5.4% Asian, and 2.4% other races. 75% of students were listed as low-income.

== Athletics and activities ==
Elgin competes in the Upstate Eight Conference.

The following teams have won their respective Illinois High School Association state championships:

2024 - Esports - Mario Kart 8 Deluxe

Elgin High School offers a variety of school activities and sports that students could participate in, with some being a tradition for over 150 years, since 1869.

Sports:

Wrestling Basketball Soccer Football Volleyball Softball Baseball Cheer/Dance Track Cross Country Bowling Lacrosse Etc.

Activities:

Esports Scholastic Bowl Tech Club Acapella Low-Keys Jazz Choir Model United Nations Black Student Union Science Olympiad Etc.

== Notable alumni ==
- Max Adler (1883), vice-president of Sears & Roebuck, benefactor of Adler Planetarium
- Ray Barnhart (1945), Texas politician
- Earl Britton (1922), National Football League fullback and punter
- Nina Burleigh (1978), journalist and best-selling author
- Jack Burmaster (1944), professional basketball player, coach, and broadcaster
- Harry Chamberlin (1905), U.S. Army brigadier general and Olympic medalist in equestrian events
- Gail Monroe Dack (1918), American physician and professor of microbiology
- DeLos F. DeTar (1938), chemist
- August W. Farwick (1921) football player, coach at University of Arizona
- Paul Flory (1927) polymer chemist, recipient of 1974 Nobel Prize
- Brandon Johnson (1994), mayor of Chicago, elected 2023
- Laurence Kaptain (1970), international performer and recording artist, dean of College of Music and Dramatic Arts at LSU
- William LeBaron (1900), producer of Cimarron, Academy Award-winning film
- Jack Meagher, college football coach for Rice and Auburn
- Douglas R. Mills (1926), University of Illinois athletic director and men's basketball coach
- Earl "Madman" Muntz, engineer, entrepreneur, marketing pioneer, television personality
- Lou North (1910), Major League Baseball pitcher
- Jane Peterson (1901), painter and artist
- Brian Oldfield (1963), Olympic shot putter and pop culture personality
- John Qualen (1920), actor
- Steve Rauschenberger (1974) state senator, 1993 to 2007
- Flynn Robinson (1959), NBA player
- James Roche (1923) president of General Motors
- Tom Shales (1962), television critic for The Washington Post, 1988 recipient of Pulitzer Prize for Criticism
- Rick Sund (1970), NBA executive
- Don Sunderlage (1947), All-Star player in NBA
- John Walker, (1974), producer of The Incredibles, Oscar-winning film
- Jeff Wilkins (1973), NBA player

== Notable staff ==
- Larry Nemmers is a former principal (1982–94). He notably served as an NFL official (1985–2007).
