= Exploration geology =

Exploration geology may refer to:

- Exploration geophysics, a branch of geophysics which uses surface methods to detect or infer geological structures
- Mineral exploration
- Mining geology
- Prospecting
