= West Aurora High School =

Location
- 1201 W. New York Street; Aurora, Illinois 60506; United States; 41°45′54″N 88°20′44″W

Information
- School type: Public, high school
- Motto: A Tradition of Excellence
- Opened: 1868; 158 years ago
- School district: West Aurora Public School District 129
- Superintendent: Dr. Michael Smith
- CEEB code: 140185
- Principal: Dr. Whitney Martino
- Teaching staff: 225.12 (FTE)
- Grades: 9–12
- Gender: Co-educational
- Enrollment: 3,641 (2024–2025)
- Average class size: 23.3
- Student to teacher ratio: 16.17
- Campus: Suburban
- Colours: Red; Blue
- Fight song: Roll On, You Blackhawks
- Athletics conference: Upstate Eight Conference
- Mascot: Chief Blackhawk
- Nickname: Blackhawks
- Accreditation: AdvancED
- Publication: Muses
- Newspaper: Red and Blue
- Yearbook: EOS
- Website: Official website

West Aurora High School, or WAHS, is a public four-year high school located in Aurora, Illinois. It is part of West Aurora Public School District 129. The school is also referred to as "West" and "West High".

== History ==
High school classes were first offered in 1867 at Stone School (now defunct). The first graduating class of five students had their commencement in 1870.

From 1905 until the 1950s the high school was located in a building on Blackhawk Avenue (so named after the school's athletics mascot). This same building (demolished in February 2015) was Benjamin Franklin Junior High School until the 1970s, when it was sold to Aurora Christian School, which used it as their school building until 2004. The current WAHS structure was built in the early 1950s, and was dedicated in 1953 as "West Side Senior High." From 1978 to 1981 the building was briefly known as the "West Aurora South Campus," when two buildings existed on Aurora's west side to house the high school population. The building formerly known as the "West Aurora North Campus" now houses the Illinois Mathematics and Science Academy.

The present building has had multiple additions and renovations, with the major additions occurring over four phases. The first added classrooms to an existing two-story classroom wing in the early 1960s. The largest addition, to the north and east sides of the building, added the auditorium, classroom space and other amenities in 1966–1967. This addition was responsible for the creation of the building's first two courtyard spaces. The 1997–1998 addition was constructed as a two–story wing on the south end of the building, giving it a new facade, and closing a portion of New York Street. This addition included a new library, a technology center, a new cafeteria, and additional classroom space. The most recent addition was completed in time for the 2004–2005 academic year. This included a new fieldhouse, a new single–story classroom wing on the northwest corner of the building, and a new choral rehearsal space.

West High is a diverse school, with several academic and athletic programs available.

== Academics ==
In 2008, West Aurora had an average composite ACT score of 19.3, and graduated 79.1% of its senior class. West Aurora has not made Adequate Yearly Progress (AYP) on the Prairie State Achievement Examination, a state test, which with the ACT, are the assessment tools used in Illinois to fulfill the federal No Child Left Behind Act. All four of the student subgroups at West Aurora failed to meet minimum expectations in reading and math, as did the school as a whole.

== Athletics ==
Prior to 1979, West Aurora competed in the Upstate Eight Conference. West Aurora moved to compete in the DuPage Valley Conference which governs most interscholastic sports and competitive activities in the state of Illinois.

Officially, Blackhawk serves as a symbol for the school. The Class of 1937 voted to use the name "Blackhawks", as the original High School building was built on Blackhawk Street in Aurora. A plaque in the West High gymnasium foyer commemorates the action taken by the Class of 1937:

"Chief Blackhawk with his tribe of Sac Indians once roamed these prairies of Northern Illinois, and for him Blackhawk Street was named. He was a fighter loyal to the interests of his people. It is proper, therefore, that we, the class of 1937, bestow upon our own warriors, the athletic teams of West High School, the name of the Blackhawks. May they ever maintain the highest ideals of courageous actions, loyalty, and sportsmanship."

The school sponsors interscholastic sports teams for young men and women in basketball, cross country, golf, soccer, swimming & diving, tennis, track & field, volleyball, and wrestling. Young men may compete in baseball, football, while young women may compete in badminton, bowling, cheerleading, softball, and flag football. While not sponsored by the IHSA, the Athletic Department also sponsors a poms team for young women.

The following teams have won their respective IHSA sponsored state tournament or meet:

- Basketball (boys): State Champions (1999–2000)
- Tennis (girls): State Champions (1996–97, 1997–98)
- Track & Field: State Champions (1905–06)

The rivalry between West and East Aurora High School is the second oldest in the state of Illinois.

The 1951 Girls' Golf season saw great controversy which nearly resulted in a cancellation of the season. The issue began when a member of the team refused to wear the required uniform, which consisted of a polo shirt with the West Aurora Blackhawks logo and a pleated, knee length skirt. The aforementioned team member arrived for the first tournament at the links wearing a pair of men's golf trousers, stating that if she had worn the required skirt, she would either have to sacrifice a full force swing or her modesty. Wanting to keep his player's femininity as well as their ability strike the ball 200 yards at the same time, the coach came up with the idea of dressing his girls in culottes. These split, pants-like skirts were designed to provide women more freedom to do activities such as gardening, cleaning, bike riding, etc. and still look like one is wearing a skirt.

== Music program ==
The West Aurora band program is a member of district nine in the Illinois Music Educators Association (IMEA). The Jazz Ensemble performed at the Chicago Jazz Festival on 1 September 2006, becoming only the second high school group ever invited to perform at the Festival. The band participated in festivities and performed at the 2006 Chick-fil-A Bowl.

== Notable alumni ==
- Marger Apsit (class of 1926), former NFL running back
- Kenny Battle (class of 1984), former NBA player
- Rich Becker (class of 1990), Major League Baseball outfielder (1993–2000)
- Lauren Carlini (class of 2013), volleyball player on the United States women's volleyball team
- Bob Carney, NBA player
- John Drury (class of 1945), Chicago news anchor (WGN, WLS)
- Andrea Evans (1967), actress
- Ruth VanSickle Ford (class of 1915), commercial illustrator and art teacher
- Bruce Franklin (class of 1979), guitarist for heavy metal band Trouble
- George H. Garrey, mining geologist and engineer
- Phillip E. Johnson (class of 1958), University of California-Berkeley law professor and founder of Intelligent design movement.
- Stana Katic (class of 1996), actress, star of television series Castle
- Preston Larrison, baseball player
- Lester Larson, collegiate football coach
- Don Laz, silver medalist pole vaulter at 1952 Olympics in Helsinki
- Jim Marzuki (class of 1943), Illinois state representative, teacher, and sculptor
- Izzy Martinez (class of 2001), wrestling coach and COO of Real American Freestyle
- Nicole Narain (did not graduate), actress, model, Playmate
- Richard Olson (class of 1947), politician
- Shaun Pruitt, professional basketball player
- Randy Shilts (class of 1969), journalist and author
- Jeffrey Skilling (class of 1971), CEO of Enron, convicted of crimes related to Enron scandal.
- Tom Skilling (class of 1970), meteorologist who works with WGN-TV and Chicago Tribune
- Billy Taylor, college basketball coach
