= Larkin High School =

Location
- 1475 Larkin Avenue; Elgin, Illinois 60123; United States; 42.0320°N 88.3136°W

Information
- School type: Public secondary
- Motto: Live, Love, Larkin Have A Royal Day
- Established: 1962
- School district: U46
- Principal: Jason Misicka
- Teaching staff: 144.10 (FTE)
- Grades: 9-12
- Enrollment: 2,274 (2023–2024)
- Average class size: 17.1
- Student to teacher ratio: 15.78
- Campus type: Suburban
- Colors: Cerulean blue, white
- Slogan: "We Are Royals"
- Athletics conference: Upstate Eight Conference
- Mascot: Royal
- Nickname: Royals
- Rival: Elgin High School Maroons
- Accreditation: AdvancED
- Newspaper: Cerulean Newspaper
- Yearbook: Cerulean Studios
- Feeder schools: Abbott Middle School; Kimball Middle School
- Website: lhs.u-46.org/o/lhs

Larkin High School (LHS) is a public four-year high school located in Elgin, Illinois, United States. It is part of Elgin Area School District U46, which also includes Elgin High School, Bartlett High School, South Elgin High School, and Streamwood High School.

== History ==
Larkin High School was built in 1962 on the former farm of Cyrus H. Larkin, after whom the school is named. Elgin citizens were divided on the naming of the new west side high school. Many voiced their opinion to the school board that naming it Elgin (West) HS would better rival the original Elgin HS located on the east side of the Fox River in the City of Elgin (thus Elgin East). The Larkin name ultimately prevailed.

The yearbook is named the Cerulean in honor of the school's colors: cerulean (a deep blue) and white.

== Academics ==
Larkin has not made Adequate Yearly Progress on the Prairie State Achievements Examination, a state test part of the No Child Left Behind Act. Larkin is listed as "Academic Watch Status Year 5." In 2010, the graduation rate was 78.8%.

Larkin is home to the district's Visual and Performing Arts Academy.

== Student demographics ==
In 2017, Larkin's students were 16.3% White, 9.2% Black, 67.4% Hispanic, 2.9% Asian, 0.8% Native American, and 3.4% multiracial.

18.9% of students were deemed limited-English-proficient (LEP), and 74.6% of students were low income.

The 2017 attendance rate was 87.2%. Total enrollment was 2,087. Average class size was 20 students.

== School athletics ==
Larkin High School is a member of the Upstate Eight Conference and has many athletic teams, including:

- Wrestling
- Softball
- Soccer
- Swimming
- Track & field
- Tennis
- Speech
- Volleyball
- Basketball
- Bowling
- Football
- Baseball
- Golf
- Badminton
- Cross country
- Cheerleading

== Activities ==
Larkin offers nearly 40 extracurricular activities, including academic, service, and performing arts. Larkin is home of the Visual and Performing Arts Academy. The Larkin High School Visual and Performing Arts Academy (VPAA) is a four-year program which offers specialized academic studies and activities in the areas of Art, Dance, Drama, and Vocal and Instrumental Music. With being a VPAA school, Larkin also has a theater tech club that runs the lighting and sound as well as set building for the shows in the auditorium. Other activities include HOSA.

== Notable alumni ==
- Rick Kehr (1977), NFL player
- David Otunga (1998), actor, lawyer, and professional wrestler
- Rick Short (1991), MLB player
- Roger Smithberg (1984), MLB player
