= Jim Marzuki =

American artist, educator, and politician

Jim Marzuki (June 22, 1925 – July 9, 2000) was an American artist, educator, and politician.

Marzuki was born in Aurora, Illinois and graduated from West Aurora High School in 1943. He served in the United States Navy during World War II. He received his bachelor's degree from Western Illinois University and his master's degrees from Governors State University and from University of New Mexico. Marzuki lived in Park Forest, Illinois with his wife and family and taught art and industrial arts at Rich East High School in Park Forest. Marzuki was also a sculptor. Marzuki served on the Park Forest Village Board and on the Park Forest Planning Commission. Marzuki served in the Illinois House of Representatives from 1983 to 1985 and was a Democrat. Marzuki died at St. James Hospital in Chicago Heights, Illinois from a stroke.
