= Batavia Public School District 101 =

Public school district in Batavia, Illinois, USA

Address
- 335 W. Wilson Street Batavia, Illinois, 60510; United States
- Coordinates: 41.850178°N 88.313832°W

District information
- Type: Public
- Motto: Always Learning, Always Growing
- Grades: PreK-12
- Established: 1911; 114 years ago
- Superintendent: Thomas Kim
- School board: Craig Meadows, Sue Locke, Aaron Killburg, RJ Mathis, Danielle Sligar, Rob Arulandu, Raquel Gonzalez-Thomas
- Schools: 8
- NCES District ID: 1705220

Students and staff
- Students: 5,184
- Faculty: 700
- Teachers: 353 (FTE)
- Student–teacher ratio: 17:1
- District mascot: Bulldog

Other information
- Website: bps101.net

Batavia Public School District 101 (BPS101) is a school district headquartered in Batavia, Illinois. The district is run by a superintendent and is overseen by a seven-member elected school board.

Batavia previously had two school districts serving western and eastern portions; they combined into BPS101 in 1911.

== Schools ==
Secondary

- Batavia High School
- Rotolo Middle School

Primary

- Alice Gustafson Elementary School and Early Childhood Center
- Hoover-Wood Elementary School
- Grace McWayne Elementary School
- J. B. Nelson Elementary School
- H. C. Storm Elementary School
- Louise White Elementary School

== Governance ==
A board made up of seven community members is elected every two years in alternating election years. The Board has a president and vice president and holds public meetings monthly. The Board oversees the District's finances and policy, and appoints a superintendent. The current Board president is Craig Meadows and current vice president is Aaron Kilburg. Tom Kim is the current BPS Superintendent.

List of superintendents
Superintendent	Years of Service
Hugh A. Bone	1911-1916
Howard C. Storm	1916-1938
John B. Nelson	1938-1962
Arthur V. Perry	1962-1970
William E. Dickson	1970-1974
James A. Clark	1974-1984
Stephanie Pace Marshall	1984-1986
Edward Cave	1986-2006
Jack K. Barshinger	2006-2013
Lisa Hichens	2013-2023
Tom Kim	2023-present

== Issues ==
=== Racism and bullying ===
In December 2021, students, parents, and teachers described experiences of racism and bullying they had faced in the District at a school Board meeting. A committee established by the Board confirmed that many marginalized students reported feeling unsafe at school in February 2022. On May 24, 2022, dozens of people rallied before a school Board meeting being held later that evening to call for the District to do more to help marginalized students in the District.
