= John Mauer =

American college basketball coach, baseball coach, football coach

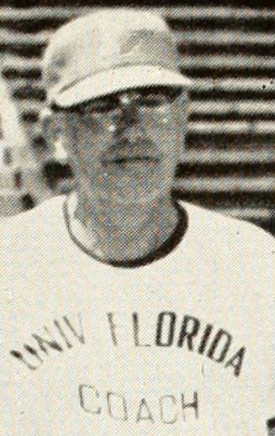
- Mauer, c. 1956

Biographical details
- Born: September 4, 1901; Aurora, Illinois, U.S.
- Died: December 20, 1978 (aged 77); Knoxville, Tennessee, U.S.

Playing career

Basketball
- 1922–1926: Illinois

Coaching career (HC unless noted)

Football
- 1926: Batavia HS (IL)
- 1938–1946: Tennessee (DB)
- 1951–1960: Florida (DB)
- 1960–1963: Tennessee (DB)

Basketball
- 1926–1927: Batavia HS (IL)
- 1927–1930: Kentucky
- 1930–1938: Miami (OH)
- 1938–1947: Tennessee
- 1947–1951: Army
- 1951–1960: Florida

Baseball
- 1938–1942: Tennessee

Head coaching record
- Overall: 344–272 (college basketball); 24–23 (college baseball)
- Tournaments: Basketball; 0–1 (NIT)

Accomplishments and honors

Championships
- Basketball: 2 SEC regular season (1941, 1943); 2 SEC tournament (1941, 1943); Football: National (1923)

John W. Mauer (September 4, 1901 – December 20, 1978) was an American college basketball, baseball and football coach and multi-sport college athlete. During the course of his 36-year collegiate coaching career, Mauer was the head basketball coach at the University of Kentucky, Miami University (Ohio), the University of Tennessee, the U.S. Military Academy, and the University of Florida. John was the head coach of the Tennessee baseball team. John also served as the defensive backs coach for Tennessee under head coaches General Robert Neyland, Bowden Wyatt, and Jim McDonald. After coaching his college coaching career, John worked under Vince Lombardi scouting players for the Green Bay Packers. Mauer also scouted for the San Francisco 49ers, Atlanta Falcons, and New York Giants.

== Early life and education ==
Mauer was born in 1901 at Aurora, Illinois. Both of his parents died by the time he was 13 years old, and he was raised by his older sister. With the financial assistance of a local businessman, he attended Batavia High School in Batavia, Illinois and was able to enroll in college.

Mauer attended the University of Illinois in Urbana, Illinois from 1922 to 1926, where he played for the Illinois Fighting Illini men's basketball team. As a player, he was remembered for being one of the pioneers of one-handed shooting. While attending Illinois, his roommate was Illini football great Harold E. "Red" Grange. Mauer was named Outstanding Athlete and Scholar in the Big Ten Conference as a senior, and graduated from Illinois with a bachelor's degree in 1926.

== Coaching career ==
Mauer was the head coach in football, basketball, and track at Batavia High School, from 1926 to 1927, after which he was the head coach of the Kentucky Wildcats men's basketball team of the University of Kentucky in Lexington, Kentucky from 1927 to 1930, immediately preceding the legendary Adolph Rupp. Mauer's successful Wildcats teams were known as the "Mauer men," and he was one of the first coaches to popularize the bounce pass as an element of basketball offense. His Wildcats teams posted an overall win–loss record of 40–14 (.741) in three seasons.

After leaving Kentucky, he became the head coach of the Miami Redskins men's basketball team of Miami University in Oxford, Ohio, coaching the Redskins (now known as the "RedHawks") for eight seasons from 1930 to 1938. Mauer did not have a winning record in his first five seasons with the Redskins, but posted winning records in two of his final three seasons. During the 1937–1938 season, the Redskins finished 11–5. At Miami, he coached Walter "Smoky" Alston who would go on manage the Brooklyn and Los Angeles Dodgers. He finished his Miami career with an overall record of 46–80 (.365), leaving Oxford after the 1937–1938 season, and was replaced by Weeb Ewbank.

Mauer became the head coach for the Tennessee Volunteers men's basketball team of the University of Tennessee in Knoxville, Tennessee, for eight seasons between 1938 and 1947. Mauer's Volunteers had significant success, posting an overall record of 127–41 (.756), and winning two Southeastern Conference (SEC) championships (1941, 1943) and two SEC tournaments (1941, 1943). In 1945, John led the team to the Quarterfinals in the National Invitation Tournament (NIT). At the time, the National Invitation Tournament was more prestigious than the NCAA basketball tournament.

During his time as the Volunteers' head basketball coach, he also worked as the head coach of the Tennessee Volunteers baseball team from 1938 to 1942, and as an assistant football coach for the Tennessee Volunteers football team under head coaches Neyland and John Barnhill from 1938 to 1946.

Mauer later served as the head coach for the Army Black Knights men's basketball team of the U.S. Military Academy in West Point, New York, for four seasons from 1947 to 1951, and the Florida Gators men's basketball team of the University of Florida in Gainesville, Florida, for nine seasons from 1951 to 1960. His four Army Cadets teams finished 33–35 (.485); his nine Gators teams compiled a record of 98–102 (.490). While coaching the Gators basketball team, he also served as an assistant coach for the Florida Gators football team under head coaches Bob Woodruff and Ray Graves.

After his final season as the Gators' basketball mentor, Mauer returned to the University of Tennessee and worked as an assistant coach for the Volunteers football team from 1960 to 1963 under head coaches Bowden Wyatt and Jim McDonald.

== Legacy ==
Mauer died in Knoxville on December 20, 1978; he was 77 years old. He was survived by his wife Grace, their two sons, and their five grandchildren.

Mauer was the first, and until Lane Kiffin in 2026 only, person to serve as the head coach in the same sport at three different SEC universities. His winning percentage as the Tennessee Volunteers men's basketball head coach remains the best of the modern era; his winning percentage as the Kentucky Wildcats' head is still among the program's six best of the modern era. Mauer was posthumously inducted into the Tennessee Sports Hall of Fame in 2002.

== Head coaching record ==
=== College basketball ===
Record table
Season	Team	Overall	Conference	Standing	Postseason
Kentucky Wildcats (Southern Conference) (1927–1930)
1927–28	Kentucky	12–6	8–1	T–3rd	
1928–29	Kentucky	12–5	7–4	T–6th	
1929–30	Kentucky	16–3	9–1	T–2nd	
Kentucky:		40–14	24–6		
Miami Redskins (Independent) (1930–1938)
1930–31	Miami (OH)	5–10			
1931–32	Miami (OH)	6–10			
1932–33	Miami (OH)	3–13			
1933–34	Miami (OH)	4–11			
1934–35	Miami (OH)	3–12			
1935–36	Miami (OH)	9–8			
1936–37	Miami (OH)	5–11			
1937–38	Miami (OH)	11–5			
Miami (OH):		46–80			
Tennessee Volunteers (Southeastern Conference) (1938–1947)
1938–39	Tennessee	14–7	6–5	8th	
1939–40	Tennessee	14–7	7–3	2nd	
1940–41	Tennessee	17–5	8–3	3rd	
1941–42	Tennessee	19–3	7–1	1st	
1942–43	Tennessee	14–4	6–3	3rd	
1944–45	Tennessee	18–5	8–2	T-1st	NIT Quarterfinal
1945–46	Tennessee	15–5	8–3	3rd	
1946–47	Tennessee	16–5	10–3	3rd	
Tennessee:		127–41	60–23		
Army Cadets (Independent) (1947–1951)
1947–48	Army	8–9			
1948–49	Army	7–10			
1949–50	Army	9–8			
1950–51	Army	9–8			
Army:		33–35			
Florida Gators (Southeastern Conference) (1951–1960)
1951–52	Florida	15–9	7–7	7th	
1952–53	Florida	13–6	8–5	3rd	
1953–54	Florida	7–15	3–11	10th	
1954–55	Florida	12–10	5–9	9th	
1955–56	Florida	11–12	4–10	11th	
1956–57	Florida	14–10	6–8	9th	
1957–58	Florida	12–9	5–9	9th	
1958–59	Florida	8–15	2–12	11th	
1959–60	Florida	6–16	3–11	11th	
Florida:		98–102	43–82		
Total:		344–272			
National champion Postseason invitational champion Conference regular season champion Conference regular season and conference tournament champion Division regular season champion Division regular season and conference tournament champion Conference tournament champion

== See also ==
- Army Black Knights
- Florida Gators
- History of the University of Florida
- Illinois Fighting Illini
- Kentucky Wildcats
- List of University of Illinois people
- Miami Redhawks
- Tennessee Volunteers
- University Athletic Association
