= BAPS Shri Swaminarayan Mandir Chicago =

BAPS Shri Swaminarayan Mandir
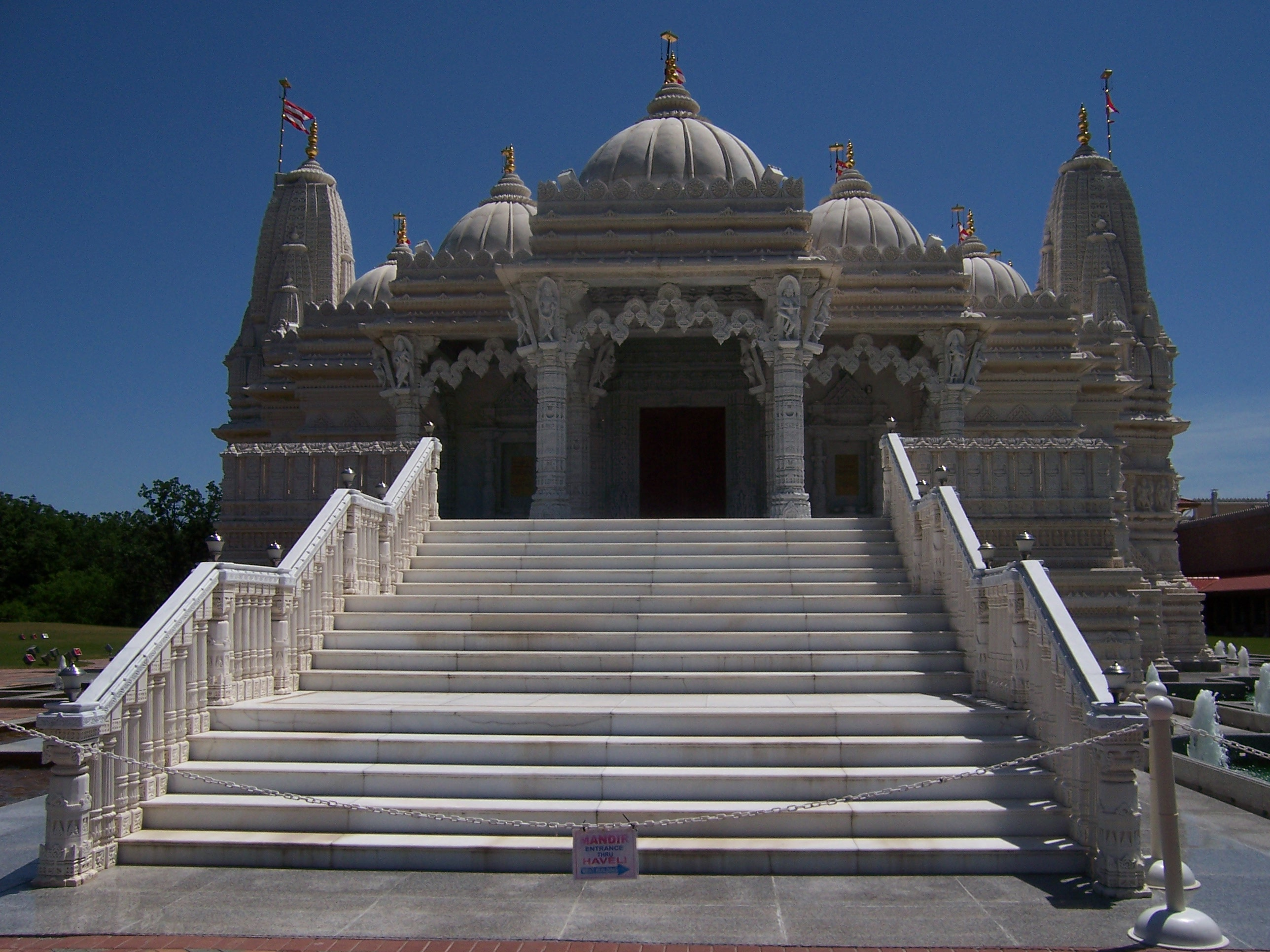

Religion
- Affiliation: Hinduism
- Deity: Swaminarayan, Radha Krishna, Rama-Sita, Shiva-Parvati

Location
- Location: Bartlett, Illinois
- State: Illinois
- Country: United States
- Interactive map of BAPS Shri Swaminarayan Mandir

Architecture
- Type: Shilpa Shastras
- Creator: Pramukh Swami Maharaj / BAPS
- Completed: August 2004 (consecrated)

Website
- chicago.baps.org

The BAPS Shri Swaminarayan Mandir of Chicago, Illinois is a traditional Hindu place of worship built by the BAPS Swaminarayan Sanstha. The BAPS Swaminarayan Sanstha, which is headed by Mahant Swami Maharaj, is a denomination of the Swaminarayan Sampradaya within Hinduism. The mandir is located in the Chicago suburb of Bartlett and opened on August 7, 2004. It was built of hand-carved Italian marble and Turkish limestone. The mandir is the largest of its kind in Illinois and was constructed in accordance to the Shilpa shastras. The mandir complex spreads over 27 acres and includes the mandir and the haveli.

== Daily rituals ==
The central shrine of the mandir houses the murti of Swaminarayan, with Gunatitanand Swami to his left, together worshipped as Akshar-Purushottam Maharaj. Other shrines hold the murtis of Ghanshyam Maharaj, Harikrishna Maharaj, Radha-Krishna, Shiva-Parvati, Sita-Ram, Hanumana, Ganesh, and the lineage of BAPS gurus who are Swaminarayan's spiritual successors in BAPS. The Swaminarayan swamis offer devotional worship by performing the aarti ritual five times throughout the day and offering food to the deities.

Aarti is a ritual where devotees sing the glory of God while a lighted wick is circulated before the murtis. Food that has been offered to the deities is considered sanctified, and is distributed to devotees as holy prasadam. Shrine doors are closed when food is being offered and when the murtis are put to rest.

== Mandir activities ==
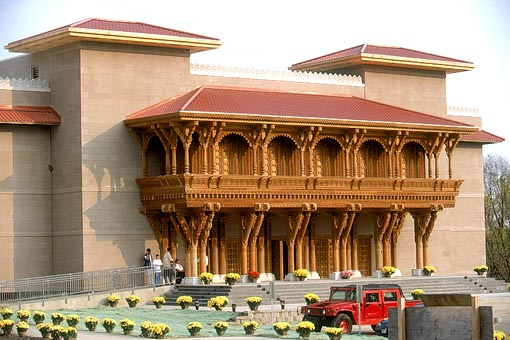
BAPS Shri Swaminarayan Haveli, Chicago

Followers gather for weekly assemblies in the haveli where devotional hymns are sung and discourses on Hindu scriptures are conducted. The temple also organizes activities for the youth, such as Hinduism classes, traditional Indian music classes, Gujarati classes, leadership seminars, and charitable initiatives.

Some of the major festivals celebrated annually include Rama Navami, Krishna Janmashtami, Maha Shivaratri, Holi, Ganesh Chaturthi, and Diwali. Diwali is one of the grandest Hindu festivals observed in the temple, an occasion that attracts many visitors and devotees.

=== Tours ===
Tours of the temple can be scheduled for individuals, groups, and educational institutions. Group visits are available on weekends and holidays and can be scheduled from 10AM to 5PM Monday to Saturday, and before 12PM on Sunday. Tours can be scheduled through the temple's website.

== History ==
In 1972, at the behest of Pramukh Swami Maharaj, a small group of devotees in Chicago began gathering in homes to hold spiritual assemblies. The number of followers grew after Pramukh Swami Maharaj visited Chicago in 1974, 1977, and 1980. The growing attendance necessitated a larger permanent space for worship. A building on a four-acre plot of land was acquired in Glen Ellyn, a suburb of Chicago. In 1984, Pramukh Swami Maharaj consecrated murtis in the building and inaugurated the first Shri Swaminarayan Mandir in the Chicago area. Within several years, the number of devotees outgrew the mandir in Glen Ellyn. In 1994, land for the current mandir complex in Bartlett was purchased.

=== Construction ===
The mandir complex is situated on 27 acres. The mandir is classified as a traditional Hindu shikharbaddha mandir and has been built according to principles laid out in the Shilpa Shastras. The Shilpa Shastras are Hindu texts prescribing standards of sacred architecture. Construction of the complex took place over various phases, beginning with the haveli and culminating with the opening of the shikharbaddha mandir. The haveli is a cultural center wherein weekly spiritual assemblies are held.

The limestone and marble stones used in the mandir were quarried from Turkey and Italy and shipped to Gujarat, India. From here, the stones were transported to Rajasthan where they were carved by 2000 craftsmen. In total, 70,000 cubic feet of stone was chiseled and shaped with intricate patterns and designs. Once the stones were sculpted, they were shipped to Chicago. In total, 40,000 pieces of stone were shipped to Chicago, where they were fitted together like a 3D jigsaw puzzle. The mandir exterior is Turkish limestone and the interior is Italian Carrara marble.

The mandir occupies 22,000 square feet, and is 78-feet high, 112-feet wide and 215-feet long. It is topped by 16 domes and has 151 pillars, 117 arches, five pinnacles and four balconies.

Stone metrics
Outside Turkish Limestone	Inside Marble and Granite	Cararra Marble	Bansipahadpur Pinkstone	Total Stone Used
36, 131 cu. ft	31, 000 sq. ft	29, 510 cu.ft	70, 240 cu. ft	8,430 tons

=== Mandir Inauguration ===
The haveli was inaugurated by Pramukh Swami Maharaj on October 29, 2000. The mandir was constructed in 16 months and inaugurated on August 7, 2004 by Pramukh Swami Maharaj. Congressman Henry Hyde and State Representative of Illinois John Miller were in attendance at the ceremony. The mandir's inauguration was celebrated with a 16-day celebration, which included a Vishvashanti Maha yagna (collective prayer for world peace) and a shobhyatra (colorful procession) through downtown Chicago.

=== Architectural recognition ===
In 2004, the BAPS mandir complex was awarded the Chicago Building Congress Merit Award for its unique style of Indian stone architecture and engineering, as well as its positive cultural and spiritual impact on Bartlett. Also in 2005, the mandir was recognized in Stone World magazine as a true symbol of ancient heritage and craftsmanship of traditional Indian temples. The American Institute of Architects has recognized the mandir as one of the 150 Great Places in Illinois.

== Community involvement ==
=== International Women’s Day celebrations ===
Since 2008, the mandir has celebrated International Women's Day by hosting an annual conference. The conference's aims include empowering women and fostering spiritual growth. A conference held on March 22, 2014 was themed ‘Lead from Within.’ The program illustrated that true leadership is rooted in a person's character, actions and examples.

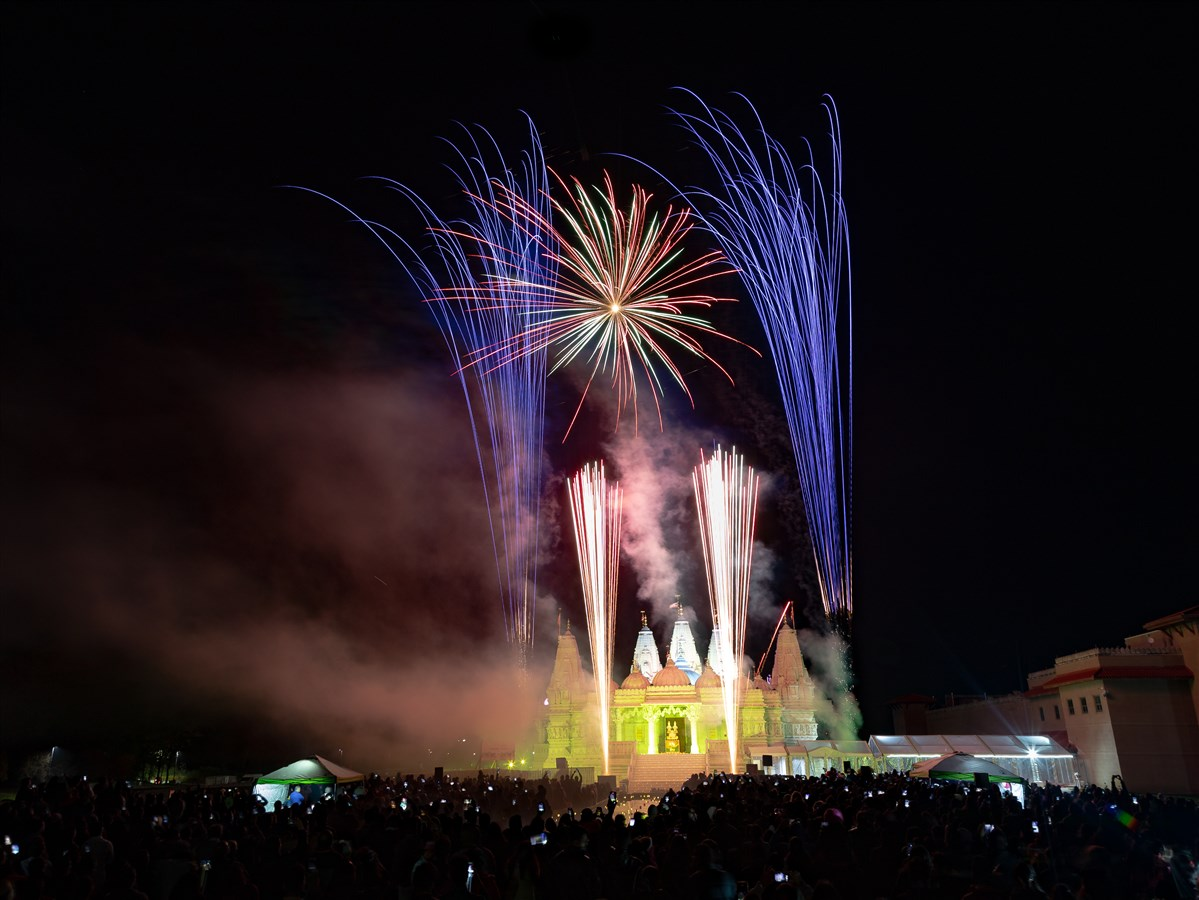
Diwali fireworks celebration at the BAPS Shri Swaminarayan Mandir, Chicago

In 2013, the theme was “Timeless Traditions: Celebrate the Past and Cultivate the Future.” The conference focused on understanding and communicating Hindu traditions and preserving them in order to help nurture future generations.

On April 6, 2019, the mandir held the annual Women's Conference themed "Sādhanā: The Purpose and the Pursuit." The conference elaborated on how sadhana (spiritual practice) plays a role in maintaining strength and courage while navigating life experiences and events.

=== Annual walkathon ===
Alongside BAPS centers throughout North America, the BAPS mandir in Chicago holds an annual walkathon in which members of the congregation raise funds for charities in the community. For the past several years, funds raised from the BAPS walkathon in Chicago have benefited the American Cancer Society.

=== Health fairs ===
BAPS Charities is a global charity that works to provide service through health awareness, educational services, humanitarian relief, environmental protection and preservation and community empowerment. Annual health fairs are a key component of the health and wellness services BAPS Charities provides in Chicago. In 2013, the health fair was held in September. 90 physicians and 30 allied health professionals volunteered to provide medical care and awareness to 525 people. Various types of lab and diagnostic tests were conducted along with different levels of screening. These services are provided free of charge or for nominal fees. The health fairs help provide medical care and advice to underserved members of the community.

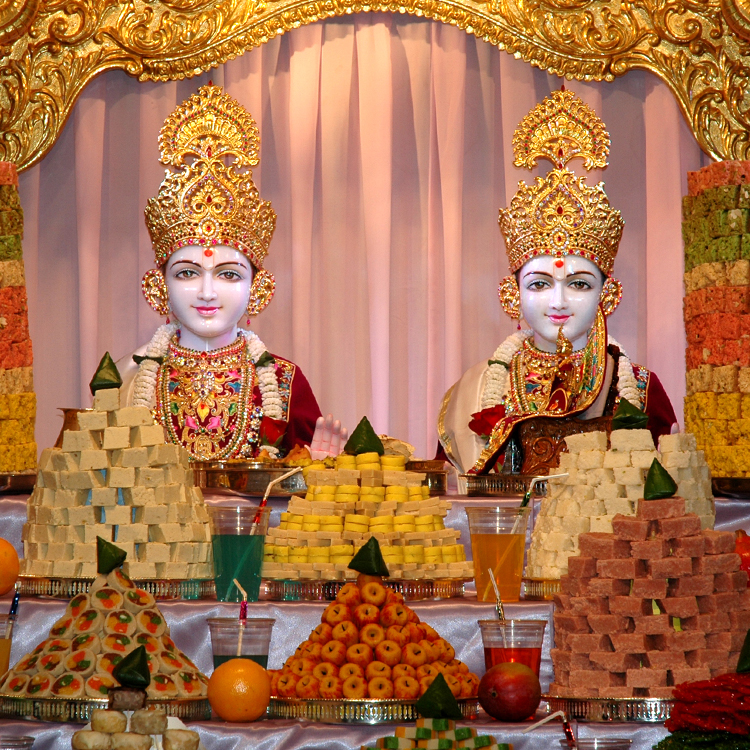
Annakut at the BAPS Shri Swaminarayan Mandir, Chicago

=== Diwali & New Year Celebration ===
Diwali is one of many important festivals to worshiping Hindus. Diwali is also known as the Festival of Lights. Usually diyas (oil lamps) are lit in the home to drive away evil. People also celebrate with light shows and fireworks. BAPS Mandir in Chicago celebrates Diwali by lighting up the Mandir with many lights and also has a firework show that promptly follows the Diwali Maha Aarti. The day after Diwali is the Indian New Year. Many Hindus go to the temple on this day for blessings for the new year. BAPS celebrates this day with Annakut. Annakut means "mountain of food" and it represents the offering of food to god. Every year at BAPS thousands of vegetarian dishes are offered to the gods in return for their blessings. These offerings range from sweets to savory food items such as pizza. Along with Annakut, BAPS also does a New Year Aarti every hour inside the temple so that people visiting at the time can pray and receive blessings.

=== COVID-19 Pandemic ===
During the COVID-19 global pandemic, BAPS Charities provided relief and assistance worldwide. On April 1, 2021, BAPS Charities hosted a vaccination drive in conjunction with Prism Health Lab at the mandir. A total of 1,111 vaccines were administered to essential workers and adults with underlying health conditions. US Surgeon General Vivek Murthy praised BAPS Charities for holding vaccination clinics at mandirs. Regarding the elderly, Murthy noted easier accessibility at the temples “surrounded by trusted friends in familiar settings than it may have been for some of them to get vaccinated at an unfamiliar location.”

== Gallery ==
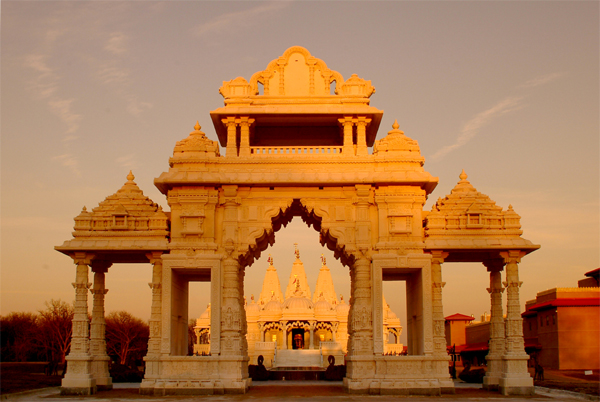

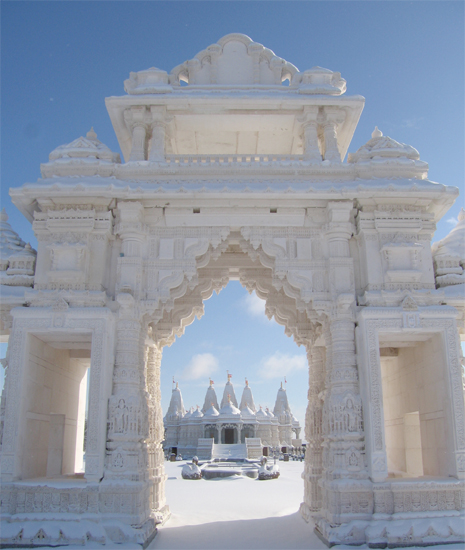

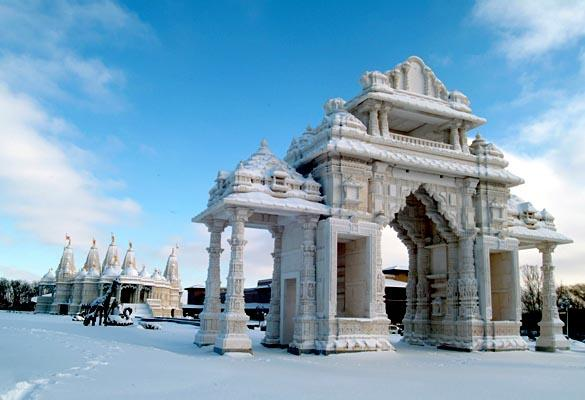

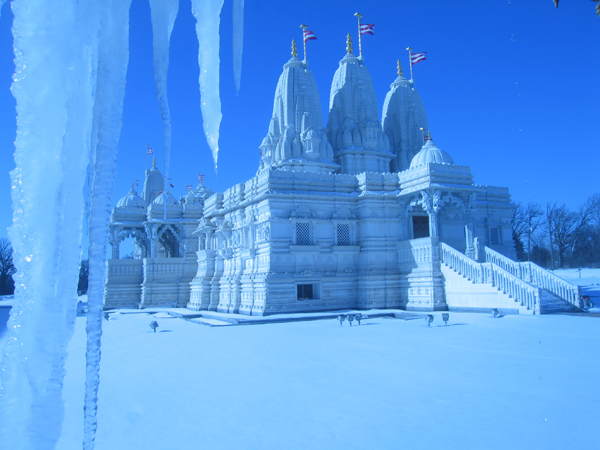

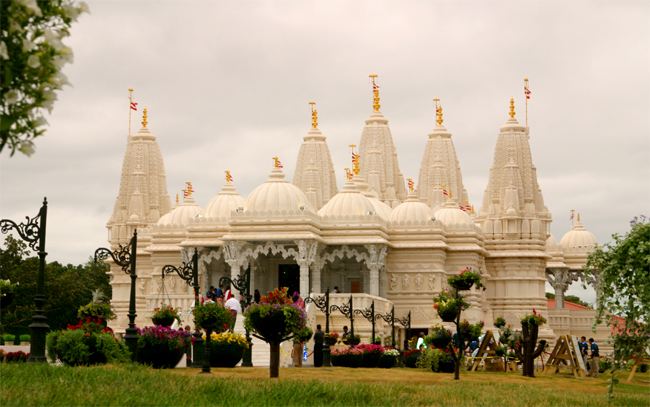

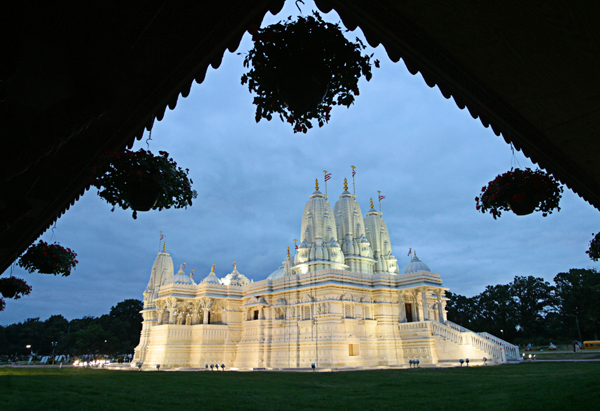

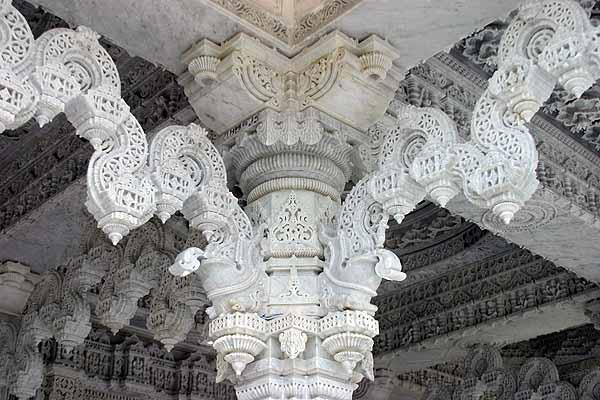

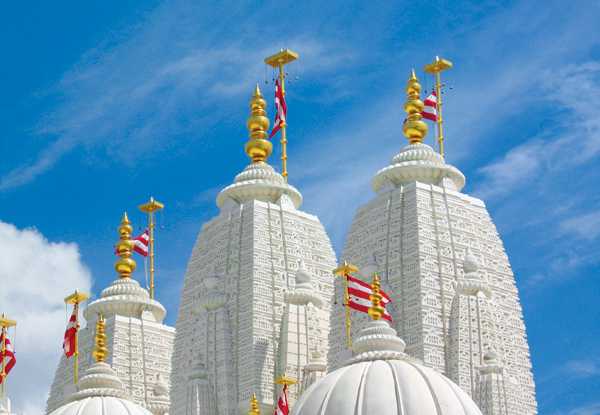

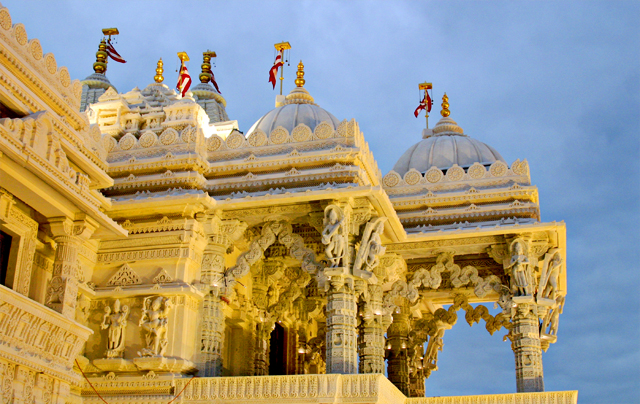

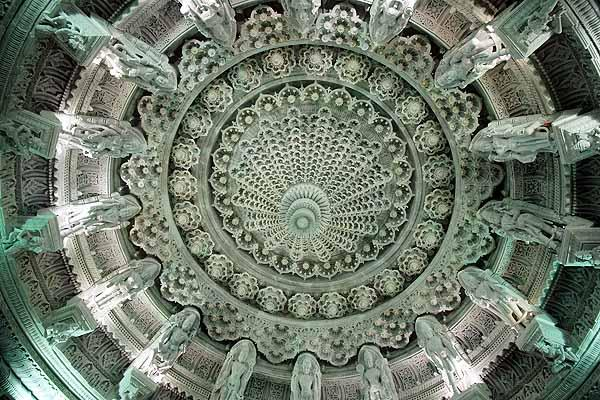

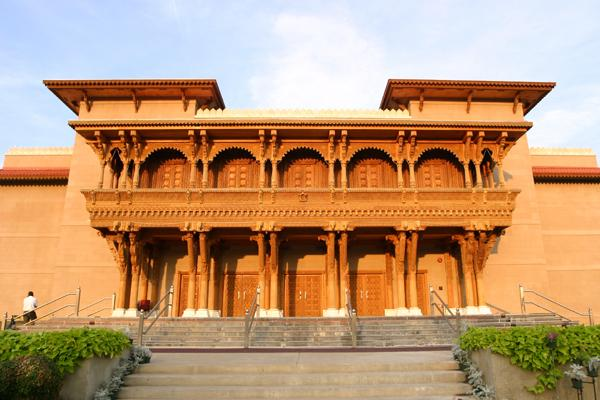

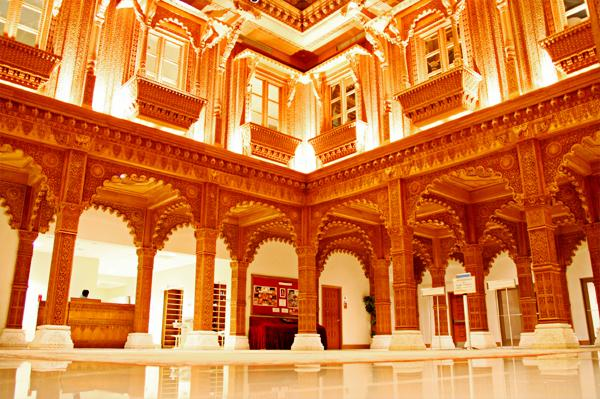

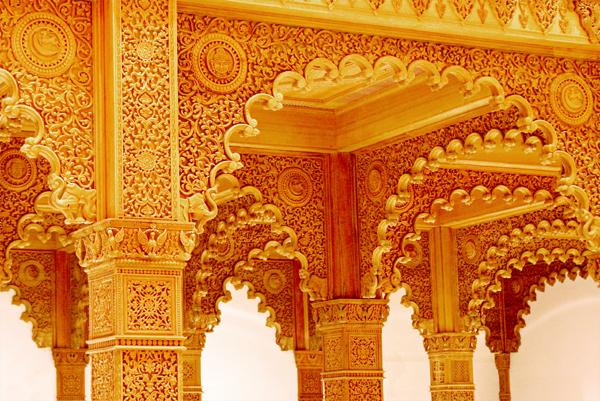

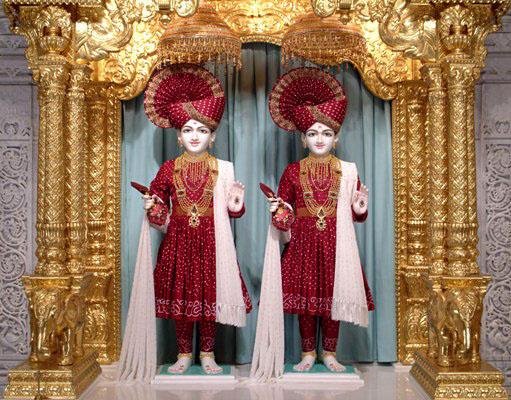
Bhagwan Swaminarayan and Gunatitanand Swami

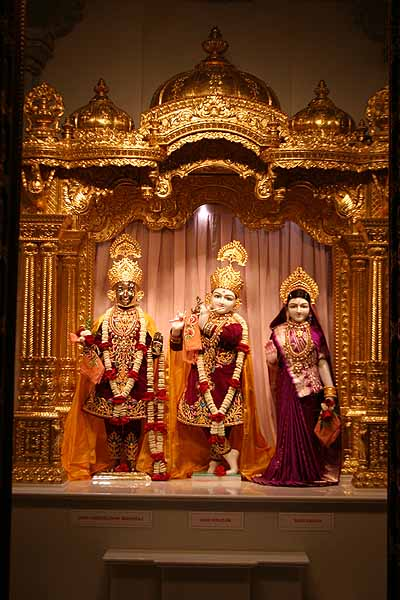
Hari Krishna Maharaj and Radha Krishna

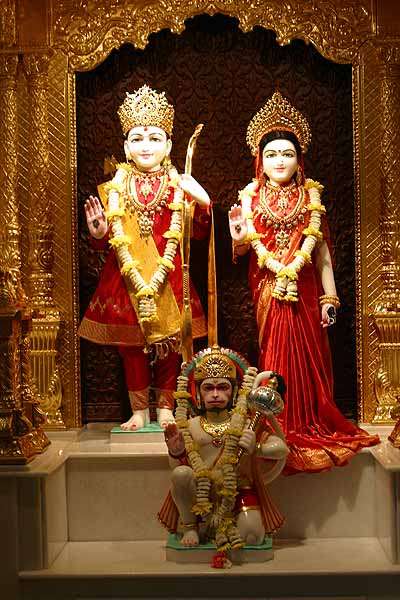
Rama-Sita and Hanuman

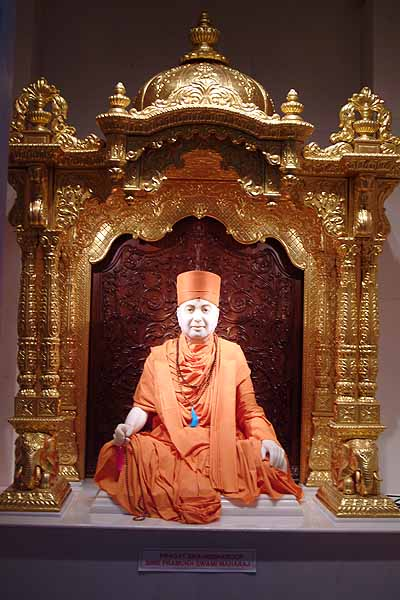
Pramukh Swami Maharaj
