= Elgin National Watch Company Observatory =

- U.S. National Register of Historic Places
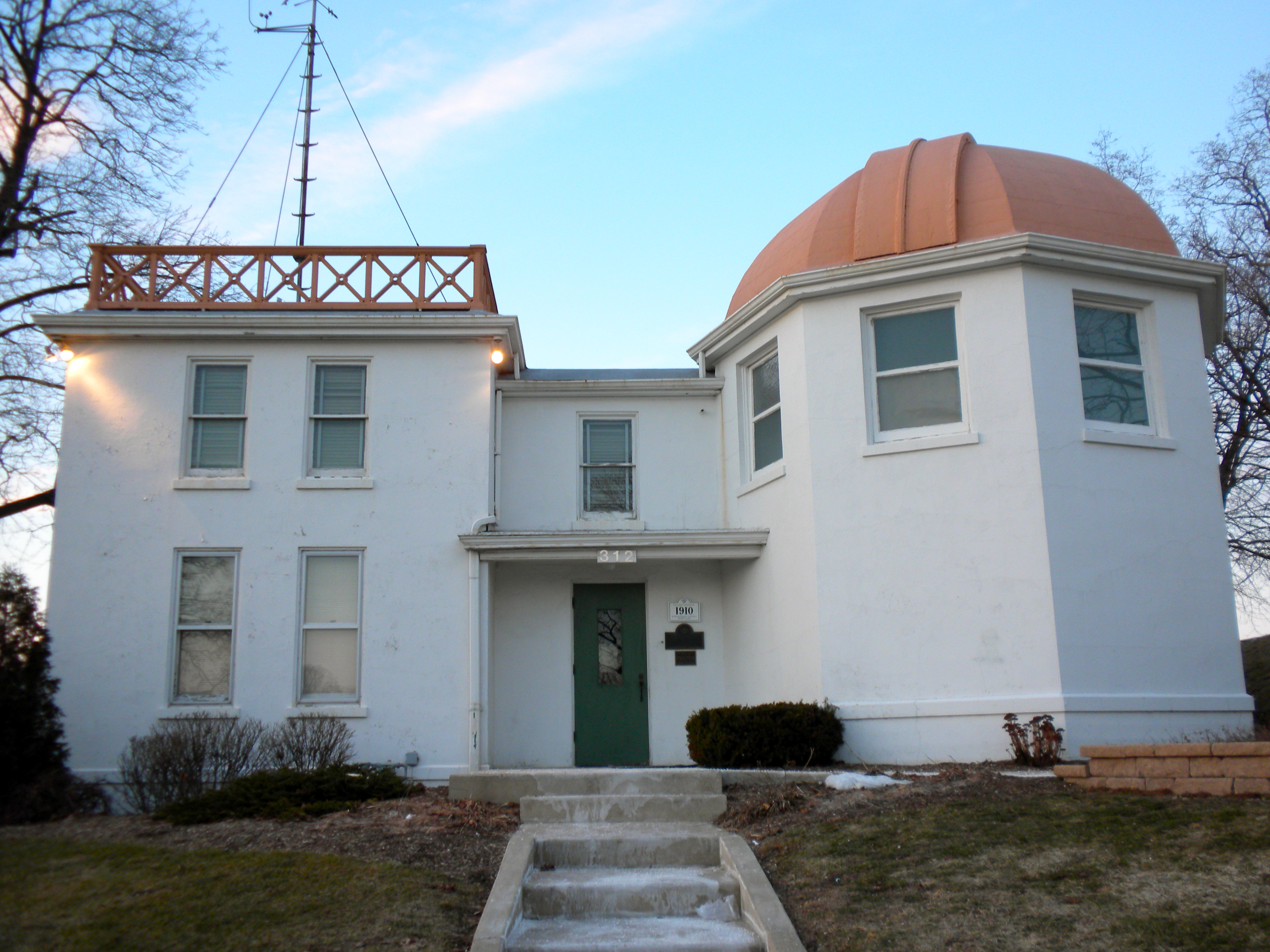

- Location within Illinois Location within the United States
- Location: 312 Watch St., Elgin, Illinois, U.S.
- Coordinates: 42°1′48″N 88°16′24″W
- Area: less than one acre
- Built: 1910
- Architect: George Hunter
- Architectural style: Classical Revival
- NRHP reference No.: 94000976
- Added to NRHP: August 16, 1994

The Elgin National Watch Company Observatory is a historic building in Elgin, in the U.S. state of Illinois. It was built in 1910 to serve the Elgin National Watch Company two blocks to the west. The two-story observatory provided data on time that was scientifically accurate to a tenth of a second. Manufacturers could then produce a more accurate watch. The observatory was an important part of the company's legacy, and they even changed their motto to reflect this. By 1950, the Elgin National Watch Company could no longer compete with wristwatch companies. The observatory was donated to a local school district and became known as the School District U-46 Planetarium/Observatory. The building was added to the National Register of Historic Places in 1994.

== History ==
Elgin was first settled in 1834. In 1850, the Galena and Chicago Union Railroad connected to the city, bolstering the economy. Fourteen years later, two employees at the American Watch Company decided to build their own watch factory with Chicago watchmaker John C. Adams. The National Watch Company was incorporated on August 18, 1864 with $100,000 in capital. Former Chicago mayor Benjamin Wright Raymond suggested Elgin as a location for the factory. The first watch model, named after Raymond, first reached retailers on April 1, 1867. Watches were a burgeoning industry, as the American industrial age demanded efficient timing. The watches were an instant success, and became so synonymous with its hometown that the company re-branded itself the Elgin National Watch Company in 1874. By 1907, the company sold over 600,000 watches—almost one-third of the market share—and employed 3,200 people.

Prior to the creation of time zones, cities had substantial differences in the standards of time—in Wisconsin alone, over thirty-eight times were used at a given moment. In 1908, Theodore Roosevelt finally demanded that the United States Bureau of Standards encourage precise timing across the nation. In 1910, the Elgin National Watch Company decided to respond by building its own observatory so that the timing in its watches would be scientifically accurate. Dr. William W. Payne of the Goodsell Observatory was named the first director. Sidereal time was determined on Riefler Clock No. 220 by measuring the position of the stars in the night sky based on the position of the telescope (which could only move north-south along a meridian line). Eleven vertical wires were inside the telescope eyepiece. An astronomer would press a button every time a star appeared to cross one of the wires, which would send an impulse to the clock. This was compared with the solar time observed on the Riefler Clock No. 224 and results published by the American Ephemeris and Nautical Almanac. The result was a clock that was accurate to the hundredth of a second. In the factory, the sounder audibly ticked off the seconds so that workers could set the watches accurately. After the opening of the observatory, the Elgin National Watch Company adopted the slogan: "Elgin Takes The Time From The Stars And Puts It In Your Pocket". The Illinois government also equipped the observatory with thermometers, a thermograph, barometer, barograph, rain gauge, and weather vane. This was intended to provide data on weather to Springfield, but was also reproduced in local newspapers. The company was watchful of humidity, as this could affect delicate processes.

The Great Depression hit the Elgin National Watch Company badly. Following World War II, Swiss manufacturers began to dominate the pocket watch industry. The final blow came in 1950, when the United States Time Corporation introduced a cheap wristwatch that could be discarded and repurchased for less than the cost of repair. The Elgin National Watch Company ceased watch production in the late 1950s. The observatory was donated to the Elgin Area School District U46 in 1960, who added a planetarium in 1963. This was the first school district planetarium in the State of Illinois. Donald Tuttle (1920–2010) was the first planetarium director. He served from 1963 to 1985. The second director of the Planetarium/Observatory was Gary L. Kutina. He served as director from 1985 to 2009. The observatory was added to the National Register of Historic Places by Gary L. Kutina, Director of the Observatory, on August 16, 1994.

== Architecture ==
The Elgin National Watch Company Observatory is on the northeast corner of Watch and Raymond Streets, two blocks east from where the factory once stood. It was constructed on a gravel base, which could absorb surface vibrations. Concrete piers were dug 60 feet (18 m) down into this layer to secure the telescope and Riefler clocks. The two-story building can be split into three segments: the entrance, the observatory, and the office. The entrance segment connects the other two segments. The walls are made of lath and plaster and the room features a lavatory. The second floor above the entrance is the chronograph room, with one of the two Riefler clocks on a pier. A switchboard in this room directed signals from the observatory to the offices in Chicago. The south wall features a double-hung window. Also to the south is a Warner & Swasey chronograph, used to record the star observations. Also found in the chronograph room were the two auxiliary clocks to the master clocks. These too were Rieflers. One was No. 237 and the other was No. 240. Both clocks are no longer present in the building.

A steel door leads to the entrance of the observatory segment, where there is a stairway to the second floor and a small lavatory. A set of airlock style doors leads to a temperature controlled room with two of the four Riefler clocks on one of the piers. In the clock vault there were 58 light bulbs positioned on the floor. The bulbs would go on and off in accordance to the demand for temperature. The vault was to be maintained at a constant 81 degrees F. These bulbs along with a ventilation shaft could maintain a temperature to within a half of a degree of 81. The two Riefler clocks found in the vault were No. 220 and No. 224. Above the room is a Warner & Swasey celestial transit instrument, on its own pier. The observatory segment is a two-story, concrete, domed octagon, covered with sheet metal. A 3-foot (0.91 m) opening allows observations by the telescope. Steel shutters can close this through a system of chains. Each steel shutter weighed one-half a ton. It was written that the gearing used to open the doors were so easy a child of six could do it.

The office segment is to the west. The first floor segment is 15 by 15 feet (4.6 by 4.6 m) with two double-hung windows on both the south and west walls. Shelves and cabinets remain in the room from when it was in use. The floor is carpet-covered hardwood and the walls are lath and plaster. The second story of the office segment was the sleeping room, where astronomers could sleep. It originally featured a basin and a cot, with two double-hung windows again on the south and west. In 1926, this room was converted into a radio room to transmit short-wave signals. A vintage 1947 Collins transmitter is still in the room. A staircase in the northeast of this room leads to the tin roof, now covered with aluminum paint. A decorative metal rail surrounds the exterior of the office segment roof. The 1963 planetarium 39 by 27 feet (11.9 by 8.2 m) addition is on the rear of the building. It features a perforated aluminum dome and a Spitz A-3-P Star Projector. Up to 65 people can be seated in the addition.

== See also ==
- List of astronomical observatories
