= Bartlett High School (Illinois) =

Location
- 701 Schick Road; Bartlett, Illinois 60103; United States; 41°57′01″N 88°11′32″W

Information
- Type: Public secondary
- Motto: Mutual Respect.
- Established: 1997
- Principal: Timothy Brodeur
- Teaching staff: 141.59 (FTE)
- Grades: 9–12
- Enrollment: 2,091 (2023–2024)
- Student to teacher ratio: 14.77
- Campus: Suburban
- Colors: Forest Green, Navy Blue and White
- Mascot: Hawk
- Newspaper: Hawkeye
- Yearbook: Talon
- Website: bhs.u-46.org/o/bhs
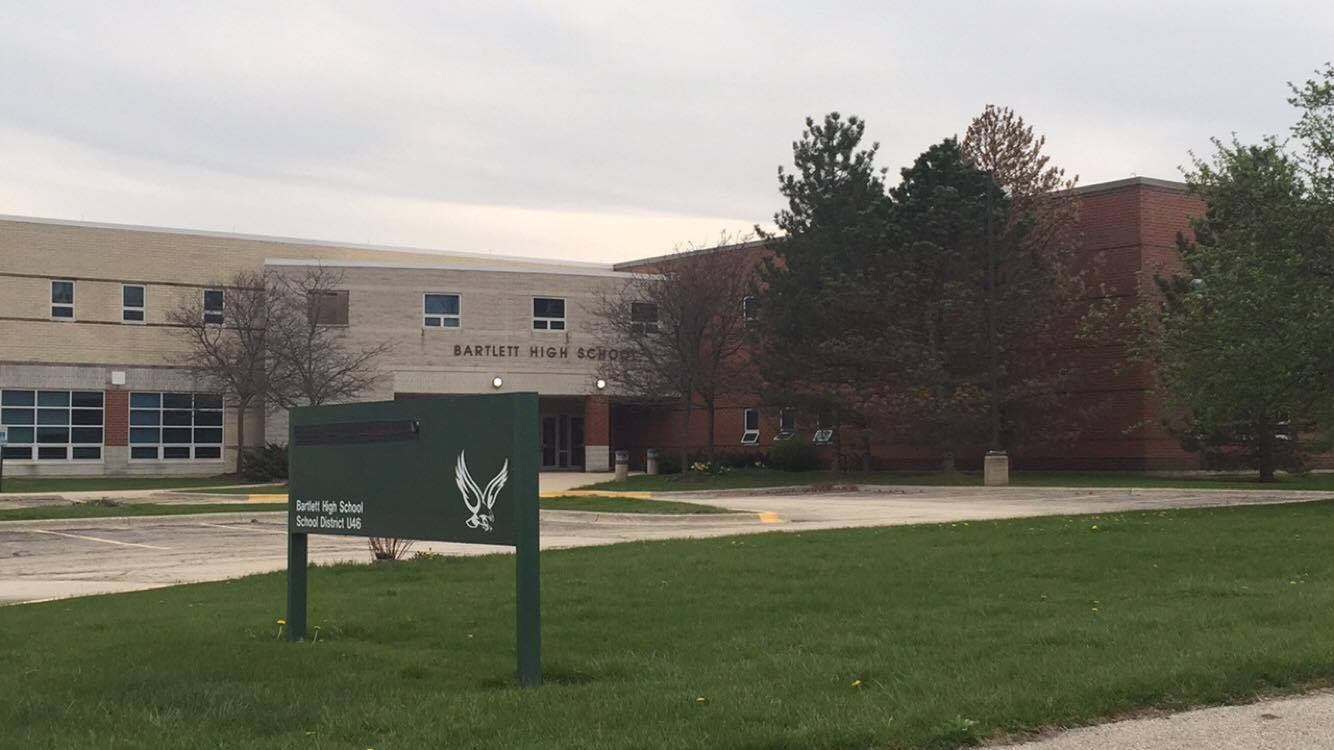

Bartlett High School is a public four-year high school located in Bartlett, Illinois, a northwest suburb of Chicago, Illinois, in the United States. It is part of Elgin Area School District U46, which also includes Elgin High School, Larkin High School, South Elgin High School, and Streamwood High School. The school was opened in August 1997 as the fourth high school in the Elgin Area School District U46.

== About the building ==
Bartlett High School is a 3 story high school with 396,000 square feet on a 22-acre campus including athletic fields and pond. There is an Auditorium that seats approximately 1000 people, an indoor competition size swimming pool and a central student commons/cafeteria area that has the main staircase that connects the three classroom levels. Bartlett High School is the only high school in the Village of Bartlett and was originally designed for 2,800 students. A sports complex including a new football field and bleacher seating for 1,800 was built for the 2018-2019 football season, and sits in between the pond and existing athletic fields.

== Academics ==
In 2014, Bartlett had an average composite ACT score of 21.4, with 86.9% of its students graduating after four years (and 90.4% within five years). Bartlett High is also home to the Academy of Science, Engineering, and High Technology, an advanced curriculum for students with special interest in Technology, Science, Math, and Engineering.

== Athletics ==
Bartlett competes in the Upstate Eight Conference. Its mascot is the Hawk. Bartlett has more than 70 different activities are offered to students including athletics, fine arts, and various clubs/organizations.

== Notable alumni ==
- Jon Walker - lead guitarist and occasional lead vocalist for The Young Veins, previous bassist for Panic! at the Disco
- Vinnie Hinostroza- current forward for the NHL’s Colorado Avalanche
- Shealeigh - Singer/Songwriter
