= Gail Borden Public Library District =

Library in Elgin, Illinois, US

- 42°2′33″N 88°17′17.2″W
- Location: 270 N. Grove Ave, Elgin, Illinois, USA
- Type: Public library
- Established: 1892
- Branches: 2

Collection
- Size: 319,291

Access and use
- Circulation: 1,100,305
- Population served: 144,597

Other information
- Director: Carole Medal
- Employees: 151
- Website: www.gailborden.info

Gail Borden Public Library is a public library district located in Elgin, Illinois. District boundaries include the city and villages of Elgin, South Elgin, Bartlett, Streamwood, and Hoffman Estates. The library is a member of Reaching Across Illinois Library System, one of two multitype regional library systems in Illinois.

== History ==
The library was named in honor of Gail Borden (November 9, 1801 – January 11, 1874), who in 1856 invented condensed milk. Gail Borden never lived in Elgin or donated any funds for the library which bears his name, but in 1892, his stepsons, Samuel and Alfred Church, residents of Elgin, purchased and donated the Scofield Mansion at 50 N. Spring Street to house the new library. Their only request was that the library be forever and always known and called the Gail Borden Public Library.

The library remained at the 50 Spring Street location until the late 1960s when the weight of the books was beginning to strain the ability of the building to hold them all. A new library was built at the Corner of Kimball and Grove, and the library was moved. In 1975/76, the children's department was renovated. Renovations included a climbing play structure with a slide and windows to peek from, an aquarium and a mini zoo with lizards and other interesting creatures. Led by the Children's Librarian, Mary Greenawalt, this was one of the first libraries to incorporate play structures into the library experience. The population began to overwhelm the library resources leading to plans for the new building, which opened in 2003.

== Present day ==
In October 2003, the library moved into a new 153,826 square feet (14,290.9 m^{2}) facility just across the street from the old library at a cost of $29.8 million. The new library is situated along the eastern shore of the Fox River and includes a shelving capacity of 460,000 volumes. The architects, Frye Gillan Molinaro Architects, Ltd, designed the library to accommodate the expected growth in population from 110,000 in 2004 to 165,000 over the next 20 years. The library, a two-story structure, is clad in warm buff and terra cotta-colored stone and inspired by the late 19th and early 20th century architectural Prairie School style, illustrated by Frank Lloyd Wright and others.

In 2009, the Gail Borden Public Library District received the National Medal for Museum and Library Service. This is the highest honor awarded for libraries and museums recognizing their service and contributions within their community.

On August 15, 2009, for the first time in its 135-year history, the Gail Borden Public Library District opened its first branch: The Rakow Branch Library. Designed by architectural firm Engberg Anderson Design Partnership, the building features a popular materials collection, a computer cafe, a zen garden and natural prairie plantings as well as a living room area with fireplace. The building earned gold LEED certification (Leadership in Environmental Energy and Design) due to the numerous environmentally friendly and sustainable features including a geothermal well system for heating and cooling the facility.

On July 24, 2016, the long awaited South Elgin Branch was added to the Gail Borden Library District, expanding it to a total of three buildings. The building was donated by the Hoffer Foundation, and part of the construction costs were offset with money provided by South Elgin. The branch is a 4,275 sq foot building, located at 127 S. McLean Blvd in South Elgin, IL.
