= Preston Larrison =

American baseball player

- Pitcher
- Born: November 19, 1980 (age 45); Aurora, Illinois, U.S.
- Bats: Right Throws: Right
- Stats at Baseball Reference

Preston Wade Larrison (born November 19, 1980) is an American former professional baseball player. As a pitcher, Larrison played college baseball for the University of Evansville and in minor league baseball from 2002 through 2009.

== Career ==
Larrison attended West Aurora High School in Aurora, Illinois. Playing for the school's baseball team, he was considered one of the best high school baseball players in the Chicago area by the Chicago Tribune. Though the Tampa Bay Devil Rays selected Larrison in the 20th round of the 1998 Major League Baseball (MLB) Draft, Larrison opted not to sign with the Devil Rays. He then enrolled at the University of Evansville, where he played college baseball for the Evansville Purple Aces. He was named a Freshman All-American by Baseball America and Collegiate Baseball in 1999. In 2000, he played collegiate summer baseball with the Falmouth Commodores of the Cape Cod Baseball League.

The Detroit Tigers selected Larrison in the second round of the 2001 MLB draft. In 2002, Larrison pitched to a 10-5 win–loss record, a 2.39 earned run average, and a .199 batting average against for the Lakeland Tigers of the Class A-Advanced Florida State League. He was considered for a spot in the Tigers' starting rotation in 2003, but was assigned to the Erie SeaWolves of the Class AA Eastern League. He competed in the 2003 All-Star Futures Game, recording the win.

Larrison suffered an arm injury, requiring Tommy John surgery in 2004. Larrison continued to suffer injuries, spending time on the disabled list in every season. The Tigers invited Larrison to spring training in 2007 and 2008, though he failed to make the Tigers' roster on either occasion. Released by the Tigers during the 2008 season, Larrison signed a minor league contract with the Cleveland Indians in July, and played for the Buffalo Bisons of the International League for the remainder of the season. Larrison signed with the Washington Nationals organization for the 2009 season, and pitched for the Syracuse Chiefs, also of the International League.

Following his retirement after the 2009 season, Larrison opened a youth baseball academy.
