= Shaun Pruitt =

American professional basketball player (born 1985)

Personal information
- Born: November 22, 1985 (age 40) Chicago, Illinois
- Listed height: 6 ft 10 in (2.08 m)
- Listed weight: 245 lb (111 kg)

Career information
- High school: West Aurora (Aurora, Illinois)
- College: Illinois (2004–2008)
- NBA draft: 2008: undrafted
- Playing career: 2008–2016
- Position: Power forward / center

Career history
- 2008–2009: Prostějov (Czech Republic)
- 2009: Ventspils (Latvia)
- 2009: Fujian Xunxing (China)
- 2009: Peristeri (Greece)
- 2010: Gallitos de Isabela (Puerto Rico)
- 2011: Mets de Guaynabo (Puerto Rico)
- 2011: Halcones Rojos Veracruz (Mexico)
- 2012: Trotamundos de Carabobo (Venezuela)
- 2012: Titanes del Licey (Dominican Republic)
- 2013: Club Atlético Aguada (Uruguay)
- 2014: Marinos de Anzoátegui (Venezuela)
- 2015: Enriquillo (Dominican Republic)

Career highlights
- LPB All-Star (2012); BSN All-Star (2010); Third-team All-Big Ten (2007)

Shaun Steven Pruitt (born November 22, 1985) is an American former professional basketball player. He played college basketball for the University of Illinois before going undrafted in the 2008 NBA draft.

== High school career ==
Pruitt attended Providence St. Mel School in Chicago as a freshman in 2000–01 where he was a member of a 23-7 super-sectional team, before transferring to West Aurora High School in Aurora, Illinois for his sophomore year. As a sophomore in 2001–02, he missed much of the season with a broken right foot. He still managed 17 games with averages of 12.5 points and 6.5 rebounds per game. As a junior in 2002–03, he again missed time with a broken ankle, managing just eight games with averages of 14.5 points and 7.5 rebounds per game.

On November 12, 2003, Pruitt signed a National Letter of Intent to play college basketball for the University of Illinois.

As a senior in 2003–04, Pruitt led West Aurora to tie a school record with 32 wins and a third-place finish at the Class AA state tournament, averaging 16.5 points, 8.5 rebounds, four blocks, two assists and two steals per game. He captured DuPage Valley Conference MVP honors after leading his team to a third consecutive 14-0 conference record, 45 consecutive conference wins and fifth-straight conference championship overall. He was also named first-team All-State by the Associated Press, IBCA and Chicago Tribune, Aurora Beacon News Player of the Year, and second-team All-State by the Chicago Sun-Times.

College recruiting
Name	Hometown	School	Height	Weight	Commit date
Shaun Pruitt; PF	Aurora, Illinois	West Aurora (Illinois)	6 ft 8 in (2.03 m)	220 lb (100 kg)	Nov 12, 2003
Shaun Pruitt; PF	Recruit ratings: Scout: Rivals:				
Overall recruit ranking: Scout: 18 (PF) Rivals: 14 (PF)
Note: In many cases, Scout, Rivals, 247Sports, On3, and ESPN may conflict in their listings of height and weight.; In these cases, the average was taken. ESPN grades are on a 100-point scale.; Sources: "2004 Illinois Basketball Commitment List". Rivals.; "2004 Illinois Basketball Commitment List". Scout.; "Scout.com Team Recruiting Rankings". Scout.; "2004 Team Ranking". Rivals.

== College career ==
=== Freshman year ===
In the 2004–05 season, Pruitt played in 21 games for Illinois while averaging 1.4 points per game and totalling 19 rebounds, 3 steals and 1 block in helping the Illini go 37-2, and make it to the NCAA Championship game against the University of North Carolina at Chapel Hill where they lost. Pruitt played with several future NBA players during his freshman season such as Deron Williams and Luther Head who were both first round draft picks.

=== Sophomore year ===
In the 2005–06 season, Pruitt moved into the starting line-up and started all 33 games while averaging 6.2 points and 5.1 rebounds per game in helping the Illini go 26-7 as a sophomore. He scored in double figures six times as he was one of Illinois' most improved players.

=== Junior year ===
In the 2006–07 season, Pruitt started all 35 games while averaging 11.4 points and 7.5 rebounds per game in helping the Illini go 23-12 as a junior. He had a career best game against Indiana University with 16 points and 12 rebounds. He subsequently earned third-team All-Big Ten honors from league coaches and media.

=== Senior year ===
In the 2007–08 season, Pruitt started 33 out of 34 games while averaging 12.6 points and 7.3 rebounds per game and shot a career best 56% from the free-throw line while leading the Illini to a 16-19 finish as a senior. He was a third-team All-Big Ten selection by media and honorable mention All-Big Ten by league coaches. He finished his four-year career with 1,058 points, 697 rebounds, 52 blocks, 49 assists and 42 steals.

== Professional career ==
=== 2008–09 season ===
After going undrafted in the 2008 NBA draft, Pruitt joined the New Orleans Hornets for the 2008 NBA Summer League. In August 2008, he signed with Prostějov of the Czech Republic for the 2008–09 season. In February 2009, he left Prostějov and signed with Ventspils of Latvia for the rest of the season. However, he left Ventspils in March after just one game and signed with Fujian Xunxing for the rest of the 2008–09 CBA season.

=== 2009–10 season ===
On September 21, 2009, Pruitt signed with the Golden State Warriors. However, he was later waived by the Warriors on October 21, 2009. A week later, he signed with Peristeri of Greece for the 2009–10 season. However, he was later released by Peristeri on December 2, 2009 after managing just two games.

In February 2010, Pruitt signed with Gallitos de Isabela for the 2010 BSN season. On May 9, 2010, he was released by Gallitos but later returned to the team for the final two games of the season on May 28 and May 30.

=== 2010–11 season ===
In July 2010, Pruitt joined the Phoenix Suns for the 2010 NBA Summer League. On September 5, 2010, he signed a one-year deal with Cedevita Zagreb of the A-1 Liga. However, he was later released by the club on September 16, 2010 after he failed the club's medical exam.

In March 2011, Pruitt signed with Mets de Guaynabo for the 2011 BSN season.

=== 2011–12 season ===
On July 12, 2011, Pruitt signed with Halcones Rojos Veracruz of Mexico for the 2011–12 season. He left Halcones in November 2011 after just nine games. On December 9, 2011, he signed with the Minnesota Timberwolves. However, he was later waived by the Timberwolves four days later.

On February 14, 2012, Pruitt signed with Trotamundos de Carabobo for the 2012 LPB season.

=== 2012–13 season ===
In July 2012, Pruitt signed with Titanes Del Distrito Nacional for the 2012 LNB season. He was later released by Titanes on August 22, 2012 in favor of Ryan Humphrey.

On January 30, 2013, Pruitt signed with Club Atlético Aguada of Uruguay for the rest of the 2012–13 season. He was later released in February 2013 after just three games. In March 2013, he signed with Mets de Guaynabo for a second stint, but was later released in April 2013 before playing for them.

=== 2013–14 season ===
On January 8, 2014, Pruitt signed with Marinos de Anzoátegui for the 2014 LPB season.

=== 2014–15 season ===
On November 1, 2014, Pruitt was selected by the Grand Rapids Drive in the third round of the 2014 NBA Development League Draft. However, he was later waived by Grand Rapids on November 13, 2014.

== Personal ==
Pruitt is the son Steve and Debra Pruitt. His father played college basketball for Olive–Harvey College.
