= Norman Melchert =

Norman Melchert (born 1933) is a philosopher and author. He taught at Lehigh University from 1962 until his retirement in 1995. He is the author of several books, the most notable of which is his introduction to philosophy, The Great Conversation: A Historical Introduction to Philosophy.

== Early life and influences ==
Norman Melchert was born in 1933 in Waterloo, Iowa. The son of a prominent Lutheran minister, Christian thought has been a strong influence on his life, thought, and works.

As a young man, he felt moved to follow in his father's footsteps and become a minister. To this end he graduated from Wartburg College in 1955 and went on to Lutheran Theological Seminary at Philadelphia, simultaneously doing graduate work at the University of Pennsylvania. He graduated from seminary in 1958, and from U. Penn in 1959 (Master's degree) and 1964 (PhD). His thesis was an examination of the work of the American realist and humanist, Roy Wood Sellars. He resigned from the ministry in 1965 and devoted his energies to philosophy, being particularly interested in epistemology, ethics, and the philosophy of mind.

== Personal life ==
In 1956 Norman married Novalene Black, who became his lifelong partner. Together they have three children.

He retired from Lehigh University in 1995 and with his wife moved to Richmond, Virginia where two of his sons and their families live. He then became an adjunct professor at Virginia Commonwealth University, teaching occasionally and continuing with his writings.

In the mid 1970s he took up cycling and became a very successful racer in the veteran's class, winning many medals and trophies in Pennsylvania, Virginia and New Zealand, where his eldest son lives. In 1991 he rode across the country with two friends from Seattle to Cape May New Jersey.

== Books ==
- Realism, Materialism and the Mind: The Philosophy of Roy Wood Sellars

Originally his PhD thesis, this book was published in 1968.

- Who's to Say?

A dialogue involving six friends from university days on a cycling tour. Ten years on, they revive the lively discussions they had as students, this time discussing relativism. The six friends each take a different perspective on the issue and these are each presented without comment, allowing the reader to make a kind of Kierkegaardian choice. An interesting aspect of the work is that their tour forms a kind of allegory of the discussion (for example, the riders encounter long and steep hills on days when they discuss particularly difficult issues).

Who's to Say? is available at Google Books.

- The Great Conversation: A Historical Introduction to Philosophy

By far his most popular work, this widely used textbook is currently in its eighth edition. It looks at philosophy as a conversation through the ages on matters of the deepest concern to humanity. Starting from Homer and Hesiod, the book moves through history, presenting each philosopher's work in part as a response to previous philosophers. The latest edition includes sections on contemporary philosophers as well as Muslim, Buddhist, and Jewish thinkers.

- Philosophical Conversations: A Concise Introduction

An abbreviated and illustrated version of The Great Conversation.
