= Catherine J. Melchert =

American politician

Mayor of Bartlett, Illinois
- In office April, 1993 – April 2009

Personal details
- Party: Democratic

Catherine J. Melchert is the former mayor of Bartlett, Illinois from 1993 to 2009. In 1982 she was appointed trustee, and later elected to a two-year term in 1983. She served as a trustee until 1993, when she was elected mayor. She has been a Bartlett resident since 1970.

In 2008, the U.S. Conference of Mayors gave Melchert a "small town honorable mention climate award" for her work in adopting a new building code that promoted environmental protection and conservation.

== See also ==
- Bartlett, Illinois
