= Streamwood, Illinois =

- Village
- Flag Seal

- Location of Streamwood in Cook County, Illinois.

- Location within Chicago metropolitan area Location within Illinois Location within the United States
- Coordinates: 42°1′14″N 88°10′24″W
- Country: United States
- State: Illinois
- County: Cook

Government
  - Village President: Billie Roth

Area
  - Total: 7.83 sq mi (20.28 km^{2})
  - Land: 7.80 sq mi (20.20 km^{2})
  - Water: 0.035 sq mi (0.09 km^{2})

Population (2020)
  - Total: 39,577
  - Density: 5,075.1/sq mi (1,959.51/km^{2})
- Time zone: UTC−6 (CST)
  - Summer (DST): UTC−5 (CDT)
- ZIP Code(s): 60107
- Area code(s): 630, 331
- FIPS code: 17-73157
- Website: www.streamwood.org

Streamwood is a village in Cook County, Illinois, United States. Per the 2020 census, the population was 39,577. It is a northwest suburb of Chicago, and is a part of the Chicago metropolitan area.

Streamwood is one of the three communities that make up the so-called "Tri Village" area, along with Bartlett and Hanover Park. Streamwood was first incorporated as a village on February 9, 1957.

== Geography ==
Streamwood is located at 42°1′14″N 88°10′24″W (42.020627, -88.173409).

According to the 2010 census, Streamwood has a total area of 7.854 square miles (20.34 km^{2}), of which 7.82 square miles (20.25 km^{2}) (or 99.57%) is land and 0.034 square miles (0.09 km^{2}) (or 0.43%) is water.

=== Parks and libraries ===
The village is primarily served by the Poplar Creek Library District and the Streamwood Park District. Residents east of Barrington Road are served by the Schaumburg Township District Library and the Schaumburg Park District. Residents who live west of Rt. 59 are served by the Gail Borden Public Library District in Elgin.

- Poplar Creek Public Library
- Renner Academic Library at Elgin Community College
- Schaumburg Township District Library
- Streamwood Park District
- Schaumburg Park District
- Gail Borden Library

=== Climate ===
Climate data for Streamwood, Illinois (1991–2020)
Month	Jan	Feb	Mar	Apr	May	Jun	Jul	Aug	Sep	Oct	Nov	Dec	Year
Mean daily maximum °F (°C)	32.3 (0.2)	36.7 (2.6)	47.7 (8.7)	61.0 (16.1)	72.9 (22.7)	83.4 (28.6)	86.9 (30.5)	84.8 (29.3)	78.1 (25.6)	64.8 (18.2)	49.8 (9.9)	37.7 (3.2)	61.3 (16.3)
Daily mean °F (°C)	23.0 (−5.0)	26.4 (−3.1)	36.5 (2.5)	48.2 (9.0)	59.7 (15.4)	70.2 (21.2)	74.1 (23.4)	72.3 (22.4)	64.8 (18.2)	52.2 (11.2)	39.2 (4.0)	28.3 (−2.1)	49.6 (9.8)
Mean daily minimum °F (°C)	13.7 (−10.2)	16.1 (−8.8)	25.3 (−3.7)	35.4 (1.9)	46.5 (8.1)	57.0 (13.9)	61.4 (16.3)	59.8 (15.4)	51.4 (10.8)	39.6 (4.2)	28.7 (−1.8)	18.9 (−7.3)	37.8 (3.2)
Average precipitation inches (mm)	1.90 (48)	1.70 (43)	2.09 (53)	3.64 (92)	4.66 (118)	4.72 (120)	3.34 (85)	4.45 (113)	3.58 (91)	3.51 (89)	2.51 (64)	1.92 (49)	38.02 (965)
Average snowfall inches (cm)	11.9 (30)	6.0 (15)	4.8 (12)	0.7 (1.8)	0.0 (0.0)	0.0 (0.0)	0.0 (0.0)	0.0 (0.0)	0.0 (0.0)	0.1 (0.25)	1.8 (4.6)	8.7 (22)	34 (85.65)
Source: NOAA

== Demographics ==
Historical population
Census	Pop.	Note	%±
1960	4,821		—
1970	18,176		277.0%
1980	23,456		29.0%
1990	30,987		32.1%
2000	36,407		17.5%
2010	39,858		9.5%
2020	39,577		−0.7%
U.S. Decennial Census; 2010 2020

=== Racial and ethnic composition ===
Streamwood village, Illinois – Racial and ethnic composition Note: the US Census treats Hispanic/Latino as an ethnic category. This table excludes Latinos from the racial categories and assigns them to a separate category. Hispanics/Latinos may be of any race.
Race / Ethnicity (NH = Non-Hispanic)	Pop 2000	Pop 2010	Pop 2020	% 2000	% 2010	% 2020
White alone (NH)	25,130	20,262	16,563	69.03%	50.84%	41.85%
Black or African American alone (NH)	1,352	1,655	2,251	3.71%	4.15%	5.69%
Native American or Alaska Native alone (NH)	47	34	29	0.13%	0.09%	0.07%
Asian alone (NH)	3,135	5,935	6,291	8.61%	14.89%	15.90%
Native Hawaiian or Pacific Islander alone (NH)	2	9	4	0.01%	0.02%	0.01%
Other race alone (NH)	43	53	111	0.12%	0.13%	0.28%
Mixed race or Multiracial (NH)	590	672	963	1.62%	1.69%	2.43%
Hispanic or Latino (any race)	6,108	11,238	13,365	16.78%	28.20%	33.77%
Total	36,407	39,858	39,577	100.00%	100.00%	100.00%

=== 2020 census ===
As of the 2020 census, Streamwood had a population of 39,577 people.

The median age was 38.9 years. 21.6% of residents were under the age of 18 and 13.8% of residents were 65 years of age or older. For every 100 females there were 98.6 males, and for every 100 females age 18 and over there were 96.8 males age 18 and over.

100.0% of residents lived in urban areas, while 0.0% lived in rural areas.

There were 13,392 households and 9,839 families in Streamwood. 33.5% of households had children under the age of 18 living in them. Of all households, 55.0% were married-couple households, 15.8% were households with a male householder and no spouse or partner present, and 22.9% were households with a female householder and no spouse or partner present. About 20.2% of all households were made up of individuals, and 7.8% had someone living alone who was 65 years of age or older.

There were 13,797 housing units at an average density of 1,761.62 per square mile (680.16/km2), of which 2.9% were vacant. The population density was 5,053.24 inhabitants per square mile (1,950.98/km2). The homeowner vacancy rate was 1.1% and the rental vacancy rate was 5.2%.

=== Income and poverty ===
The median income for a household in the village was $88,917, and the median income for a family was $97,537. Males had a median income of $43,367 versus $33,410 for females. The per capita income for the village was $31,692. About 4.3% of families and 6.8% of the population were below the poverty line, including 6.9% of those under age 18 and 4.3% of those age 65 or over.

=== Religion ===
Streamwood is home to a diverse variety of places of worship across various religious denomination, including, but not limited to :

- Faith Missionary Baptist Church
- Immanuel United Church of Christ
- Grace Bible Church
- Grace Lutheran Church
- Mercy Community Church
- New Hope Community
- St. John the Evangelist Catholic Church
- The Church in Streamwood
- Truelight Lutheran Church
- Christ Community Church
- Baitul Ilm
- Shree Swaminarayan Gadi Temple Midwest Chicago
- Madhav Kendra (Temporarily Closed)
- Awana - Headquarters of the international evangelical Christian nonprofit organization in child and youth discipleship.

== Education ==
The village is primarily served by a unified school district, Elgin Area School District U46, the second largest school district in Illinois. U-46 provides educational services to nearly 40,000 students in area of approximately 90 square miles (230 km^{2}) in Cook, DuPage and Kane Counties. A small subdivision east of Barrington Road is served by School District 54 (Kindergarten through Junior High) and Township District 211 (High school.) The village is also served by and falls entirely within the boundaries of the Elgin Community College District.

- District U-46
- Township District 211
- District 54
- Elgin Community College District 509 (known commonly as ECC)

The village is also one of the locations of Northwest Academy, a private therapeutic day school serving special education students from school districts within a 50-mile (80 km) radius.

== Transportation ==
The Bartlett station provides Metra commuter rail service along the Milwaukee District West Line in nearby Bartlett. Trains travel east to Chicago Union Station, and west to Big Timber Road station.

Pace provides bus service on Route 554 directly connecting Streamwood to Schaumburg and other destinations.

== Streamwood Stride ==
The Streamwood Stride is an endurance race. It is held in Streamwood on the second weekend of June. The 2010 Streamwood Stride was its 12th race, and included the 5k run/walk, the 10k run, kiddie races of 50m and 100m, the double derby (which is Streamwood Stride teamed up with Bartlett Blossom Run), and the 1-mile (1.6 km) fun run.
