= Bartlett, Illinois =

- Village
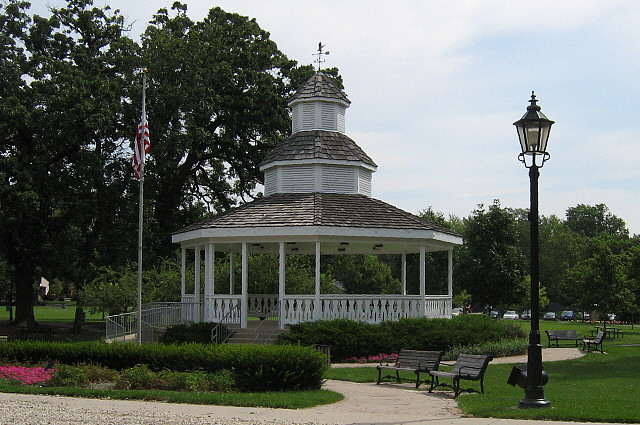
- The Bartlett gazebo in Bartlett Park

- Flag Seal
- Motto: "History, Harmony, Pride"
- Location of Bartlett in DuPage, Cook, and Kane Counties, Illinois.

- Location within Chicago metropolitan area Location within Illinois Location within the United States
- Coordinates: 41°59′43″N 88°11′8″W
- Country: United States
- State: Illinois
- Counties: DuPage, Cook, Kane
- Township: Hanover (Cook) · Wayne (DuPage) · Elgin (Kane) · St. Charles (Kane)
- Incorporated: 1891
- Founder: Luther Bartlett

Government
  - Type: Mayor–council
  - Village president: Dan Gunsteen

Area
  - Total: 15.94 sq mi (41.29 km^{2})
  - Land: 15.75 sq mi (40.79 km^{2})
  - Water: 0.19 sq mi (0.50 km^{2})
- Elevation: 797 ft (243 m)

Population (2020)
  - Total: 41,105
  - Density: 2,610.0/sq mi (1,007.71/km^{2})
- Up 12.27% from 2000

Standard of living (2009-11)
  - Per capita income: $34,402
  - Median home value: $297,800
- Time zone: UTC-6 (CST)
  - Summer (DST): UTC-5 (CDT)
- ZIP Codes: 60103, 60133
- Area codes: 630 and 331
- FIPS code: 17-04013
- GNIS feature ID: 2398041
- Website: www.bartlettil.gov

Bartlett is a village in Illinois, United States. The population was 41,105 at the 2020 census. The village is primarily located in Cook and DuPage counties, with a small parcel on the western border located in Kane County. Bartlett is part of the Chicago metropolitan area.

== History ==
In its earliest times, the Village of Bartlett, Illinois, served as a hunting and camping ground for the Cherokee, Miami, Potawatomi, and Ottawa Indians. Throughout the past, the Northwest Territory, Virginia, Indiana, Spain, France and England had staked their claim for Bartlett. However, the territory was owned by a man named Luther Bartlett. Luther and Sophia Bartlett had decided that a station stop would be beneficial for their town and townspeople. In 1873, Bartlett gave a monetary contribution and half of his 40-acre woodlot towards the construction for a train depot, which is why the town is named after Luther Bartlett. Bartlett later became one of the premiere pig towns, becoming their main export for years to come. A petition for incorporation was filed in Springfield on February 11, 1891. The village was incorporated on June 21, 1892. Bartlett experienced the majority of its population growth in the 1980s.

== Geography ==
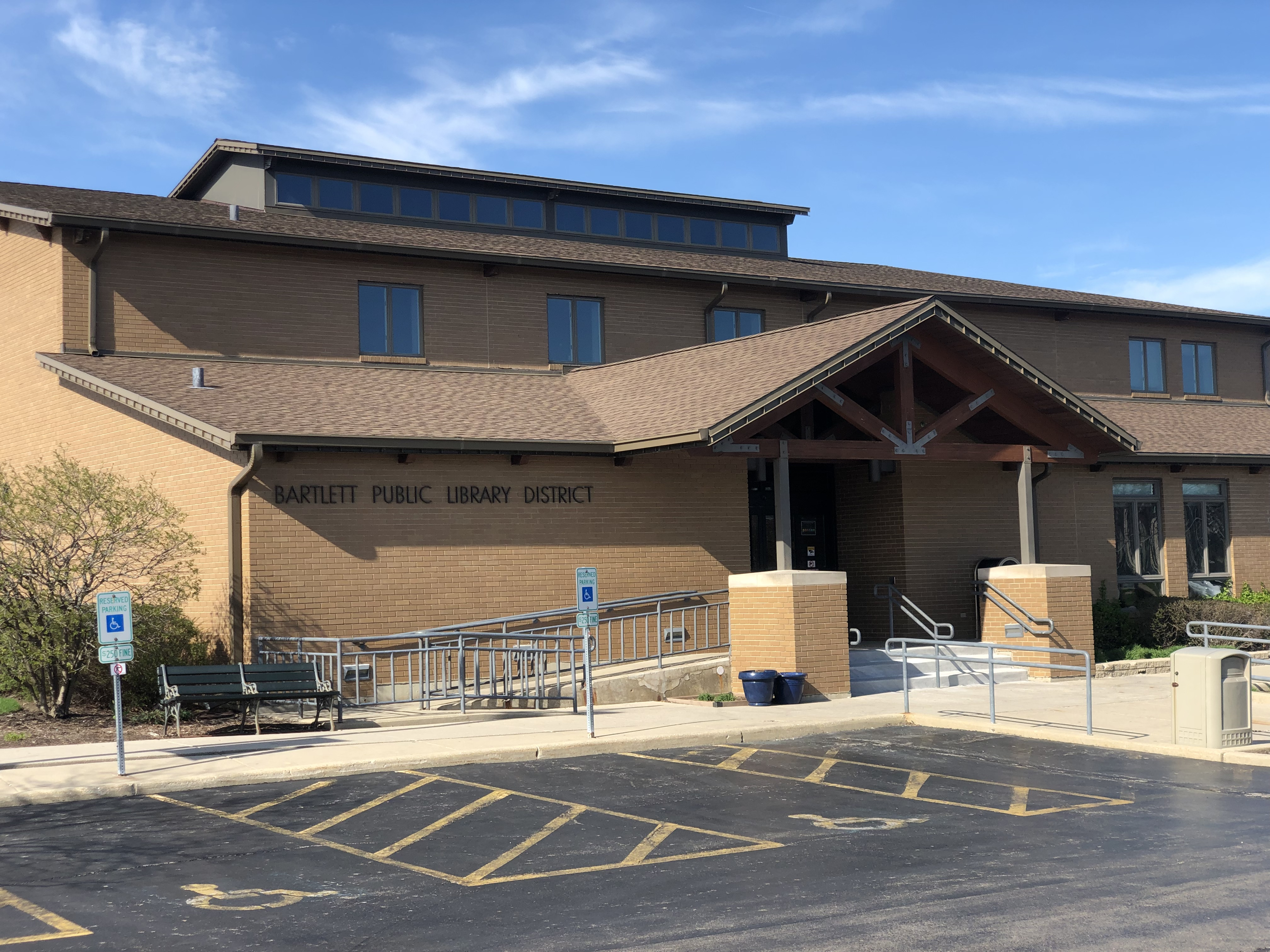
Bartlett Public Library

According to the 2021 census gazetteer files, Bartlett has a total area of 15.92 square miles (41.23 km^{2}), of which 15.73 square miles (40.74 km^{2}) (or 98.78%) is land and 0.19 square miles (0.49 km^{2}) (or 1.22%) is water.

== Demographics ==
=== Racial and ethnic composition ===
Bartlett village, Illinois – Racial and ethnic composition Note: the US Census treats Hispanic/Latino as an ethnic category. This table excludes Latinos from the racial categories and assigns them to a separate category. Hispanics/Latinos may be of any race.
Race / Ethnicity (NH = Non-Hispanic)	Pop 2000	Pop 2010	Pop 2020	% 2000	% 2010	% 2020
White alone (NH)	30,673	30,169	26,377	83.56%	73.21%	64.17%
Black or African American alone (NH)	706	917	995	1.92%	2.23%	2.42%
Native American or Alaska Native alone (NH)	30	36	31	0.08%	0.09%	0.08%
Asian alone (NH)	2,854	5,895	7,345	7.78%	14.31%	17.87%
Pacific Islander alone (NH)	8	7	6	0.02%	0.02%	0.01%
Other race alone (NH)	33	56	95	0.09%	0.14%	0.23%
Mixed race or Multiracial (NH)	378	571	1,309	1.03%	1.39%	3.18%
Hispanic or Latino (any race)	2,024	3,557	4,947	5.51%	8.63%	12.04%
Total	36,706	41,208	41,105	100.00%	100.00%	100.00%

Historical population
Census	Pop.	Note	%±
1880	175		—
1890	263		50.3%
1900	360		36.9%
1910	408		13.3%
1920	371		−9.1%
1930	504		35.8%
1940	608		20.6%
1950	716		17.8%
1960	1,540		115.1%
1970	3,501		127.3%
1980	13,254		278.6%
1990	19,373		46.2%
2000	36,706		89.5%
2010	41,208		12.3%
2020	41,105		−0.2%
U.S. Decennial Census

=== 2020 census ===
As of the 2020 census, Bartlett had a population of 41,105. The median age was 41.1 years. 22.2% of residents were under the age of 18 and 14.7% of residents were 65 years of age or older. For every 100 females there were 96.7 males, and for every 100 females age 18 and over there were 95.3 males age 18 and over. 99.3% of residents lived in urban areas, while 0.7% lived in rural areas.

There were 14,199 households, including 10,867 families. Of all households, 36.6% had children under the age of 18 living in them. 66.8% were married-couple households, 11.4% were households with a male householder and no spouse or partner present, and 17.2% were households with a female householder and no spouse or partner present. About 17.0% of all households were made up of individuals, and 7.9% had someone living alone who was 65 years of age or older.

There were 14,522 housing units at an average density of 912.19 per square mile (352.20/km^{2}). The population density was 2,581.97 inhabitants per square mile (996.90/km^{2}). Of housing units, 2.2% were vacant. The homeowner vacancy rate was 0.9%, and the rental vacancy rate was 4.1%.

=== Income and poverty ===
The median income for a household in the village was $109,980, and the median income for a family was $123,249. Males had a median income of $66,752 versus $42,099 for females. The per capita income for the village was $41,821. About 2.6% of families and 4.2% of the population were below the poverty line, including 5.5% of those under age 18 and 6.0% of those age 65 or over.

=== Demographic estimates ===
In 2011 Bartlett had 5,918 Asian residents, more than twice the number as in 2001. Ashok Selvam of the Daily Herald of Arlington Heights, Illinois said that the Asian population growth "could be traced to construction of the BAPS Shri Swaminarayan Mandir".

== Economy ==
=== Retail and commerce ===
Apart from the downtown area, Bartlett has a large retail area centered by the intersection of Illinois Route 59 and Stearns Road.

== Arts and culture ==
=== Notable features ===
On August 8, 2004, the BAPS organization, a sect of Hinduism, opened BAPS Shri Swaminarayan Mandir, Chicago, a large 22,442-square-foot (2,084.9 m^{2}) temple, or mandir, on Illinois Route 59, just south of U.S. Route 20. Covering 30 acres (120,000 m^{2}), it is the largest traditional Hindu mandir, of stone and marble, to be constructed in the United States. The mandir took 16 months to build and was constructed with Turkish limestone, Italian marble, and Indian makrana marble. The adjoining cultural center, known as the Haveli, was opened in October 2000. The large complex contains large rooms with intricately carved walls of stone and wood. It attracts many visitors of all faiths.

- Bartlett has retained its original railroad station, built in 1873. It is now the home of the Bartlett Depot Museum.
- Bartlett had one of the largest Little League programs in the United States, managed under one board with over 1000 participants in the mid-1990s through early 2010.
- Bartlett has one of the largest individual Little League Challenger Baseball programs (Special Needs Baseball / buddy ball) in the nation.
- In 2013 The Bartlett Little League Challenger Division along with their Little League Illinois District 13 partners were the 15th team ever from Illinois to participate in the Little League World Series. They participated in the Challenger Exhibition game vs California District 57.
- Bartlett's arts council, Arts in Bartlett, presents the village's only juried fine arts fair each year on the last weekend in June.
- Bartlett Park District currently supports the Bartlett Park District Youth Theatre Troupe for ages 8 through 18.

== Sports and recreation ==
The local park district in Bartlett also has a recreation center called Bartlett Community Center. This facility hosts a variety of sports that residents can sign up for and this includes: Adult Softball and Adult Basketball, Youth Basketball, Youth Soccer, Youth Girls Softball, Volleyball, Swimming, and an open gym.

Bartlett is home to Villa Olivia, a year-round resort with special event venue, an 18-hole golf course and winter sports such as skiing, tubing, and snowboarding. The championship course filled with mature trees, rolling hills, and beautiful landscaping. It features 6,510 yards of golf from the longest tees for a par of 73, a course rating of 72.4, and a slope rating of 124. Designed by Richard P. Nugent, ASGCA, the course opened in 1926.

== Government ==
The village of Bartlett has a mayor/council form of government. A village clerk, six trustees and a village president are elected in nonpartisan, at-large elections. They are elected for four-year terms. Elections are staggered, with three trustees elected every two years and the village clerk and president elected every four years. Municipal elections occur in odd-numbered years.

Dan Gunsteen has been Bartlett's Village President since 2025.

== Education ==
=== Schools ===
Public schools in Bartlett schools are entirely within Elgin Area School District U46. The Elgin Area School District serves a 90 square miles (230 km^{2}) area in Cook, DuPage and Kane Counties. Almost 40,000 children of school age are within its boundaries. The Elgin Area School District is the second largest school district in Illinois.

Elgin Area School District schools located in Bartlett include:

- Pre-school: Independence.
- Elementary schools: Bartlett, Centennial, Sycamore Trails, Prairieview, Nature Ridge, and Liberty.
- Middle school: Eastview Middle School. Some students who live in Bartlett attend Kenyon Woods Middle School located in South Elgin.
- High school: Bartlett High School. Many students who live in Bartlett attend South Elgin High School in South Elgin.

Bartlett also has a community preschool.

=== Public library ===
The Bartlett Public Library, which opened in 1973 and has undergone several expansions and renovations, now employs between 100 and 200 staff members across multiple departments, including youth and teen services, reference and adult services, and technical services. The library features a cozy, warm, cabin-like feel due to its exposed wooden structure, and recent renovations in 2015 modernized the space with new study rooms, conference rooms, and an art room, along with an expanded display area in the entrance.

== Lifestyle ==
There is an annual Independence Day festival that takes place located at the corner of W. Stearns and S. Bartlett Road near the Bartlett Community Center, 700 S. Bartlett Road. This festival includes a carnival with rides and games, food, beverages, and many other activities.

== Transportation ==
The village is served by Illinois Route 59 and by the Milwaukee District West rail line. Trains from Bartlett station travel west to Big Timber Road station in Elgin and east to Chicago Union Station.

Pace provides bus service on Route 554 connecting Bartlett to Elgin, Schaumburg, and other destinations.

The village also has a bicycle path, the Barlett Trail, which runs across the village from east to west.

== Notable people ==
- Paul Christiano, choreographer and dancer
- Vinnie Hinostroza, professional hockey player for the Nashville Predators
- Jake Kumerow, professional football player
- Catherine J. Melchert, Mayor 1993–2009
- A. C. Schultz, Wisconsin politician
- Shealeigh Voitl, winner of Radio Disney's The Next Big Thing

== In popular culture ==
- Munger Road (2011)
- Normal Life (1996)
