= Elgin Area School District U46 =

School district in Illinois, United States

Elgin Area School District U-46
- 355 East Chicago St Elgin, Illinois, 60120

District information
- Type: unit school district
- Motto: ACADEMIC SUCCESS FOR ALL
- Grades: K-12
- Established: 1836; 1873 (as Elgin Area District U-1); 1902 (as Elgin Area District U-46)
- Superintendent: Suzanne Johnson
- Chair of the board: Sue Kerr
- Schools: see below
- District ID: 1713710

Students and staff
- Enrollment: 39,000 (total)
- Teachers: 2,426 (FTE)
- Staff: 4,272 (FTE, inc. Teachers)

Other information
- CEO: Suzanna Johnson
- Website: www.u-46.org

Elgin Area School District U46, often referred to as "U-46", is a unit school district headquartered in Elgin, Kane County, Illinois. Covering 90 square miles (230 km^{2}), the district serves portions of eleven communities in the northwest suburbs of Chicago in Cook, DuPage and Kane Counties. School District U-46 serves over 40,000 children in grades preK-12. The district ranks as the second largest in Illinois with forty elementary schools, eight middle schools and five high schools.

Tony Sanders was the CEO until August 2022.

== Special programs ==
- Center House
- Central School Programs
- Dual language program
- DREAM Academy, an alternative school
- High School Academy Program, a program for gifted students in High School
- Preschool Programs
- Radio station WEPS (88.9 FM)
- School Within a School (SWAS) Program, a program for gifted students in 4th-8th Grade; also called Inquiry and Gifted Network for Ingenuity Talent and Exploration (IGNITE) Program
- Planetarium/Observatory

== Schools, alphabetically ==
Name	Website	Principal	Mascot
Abbott Middle School	link	Jennifer Reyes	Warriors
Bartlett Elementary School	Link	John Signatur	Bulldogs
Bartlett High School	link	Timothy Brodeur	Hawks
Canton Middle School	link	Kim Rudden	Cougars
Centennial Elementary School	link	Anthony Crespo	Eagles
Central Schools Programs	link	Tracy Morton
Century Oaks Elementary School	link	Cheryl Frederickson	Tigers
Channing Elementary School	link	Rebecca Lunak	Cheetahs
Clinton Elementary School	link	Lauren McDonald	Cougars
Coleman Elementary School	link	Katherine Stan	Cougars
Creekside Elementary School	link	Dr. Joel Pollack	Cardinals
DREAM Academy	link	Mary Mangione	Phoenix
Eastview Middle School	link	Angela Ginnan	Wolves
Elgin High School	link	Avelira Rodriguez	Maroons
Ellis Middle School	link	Nicholas Baird	Eagles
Fox Meadow Elementary School	Link	Monica Ruzicka-Stout	Foxes
Glenbrook Elementary School	link	Rajan Sharma	Hawks
Harriet Gifford Elementary School	link	Lamie Cedillo	Bears
Heritage Elementary School	Link	Catherine Fletcher	Eagles
Highland Elementary School	link	Anissa Upshaw-Lanotte	Hounds
Hillcrest Elementary School	link	Dr. Glenda Rosado	Huskies
Hilltop Elementary School	link	Kyle Vonschnase	Hawks
Horizon Elementary School	link	Dr. Jennifer Schwardt	Suns
Huff Elementary School	link	Marcella Shelar	Wildcats
Illinois Park Center for Early Learning	link	Apryl Lowe	Huskies
Independence Center for Early Learning	link	Lisa Bergbreiter
Kenyon Woods Middle School	link	Dr. Rebecca Gabrenya	Panthers
Kimball Middle School	link	Charlotte Coleman	Tigers
Larkin High School	link	Jason Misicka	Royals
Larsen Middle School	link	Corey Elton	Lancers
Laurel Hill Elementary School	link	Laura Cardenas	Louie the Lion
Liberty Elementary School	link	Stephanie Sylvester	Lions
Lincoln Elementary School	link	Mayrena Guerrero	Eagles
Lords Park Elementary School	link	Noe Velazquez	Lions
McKinley Elementary School	link	Jeron Shelton	Tigers
Nature Ridge Elementary School	link	Cyndi Aleman	Wolves
Oakhill Elementary School	link	Laura Algeria	Eagles
Ontarioville Elementary School	link	Dr. Elizabeth Ma	Owls
Otter Creek Elementary School	link	David Aleman	Otters
Parkwood Elementary School	Link	Ana Arroyo	Panthers
Prairieview Elementary School	link	Paul Flatley	Panthers
Ridge Circle Elementary School	link	Janelle Raine	Panthers
Ronald D. O’Neal Elementary School	link	Deanna Micaletti	Wildcats
South Elgin High School	link	Jon Miquelon	The Storm
Spring Trail Elementary School	link	Noelle Dupuis	Tigers
Streamwood High School	link	Fernando Luis De León	Sabres
Sunnydale Elementary School	link	Andrea Gaitan	Mustangs
Sycamore Trails Elementary School	link	Jacalyn Jones	Timberwolves
Tefft Middle School	link	Richard Lebron	Trojans
Timber Trails Elementary School	link	Dr. Elisa Biancalana	Tigers
Wayne Elementary School	link	Adam Zurko	Wildcats
Willard Elementary School	link	Dustin Covarrubias	Eagles

== See also ==
- List of school districts in Illinois
