= Mining geology =

Mining geology is an applied science which combines the principles of economic geology and mining engineering to the development of a defined mineral resource. Mining geologists and engineers work to develop an identified ore deposit to economically extract the ore.

== See also ==
- Ore genesis
- Prospecting
- Mineral exploration
  - Exploration geophysics
  - Geochemistry
  - Remote sensing
- Mining
- Industrial mineral
