= Illinois Music Education Association =

The Illinois Music Education Association (ILMEA) is the statewide professional association for music educators in the state of Illinois. It formed in 1941 out of the previous Illinois School Music Association.

ILMEA offers support to Illinois music educators through ongoing professional development opportunities, including the annual Illinois Music Education Conference held in Peoria, Illinois, in conjunction with the student All-State programs.

Students in Illinois audition to perform in an ILMEA ensemble (band, chorus, orchestra, jazz band or vocal jazz ensemble) within one of nine geographic districts. Based on that audition, Senior Level (high school) students may be invited to participate in the annual Illinois All-State Student Programs. There are also opportunities for those students considering careers in music education (Future Music Educators Seminar). The ILMEA Student Composition Competition is one of the largest and most robust of its kind in the country. Open to students in grades 6–12, students may enter original traditional ensemble repertoire, as well as original works in the singer-songwriter, commercial, rap/hip hop and modern band categories as well as arranging categories.
