= South Elgin High School =

Location
- 760 E. Main Street; South Elgin, Illinois 60177; United States; 42°0′3″N 88°17′1″W

Information
- Type: Public secondary
- Motto: "Taking The Future By Storm"
- Established: 2005
- School district: Elgin Area School District U-46
- Superintendent: Dr. Suzanne Johnson
- Principal: Jonathon Miquelon
- Teaching staff: 174.87 (FTE)
- Grades: 9-12
- Enrollment: 2,770 (2023-2024)
- Student to teacher ratio: 15.84
- Campus: Suburban
- Colors: Silver, Red, Navy Blue
- Athletics conference: Upstate Eight
- Mascot: Striker
- Nickname: Storm
- Rival: Bartlett High School
- Newspaper: The Doppler
- Yearbook: The Vortex
- Academy: BEACON (Broadcast Education and Communication Networks)

South Elgin High School or SEHS, opened August 24, 2005, is a four-year high school located in South Elgin, Illinois, a northwest suburb of Chicago, Illinois, in the United States. It is part of Elgin Area School District U46. The school is located on property formerly owned by the Kenyon Brothers Dairy Farms.

== Beacon Academy of Media & Digital Arts ==
The Beacon Academy of Media & Digital Arts is a 4-year program offered to students at South Elgin High School. It has been recognized as a nationally-certified magnet school. The four-year program prepares students to become skillful and successful media makers in the areas of audio and video production, broadcast journalism, webcasting, and web design.

== Student demographics ==
The average class size is 21.3 students (2025). The graduation rate is 89.7%. In 2023, the percent of students enrolling in colleges or universities within 12 months was 67.5%. As of 2025, there were 2,689 students enrolled. 40% of which were White, 30% Hispanic, 10% Asian, 10% Black, 9% Mixed, and 1% of other races.

== Athletics and activities ==
South Elgin High School competes in the Upstate Eight Conference. Its mascot is the Storm, named "Striker". South Elgin has more than 70 different activities are offered to students including athletics, fine arts, and various clubs/organizations. Annually, the school hosts "Taste Under The Lights", a family event which includes football scrimmages, soccer scrimmages, cross-country time-trials, marching band performances, cheer and dance performances, and food trucks. Their rival in such sports is Bartlett High School. The student body is named Storm Nation. The competitive cheerleading team placed 1st in IHSA State Finals in both the 2019–20 and the 2023-24 seasons.

== Notable alumni ==
- Jake Kumerow, NFL wide receiver
- Cale Morris, ice hockey goaltender
- Ryan Weiss, MLB pitcher
