= Naperville High School =

Naperville High School may refer to either of two schools in Naperville, Illinois:

- Naperville Central High School, the original Naperville High School, or officially Naperville Community High School
- Naperville North High School
