= Clow Elementary School =

Location
- 1301 Springdale Cir. Naperville, Illinois 60564; United States
- Coordinates: 41.7174°N 88.174°W

Information
- School type: Public primary
- Opened: 1979
- School district: Indian Prairie SD 204
- Superintendent: Dr. Adrian Talley
- Principal: Katie Bennett
- Staff: 62
- Grades: K–5
- Gender: co-ed
- Enrollment: 368 (2018-19)
- Average class size: 25.1
- Campus: suburban
- Mascot: Cougars
- Website: http://clow.ipsd.org

Clow Elementary School is an elementary school located on Springdale Circle in Naperville, Illinois, a western Suburb of Chicago, Illinois in DuPage County. Clow Elementary School is one of the twenty-one elementary schools that Indian Prairie School District 204 manages.

== About ==
The school opened in the year 1979 and along with the Thayer J. Hill Middle School was one of the first schools constructed following the creation of the district and the building of Waubonsie Valley High School. The school serves Indian Prairie School District 204.

The namesake of the school, Robert E. Clow, was the School Board President of District 40. Mr. Clow was a member of a prominent family who owned and operated farms in the region.

== Construction and building ==
In 1979, when it started, Clow was located in a rural portion of Naperville. Although when the school was opened roads had been constructed leading to it, there were no houses. Volunteers from the neighborhood joined school personnel in landscaping the grounds, with the board members joining in to spend their weekends digging holes and planting bushes and trees.

The walls of the library media center in the school has a large mural painted by a parent in 2013 featuring a boy riding a dragon.

== Academics ==
The school has maintained high levels of proficiency in English language and arts, math, and science, significantly above the district and state levels. The school is placed in the top five percent in Illinois in terms of overall test scores in math and reading proficiency.
