= Hill Middle School =

Hill Middle School may refer to:

- David Lee “Tex“ Hill Middle School of North East Independent School District in San Antonio, Texas
- Thayer J. Hill Middle School of Indian Prairie School District 204 in Naperville, Illinois
- Hill Middle School in the Long Beach Unified School District in California.
- Hill Middle School in the Novato Unified School District in Novato, California
