= Mark Pearson (journalist) =

American journalist

Mark Pearson as he appeared on Iowa Public Television in 1997.

Mark Robert Pearson (September 8, 1957 – June 3, 2012) was an American television and radio personality specializing in agriculture-related journalism. He was host of Iowa Public Television's syndicated television show Market to Market and co-host of a program about agricultural news on 50,000 watt clear channel radio station WHO-AM. He also anchored Iowa Public Television's Iowa State Fair coverage for more than 10 years, taking over for Bill Riley.

== Biography ==
=== Early years ===
Mark Robert Person was born September 8, 1957, in Lafayette, Indiana, the son of June and Robert Pearson. The family subsequently moved to Naperville, Illinois, where Pearson attended public schools, graduating from Naperville Central High School in 1975. Pearson then enrolled at the University of Arizona in Tucson, Arizona, as a journalism major, graduating there in 1979.

=== Career ===
After meeting his wife and marrying during his college years, Pearson returned to the Midwest, taking a position with Des Moines, Iowa, radio station WHO-AM, where he worked in the station's farm department. Pearson would become a specialist in agricultural journalism and would soon earn the top honor in the field, receiving the DeKalb Oscar in 1980.

Pearson also worked in print journalism as the markets editor for Successful Farming magazine. Pearson served for a time during the early 1980s as assistant secretary of the Iowa Department of Agriculture.

In 1985, Pearson left Iowa to take a position as Director of Agricultural Programming for Minnesota Public Radio, coordinating farm programing to a group of about fifty stations in Minnesota and Iowa. He also entered the United States Naval Reserves the following year, working as a Military Intelligence officer, eventually attaining the rank of lieutenant commander.

Pearson returned to Iowa in 1988, buying a small farm at Thayer and taking a position as Director of Agricultural Planning and Development at Southwestern Community College in Creston, where he worked with farmers of the region helping to improve their agricultural operations.

In 1991, Pearson took over as host of Iowa Public Television's Market to Market program, a popular syndicated series. He would also anchor IPT's coverage of the Iowa State Fair for more than a decade, taking over for Bill Riley, and would work as a public speaker, delivering talks to a wide range of organizations on agricultural themes.

Pearson and his family moved to East Peru, Iowa, in 1995, where they began a new grain and livestock farm, which grew into a substantial operation. Pearson would remain a resident of East Peru for the rest of his life.

=== Death and legacy ===
Mark Pearson died June 2, 2012, at a farm in rural Madison County, Iowa, the victim of an apparent heart attack. He was 54 years old at the time of his death.

In July 2012, Iowa Public television chose Mark Pearson's son, Mike Pearson, manager of the family farm and himself a reporter for Iowa Public Radio Station WOI-AM as the new host of the Market to Market program.
