= Indian Prairie School District 204 =

School district in Illinois, United States

Indian Prairie School District 204 IPSD 204

Address
- 780 Shoreline Drive Aurora, Illinois, 60504; United States

District information
- Grades: PreK-12
- Established: 1972
- Superintendent: Dr. John P. Price
- Schools: 34
- Budget: $394 Million
- NCES District ID: 1741690

Students and staff
- Students: 27,400
- Faculty: 3,130

Other information
- Website: https://www.ipsd.org/

Indian Prairie School District 204 (abbreviated IPSD) serves roughly 26,000 students from the Illinois communities of Aurora, Bolingbrook, Plainfield and Naperville, in DuPage and Will counties. Currently, one preschool, twenty one elementary schools, seven middle schools, three high schools, and one alternative high school are in the district. There are thirty-one District 204 schools in Naperville and Aurora and one in Bolingbrook.

== History ==
The district was formed in 1972 by the mergers of Wheatland Elementary District 40, Elementary District 90 (which included Granger and Longwood Elementary Schools) and Indian Plains Elementary District 182. The district began as a Kindergarten-8th Grade (K-8) district, with its students attending Naperville Central High School for 9th Grade-12th Grade until Waubonsie Valley High School was constructed for District 204 and opened in 1975. The district opened eleven buildings during the 1990s, at all levels of primary and secondary education. Neuqua Valley High School was introduced to the district in 1997. Another two elementary buildings were opened in 2001-2002, another in 2007, and a third traditional high school, Metea Valley High School, opened in 2009, to relieve overpopulation of Neuqua Valley High School and Waubonsie Valley High School.

== Preschools ==
School's name	School's namesake	Location	Mascot	Principal	Year Opened
Prairie Children's Preschool		Aurora		Sally Osborne	1998

== Elementary schools ==
School's name	School's namesake	Location	Mascot	Principal	Year Opened
Brookdale Elementary School	Brookdale subdivision	Naperville	Bobcats	Keely Schmid	1985
Brooks Elementary School	Gwendolyn Brooks	Aurora	Tigers	Terri Russell	1995
Builta Elementary School	Wayne Builta, former teacher at Waubonsie Valley	Bolingbrook	Badgers	Adrienne Morgan	1999
Clow Elementary School	Robert E. Clow, school board president	Naperville	Cougars	Katie Bennett	1979
Cowlishaw Elementary School	Mary Lou Cowlishaw, retired member of the Illinois General Assembly	Naperville	Koalas	Carlos Azcoitia	1997
Fry Elementary School	Fry family, longtime residents of Will County, Illinois	Naperville	Foxes	Laurel Hillman	2001
Georgetown Elementary School	Georgetown subdivision	Aurora	Hawks	Jill Keller	1986
Gombert Elementary School	Peter M. Gombert, former Associate Superintendent for Business	Aurora	Gators	Jeremy Ricken	1998
Graham Elementary School	V. Blanche Graham, former teacher and principal	Naperville	Falcons	Claudette Walton	1996
Kendall Elementary School	Oliver Julian Kendall, World War I casualty from Naperville	Naperville	Patriots	Breah Jerger	1998
Longwood Elementary School	Longwood subdivision	Naperville	Lions	Tracey Rattner	1967
McCarty Elementary School	McCarty Brothers (Founders of Aurora)	Aurora	Mustangs	Kevin Schnable	1989
Owen Elementary School	Owen Wavrinek, former School Board President	Naperville	Owls	Heather Whisler	2002
Patterson Elementary School	Patterson family, early settlers of Wheatland Township, Will County, Illinois.	Naperville	Prairie Dogs	Michele Frost	1993
Peterson Elementary School	Danielle Joy Peterson, a district graduate and former employee, now deceased	Naperville	Panthers	Allison Landstrom	2007
Spring Brook Elementary School	Spring Brook subdivision	Naperville	Huskies	David Worst	1990
Steck Elementary School	Reba O. Steck, former teacher	Aurora	Eagles	Elizabeth Pohlmann	1992
May Watts Elementary School	May Watts, environmental conservationist	Naperville	Wolverines	Brian LeCrone	1989
Welch Elementary School	Arlene Welch, former teacher	Naperville	White Tigers	Sarah Nowak	1999
White Eagle Elementary School	White Eagle subdivision	Naperville	Wolves	Mary Howicz	1995
Young Elementary School	Nancy Young, former librarian	Aurora	Dolphins	Erin Rodriguez	1999

== Middle schools ==
School's name	School's namesake	Location	Mascot	Principal	Year opened	
Crone Middle School	Clifford Crone, former superintendent	Naperville (originally in Neuqua Valley's current gold campus)	Panthers	Melissa Couch	1997 (original)	2003 (new)
Fischer Middle School	Gregory Fischer, Educator	Aurora (in the converted Gold Campus of Waubonsie and before that, Granger Middle School)	Falcons	Kevin Schnable	2009	
Granger Middle School	Francis Granger, early resident of DuPage County, Illinois	Aurora (originally located where Fischer Middle School is located today)	Grizzlies	Allan Davenport	1993 (original)	2003 (new)
Gregory Middle School	Gordon Arthur Gregory, former school board president	Naperville	Pioneers	Leslie Mitchell	1987	
Hill Middle School	Thayer J. Hill, first superintendent of IPSD 204.	Naperville	Trailblazers	Michael Dutdut	1981	
Scullen Middle School	Thomas G. Scullen, former superintendent	Naperville	Sharks	Scott Loughrige	2001	
Still Middle School	Jeffrey C. Still, former teacher at Waubonsie Valley and Granger	Aurora	Bulldogs	Kimberly Cornish	1999	

== High schools ==
School's name	School's namesake	Location	Mascot and Colors	Principal	Year opened
Gail McKinzie High School	Gail McKinzie, former superintendent of IPSD 204	Naperville	Hawks Green and Blue	LaTanya Harris	2019
Waubonsie Valley High School	Waubonsie, chief of the Des Plaines and Fox River Potawatomi	Aurora	Warriors Green and Gold	Jason Stipp	1975
Neuqua Valley High School	Neuqua, son of Waubonsie	Naperville	Wildcats Blue and Gold	Lance Fuhrer	1997
Metea Valley High School	Metea, chief of the Fort Wayne Potawatomi	Aurora	Mustangs Black and Gold	Daniel DeBruycker	2009

== Student demographics ==
Ethnic Distribution
White	Asian	Indian	Hispanic	Black	Multi- Racial	American- Indian	Pacific Islander
40%	33%	38%	12%	17%	5%	0%	0%

Other
Low Income	With Disabilities	English Learners	Homeless
16%	12%	11%	1%

== School board ==
The Indian Prairie School District Board of Education consists of 7 members, each elected for a four-year term. Board members volunteer their time and are a combination of District 204 parents and residents. The Board's major function is to establish educational policies, goals, and objectives for the District. The Board's mission is to inspire all students to achieve their greatest potential.

Current School Board
Member	Biography	Term Expiration
Laurie Donahue (President)	Professionally, Donahue is a retired senior director in the telecom industry with over 35 years of experience. She obtained her Bachelor's in Computer Engineering from the University of Michigan and an MBA from Benedictine University. Donahue has resided in Naperville, IL for over 40 years. Her children also attended schools within the District.	2025
Mark Rising (Vice President)	Professionally, Rising has over 20-years experience in IT consulting, sales management, and sales and account management in healthcare and legal technology fields. He has also been an active member of school and district parent organizations, such as the Indian Prairie Parents' Council and various PTAs. Rising obtained a Bachelor's degree in communications and marketing from University of Wisconsin- Whitewater. He has been a district resident since 1998 and currently lives in Aurora, IL.	2023
Susan Demming (Secretary)	Professionally, Demming has experience as a marketing and workforce development consultant, corporate marketing executive, and entrepreneur. She has also been an active member of the District 204 community, holding PTA positions and serving on the Districts' Citizens Communications Advisory Committee. She obtained her Bachelor's degree from Rice University and an MBA in Marketing and Management from Columbia University.	2025
Allison Fosdick	Professionally, Fosdick is an adjunct professor at Aurora University. She has also been an active community member, serving in many leadership roles, including president of the Spring Brook Elementary School PTA and vice president of the Orchestra Parents Association at Neuqua Valley High School. She obtained her Bachelor's degree from Miami University and her MA from Northern Illinois University. Additionally, she has been a resident of Naperville for over 25 years.	2025
Natasha Grover	Professionally, Grover has experience as an attorney advisor for the Social Security Administration and as an attorney for the Department of Children & Family Services and Immigrant Law Center. She currently has children attending schools within the District and one who recently graduated. She has also been an engaged District 204 volunteer. Grover obtained her Bachelor's degree from George Washington University and her law degree from American University Washington College of Law.	2023
Supna Jain	Professionally, Jain is a Senior Lecturer in Communication and Director of the Speaking Center at North Central College. She has been an active participant of various PTAs and on the District's Parent Diversity Advisory Council. She obtained her Bachelor's degree in Political Science and Communication from University of Illinois Urbana-Champaign, her MS in Communication from Illinois State University, and her law degree from DePaul University. Additionally, she has been a district resident for over 10 years.	2025
Justin Karubas	Professionally, Karubas is an attorney at the Wheaton law firm of Rolewick & Gutzke. He has also been an active community member, serving as Director of the Indian Prairie Educational Foundation, and member of the District's Donor Development Committee and At-Risk Committee. He has been a lifelong District 204 resident.	2023
