= Steve Keller =

American soccer player

Personal information
- Date of birth: May 5, 1972 (age 54)
- Place of birth: Naperville, Illinois, U.S.
- Height: 5 ft 11 in (1.80 m)
- Position: Midfielder

College career
Years	Team	Apps	(Gls)
1991–1994	Indiana Hoosiers		

Senior career*
Years	Team	Apps	(Gls)
1995–1996	Rockford Raptors		
1996–1997	Milwaukee Wave (indoor)	9	(0)

Managerial career
- 1998–: Fremd High School
- * Club domestic league appearances and goals

Steve Keller is an American retired soccer midfielder who spent two seasons in the USISL and one in the National Professional Soccer League.

In 1990, Keller, older brother of national team player Debbie Keller, graduated from Waubonsie Valley High School where he was a 1989 All Conference basketball player, a 1988 and 1989 All State soccer player and a 1989 All Midwest soccer player. He is a member of the WVHS Hall of Fame. He attended Indiana University, playing on the men's soccer team from 1991 to 1994. In 1994, Keller and his teammates fell to the Virginia Cavaliers in the final of the NCAA Division I Men's Soccer Championship.

In 1995, Keller turned professional with the Rockford Raptors of the USISL. In February 1996, the Dallas Burn selected Keller in the fourteenth round (133rd overall) of the 1996 MLS Inaugural Player Draft. The Burn released him during the pre-season and Keller returned to the Raptors for the 1996 season. In October 1996, he signed as a free agent with the Milwaukee Wave of the National Professional Soccer League. In 1998, he became the head coach of the Fremd High School boys' team.
