= East Peru, Iowa =

- City
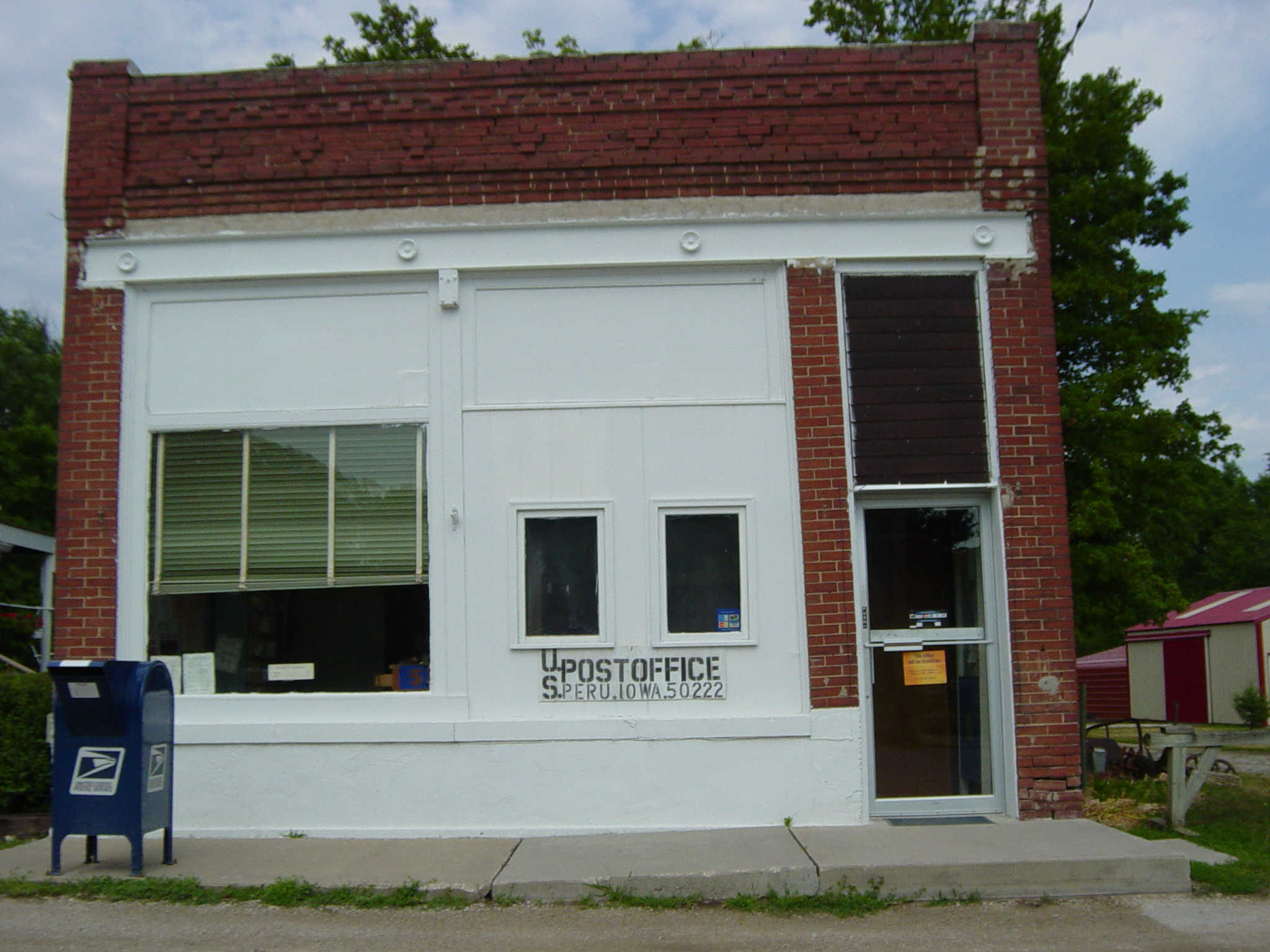
- Post office in East Peru

- Location of East Peru, Iowa
- Coordinates: 41°13′37″N 93°55′46″W
- Country: United States
- State: Iowa
- County: Madison

Area
  - Total: 0.94 sq mi (2.43 km^{2})
  - Land: 0.94 sq mi (2.43 km^{2})
  - Water: 0 sq mi (0.00 km^{2})
- Elevation: 1,011 ft (308 m)

Population (2020)
  - Total: 115
  - Density: 122.8/sq mi (47.42/km^{2})
- Time zone: UTC-6 (Central (CST))
  - Summer (DST): UTC-5 (CDT)
- ZIP code: 50222
- FIPS code: 19-23790
- GNIS feature ID: 2394605
- Website: www.eastperuia.org

East Peru (Note: /ˈpiːruː/) is a city in Madison County, Iowa, United States. The population was 115 at the time of the 2020 census. It is part of the Des Moines–West Des Moines Metropolitan Statistical Area.

== History ==
East Peru had its start in the year 1887 by the building of the railroad through that territory.

== Geography ==
According to the United States Census Bureau, the city has a total area of 0.94 square miles (2.43 km^{2}), all of it land.

East Peru is the birthplace of the Red Delicious cultivar of apple.

== Demographics ==
Historical populations
Year	Pop.	±%
1900	252	—
1910	371	+47.2%
1920	253	−31.8%
1930	304	+20.2%
1940	267	−12.2%
1950	204	−23.6%
1960	173	−15.2%
1970	184	+6.4%
1980	124	−32.6%
1990	132	+6.5%
2000	153	+15.9%
2010	125	−18.3%
2020	115	−8.0%
Source:"U.S. Census website". United States Census Bureau. and Iowa Data Center; Source: U.S. Decennial Census

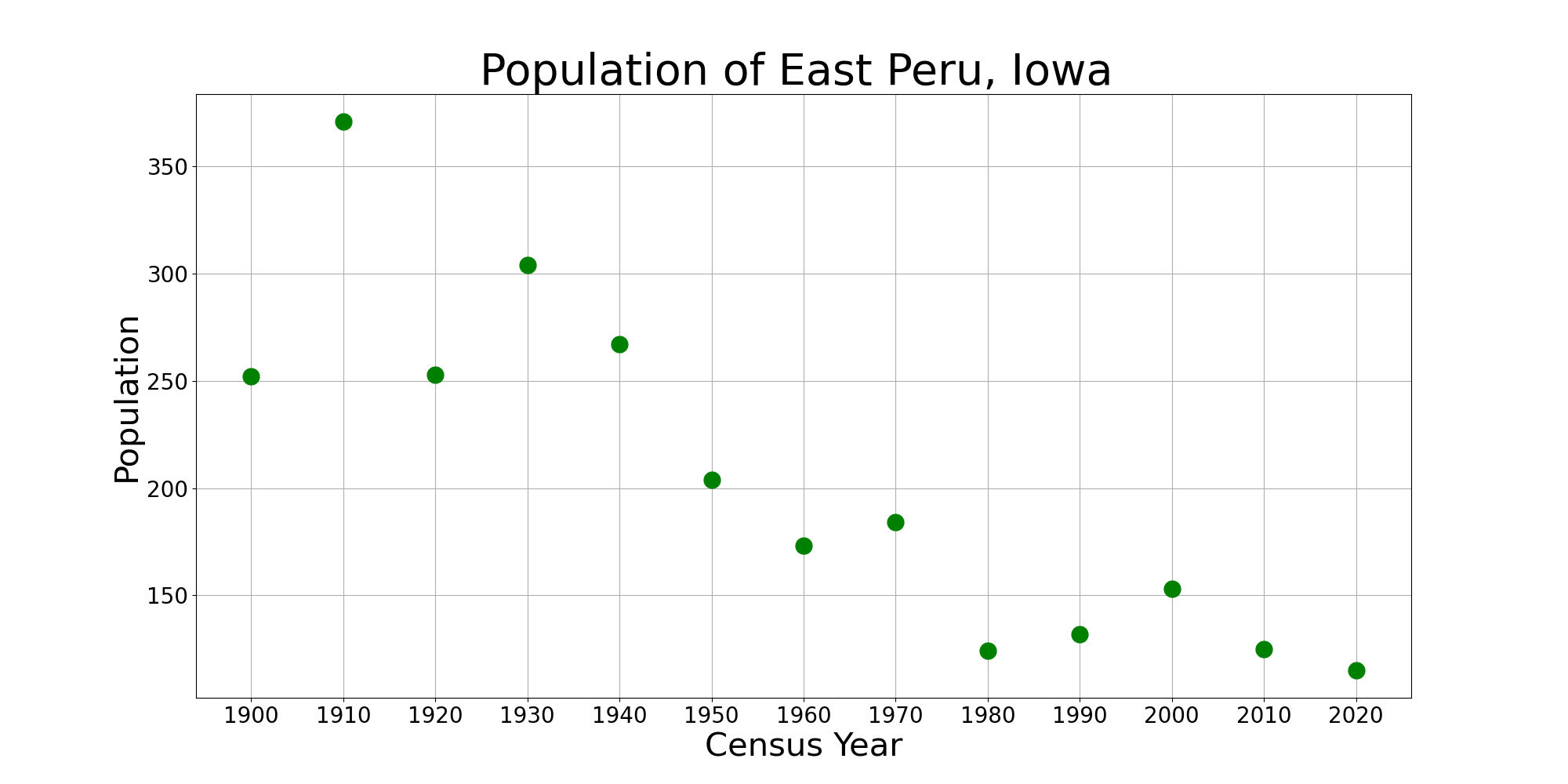
The population of East Peru, Iowa from US census data

=== 2020 census ===
As of the census of 2020, there were 115 people, 46 households, and 31 families residing in the city. The population density was 122.8 inhabitants per square mile (47.4/km^{2}). There were 48 housing units at an average density of 51.3 per square mile (19.8/km^{2}). The racial makeup of the city was 94.8% White, 0.9% Black or African American, 0.0% Native American, 0.0% Asian, 0.0% Pacific Islander, 0.9% from other races and 3.5% from two or more races. Hispanic or Latino persons of any race comprised 2.6% of the population.

Of the 46 households, 26.1% of which had children under the age of 18 living with them, 54.3% were married couples living together, 0.0% were cohabitating couples, 28.3% had a female householder with no spouse or partner present and 17.4% had a male householder with no spouse or partner present. 32.6% of all households were non-families. 30.4% of all households were made up of individuals, 6.5% had someone living alone who was 65 years old or older.

The median age in the city was 41.3 years. 24.3% of the residents were under the age of 20; 9.6% were between the ages of 20 and 24; 22.6% were from 25 and 44; 21.7% were from 45 and 64; and 21.7% were 65 years of age or older. The gender makeup of the city was 53.0% male and 47.0% female.

=== 2010 census ===
As of the census of 2010, there were 125 people, 47 households, and 38 families residing in the city. The population density was 133.0 inhabitants per square mile (51.4/km^{2}). There were 51 housing units at an average density of 54.3 per square mile (21.0/km^{2}). The racial makeup of the city was 100.0% White.

There were 47 households, of which 29.8% had children under the age of 18 living with them, 66.0% were married couples living together, 12.8% had a female householder with no husband present, 2.1% had a male householder with no wife present, and 19.1% were non-families. 12.8% of all households were made up of individuals, and 4.3% had someone living alone who was 65 years of age or older. The average household size was 2.66 and the average family size was 2.92.

The median age in the city was 45.5 years. 27.2% of residents were under the age of 18; 1.6% were between the ages of 18 and 24; 20.8% were from 25 to 44; 32% were from 45 to 64; and 18.4% were 65 years of age or older. The gender makeup of the city was 50.4% male and 49.6% female.

=== 2000 census ===
As of the census of 2000, there were 153 people, 53 households, and 46 families residing in the city. The population density was 163.3 inhabitants per square mile (63.1/km^{2}). There were 58 housing units at an average density of 61.9 per square mile (23.9/km^{2}). The racial makeup of the city was 95.42% White, 0.65% Native American, and 3.92% from two or more races. Hispanic or Latino of any race were 3.92% of the population.

There were 53 households, out of which 35.8% had children under the age of 18 living with them, 75.5% were married couples living together, 7.5% had a female householder with no husband present, and 13.2% were non-families. 11.3% of all households were made up of individuals, and 3.8% had someone living alone who was 65 years of age or older. The average household size was 2.89 and the average family size was 3.09.

In the city, the population was spread out, with 30.1% under the age of 18, 5.9% from 18 to 24, 26.8% from 25 to 44, 24.2% from 45 to 64, and 13.1% who were 65 years of age or older. The median age was 34 years. For every 100 females, there were 112.5 males. For every 100 females age 18 and over, there were 109.8 males.

The median income for a household in the city was $32,083, and the median income for a family was $32,083. Males had a median income of $35,000 versus $20,750 for females. The per capita income for the city was $14,756. About 13.3% of families and 19.1% of the population were below the poverty line, including 37.5% of those under the age of eighteen and 10.0% of those 65 or over.

== Government ==
East Peru is administered by a mayor and council. The mayor was Chris Jordan as of 2007.

== Education ==
The Winterset Community School District operates local public schools.

== Notable residents ==
- Mark Pearson (1957-2012), agricultural journalist and television personality, resident of East Peru from 1995 until his death
