= DuPage Valley Conference =

US high school athletic conference

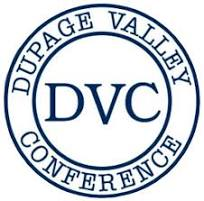
- Official logo of the DuPage Valley Conference
- Conference: IHSA
- Founded: 1975
- Sports fielded: 22 (11 boys', 11 girls') 4 activities
- No. of teams: 6
- Region: Western suburbs of Chicago, Illinois

The DuPage Valley Conference (DVC) is an organization of six high schools in northeastern Illinois, representing seven communities in Chicago's suburbs. These high schools are all members of the Illinois High School Association. The Conference, organized in 1975, exists primarily for inter-school athletic competition in 21 sports. There are also four non-athletic competitions in which DVC schools participate: Chess, Math competitions, Scholastic Bowl and Speech.

Four of the six current conference member schools are within DuPage County, Illinois. One school, Neuqua Valley High School, is located just to the south of Du Page in Will County, Illinois while DeKalb High School is located west of the other schools in DeKalb County, Illinois. The conference derives its name from the DuPage River, which flows through two of the seven represented communities (although students from towns on the DuPage River do attend more of the member schools, due to attendance boundaries).

Locations of DuPage Valley Schools

== History ==
The DuPage Valley Conference was formed prior to the 1975–76 school year. Its charter members were Glenbard North High School, Glenbard South High School, Naperville Central High School, Naperville North High School, West Chicago Community High School, Wheaton Central High School, Wheaton North High School, and Wheaton Warrenville High School. While the conference has typically kept a constant membership of at least six high schools, the actual membership of the Conference has changed since its founding. The conference experienced the first membership change in 1983, when Glenbard East High School left the Des Plaines Valley League and joined the DVC, replacing Wheaton-Warrenville High School, which was closed due to low attendance. The next change came in 1992, when Wheaton Central High School and Wheaton-Warrenville Middle School changed buildings. The high school (now in the former Wheaton-Warrenville high school building) became known as Wheaton-Warrenville South High School in order to distinguish it from the closed Wheaton-Warrenville; the middle school (in the old Wheaton Central building from 1992-2009) became Hubble Middle School. After the 1996 school year, Glenbard South High School left the DuPage Valley Conference, citing an inability to be competitive with the larger member schools in the league (despite winning a share of the conference title in softball in their final year in the conference). The DuPage Valley Conference operated for one year with only seven schools before admitting former Upstate Eight Conference member West Aurora High School in Aurora, Illinois, the first DVC school outside DuPage County. The move reunited West Aurora with former Upstate Eight charter members Naperville Central, and Wheaton-Warrenville South who were then known as Naperville Community, and Wheaton Community in 1963.

Effective at the start of the 2013-14 conference season, West Chicago Community High School left the DuPage Valley Conference and joined the Upstate Eight Conference (Valley Division). At the same time Lake Park High School took the vacant space after leaving the Upstate Eight Conference Valley Division.

Following suit with West Chicago Community High School, Glenbard East High School and West Aurora High School expressed interest in joining the Upstate Eight Conference. The two schools voted unanimously to accept the invitation to the Upstate Eight Conference starting in the 2014–2015 season. This effectively left the DVC as a 6 member high school conference. Glenbard North High School declined an invite from the Upstate Eight Conference to join.

Prior to the 2015–2016 school year, Metea Valley High School, Neuqua Valley High School, and Waubonsie Valley High School, all formerly of the Upstate Eight Conference Valley Division, accepted an invitation to join the DuPage Valley Conference, bringing the membership to 9 schools.

In late 2016, four members of the DVC, Glenbard North High School, Lake Park High School, Wheaton North High School, and Wheaton Warrenville South High School announced that they would be leaving the conference effective at the end of the 2017–18 school year to form a new athletic conference with current Upstate Eight (River Division) members Batavia High School, Geneva High School, St. Charles East High School, and St. Charles North High School. The conference is now known as the DuKane Conference.

The remaining DVC members Metea Valley, Naperville Central, Naperville North, Neuqua Valley, and Waubonsie Valley continued athletic competition in the DVC despite scheduling concerns, particularly for football.

DeKalb High School accepted an invitation to join the DVC for the 2019-2020 season following the break-up of the Northern Illinois Big 12 Conference.

In 2024–25, the DVC merged with Southwest Suburban Conference called "Southwest Valley Conference" for football only. The conference would create into 3 divisions, one consisting of 5 schools:

- Blue Division: Homewood-Flossomoor, Lincoln-Way East, Lockport, Naperville North and Neuqua Valley
- Red Division: Andrew, Lincoln-Way West, Metea Valley, Naperville Central and Sandburg
- Green Division: Bradley-Bourbonnais, DeKalb, Lincoln-Way Central, Stagg and Waubonsie Valley

In 2025–26, the Southwest Valley Conference eliminate green division into 2 divisions:

- Blue Division: Homewood-Flossomoor, Lincoln-Way East, Lockport, Naperville Central, Naperville North, Neuqua Valley, Metea Valley and Sandburg
- Red Division: Andrew, Bradley-Borbonnais, DeKalb, Lincoln-Way Central, Lincoln-Way West, Stagg and Waubonsie Valley

In 2026–27, the Southwest Valley Conference dissolved when schools returned to their standalone conferences.

== Current members ==
School	Town	Area	Township Area	Team Name	Colors	IHSA Classes (2/3/4)	Reference
DeKalb High School	DeKalb	Northeast Illinois	Chicagoland	Barbs		AA/3A/4A	
Metea Valley High School	Aurora	Western Suburbs	Chicagoland	Mustangs		AA/3A/4A	
Naperville Central High School	Naperville	Western Suburbs	Chicagoland	Redhawks		AA/3A/4A	
Naperville North High School	Naperville	Western Suburbs	Chicagoland	Huskies		AA/3A/4A	
Neuqua Valley High School	Naperville	Western Suburbs	Chicagoland	Wildcats		AA/3A/4A	
Waubonsie Valley High School	Aurora	Western Suburbs	Chicagoland	Warriors		AA/3A/4A	

== Membership timeline ==
Beginning in 1975, the DuPage Valley Conference competes in 11 boys, 13 girls and 13 coed sports and activities within the IHSA.

DuPage Valley Conference full members

== State titles ==
The conference as a whole, since its founding in 1975, has won 60 IHSA state titles in sports and activities sponsored by the conference.

- Baseball: Naperville Central (2005–06, 2009-2010)
- Basketball (boys): West Aurora (1999–2000)
- Basketball (girls): Naperville Central (2002–03, 03–04)
- Bowling (girls): Waubonsie Valley (2012–13, 13–14)
- Chess: Naperville North (2003–04); West Chicago (1995–96)
- Competitive Dance: Naperville North (2018–19); Neuqua Valley (2014–15); Lake Park (2013-14)
- Cross Country (boys): Naperville North (2008–09)
- Cross Country (girls): Glenbard North (1994–95); Wheaton North (2002–03); Naperville North (1993–94)(2001–02)(2004–05,05-05)(2012–13)(2014–15)(2016–17,17-18) (
- Football: Naperville Central (1999–2000, 2013–14); Naperville North (1992–93, 2007–08); Wheaton North (1979–80, 81–82, 86–87); Wheaton Warrenville South (1992–93, 95–96, 96–97, 98–99, 2006–07, 09–10, 10-11)
- Golf (girls): Wheaton Warrenville South (2016–17)
- Golf (boys): Naperville North (1989–90, 94–95)
- Gymnastics (boys): Glenbard North (1991–92); Naperville North (2000–01); Wheaton North/Warrenville South coop (2004–05, 2011–12)
- Gymnastics (girls): Glenbard North (1981–82, 82–83); Naperville North (1993–94, 2001–02, 04–05, 05–06)
- Scholastic Bowl: Wheaton North (2001–02, 02–03, 03–04)
- Soccer (boys): Naperville North (1998–99)
- Soccer (girls): Naperville North (1987–88); Waubonsie Valley (2006–07, 07–08, 09-10)
- Swimming & Diving (boys): Naperville Central (2001–02, 09–10); Naperville North (1995–96)
- Swimming & Diving (girls): Naperville Central (2004–05, 05–06)
- Tennis (boys): Naperville North (1993–94) Naperville Central (2016–17)
- Tennis (girls): Naperville Central (1993–94); West Aurora (1996–97, 97–98)
- Track & Field (boys): Wheaton Warrenville South (1995–96, 98–99)
- Volleyball (boys): Naperville Central (1997–98); Naperville North (1996–97); Wheaton Warrenville South (2000–01, 03–04, 04–05, 06–07, 07–08, 08–09, 11-12)
- Volleyball (girls): Metea Valley (2021) Naperville Central (2005–06, 07–08)
- Water Polo (boys): Naperville Central (2015–16)
- Wrestling (boys): Glenbard North (2010–11)
