= Community High School (West Chicago) =

West Chicago Community High School
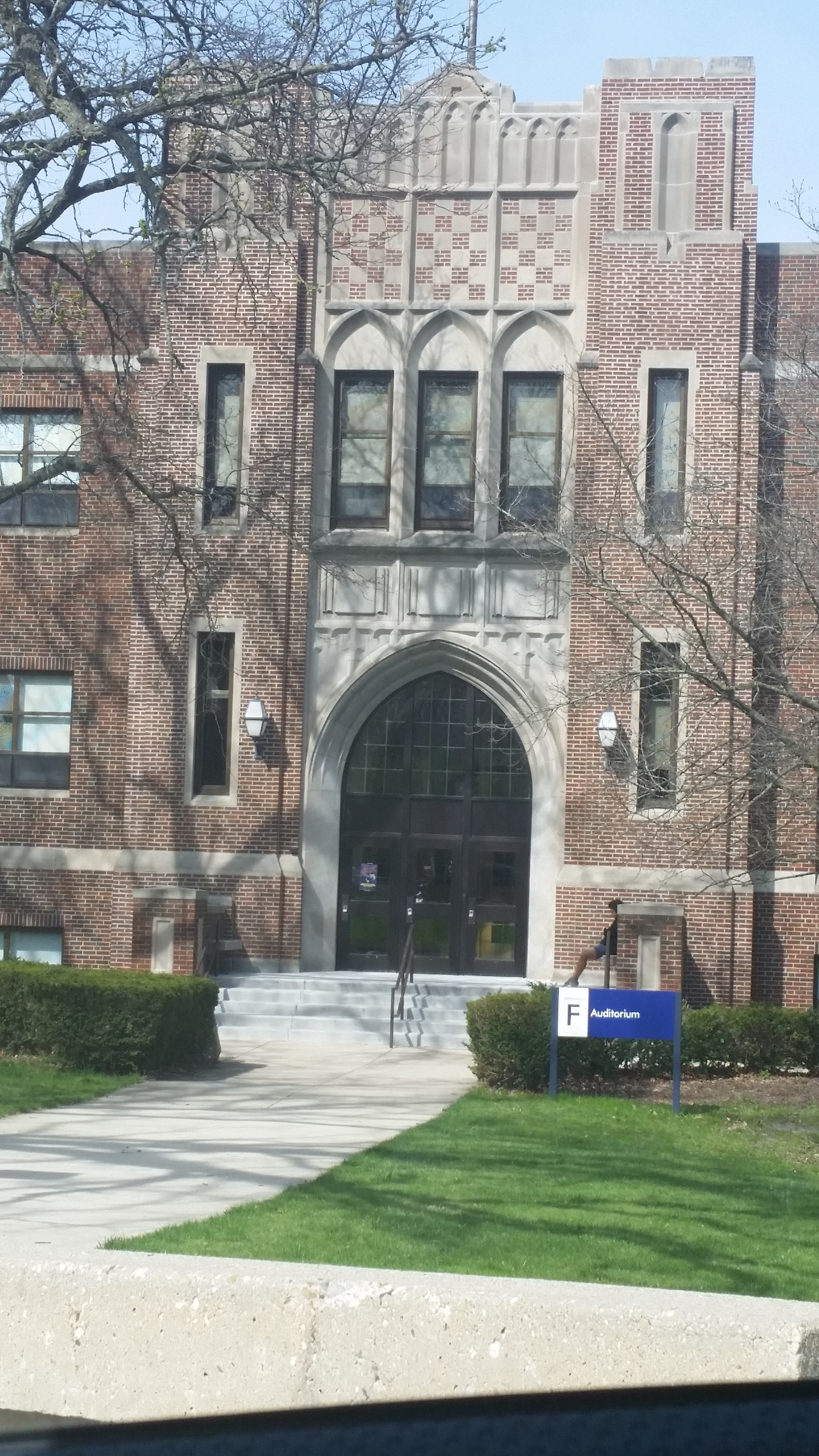
- Original entrance to the Community High School building

Location
- 326 Joliet St. West Chicago, Illinois 60185; United States; 41°52′46″N 88°12′23″W

Information
- School type: public secondary
- Opened: 1926; 100 years ago
- School district: Community HS Dist. 94
- Superintendent: Kurt Johansen
- Principal: Limaris Pueyo
- Teaching staff: 138.65 (FTE)
- Grades: 9–12
- Gender: coed
- Enrollment: 2,040 (2024-2025)
- Average class size: 25.89
- Student to teacher ratio: 14.71
- Campus: suburban
- Colours: navy blue white
- Fight song: We're West Chicago, Brave and Bold
- Athletics conference: Upstate Eight Conference beginning 2013-2014 year
- Nickname: Wildcats
- Publication: Mind's Eye
- Newspaper: Wildcat Chronicle
- Yearbook: Challenge
- Website: www.d94.org

Community High School, also known as West Chicago Community High School, WCCHS, or simply WE-GO, is a public four-year high school located in West Chicago, Illinois, a western suburb of Chicago, Illinois, in the United States. It is the sole school in the Community High School District 94.

== History ==
From 1904 to 1926, the old junior high school (since torn down and now the present location of the West Chicago Fire Department) and various buildings in the city of West Chicago were used as high school classrooms. On December 28, 1924, the citizens voted to construct a high school at the present site.

The opening date of the new high school was September 23, 1926. The 21st annual commencement (the first at the new high school) was held on June 11, 1927. The graduating class consisted of 27 students (20 girls and 7 boys).

In 1954, Community High School experienced its first addition to the building. That addition is the area that now includes the cafeteria, small gym, and some classroom facilities. In 1964 another major addition was approved by the Board of Education. This area includes the Bishop Gymnasium and all of the new classroom facilities in the northern part of the building. In 1978 additions were added to the north and south ends of the building providing a swimming pool, fieldhouse, greenhouses, library, commons, and administrative offices. In the summer of 1998 ground was broken for the addition of twenty-eight classrooms, a fitness center and dance studio, and the construction of a new sports stadium. The new classrooms, fitness center and dance studio are located on the west side of the building. In addition to new construction, the building referendum passed in 1997 included monies for the installation of new heating, ventilation, plumbing and air conditioning systems for the remaining parts of the building.

The referendum allocated 1.8 million dollars for technology. Technology has been integrated into all classrooms in the school. The high school now has 12 fully equipped computer labs, an Online College and Career Center, a Yearbook Production Lab, and laptop computers.

== Academics ==
In 2008, West Chicago had an average composite ACT score of 20.4 and graduated 96.1% of its senior class. West Chicago has not made Adequate Yearly Progress (AYP) on the Prairie State Achievement Examination, which with the ACT comprise the assessment tools used in Illinois to fulfill the federal No Child Left Behind Act. Four of the school's five student subgroups did not meet minimum expectations in reading, while three did not meet minimum expectations in mathematics.

== Athletics ==
As of the 2013-14 school year, West Chicago will compete in the Upstate Eight Conference (UEC or U8C) and is a member of the Illinois High School Association (IHSA), which governs most interscholastic sports and competitive activities in Illinois. West Chicago formerly competed in the DuPage Valley Conference (DVC), where it was one of the smallest schools. The change in conference was motivated to move to a conference of schools closer in enrollment.

West Chicago's teams are stylized as the Wildcats.

The Athletic Department sponsors interscholastic teams for young men and women in basketball, cross country, cheerleading, golf, soccer, swimming & diving, tennis, track & field, volleyball and, wrestling. Young men may also compete in baseball, and football, while young women may compete in badminton, and softball.

The following teams have placed in the top four of their respective IHSA sponsored state championship tournament or meet:

- Soccer (boys): State Champions (2019–2020)
- Football: State Champions (1974–75)

== Activities ==
West Chicago offers over 40 clubs and activities for students, ranging from academic and vocational, to cultural and leadership (the entire list of which can be found here). Among the clubs which are chapters or affiliates of more national notable organizations are: Future Business Leaders of America, National Honor Society, SADD, and SkillsUSA.

The West Chicago Theatre program (Wego Drama) was invited to perform an original children's show at the Edinburgh Fringe Festival in Edinburgh, Scotland in 2016. The group was invited back in the summer of 2020 but due to the COVID-19 pandemic it was cancelled.

The following activities have placed in the top four of their respective IHSA sponsored state tournament:

- Chess: 3rd place (1996–97); 2nd place (1994–95); State Champions (1995–96)
- Music: State Champions (1986–87) Music Director Ron Benner

The following are Journalism Education Association/National Scholastic Press Association national awards that the members of the Wildcat Chronicle staff have won.

- Journalism Education Association/National Scholastic Press Association's Write-off Competition, San Antonio, TX, 2012
  - Excellent Rating for Feature Writing, Liz Ramos
  - Excellent Rating for Commentary, Giuliana LaMantia
- JEA/NSPA San Diego, CA, 2014
  - Honorable Mention for Sports Writing, Katelyn Foehner
  - Honorable Mention for Feature Writing, Alexandra Garibay
- JEA/NSPA Seattle, WA, Spring 2017
  - Superior Rating for Photography, Theresa Carriveau
    - Carriveau's award-winning photo from this competition was also featured on cover of the JEA Communication: Journalism Education Today magazine.

== Notable alumni ==
- Tony Aiello TV reporter for WCBS-TV in New York City. Class of 1981 (known in high school as Carm Aiello).
- Scott Dierking was an NFL running back (1977–84), spending most of his career with the New York Jets.
- Harris W. Fawell was a U.S. Congressman (1984–1999), who represented the 13th Congressional District of Illinois.
- Chauncey W. Reed was a U.S. Congressman (1935–1956), who represented the 11th and 14th Congressional Districts of Illinois. He was briefly Chairman of the House Judiciary Committee.
- Chris Voelz co-authoring the NCAA Guidelines for Gender Equity
- Martin O'Donnell Composer primarily known for his work in game music, most notably the Halo series.
- John Konchar Current professional basketball player for the New York Knicks.
