= Naperville North High School =

American public high school

Location
- 899 N. Mill Street; Naperville, Illinois 60563; United States; 41°47′01″N 88°09′26″W

Information
- School type: Public Secondary School
- Opened: 1970
- School district: Naperville Comm. Unit S.D. 203
- Superintendent: Dan Bridges
- Principal: Jay Wachtel
- Staff: 189.10 (FTE)
- Grades: 9–12
- Gender: Coed
- Enrollment: 2,502 (2023-2024)
- Student to teacher ratio: 13.23 (2023-2024)
- Campus: Suburban
- Colors: blue orange
- Athletics conference: DuPage Valley Conference
- Nickname: Huskies
- Publication: Vertigo
- Newspaper: The North Star
- Yearbook: Reflections
- Website: School website
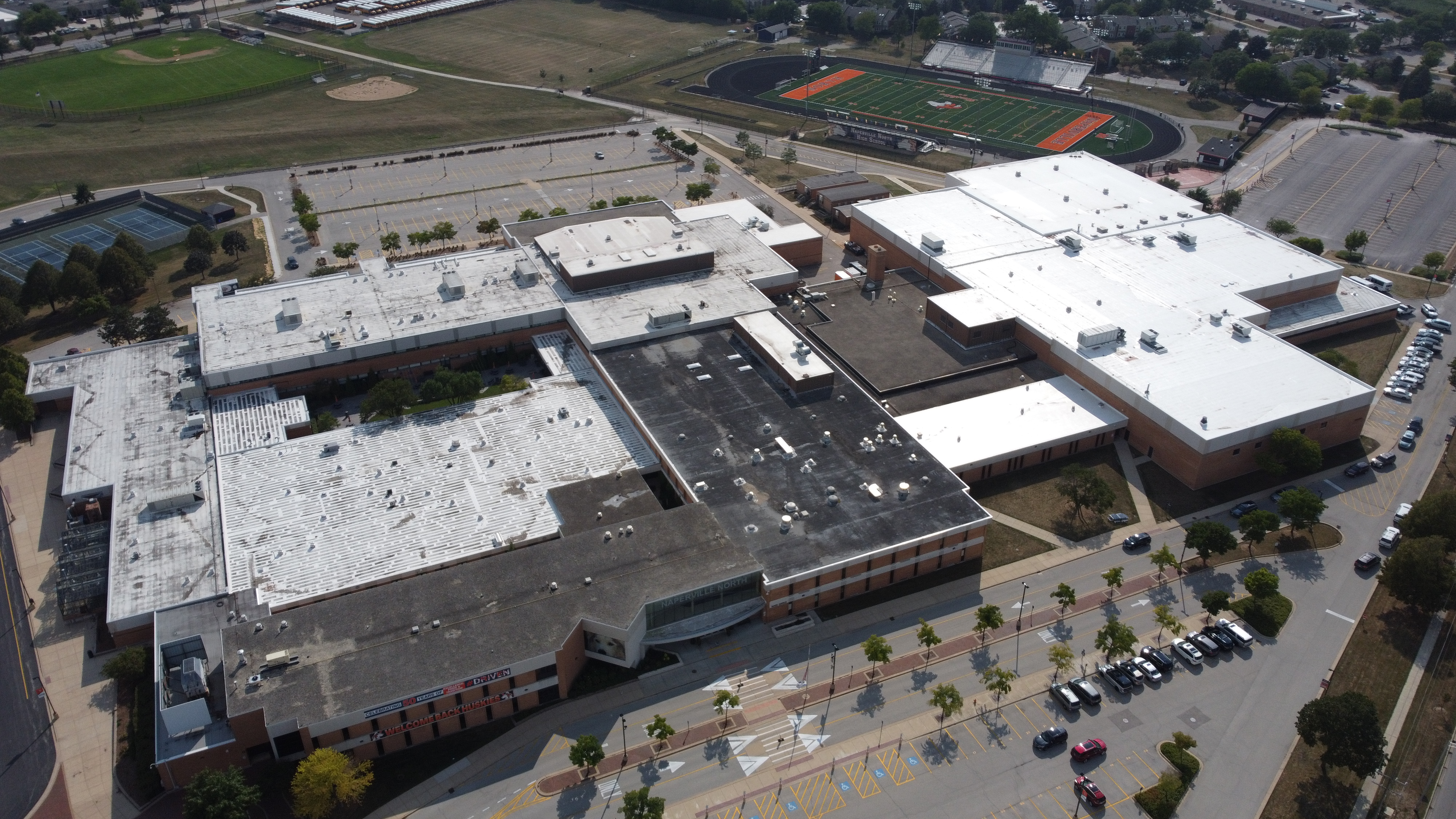

Naperville North High School is a public four-year high school located at the corner of Ogden Avenue and Mill Street in the northern-central part of Naperville, Illinois, a western suburb of Chicago, Illinois, in the United States. It’s a part of Naperville Community Unit School District 203. Naperville North is fully recognized by the Illinois State Board of Education and is a member of the Illinois Association for College Admission Counseling.

== History ==
The building was constructed in 1970 comprising 152,347 square feet (14,000 m²). Additions to the building were made in 1974, 1986 and 1992, increasing the size to the current (as of 2005) 449,665 square feet (42,000 m²). From 1970-1974 Naperville North was limited to freshmen classes only, who were then transferred to Naperville Central High School to continue their education. From the time of its construction until the 1992-1993 academic year, Naperville North was the only high school in its district to have a swimming pool. Thus Naperville Central High School students who took Physical Education courses in swimming or desired to compete in swimming and/or diving would be bussed from Naperville Central to Naperville North. The stadium and pool underwent significant renovations during the 2008-2009 and 2010-2011 school years, with more renovations during 2015-2016 to change the Library into a Learning Commons area, respectively. There were further renovations to the Small Cafe and NPAC areas after the conclusion of the 2022-2023 school year. Principal Stephanie Posey announced her retirement after the 2023-2024 school year, with Jay Wachtel being named the interim for the 2024-2025 school year. Wachtel had previously served as interim principal during the 2020-2021 school year.

== Demographics ==
In 2024, 57.3% of the student body identifies as White, 18.5% of the student body identifies as Asian, 13.5% of the student body identifies as Hispanic, 5.3% of the student body identifies as Black, and 8.1% of the student body identifies as another race.

== Academics ==
In 2017, in its last year issuing the ACT, Naperville North had an average composite score of 25. In 2024, it graduated 96.2% of its students within 4 years. Between 2010 and 2014, when the measure was retired, Naperville North had an average Adequate Yearly Progress (AYP) of 78.6% on the Prairie State Achievement Examination which, along with the ACT, were the assessment tools used in Illinois to fulfill the federal No Child Left Behind Act. This rate was stable for the school, representing scores of 80%, 77%, 76%, 80%, and 80%, respectively.

In 2010, Newsweek ranked Naperville North #1332 in their annual list of the top 1500 American public high schools, based upon the total number of Advanced Placement, International Baccalaureate or Cambridge tests given at a school, divided by the number of seniors graduating that year. In 2005, the school was ranked #1008, in 2007, #1082, in 2008 #926, and in 2009 #1331. In 2018, U.S. Secretary of Education Betsy DeVos recognized Naperville North as one of the 349 National Blue Ribbon Schools. In 2025, U.S. News & World Report ranked it #638 nationally and #25 in Illinois.

In 2020, Naperville North High School was accredited with an International Green Ribbon for Extraordinary Schools.

Naperville North is fully recognized by the Illinois State Board of Education, and is a member of the Illinois Association for College Admission Counseling.

== Athletics ==
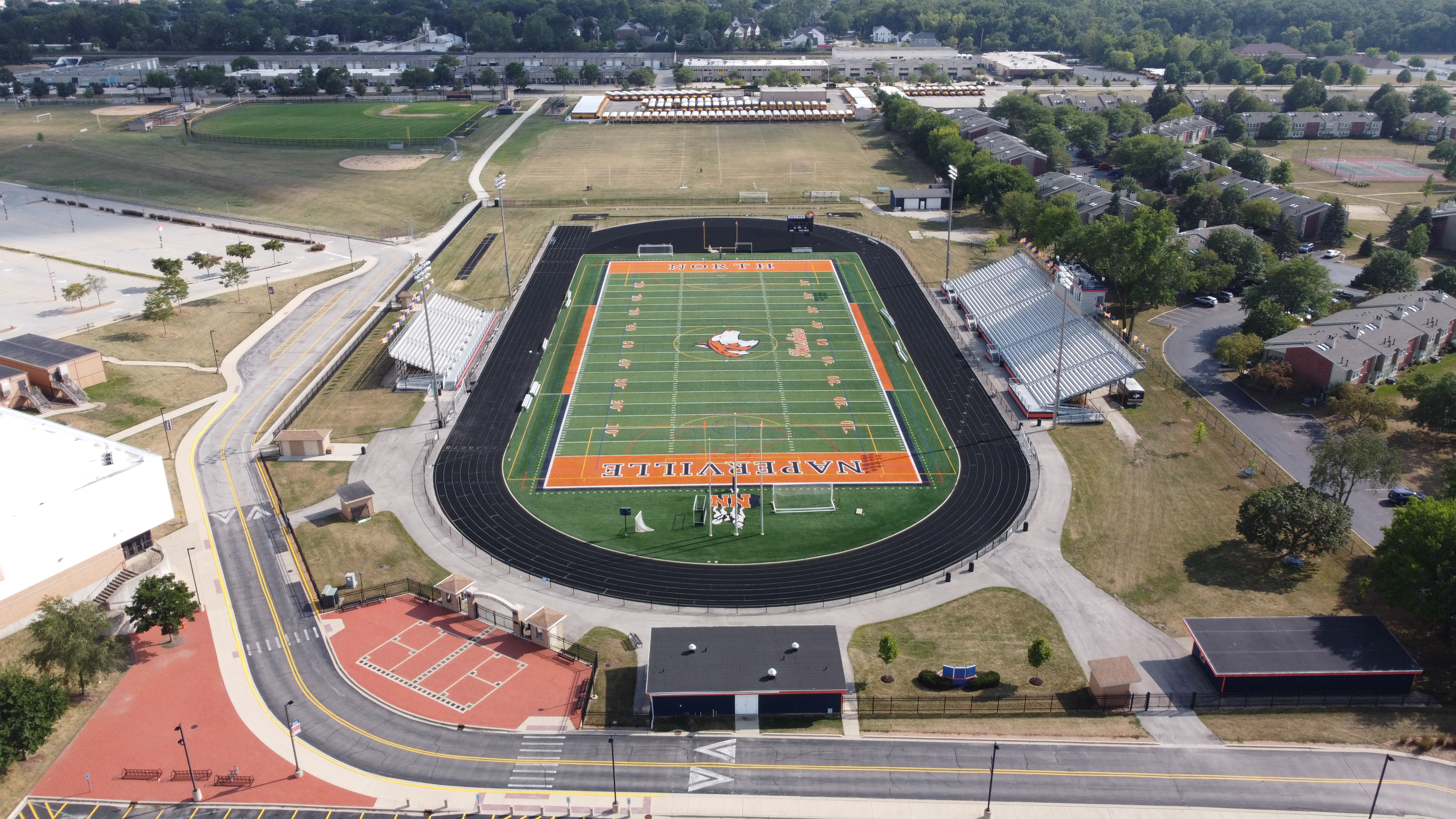
The Football Field and Track

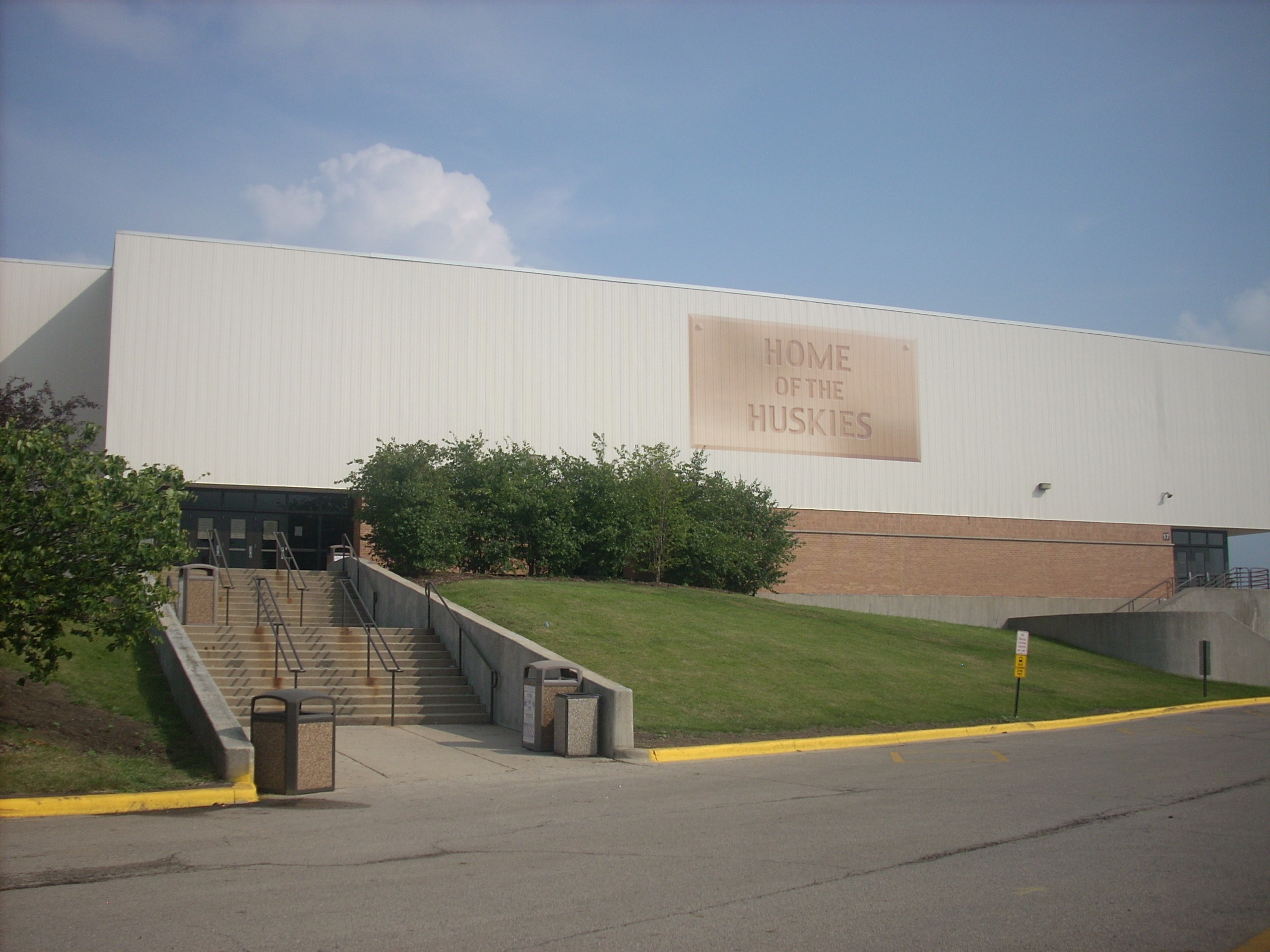
The Athletic Entrance and Contest Gym

Naperville North competes in the DuPage Valley Conference (DVC). Naperville North is a member of the Illinois High School Association (IHSA), which governs most interscholastic sports and competitive activities in Illinois. The school's teams are stylized as the Huskies. The mascot's name is Buster.

From 1975–1987, Naperville North played its home football games at Naperville Central. In 1988, Naperville North opened Harshbarger/Welzel Stadium as its new home field.

The school sponsors multiple interscholastic athletic teams for young men and women under the IHSA: basketball, bowling, cross country, golf, lacrosse, soccer, swimming & diving, tennis, track & field, volleyball, water polo, and wrestling. Along with this, young men may compete in baseball and football, while young women may compete in badminton, gymnastics, and softball. Cheerleading and dance are co-ed teams, often consisting both boys and girls on their respective rosters. They will offer girls’ flag football beginning in the 2025-2026 school year for the fall season.

In addition to the sports listed above, the school also offers club sports in girls’ field hockey, boys’ gymnastics, ice hockey (co-op with Naperville Central), table tennis, and ultimate frisbee.

The following teams have won a state trophy in their respective IHSA sponsored state tournament or meet:

- Badminton (girls): 1st place (tie) (2011–12)
- Cross Country (boys): State Champions (2008–09)
- Cross Country (girls): State Champions (1993–94, 2001–02, 2004–05, 2005–06, 2012–13, 2014–15, 2016–17, 2017–18, 2018–19, 2019–20)
- Dance: State Champions (2018–19)
- Football: State Champions (1992–93, 2007–08)
- Golf (boys): State Champions (1989–90, 1994–95)
- Gymnastics (boys): State Champions (2000–01)
- Soccer (boys): State Champions (1998–99) (2016–17) (2017–18) (2018–19)
- Soccer (girls): State Champions (1987–88, 2011–12)
- Swimming & Diving (boys): State Champions (1995–96)
- Tennis (boys): State Champions (1993–94)
- Volleyball (boys): State Champions (1996–97)

=== Activities ===
The school is also host to a Certamen; a quizbowl-like team, placing first in the 2004 state Latin convention; the Northern Lights, a nationally competitive winter guard; the Marching Huskies marching band, who tied for second in the state championship in 2005 and took fourth in state in 2009; and a drama department that contributes regularly to the Illinois High School Theatre Fest. Notable recent IHSTF productions with North students in the cast or crew began with The Kentucky Cycle in 1999, ending a decade-long absence from the festival, and have since included West Side Story, Pirates of Penzance and Macbeth. In 2000, a Naperville North presentation of Twelve Angry Jurors was selected to perform as a showcase at the IHS Theatre Festival. More recent selections taken to state include The Laramie Project, Angel's Fall and Wings. The Naperville North theatre recently received a technical over-haul, allowing for better lighting and control mechanisms. North's newspaper, the North Star, has won numerous local and statewide awards.

The Math Team at Naperville North has been the DuPage Valley Conference champions for 28 consecutive years and were Illinois state champions 14 of the last 16 years, and won ten consecutive Math Team state championships (1998–2007). Naperville North also participates in the North Suburban Math League. In 2008, the math team competed at the ICTM Regional competition at the College of DuPage and placed 1st overall. During the ICTM State competition at the University of Illinois in 2008, Naperville North lost to IMSA, which prevented North from winning their 11th consecutive state championship. They received 2nd place overall. In 2009, Naperville North regained the state title, their fourteenth in sixteen years. Naperville North again won the ICTM Division 4AA state championship in 2016. The WYSE team won the state championship from 1999 to 2005, 2007 to 2009, 2012, and 2013.

In 2009, Naperville North created a FIRST Robotics Competition Team. Huskie Robotics is one of the school's largest clubs and is well known around the school and surrounding community for its outreach events. The student-led team builds competitive robots with support from teacher-coaches, mentors, and corporate sponsors. In 2013, Huskie Robotics was part of the winning alliance at the Midwest Regional, granting them a spot in the FIRST Robotics World Championship in St. Louis. In 2020 and 2021, Huskie Robotics won the Chairman's Award at the Midwest regional. In 2024, the Huskies won the Heartland regional, which granted them a spot in the World Championship where they placed 8th.

Naperville North has a Junior State of America (JSA) chapter. Naperville North's JSA chapter is well known, and has a high chapter membership in the Midwest state. They are debaters who form a tight knit group. The chapter is also involved in the state structure of JSA. Naperville North also has a DECA Chapter. The DECA chapter has grown in size and in caliber. In the past five years, Naperville North's DECA chapter has had over fifty different state qualifiers, ten state winners (top three), five national winners, including one taking the championship, and elected a State President, who leads Illinois DECA.

In the winter of 2011, NNHS announced they may have to discontinue print publication of "The North Star." This happened as a result of decreased advertising revenue and subscribers.

In 2018, NNHS announced a new esports club, hosting competitive teams in games such as Rocket League, Overwatch, and League of Legends. It quickly grew into one of the school's largest organizations. That same year the IHSA began laying the foundation for an Esports State Series and State Final (IHSEA). NNHS esports went on to win the Illinois High School Esports Association in Overwatch championship in May 2019. In late 2019 as a rookie team they competed in the North America Scholastic Esports Federation Overwatch Tournament, eventually traveling to Santa Clara, CA where they lost in the championship finals to Rocklin High School.

== Partnerships ==
The school offers an international exchange program with Steinbart Gymnasium in Duisburg, Germany. The partnership is part of the German American Partnership Program.

== Notable alumni ==
- Kevin Barnett, former professional volleyball player; competed at 2000 and 2004 Summer Olympics; current volleyball broadcaster on ESPNU
- Paul Brittain, actor and comedian; former cast member of Saturday Night Live
- Chris Brown, former NFL running back
- Levelle Brown, former professional football player
- Henry Domercant, former professional basketball player; current head coach of the Windy City Bulls of the NBA G League.
- Glenn Earl, former NFL safety
- Dave Garnett, former NFL linebacker
- Emily Giffin, author of Something Borrowed (one former Naperville North teacher inspired a character in the novel)
- Jerry Hairston Jr., former MLB infielder
- Scott Hairston, former MLB outfielder
- Adrian Holovaty, Web developer, journalist, entrepreneur, co-creator of the Django
- James Holzhauer, Jeopardy! contestant
- Jordan Johnson, former professional MMA fighter
- Will Johnson, professional soccer player and winner of the 2008 MLS Goal of the Year Award.
- Matt LaCosse, former NFL tight end
- Justin McCareins, former NFL wide receiver
- Marisol Nichols, actress (Nadia Yassir in 24)
- Bob Odenkirk, comedian, actor, writer, director and producer (Mr. Show). (Better Call Saul) (Breaking Bad)
- James O'Shaughnessy, tight end for NFL's Chicago Bears
- Joshua Penn, professional soccer player in the MLS
- Brian Plotkin, former professional soccer player; current head coach of Army men's soccer
- Matthew Prozialeck blues musician, harmonica player
- Bo Richter, NFL defensive end for the Minnesota Vikings
- Andrew Santino, stand-up comedian
- Kayla Sharples, professional soccer player for the Kansas City Current in the National Women’s Soccer League (NWSL)
- Nick Solak, MLB second baseman/outfielder
- Jeri Kehn Thompson, talk radio personality, Republican consultant, wife of Sen. Fred Thompson
- Sachal Vasandani, jazz singer & composer
- Lucy Westlake, youngest American Woman to summit Mount Everest.

== Notable faculty ==
- J. Glenn Schneider (1935-2017), history and government teacher; served in the Illinois House of Representatives

== See also ==
- List of high schools in Illinois
