= Lucy Westlake =

American mountain climber (born 2003)

Personal information
- Nationality: American
- Born: November 4, 2003 (age 22) Upper Peninsula of Michigan
- Occupation: Mountain climbing

Climbing career
- Major ascents: Mount Everest; U.S. State High Points

Lucy Westlake (born November 4, 2003) is an American mountaineer. She became the youngest American woman to climb Mount Everest, at the time, when she reached the summit on May 12, 2022. She is also the youngest female to have climbed the highest point in each U.S. State when she reached the summit of Denali in June 2021.

== Early & personal life ==
Westlake was born on November 4, 2003, during a snowstorm in her family's cabin in Michigan's Upper Peninsula. Westlake's family lived in Mexico for a year when she was 6. In 2016, Westlake moved to Naperville, Illinois. She attended Naperville North High School, and graduated a semester early in 2021 in order to climb Everest.

Westlake attends the University of Southern California where she has received a scholarship to compete in cross country and track and field. She is a Christian. In 2022, Westlake partnered with AWE Summit Scholarship Foundation Program to award 2023 Summit Scholarships to young women as a commitment to advancing gender equity in mountaineering.

== Athletics ==
Westlake is an avid runner, who started competing at an early age in various races and competed throughout high school in cross country and track and field. By age four, she had convinced her parents to allow her to race in her town's 5K race. In her final high school race on November 7, 2021, she set a personal best in a three-mile race with a time of 16:55.54 at the Illinois Girls' Cross Country Class 3A State Championship while running for Naperville North High School. She placed ninth and Naperville North placed seventh overall. She is also an elite triathlete in the USA Triathlon Junior Elite Series.

== Climbing career ==
=== U.S. State Highpoints ===
On July 22, 2016, at the age of 12 years, 8 months, and 18 days, Westlake became the youngest girl to summit the highest point in each state in the contiguous United States, finishing at Kings Peak in Utah. Westlake started mountain climbing in 2011 when she climbed Black Mountain, Kentucky's highest peak. In 2012, she climbed 13 US state peaks. She beat Kristen Kelliher of Vermont's record, who was 17 years old when she set the record in 2011.

Westlake completed her journey of summiting all 50 peaks on June 20, 2021, at Denali. She set a record as the youngest female, at 17 years, 7 months and 17 days old, to climb all 50 of the U.S. state highpoints by beating Kristen Kelliher, who was 18 years 1 month and 15 days old when she set the record in 2012. The climb also allowed Westlake and her father Rodney to claim the record of the youngest father-daughter team to climb all 50 state highpoints. Previously, Westlake had attempted the climb in 2017, but hazardous conditions prevented them from reaching the summit.

=== Everest ===
Westlake reached the summit of Mount Everest on Thursday, May 12, 2022, at 5:36 a.m. The previous record was held by Samantha Larson of Long Beach, California, who reached the summit on May 16, 2007, at 18 years, 7 months and 9 days old. Westlake reached the summit at the age of 18 years, 6 months and 8 days old, meaning she beat the record by about a month. Westlake started her expedition on April 18, and she summited 25 days later, which put her above the normal pace of 45 to 60 days to summit Everest. Lucy was accompanied by Mingma Chhiring Sherpa through the summit.

Westlake's record has since been beaten by Emma Schwerin, who reached the summit of Everest on May 15, 2025 at the age of 17 years, 2 months, and 24 days.
