= Chris Voelz =

Chris Voelz (born May 29, 1949) is the executive director of the Collegiate Women Sports Awards, the most prestigious national collegiate sports awards program for women since 1976. Voelz also heads her own consulting business, A+ (Athletics Plus), which focuses on presentations, keynote speeches, seminars, and other educational contributions especially for or about women in sport. Voelz currently serves as an ambassador and steward for Billie Jean King’s Women's Sports Foundation.

Voelz has served as Executive Director of the CWSA since 2012. Prior to that she served as the Leadership Gift Officer for the Women's Sports Foundation from 2001 to 2008. From 1988 to 2002, she served as one of the six separate athletics directors in the nation, at the University of Minnesota. Serving in that position she set attendance, academic, fundraising and performance records while building eight athletic facilities and adding three sports.

Voelz has been inducted into three Halls of Fame; Sports Fitness Magazine named her one of the most influential people in sports in the nation; the Star Tribune named her #22 of the 100 Most Important Sports Figures of the Century in Minnesota. Voelz served as President of NACWAA (National Association of Collegiate Women Athletics Administrators) and in 2011 was honored by NACWAA with a Lifetime Achievement Award.

Voelz was elected for the NCAA Gender Equity Task Force and was a co-author of the Gender Equity Definition advanced by NACWAA and adopted by NCAA.

From 1978 to 88, Voelz served the University of Oregon as its head women's volleyball coach and associate athletics director.

As a high school teacher and coach she coached volleyball, basketball, and softball after having competed collegiately at Illinois State University in those three sports, as well as golf. She served as president of the Student Athlete Advisory Board for both Illinois State University and the state of Illinois.

In November 2016, Voelz was award the Distinguished Alumni Award from Community High School (West Chicago) for her work with securing a place for girls and women in competitive sports and co-authoring the NCAA Guidelines for Gender Equity.
