= Glenn Earl =

American football player (born 1981)

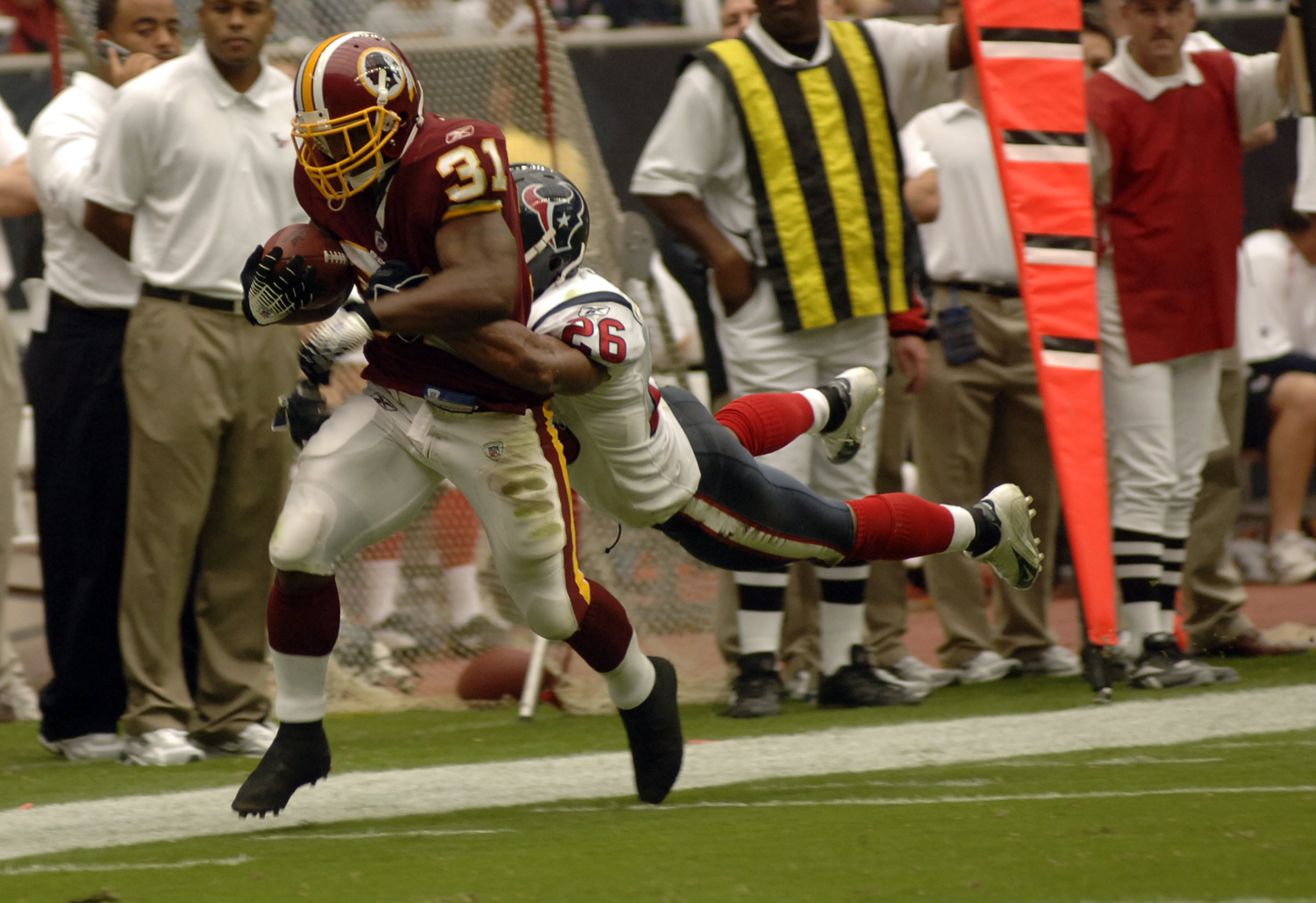
- Earl tackles Washington Redskins running back Rock Cartwright.

No. 26
- Position: Safety

Personal information
- Born: June 10, 1981 (age 45); Southfield, Michigan, U.S.
- Listed height: 6 ft 1 in (1.85 m)
- Listed weight: 222 lb (101 kg)

Career information
- High school: Naperville North (Naperville, Illinois)
- College: Notre Dame
- NFL draft: 2004: 4th round, 122nd overall pick

Career history
- Houston Texans (2004–2007); Chicago Bears (2009)*
- * Offseason or practice squad member only

Career NFL statistics
- Total tackles: 154
- Sacks: 2.0
- Forced fumbles: 1
- Interceptions: 3
- Stats at Pro Football Reference

Glenn Earl (born June 10, 1981) is an American former professional football player who was a safety in the National Football League (NFL). He was selected by the Houston Texans in the fourth round of the 2004 NFL draft. He grew up in Lisle, Illinois and attended Naperville North High School. He then played college football for the Notre Dame Fighting Irish.

== College career ==
He began his career at the University of Notre Dame as a wide receiver before switching to safety after his redshirt freshman season. He played in 38 games for the Irish with 24 starts and amassed 169 career tackles, three forced fumbles, five fumble recoveries, four INTs, four sacks and 3 blocked kicks.

Earl earned a reputation as a hard hitter in the Irish secondary. He was one of the better enforcers Notre Dame had in recent years, even being labeled as "The Quiet Assassin" by teammates.

== Professional career ==
=== Houston Texans ===
Earl was selected by the Houston Texans in the fourth round of the 2004 NFL draft. He made 31 starts through his first three seasons and had a career-high 74 tackles in 2006. Earl was knocked out with a torn Lisfranc ligament in his foot during the 2007 preseason in a game at Reliant Stadium. After four years in Houston, Earl was released on August 29, 2008.

=== Chicago Bears ===
After two seasons away from the NFL recovering from his foot injury, Earl agreed to terms on a one-year contract with the Chicago Bears on March 20, 2009.

On July 28, 2009, Glenn Earl retired. "He's decided to hang it up," Craig Domann said. "He's been dealing with some injuries since he came out of Notre Dame. I think he felt like it was time to move on."

== NFL career statistics ==
Legend
**Bold**	Career high

Year	Team	Games		Tackles					Interceptions					Fumbles			
Year	Team	GP	GS	Cmb	Solo	Ast	Sck	TFL	Int	Yds	TD	Lng	PD	FF	FR	Yds	TD
2004	HOU	12	9	45	36	9	0.0	2	0	0	0	0	0	0	0	0	0
2005	HOU	10	7	35	22	13	0.0	2	**2**	**2**	0	**2**	**6**	0	0	0	0
2006	HOU	**15**	**15**	**74**	**60**	**14**	**2.0**	**5**	1	**2**	0	**2**	4	**1**	0	0	0
		37	31	154	118	36	2.0	9	3	4	0	2	10	1	0	0	0
