= Neuqua Valley High School =

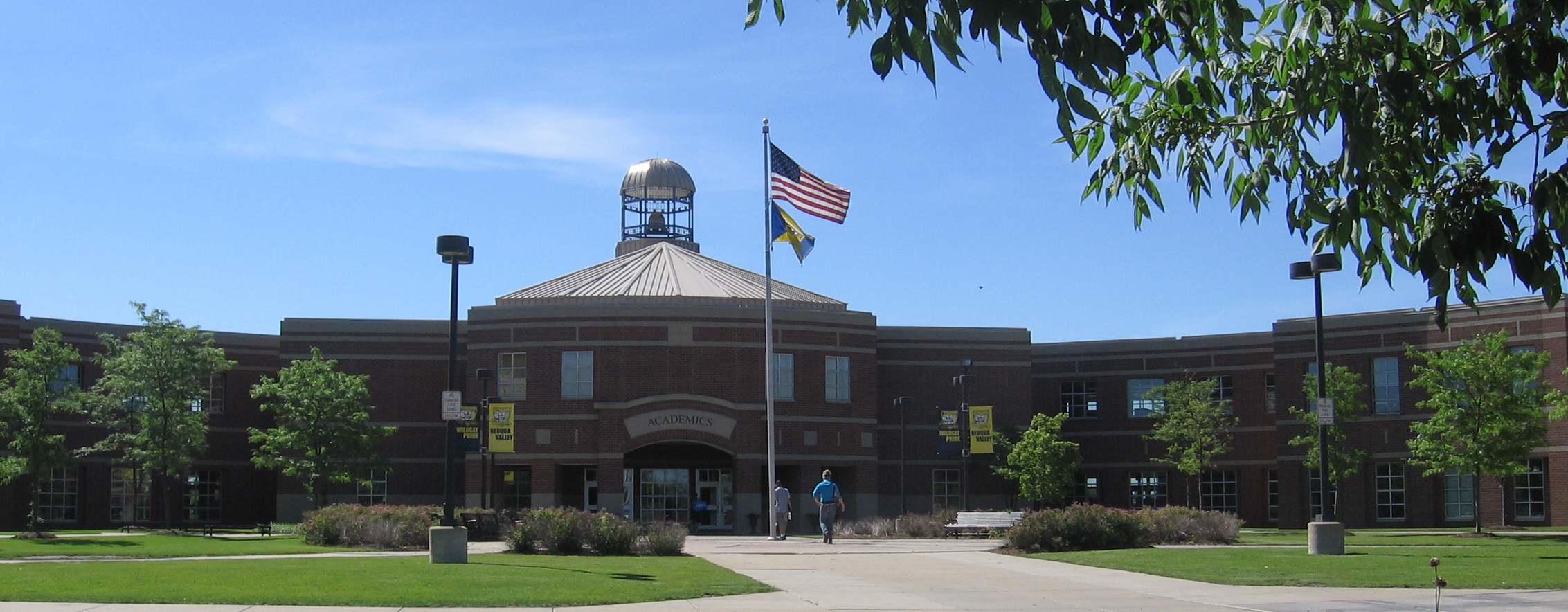

Location
- 2360 95th Street; Naperville, Will, Illinois 60564; United States; 41.70762°N 88.196011°W

Information
- School type: Public secondary
- Motto: "And As Always... Go Wildcats!"
- Opened: 1997
- School district: Indian Prairie S.D. 204
- Superintendent: John Price
- Principal: Lance Fuhrer
- Staff: 200.50 (FTE)
- Grades: 9–12
- Gender: Coed
- Enrollment: 3,008 (2023-2024)
- Average class size: 27.7
- Student to teacher ratio: 15.00
- Campus: Suburban
- Colors: Navy Blue; Gold
- Fight song: Across the Field
- Athletics conference: Dupage Valley Conference
- Nickname: Wildcats
- Publication: The Essence
- Newspaper: The Echo; Wildcat Weekly (program); What's Up Wildcats (program)
- Yearbook: Neshnabec
- Website: nvhs.ipsd.org

Neuqua Valley High School (NVHS) /ˈniːkwə/ is a public four-year high school located near the corner of Illinois Route 59 and 95th Street in Naperville, Illinois, a western suburb of Chicago, Illinois, in the United States. Neuqua Valley is the counterpart to Waubonsie Valley High School and Metea Valley High School, in Indian Prairie School District 204.

== History ==
The campus currently consists of two locations: the Birkett Freshman Center building, which houses freshmen, and the Main Campus, the original building, which houses sophomores, juniors, and seniors. Currently, the Main Campus is undergoing an expansion project which is planned to be finished and operational beginning in the 2027–28 school year, in which freshmen will move to the Main Campus, uniting all four grade levels in one building for the first time since 2003.

The original Neuqua Valley campus building was opened in August 1997, and was built to house 3000 students. The school cost $63 million to build, which at the time was the most expensive high school in Illinois, and was the largest high school built in the state in nearly eighty years. The school is named after Neuqua, a Potawatomi, and son of Waubonsie.

Starting with the 2003–2004 academic year, the nearby middle school (Crone Middle School) was converted to house the freshman class in an effort to alleviate overcrowding. From that point on, the freshmen attended class at the Freshman Center, and the Main Campus housed only the sophomore, junior, and senior classes. A third building that was completed around 2007, the Frontier Campus, allowed seniors to receive dual credit for classes from the College of DuPage. These students attended class in block sessions with no classes on Friday. It allowed for independence and freedom. Seniors from Waubonsie Valley High School also participated in the program. The Frontier Campus option was closed in 2012.

The lake behind the school is known as "Lake Birkett", in honor of the school's first principal, Kathryn Birkett, also the namesake of the Freshman Campus building, in honor of her service as district superintendent until 2014.

Neuqua Valley was designed by the architecture firm ATS&R. The design is based on one of the firm's prior projects in Minnesota. The firm used the design again for a high school in Pennsylvania that opened in 1999.

In September 2017, Neuqua Valley became the first high school in District 204 to be named a National Blue Ribbon School.

== Demographics ==
In the 2023–2024 school year, the school had an enrollment of 3,008 students. 42.3% of students identified as non-Hispanic white, 40.2% of students identified as Asian, 8.0% identified as Hispanic or Latino, 5.2% identified as black or African-American, 4.1% identified as multiracial, and 0.2% identified as Native American or Pacific Islander.

== Academics ==
In 2022, Neuqua Valley had an average composite ACT score of 26.0, and graduated 95% of its senior class.

In 2024, U.S. News & World Report ranked Neuqua Valley 396th in their annual list of the top American public high schools.

In 2025, Neuqua Valley High School was ranked 10th in the "Best Public High Schools in the Chicago Area" by Niche and was the top ranked high school in Naperville, Illinois.

The Main Campus, the original building, is divided into five wings, A-E. The A wing contains Neuqua's Fine and Applied Arts, as well as industrial and consumer education classrooms and facilities. The B wing contains History, English and Health classrooms. The C wing contains Science classrooms complete with lab equipment and also television production studios. This wing also includes the library. The D wing contains Math, Computer Science, Foreign Language, Special Education (SPED) and Business classrooms. The E wing contains the cafeteria and Physical Education facilities and the staff room. The Birkett Freshman Center (BFC) has 3 pseudo-wings G, H, and J. The G wing holds the commons, all business classes for freshman, the physical education rooms, and the engineering rooms. The H wing holds all special ed, the main office, the Class house, the staff lunch room, and the staff offices. The J wing holds all core academic classes, such as, Math, Science, English, Foreign Language, and Social Studies. It also includes all art rooms, and the library.

== Honors ==
Neuqua Valley has received recognition by the Grammy Association for its music program. The school was named a GRAMMY signature school in 1998, 1999, and 2001, a GRAMMY signature school Gold in 2000, 2003, 2004, and 2009, and the National GRAMMY Signature school "Best in Nation" in 2005 and 2013. The Music Department homepage has a list of other awards.

In September 2017, Neuqua was the first high school in the area to receive the National Blue Ribbon Award under then U.S. president Donald Trump. Principal Bob McBride also received an award from Trump. This award was only given to 8 principals across the country.

== Controversy ==
On the first day of the 2015–2016 school year, a student allegedly wore a Confederate flag, sparking a mass social media response. Yahoo! Canada published an article regarding the flag and its effect beyond Neuqua Valley High School.

== Athletics ==
Neuqua Valley competes in the DuPage Valley Conference for athletics. The school is also a member of the Illinois High School Association (IHSA), and competes in state tournaments that the IHSA sponsors.

The school sponsors interscholastic teams for young men and women in basketball, cross country, golf, soccer, swimming and diving, tennis, track and field, volleyball, and water polo. Young men also have teams sponsored in baseball, football, and wrestling. Women may compete in badminton, bowling, gymnastics, cheerleading, and softball.

While not sponsored by the IHSA, the school's athletic department also supports a competitive poms team, a dance team (orchesis), a rugby team, and a team which competes in and works with the Special Olympics. Outside of these teams, the school sponsors a lacrosse club, a sport recognized as an emerging sport by the IHSA. An extensive intramural program is available, competing in many sports including basketball, bowling, and even ping pong. Each fall, Neuqua participates in a women's powderpuff football tournament with Waubonsie, Metea, Naperville Central, Naperville North, and Benet Academy in Lisle. Neuqua is home to a large multi-team ultimate frisbee club, which started in 2007. The varsity team placed third in the nation in the 2012 season.

The boys' cross-country team has placed within the top 15 in the state race in Peoria every year since 2001. In 2007, the boys' cross country team won the Nike Team Nationals. The team ran under the name "Naperville XC Club" to avoid violating IHSA season limitation by-laws. They placed 12th in 2009 and 2010, and were fifth in the nation in 2016.

=== State championships won ===
- Badminton: 2014–15, 2015–16, 2024-2025
- Baseball:2006–07
- Cross country (boys'): 2007–08, 2009–10, 2016–17
- Dance team: 2014–15, 2015–16
- Hockey: 2002–03
- Soccer (boys'): 2003–04
- Soccer (girls'): 2004–05
- Special Olympics (basketball): 2002–2003, 2003–2004, 2004–2005, 2008–2009, 2010–2011
- Swimming and diving (boys'): 2007–08
- Swimming and diving (girls'): 2018–19, 2019-2020
- Track and field (boys'): 2017–18, 2020-2021
- Flag Football (boys'): 2010–11

=== Facilities ===
The school's athletic facilities include one 8-lane, 25-yard indoor swimming pool that is 13 feet deep at the start and 9 feet deep at the turn, with a side diving well with two boards, and a small 3-lane 20-yard wading/warm-up pool.

== Notable alumni ==
- Brittany Bock – former NWSL defender, member of United States women's national soccer team
- Roman Celentano – Major League Soccer goalkeeper for FC Cincinnati
- Bryan Ciesiulka – former MLS midfielder
- Jon Rhattigan – American football linebacker for the Chicago Bears
- Kevin Cordes – American record holder in the 100 and 200-yard breaststrokes and 2016 Olympic gold medalist
- Chris Derrick – distance runner
- Patrick Doody – former MLS defender
- Mike Dudek, football wide receiver for the Illinois Fighting Illini
- Dwayne Evans – professional basketball player for the Hiroshima Dragonflies
- Lex Fridman – Russian-American computer scientist and podcast host
- Bryan Gaul – former MLS defender
- Mark Gronowski – NFL football quarterback for the [Miami dolphins football team]
- Keith Habersberger – internet personality, part of YouTube group The Try Guys
- Ian Krol – pitcher in the Mexican Baseball League
- Evan Lysacek – 2010 Olympic gold medalist in figure skating
- Babatunde Oshinowo – former NFL defensive tackle
- Megan Oyster – former NWSL defender
- Danielle Panabaker – actress
- John Poulakidas - shooting guard for the Dallas Mavericks of the NBA
- Chris Redd – actor, comedian; former Saturday Night Live cast member
- John Summit - aka John Schuster, Tech House DJ
- Miralem Sulejmani – former professional winger; former member of the Serbia national team
- Lauren Underwood – U.S. Representative for Illinois's 14th congressional district
- Lindsay Wisdom-Hylton – assistant coach for Boston College Eagles women's basketball; former WNBA forward
- Zoey Goralski - former NWSL defender
