= Levelle Brown =

American football player (born 1977)

No. 20
- Position: Fullback/Linebacker

Personal information
- Born: June 5, 1977 (age 49)
- Listed height: 6 ft 0 in (1.83 m)
- Listed weight: 245 lb (111 kg)

Career information
- High school: Naperville North (Naperville, Illinois)
- College: Northwestern (1995–1998)
- NFL draft: 1999: undrafted

Career history
- Chicago Rush (2003–2004); Nashville Kats (2005)
- Stats at ArenaFan.com

Levelle Desean Brown (born July 5, 1977) is an American former professional football player. He was born in Winfield, Illinois. He is the older brother of Chris Brown, running back of the Houston Texans of the National Football League.

== Early life and college ==
Levelle Brown attended Naperville North High School in Naperville, Illinois, where he played football, basketball, and ran track. After graduating, he attended Northwestern University. And he also played basketball.

== Professional career ==
Brown played fullback for the Nashville Kats and the Chicago Rush of the Arena Football League (AFL).
