= Metea =

Native American chief (c.1778–1827)

- Portrait of Metea by Samuel Seymour
- Born: c. 1778; United States
- Died: May 5, 1827 (aged 48–49); Fort Wayne, Indiana, United States
- Occupation: Native American chief
- Title: Chief

Chief Metea or Me-te-a (English: /mə.ˈti.jə/; Potawatomi: Mdewé; "Sulks") (c. 1778 – May 5, 1827) was one of the principal chiefs of the Potawatomi during the early 19th century, described as a "warrior, spiritualist and orator". He frequently acted as spokesman at treaty councils. His village, Meskwawasebyéton, was located on the St. Joseph River near the present-day city of Fort Wayne, Indiana.

Metea was born c. 1778. He led various battles against the encroaching Americans, including during the War of 1812, in which he allied with the Shawnee military leader Tecumseh. After experiencing many injuries, he took on a more diplomatic approach with the Americans, including speaking against the Treaty of Chicago. He acted as principal Potawatomi informant to William Keating during the 1823 expedition into the Indiana Territory by Major Stephen Long. Through treaty negotiations, Metea advocated for Indigenous education, as well as ongoing annuities for the Indigenous people living on the land.

Metea died at Fort Wayne, Indiana in 1827. According to the United States, his death was caused by accidental ingestion of poison, which he mistook for whiskey following a conversation with US dignitaries. It is more likely that he was assassinated.

== Legacy ==
Metea has been commemorated through the naming of multiple locations, including Metea, Indiana, a small town in Cass County, Indiana. Metea County Park and Nature Preserve in Allen County, Indiana and Metea Valley High School in Aurora, Illinois are also named after Metea.
