= Metea Valley High School =

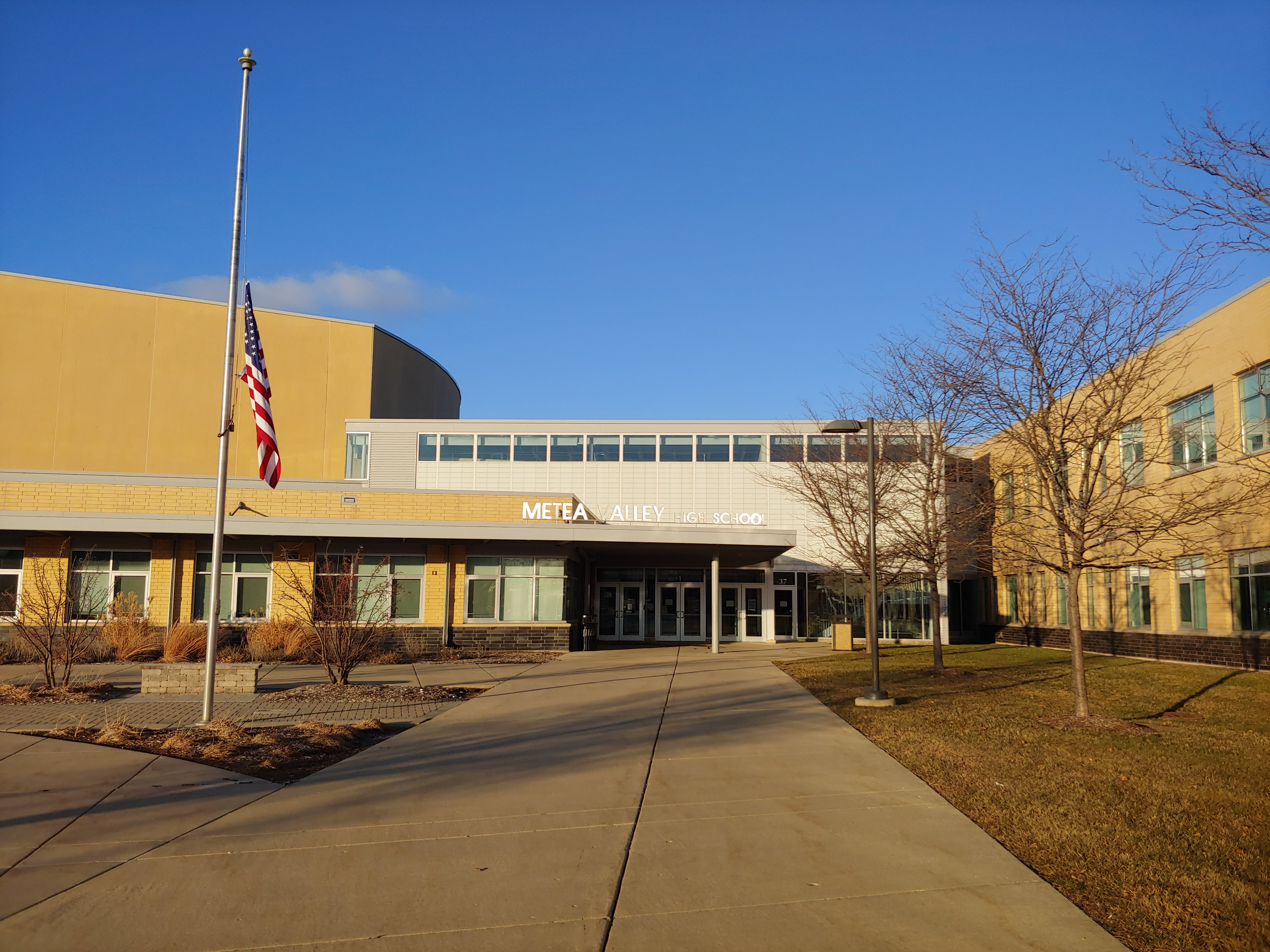

Location
- 1801 N. Eola Road; Aurora, Dupage County, Illinois 60502; United States; 41°47′28.37″N 88°14′19.71″W

Information
- School type: public secondary
- Motto: Live with integrity, Inspire passion for learning, Foster positive relationships, and Expect equity and excellence for all.
- Opened: August 2009
- School district: Indian Prairie SD 204
- Superintendent: Adrian Talley
- Principal: Sara Jennings
- Teaching staff: 194.60 (FTE)
- Grades: 9–12
- Gender: co-ed
- Enrollment: 2,807 (2023-2024)
- Student to teacher ratio: 14.42
- Campus: suburban
- Colors: black gold
- Slogan: "Go Go Mustangs!"
- Fight song: "MV Victory"
- Athletics conference: DuPage Valley Conference
- Mascot: Marty the Mustang
- Nickname: Mustangs
- Rival: Waubonsie Valley High School, Neuqua Valley High School
- Newspaper: The Stampede
- Yearbook: The Rein
- Website: mvhs.ipsd.org

Metea Valley High School is a high school in Aurora, Illinois that opened in August 2009 in DuPage County. The school is one of four high schools operated by the Indian Prairie School District. Waubonsie Valley High School is also in Aurora, while Neuqua Valley High School and Wheatland Academy are in Naperville. The school follows IPSD's tradition of naming its High Schools after Native American figures with its namesake Metea.

== Preparations ==
Serving Indian Prairie School District 204, and opened for the 2009–2010 academic year for freshman and sophomore classes (grades nine and ten), Metea Valley cost $124.7 million to build, and can hold 3,000 students. The school met its full enrollment of students for grades 9-12 during the 2011–2012 academic year. The school began its first Prairie State Achievement Exams (used as a standardized testing measure of academic achievement) during the 2010–2011 academic year, and per Illinois High School Association Policy, the school was not fully recognized for interscholastic sports until that same academic year.

The school's namesake, a chief of the Potawatomi tribe, was selected in 2006 while the school was being planned. The school's colors are black and gold (maintaining a tradition of the district's high schools utilizing gold) and the school's mascot is the 'Mustang'. The colors were announced in February 2007, and the mascot selection in March 2007. Both were chosen by middle school students who began attending the school in 2009, as well as the current Neuqua and Waubonsie students in 2007. The School joined the Upstate Eight Conference in the 2010-2011 school year. They left the Upstate Eight Conference for the DuPage Valley Conference in 2015.

== Demographics ==
In 2024, 29.7% of the student body identified as White, 36.7% of the student body identified as Asian, 13.7% of the student body identified as Black, 14.6% of the student body identified as Hispanic, and 5% of the student body identified as 2 or more races.

In 2025, 28.1% of the student body identified as White, 38.6% of the student body identified as Asian, 14.6% of the student body identified as Black, 13.4% of the student body identified as Hispanic, and 5.1% identified as two or more races.

== Academics ==
Metea Valley High School's first principal was Jim Schmid, former principal of Waubonsie Valley High School. On January 8, 2014, Principal Schmid announced that Dr. Darrell Echols, Principal at Hill Middle School at the time, would succeed him as Metea Valley High School Principal. Echols assumed his position July 1, 2014 following Mr. Schmid's retirement. After 9 years in July 2023, Echols retired as Metea Principal and Daniel DeBruycker took position of Principal for the Metea Valley High School. Metea Valley will be getting a new principal in August 2026 after Mr. Dan DeBruycker leaves Metea.

During the 2013-2014 school year, Metea Valley was ranked as the 669th best high school in America and the 29th best in Illinois by U.S. News & World Report. Metea Valley was also ranked the 23rd most challenging high school in Illinois. This ranking is based on standardized test scores and percentage of students on subsidized lunch, among other factors.

== Construction ==
The school was designed by the Chicago office of DLR Group. The construction manager was Turner Construction Company.

The school's music hallway opened on January 4, 2010. The auditorium was completed in early February 2010.

The campus was ranked #20 on a list of the "Most Amazing High School Campuses in the Nation" in 2014.

== Athletics ==
From the fall of 2009 through the spring of 2015, the athletic teams participated in the Upstate Eight Conference. In the fall of 2015, Metea Valley athletes began participating in the DuPage Valley Conference.

The athletic teams from Metea Valley High School are supported by the Athletic Boosters Club which provides financial support to the athletic program by providing concussion screening for athletes, school wide heart screening, and continual improvement of the athletic facilities.

2012 Lacrosse Combined State Champion - In 2012, Metea Valley students participated on a combined lacrosse team with Waubonsie Valley and won the IHSLA B-division State Championship against Grayslake North High School. 2014 Hockey Combined State Champion - In 2014, Metea Valley students participated on a combined hockey team with Waubonsie Valley students and won the Combined State Championship. 2014 Rugby Combined State Champion - In 2014, Metea Valley students participated on a combined Rugby team with Waubonsie Valley students and won the State Championship. - In 2021, girls volleyball won the IHSA 4a State Championship. They only had 2 losses on the season.

== Music ==
In 2016, Metea Valley was presented with one of three GRAMMY Signature Gold Schools award. GRAMMY Signature School awards are given to high school music programs that are keeping music programs alive and well despite budgets and school politics.

The music department at Metea Valley hosts an annual concert in December named "Collage". The event comprises four repetitions of the same concert spread over two nights; however, soloists and small ensembles who play during transitions often differ between the concerts. Each concert ends with a finale featuring all music students from Metea Valley.

The school's marching band is named the Metea Valley Marching Mustangs. They perform during halftime at all Metea Valley home football games. Their halftime show changes yearly. Every other year the band goes on a trip to another state to perform there. They also participate in band days at places such as University of Wisconsin–Madison, University of Illinois Urbana-Champaign, and Northern Illinois University.

The Marching Mustangs were one of many bands selected to perform at the 2013 Outback Bowl in Tampa Bay, Florida, and would be invited again in 2019. The band also traveled to Hawaii to perform at the Waikiki Holiday Parade and at Pearl Harbor.

Additionally, they participate in an annual Memorial and Labor Day parade in either Naperville or Aurora, the two closest cities.

Metea Valley students also participate in an annual Fine Arts Festival since 2009.

== Legal Controversies ==
In 2010, Police began an investigation on Robert C. Smith, a former physics teacher and track coach at Metea Valley, for sexual assault on a student. As soon as the school district heard of the investigation, Smith was removed from classes and school activities. He was arrested at his home in Mokena, IL with a bail set at $300,000. He was charged with two counts of Class 1 felony sexual assault. The DuPage County Assistant State's Attorney alleged Smith had sexual contact with a 16-year-old student on at least two occasions at a hotel in Naperville. Smith plead guilty to sexual assault with a punishment of six years in prison as well as being registered as a sex offender for life. He also wrote an apology letter to the victim and her family.

In 2018, a warrant was placed on Luke Pigott, former science teacher at Metea Valley, for public indecency, a class A misdemeanor, when an 18-year-old women reported him for exposing himself in a parking lot off of Route 59 on December 29th, 2017. He turned himself in on January 4th, 2018. He allegedly was sitting inside a white or silver SUV when he exposed himself to the teenager. The school district placed him on administrative leave as a response. On August 15th, 2018, Pigott exposed himself to three other women (ages 41, 60, and 61) at the University Heights neighborhood in Naperville. Police investigated the second incident and issued a warrant for Pigott's arrest, and he turned himself in once again. Sources are unable to confirm if criminal sentencing occurred for either charges (publicdata.com).

In 2022, Nathan Bramstedt, former choir director at Metea Valley, was taken into custody by Aurora Police Department (APD) under felony charges of inappropriate sexual misconduct with a student, specifically nine felony counts of criminal sexual assault and three counts of aggravated criminal sexual assault. Once the school district was notified of the investigation, Bramstedt was put on administrative leave. Shortly after, he sent in a letter of resignation that the district accepted. APD released a statement that alledged the abuse began in February 2019 through June 2019 on school grounds.

The victim is a former student who was 17-years-old at the time of abuse. The victim notified authorities, and the DuPage County Children's Center began the investigation. Bramstedt's bond was set at $500,000 with 10% required to post bail and be released from custody. He posted the $50,000 on April 11th, 2022. Bramstedt plead guilty to one count of Class 1 Felony Criminal Sexual Assault - Position of Trust/Authority on July 28th, 2023. He is required to serve 85% of his 9 year sentence in the Illinois Department of Corrections before being parole eligible.

== Notable Alumni ==
- Malik Hall (born 2000), basketball player in the Israeli Basketball Premier League
- Lyndie Lobdell (born 2002), professional ice hockey defenseman in the Professional Women's Hockey League
