= Bill Riley Sr. =

American entertainer (1920–2006)

William J. Riley Sr. (October 7, 1920 – December 15, 2006) was an American entertainer known as "Mr. State Fair" in Iowa.

Riley was born in Iowa Falls, Iowa. His father died when he was 18 months old, and Bill and his brother were raised by their mother through the Great Depression. He attended Ellsworth and Loras Colleges and served in the United States Army. He became involved in radio with KRNT in Des Moines during World War II. In 1946, he first held a television broadcast at the Iowa State Fair in Des Moines. Riley stayed with KRNT until 1973, when he became an executive for Hawkeye Cablevision (now Mediacom).

Riley began the Bill Riley Iowa State Fair Talent Search in 1959. He went from town to town in Iowa, holding talent competitions for Iowans age 2 to 21. The best of these would then come to compete at the Iowa State Fair. Bill Riley was the host and cheerleader for these competitions until he retired in 1996. The following year, his son, Bill Riley Jr., took over hosting duties, and the Plaza Stage where the contest was held was renamed the Anne and Bill Riley Stage. Many of the talent show participants have gone on to successful careers, such as Simon Estes and Carrie McDowell. A total of 110 contestants participated in the talent search in 2006.

Riley was inducted into the Iowa Rock 'n Roll Music Association's Hall of Fame in 2004. In 2006, the state fair honored Riley as the grand marshal of the fair parade. Also, his likeness was sculpted in butter by Sarah Pratt.

Riley died in Scottsdale, Arizona, of complications from leukemia at age 86.
