= Waubonsie Valley High School =

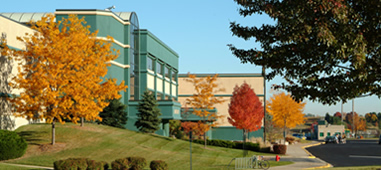

Location
- 2590 Ogden Avenue; Aurora, Illinois 60504; United States; 41°44′18″N 88°15′06″W

Information
- Other name: WVHS
- Type: Public high school
- Motto: Excellence in Every Endeavor
- Established: 1975
- School district: Indian Prairie School District 204
- NCES School ID: 174169004173
- Principal: Jason Stipp
- Teaching staff: 174.30 (on an FTE basis)
- Grades: 9–12
- Enrollment: 2,781 (2023-2024)
- Student to teacher ratio: 15.96
- Campus type: Suburban
- Houses: Pride, Tradition, Spirit, Warrior
- Colors: Green and Gold
- Fight song: "Go Warriors, Fight On!"
- Athletics conference: DuPage Valley Conference
- Mascot: Ovee
- Nickname: Warriors
- Publication: Premier
- Newspaper: The Voice
- Yearbook: Arrowhead
- Website: wvhs.ipsd.org

Waubonsie Valley High School (WVHS) is a public four-year high school in Aurora, Illinois, United States. It was established in 1975; it is one of 3 high schools in Indian Prairie School District 204, along with Neuqua Valley High School and Metea Valley High School.

== History ==
Indian Prairie Community Unit School District #204 (a unit district K-12) was formed in the fall of 1972. In December 1972, a referendum was passed to build and equip a high school at a projected cost of $8.2 million. A separate issue also passed to add a swimming pool. Construction on Waubonsie Valley High School began in the spring of 1973.

In September 1975, Waubonsie Valley opened its doors for its first school year. 293 freshmen, sophomores, and juniors attended the new high school. In addition, 7th and 8th graders were housed in the building (using the name Granger Junior High) until Hill Junior High (now Hill Middle School) opened in the Fall of 1981. Construction delays prevented students from using the gym until May 1976, and the pool until October 1976.

The school was originally designed as an open campus, with very few walls to separate classes. This quickly gave way to temporary room dividers, and eventually, more permanent walls. Major construction projects over the years added three classroom wings, a field house, and an auditorium, leaving just a few clues as to the original design of the building. At the time, the school was considered futuristic with a swimming pool, greenhouse, and planetarium.

Revisions beginning in the May of 2025 included a total renovation of the Auditorium, which completed in December of the same year; artificially turfing the football field and switching the home and away sides; as well as complete reworking of the building's foot traffic circulation and student spaces.

== Demographics ==
In 2024, 35.6% of the student body identified as White, 28.4% of the student body identified as Asian, 19.4% of the student body identified as Hispanic, 11.1% of the student body identified as Black, and 5.5% of the student body identified as another race.

== Music program ==
The Waubonsie Valley music program has received a Grammy Award six times in total. WVHS was named a Grammy Association's Signature School in 1999, 2003, 2004, 2005, 2006, and 2011 through the National Academy of Recording Arts and Sciences. In 2007 and 2011, WVHS was one of two schools in the nation to receive the honor of the Grammy Association's Signature GOLD School.

Their choir program offers seven choirs and several extracurricular ensembles, including two show choirs. Their top mixed show choir was ranked 1st in 2009, 2011, 2013, 2014, and 2015 by the National Show Choir Ranking System.

The Waubonsie Valley orchestra program features 6 distinct curricular groups and one extracurricular ensemble, two of which are exclusive to high school freshmen.

The Waubonsie Valley High School's Marching Band is both a field and parade style competitive marching band, and regularly competes in 3-4 events every marching season (May - November). When they competed in the Bands of America circuit, they were BOA Toledo, OH Regional Finalists in 2002; BOA Massillon, OH Regional Finalists in 2003; and BOA Piscataway, NJ Regional Finalists in 2004. They were finalists at the State of Illinois Invitational Marching Band competition in 2003, 2006, 2007, and 2008. They were also finalists at the Illinois Marching Band Championships (IMBC) as Class 6A Finalists in 2010, 2012, and 2014. receiving the Illinois Marching Band Championships Large Schools Governor's Trophy Champions in 2013.

The Waubonsie Valley High School Wind Ensemble has won Class 4A Honor Band at the Illinois SuperState Concert Band Festival at the University of Illinois in 2018 and 2026.

== Notable alumni ==
- Derek Ahonen (1999), playwright, director, and founder of the Amoralists Theatre Company in New York City.
- Morolake Akinosun (2012), gold medal winner of the women's 4 × 100 metres relay in the 2016 Rio Olympics
- Patrick Beverley, former guard in the NBA, now plays for Hapoel Tel Aviv of the Israeli Basketball Premier League
- Michael Bowden (2005), former professional baseball player
- Fabien Bownes, former NFL wide receiver and kickoff returner
- Parvesh Cheena (1997), actor known for role as Gupta in the NBC series, Outsourced.
- Vanessa DiBernardo (2010), professional soccer player for NWSL’s Kansas City Current
- Troy Fumagalli (2013), tight end
- Jerry Harris (2017), convicted sex offender and former cheerleader from Cheer
- Jonathan Harris (2015), defensive end for NFL’s Minnesota Vikings
- Steve Keller (1990), former professional soccer player
- Chris Schuler (2005), former professional soccer player
- Michael Damian Thomas (1992), Hugo Award-winning science fiction editor and podcaster, publisher of Uncanny Magazine
- Peter Tiberio, professional rugby player
- IceJJFish, American internet personality
- Hannah Bebar (2020), American professional soccer player for NWSL's Bay FC
- Sarah Griffith (2017), professional soccer player

== Notable staff ==
- Dan Schatzeder (physical education teacher) was a Major League Baseball pitcher (1977—91). He was a member of the 1987 World Series Champion Minnesota Twins.
- Angelo DiBernardo (Spanish teacher) is a retired soccer player who played professionally in the North American Soccer League and Major Indoor Soccer League. He also represented the United States at the 1984 Summer Olympics. DiBernardo played alongside soccer legend Pelé during his time at New York Cosmos.
