= Thayer J. Hill Middle School =

Location
- 1836 Brookdale Rd. Naperville, Illinois 60563; United States; 41.7907°N 88.1987°W

Information
- School type: Public primary
- Motto: Live with integrity, Inspire passion for learning, Foster positive relationships, and Expect equity and excellence for all.
- Opened: 1981
- School district: Indian Prairie SD 204
- Superintendent: Dr. John P. Price
- Principal: Leslie Mitchell
- Staff: 100
- Faculty: 9
- Teaching staff: 257
- Grades: 6–8
- Gender: co-ed
- Enrollment: 788 (2025-26)
- Average class size: 27.7
- Campus: suburban
- Colors: Red; Blue
- Mascot: Trailblazers
- Nickname: Trailblazers
- Website: http://hill.ipsd.org

Thayer J. Hill Middle School is a middle school located on Brookdale Road in Naperville, Illinois, a western Suburb of Chicago, Illinois in DuPage County. The original address was 1325 Brookdale Road, but was renumbered to 1836 sometime in the late 1980s. Hill Middle School is one of the seven middle schools that Indian Prairie School District 204 manages. May Watts Elementary School, Cowlishaw Elementary School, and Brookdale Elementary School feed into Hill. Hill Middle School, along with Still and Granger Middle Schools, feed into Metea Valley High School, one of the three high schools District #204 manages.

== About ==
Serving Indian Prairie School District 204, and opened for the 1981 academic year for 6th, 7th and 8th grade classes, Hill Middle School can hold 915 students.

The school's colors are red and blue, and the school's mascot is the 'Trailblazer'. The namesake of the school, Thayer J. Hill, was a prominent educator in the Naperville, Illinois area. He was instrumental in the formation of Indian Prairie Community Unit School District 204 and served as the first superintendent. His career encompassed thirty-five years as a teacher and administrator.

== Construction ==
The school was constructed by Fugard Orth. Inc, Hinsdale, Illinois and was contracted by Thorleif Larsen and Sons, Inc, Itasca, Illinois with at total cost of $4,595,300; when inflation is taken into account, the modern equivalent would be near $40,000,000. When the school was finished in 1981, it possessed the most modern features of any school at the time. The school eventually included an air conditioning unit, which was unheard of for middle schools.

== Student body ==
=== Demographics ===
Hill Middle School is a diverse secondary school. 28% of the student body identifies as Asian-American, compared to the statewide average of 5%. Fewer than 13% of the students attending Metea Valley identify as Hispanic-American, compared to the state average of 26%. Approximately 14% are African-American, compared to the statewide average of 17%. The Caucasian-American population is lower than the state average at 42%. In total, there are 915 students attending Hill Middle School as of 2018.

The students at Hill Middle School are both racially and socio-economically diverse with students from single income families making upwards of $100,000.00 and students from families with a combined income of less than $30,000.00 attending the same school. As of 2018, 20.1% of students are eligible for subsidized lunches. Approximately 98.5% of students are KG immunized.

== Academics ==
Hill Middle School has long been known for its academic strength, with numerous state math and science championships under its belt. The school used to administer Arizona's Instrument to Measure Standards, or AIMS, but replaced it with the PARCC test.

== Activities ==
The school sponsors numerous extracurricular clubs and organizations ranging from arts and academic to cultural and special interest. However, Hill Middle School is most well known for its choral program (see music).

== Athletics ==
Hill Middle School has many athletic teams. Among them are:

- Basketball
- Bowling
- Cross Country
- Football
- Hockey
- Lacrosse
- Soccer
- Softball
- Tennis
- Track & Field
- Volleyball
- Wrestling

== Music ==
=== Awards ===
In 2016, Hill Middle School's Women's Chorus was presented with the only ILMEA sponsorship given to a middle school. The women's chorus has toured throughout the state.

=== Marching band ===
The Marching Trailblazers is the school's marching band.They can often be found practicing in the parking lot of Hill, and throughout the streets of Brookdale neighborhood. They perform at the Memorial Day Parade.

=== Fine Arts Festival ===
Hill Middle School also participates in the Annual Fine Arts Festival. Metea, the feeder school, has partially hosted every event since its opening in 2009.
