= Naperville Central High School =

Public high school in Naperville, Illinois

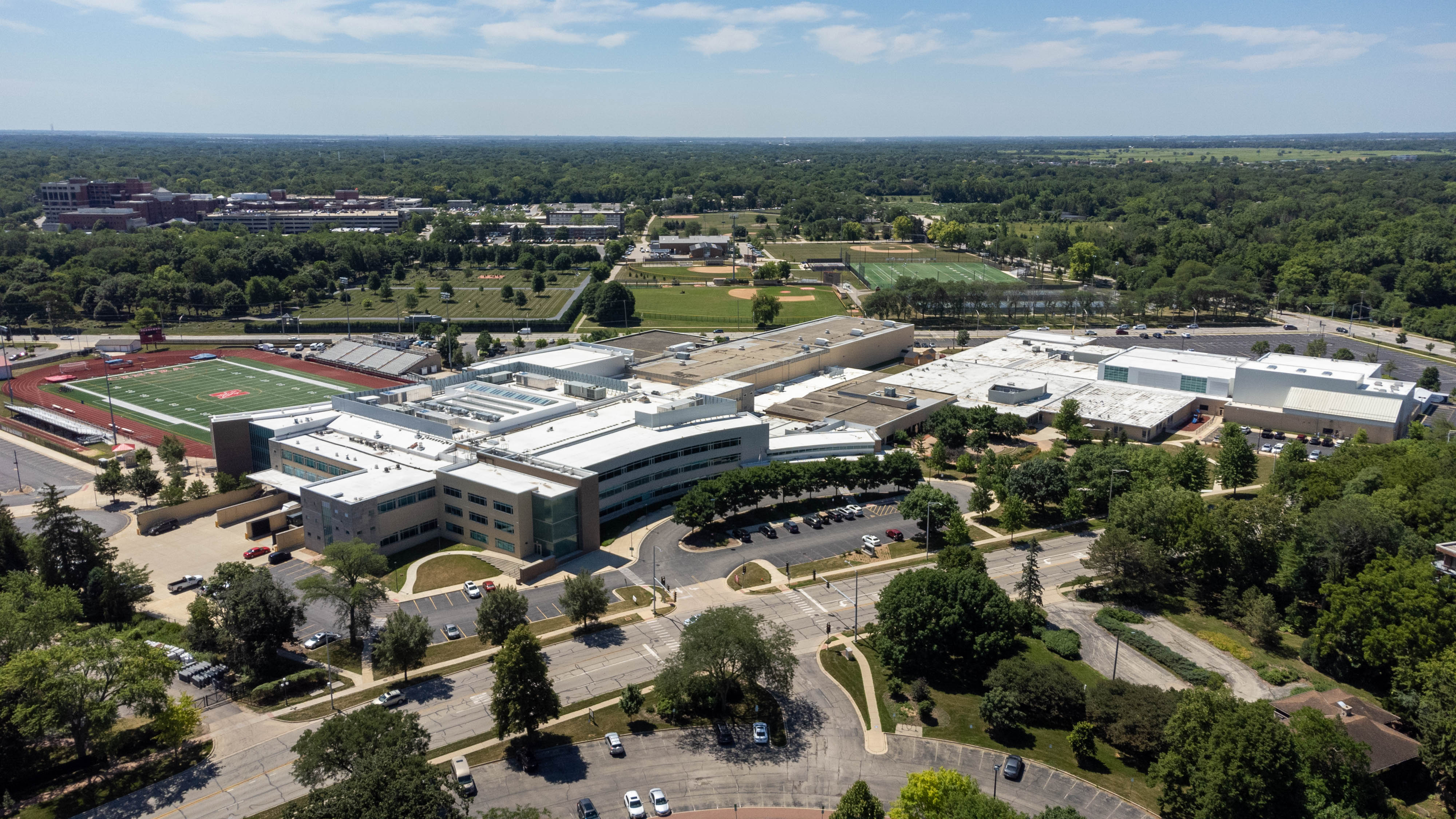

Location
- 440 W. Aurora Avenue; Naperville, Illinois 60540; United States; 41.7672°N 88.1556°W

Information
- School type: public secondary
- Opened: 1863; 163 years ago (2011, current building with complete renovation and additions to the original structure)
- School district: Naperville Comm. Unit S.D. 203
- Superintendent: Dan Bridges
- Principal: Jackie Thornton
- Teaching staff: 179.30 (FTE)
- Grades: 9–12
- Gender: coed
- Enrollment: 2,519 (2023-2024)
- Student to teacher ratio: 14.05
- Campus: suburban
- Colors: red white
- Athletics conference: DuPage Valley Conference
- Mascot: "Redhawks"
- Nickname: Redhawks
- Newspaper: The Central Times
- Yearbook: Flight
- Website: Official website

Naperville Central High School (also referred to as Naperville Central or NCHS) is a four-year public high school located in Naperville, Illinois, a western suburb of Chicago. The school, which enrolls students in grades nine through twelve, is a part of the Naperville Community Unit School District 203.

The school, notable for its strong academic standing and history of athletic accomplishments, has been ranked in the top 3% of high schools nationally by U.S. News & World Report.

== History ==
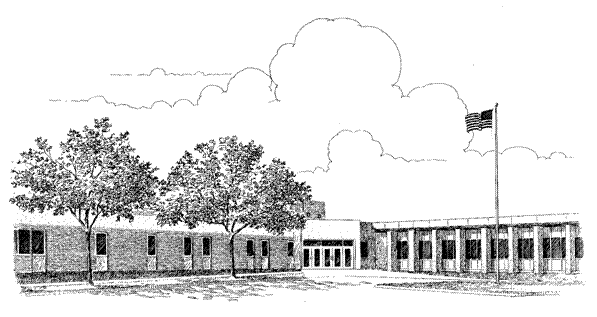
Illustration of the Naperville Central High School main entrance, as it appeared from 1992 to 2010.

The present NCHS structure is on Aurora Avenue just outside the downtown business district in Naperville. The building is within walking distance of the Naperville Riverwalk park/trail network, and is just north of Knoch Park and the Edward Hospital campus. The school is across the street from the historic Naper Settlement.

Naperville High School was established in 1916. The oldest part of the current building, known by some as the "3-Story Wing," was constructed in 1950.

The current Naperville Central building has received building additions in 1955, 1963, 1968, 1987, 1992 and 2009. For the 1992–93 school year, three projects in three independent locations added a Student Services wing in the northeast part of the building (demolished in the summer of 2010 to make way for an addition), an auditorium in the northwest part of the building and a natatorium in the southern part of the building. Prior additions included a field house and renovations to the former student cafeteria area in the late 1980s, the former school library, and a large single-story classroom wing, known as the Flat Wing.

There was an increasing concern about the safety and reliability of Naperville Central. Complaints of lack of building organization, aging infrastructure, and inadequate educational spaces cause it to be the main focus of Naperville School District 203's "Facilities Task Force". After a 59% voter passage of a $43 million referendum, the school underwent a massive renovation to completely renovate approximately 75% of the school's footprint. On May 27, 2009, ground was broken on the renovation. The renovation had the three-story wing undergo a mix of new construction and remodeling in order to house all major subject areas. It also moved and updated the learning resource center, it added physical education and music spaces, it reduced building entrances and put synthetic turf on the football field. At the start of the 2011 school year, renovations were completed, and the school was fully reopened.

=== Plagiarism scandal ===
In 2008, principal Jim Caudill plagiarized a speech he gave to graduating seniors. The speech originally came from Megan Nowicki-Plackett, a teacher at the time who was formerly a student at the school. Earlier in the year, Caudill had fired a newspaper adviser over profanity, which began a free speech debate among the community. The school district ultimately decided to remove Caudill from his position as principal and reassign him to oversight of construction during renovations. Caudill was replaced by Bill Wiesbrook the following year. Wiesbrook was hired in 1996 and previously had worked as a dean to students and assistant principal of operations.

=== Mummy ===
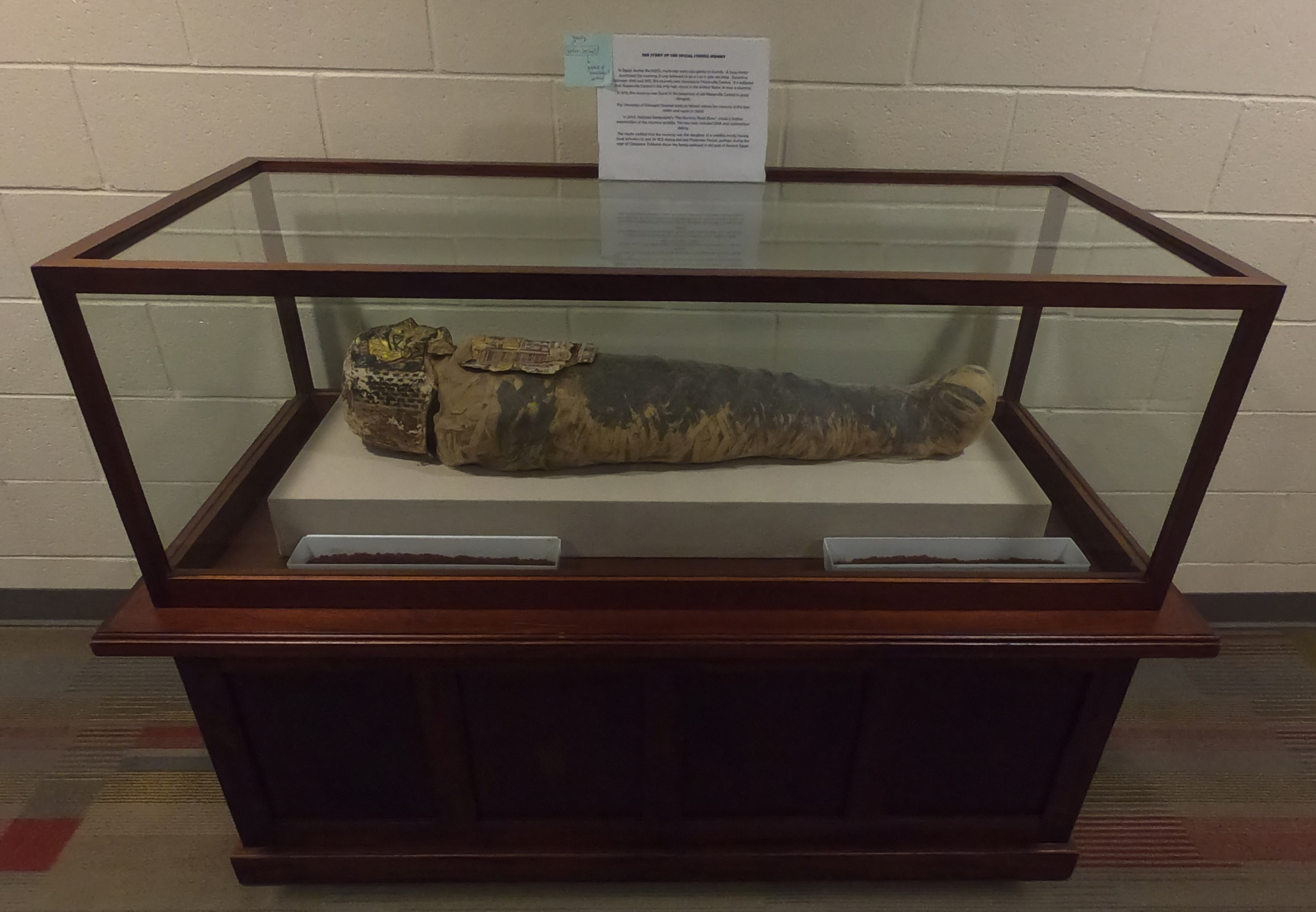
The Mummy at Naperville Central High School

One of the most notable displays at the school is an Egyptian mummy, also known as "Butch". It is stored in a glass case on the second floor of the school.

The mummy was donated in the 1940s by Dr. Winifred Martin of Naperville, who had apparently obtained it from an Egyptian curio shop. Martin donated the mummy to the local historical society, which later passed it on to the high school because the mummy had no place among exhibits devoted to local and American history. The mummy was wrapped up and forgotten in an attic at the school until it was accidentally rediscovered by a teacher in 1975. The mummy underwent restoration in the 1990s at the University of Chicago's Oriental Institute.

In 2002, the National Geographic Channel visited the school and featured the school's mummy on an episode of its Mummy Roadshow television series. The mummy dates to approximately 55 BCE.

== Demographics ==
In 2020, 67.0% of the student body identifies as White, 16.6% of the student body identifies as Asian, 8.5% of the student body identifies as Hispanic, 3.9% of the student body identifies as Black, and 4.0% of the student body identifies as another race.

== Academics ==
Seal of Naperville Central High School

In 2009, Naperville Central was ranked #1353 on the annual Newsweek Magazine listing of their top 1,500 American public high school (based on AP test results and the size of the graduating class). The school had been ranked #1015 in 2008.

== Student life ==
=== Athletics ===
Naperville Central competes in the DuPage Valley Conference (DVC), and is a member of the Illinois High School Association (IHSA), which governs most interscholastic athletics and competitive activities in the state. Teams are stylized as the Redhawks.

The school sponsors the following interscholastic teams for both boys and girls: lacrosse, basketball, cross country, golf, gymnastics, soccer, swimming & diving, tennis, track & field, volleyball, and water polo. Boys may compete in baseball, football, and wrestling, while girls may compete in badminton and softball. While not sponsored by the IHSA, the Athletic Department also oversees a competitive poms team.

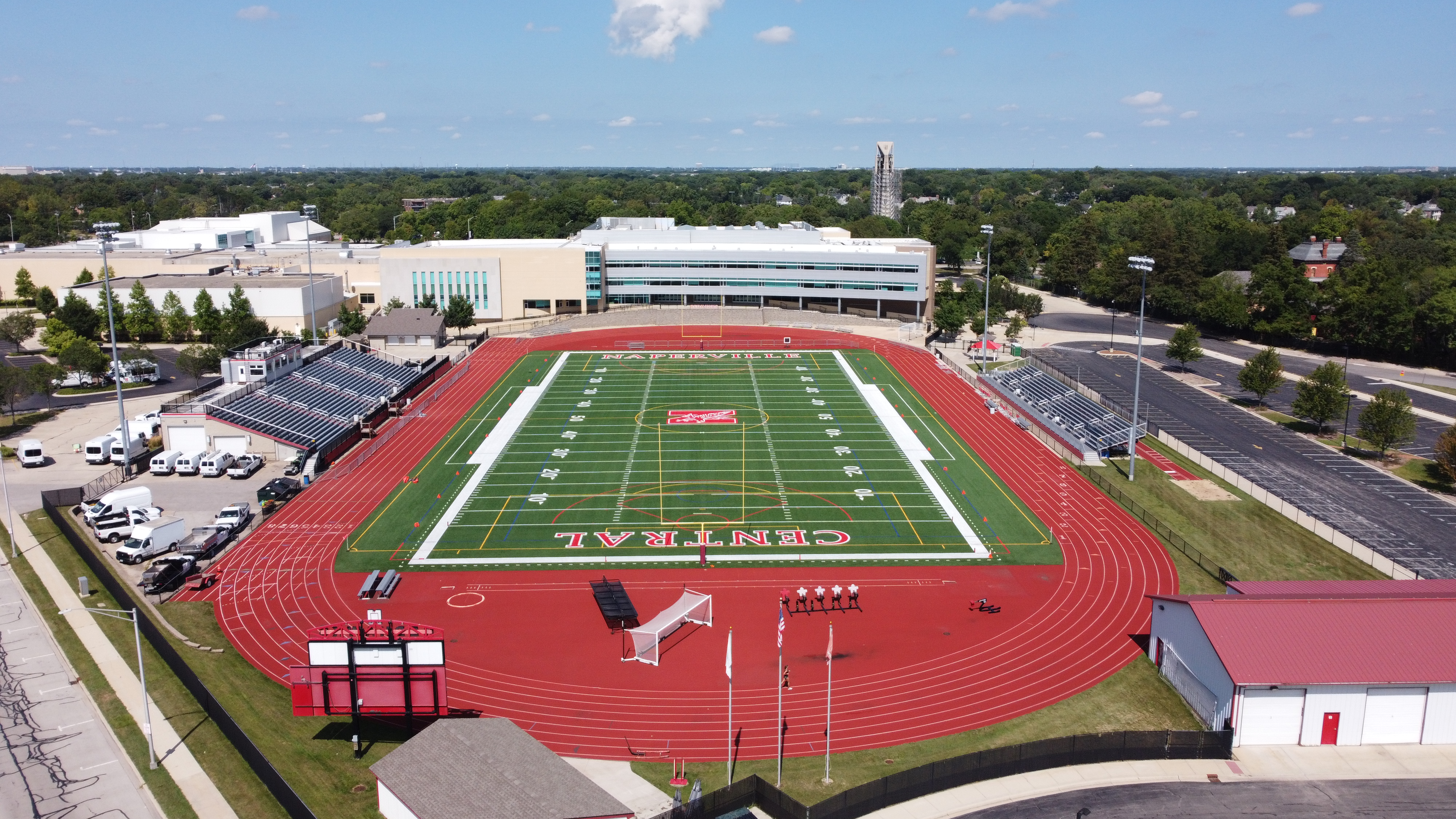
Memorial Stadium: Naperville Central's football field

The following teams have won their respective IHSA sponsored state tournament or meet:

- Baseball: 2005–06, 2009–10
- Basketball (girls): 2002–03, 2003–04
- Football: 1999–2000, 2013–14
- Swimming & Diving (boys): 2001–02, 2009–10
- Swimming & Diving (girls): 2004–05, 2005–06
- Tennis (boys): 2016–2017
- Tennis (girls): 1993–94
- Volleyball (boys): 1997–98
- Volleyball (girls): 2005–06, 2007–08
- Water Polo (boys): State Champions 2015–16, 2017–18, 2018-19

In 2010, the Redhawks achieved fame off of the playing field, as the NCHS football team appeared in country singer Kenny Chesney's music video "The Boys of Fall".

In 2021, the IHSA sanctioned the NCHS football team for violations of its transfer bylaws. The result of this sanction was the forfeiture of NCHS football games encompassing all wins in the 2018–19, 2019–20 and 2020–21 seasons, totaling 17 competitions where ineligible players participated. The school accepted full responsibility for their actions, and implemented revised procedures. Along with the football team, the basketball team also had to forfeit 4 wins in the 2018–19 season due to at least one ineligible player.

==== Science ====
The NCHS Science Olympiad Team, founded in 2004, ranked third in the state in 2005 and 2006 and second in state in 2007 and 2008(thus advancing to the national tournament). The Worldwide Youth in Science and Engineering Team won the State Championship in 2006, ending rival Naperville North's multiple-year winning streak. In 2009, Central's WYSE team captured first place at the regional competition held at Naperville North. The Varsity Junior Engineering Technical Society (JETS) TEAMS's team placed first in the nation in 2006; the JV JETS team placed second. In 2009, the Varsity JETS team took 1st place at the regional competition held at IIT (Wheaton Campus), while the JV team took 2nd.

In 2006, four students from NCHS competed in the Toshiba/NSTA Exploravision Competition and were recognized as 2nd Place National Finalist Winners for their design of a Wireless Information Integration network.

==== Chess ====
The NCHS chess team placed in 10th in 2010 and respectably in 2005 and 2006, and student Dafe Finster was the Individual State Champion in 2005.

==== Esports ====
The NCHS Esports Club has had several teams place in state throughout the years, spanning from 2019 to the present through the IHSEA.

The following teams have placed in state in their respective IHSEA state tournaments:

- Rocket League: The JV team made finals and Varsity team made semifinals in 2019.
- League of Legends: The JV team placed 2nd in 2022, and the Varsity team placed 4th in 2023.
- Super Smash Bros Ultimate: Players have made state in, 2023, 2024, and 2025.
- Valorant: Made Quarterfinals in 2022.
- Mario Kart 8 Deluxe: The Varsity team placed 7th in 2024.
- Pokemon Unite: The Varsity team made state in 2024.
- Splatoon 3: The Varsity team made top four in 2024

==== Journalism ====
The Central Times (CT) student newspaper has won many national National Pacemaker Awards, the high-school journalism version of the Pulitzer Prize. The CT also tied for first in the 2006 IHSA Journalism State competition as well as maintaining their title in 2010. CT staff members have received national awards for their writing, as well as awards from Columbia University.

== Notable alumni ==
- Dave Gruber Allen, actor
- Matthew John Armstrong (class of 1991), actor
- Mark Batterson (class of 1988), pastor and author
- Cameron Brate (class of 2010), NFL tight end
- John Clawson (class of 1963), former ABA small forward; Gold medalist at 1967 Pan American Games and 1968 Summer Olympics.
- Drew Crawford (class of 2009), small forward in the Israeli Basketball Premier League
- Owen Daniels (class of 2001), former NFL tight end, member of Super Bowl 50 champion Denver Broncos.
- Tudor Dixon (class of 1995), Republican candidate for Governor of Michigan in 2022
- David Eigenberg (class of 1982), actor, perhaps best known as Steve Brady on television series Sex and the City
- Tyler Jermann (class of 2010), distance runner, 4-time U.S. Olympic Trials qualifier in the marathon
- Darrien Johnson professional football player in the NFL and CFL
- Harry Kalas (class of 1954), Ford C. Frick Award-winning sportscaster, most notably with Philadelphia Phillies (1971–2009)
- Casey Krueger (class of 2008) professional soccer player for the United States women's national soccer team and the Chicago Red Stars
- Nicky Lopez (class of 2013), shortstop for MLB’s Chicago White Sox
- Elizabeth Lumpkin (class of 2004), former WTA Tour player and current head women's tennis coach at the University of Illinois-Chicago.
- Renato Mariotti (class of 1994), legal commentator and former federal prosecutor
- Gary Miller (class of 1974), former sportscaster for ESPN and current anchor at KCBS and KCAL in Los Angeles
- Mary Miller (class of 1977), U.S Representative for Illinois's 15th congressional district
- Nick Mondek (class of 2007), former NFL offensive lineman
- Anthony Parker (class of 1993), former NBA small forward; current general manager of NBA's Orlando Magic.
- Candace Parker (class of 2004), former WNBA power forward, 2x WNBA MVP, 2x Olympic gold medalist, current studio analyst for NBA on TNT
- Sean Payton (class of 1982), current head coach of NFL's Denver Broncos, winning coach of Super Bowl XLIV
- Mark Pearson (class of 1975), agricultural journalist on radio and television
- Jayden Reed (class of 2018), current wide receiver for NFL’s Green Bay Packers
- Emmanuel Rugamba (class of 2016), professional CFL player for the Edmonton Elks
- Paul Sereno (class of 1975), paleontologist
- Joe Swanberg (class of 1999), film director
- Tim Szatko (class of 1999), professional basketball player
- Payton Thorne (class of 2019), former quarterback for Auburn Tigers football
- Paula Zahn (class of 1974), television newscaster
- Robert Zoellick (class of 1971), government functionary and former President of World Bank (2007–2012)<ref>Waldorf, Tim; "New World Bank Head has Naperville Roots." Naperville Sun, 5 June

== Notable faculty ==
- Kelly Murphy, current assistant librarian; Olympic bronze medalist for the United States women’s national volleyball team.
