= List of people from Wheaton, Illinois =

This list includes notable people who were born or have lived in Wheaton, Illinois.

== Business ==
- Elbert Henry Gary (1846–1927), lawyer, county judge and founder of U.S. Steel
- Dan and Ada Rice (Daniel 1896–1975; Ada 1898–1977), businesspeople, Thoroughbred racehorse owners and breeders, and philanthropists; owners of Kentucky Derby winner Lucky Debonair

== Media and entertainment ==
- Shane Acker (born 1971), filmmaker and animator
- Jane Adams (born 1965), film, television, and theatre actress
- Selamawi Asgedom (born 1976), author of Of Beetles and Angels: A Boy's Remarkable Journey from a Refugee Camp to Harvard
- Bobbie Battista (born 1952), CNN anchor; attended high school in Wheaton
- Andrew Belle (born 1984), singer and songwriter
- Jim Belushi (born 1954), actor (According to Jim, K-9, Red Heat)
- John Belushi (1949–1982), actor (Saturday Night Live, The Blues Brothers, and Animal House)
- Wes Craven (1939–2015), horror film director (A Nightmare on Elm Street); alumnus of Wheaton College
- John Drury (1927–2007), Chicago television news anchor
- Dennis Dugan (born 1946), actor and director (Happy Gilmore, I Now Pronounce You Chuck and Larry)
- Tami Erin (born 1974), actress and model (The New Adventures of Pippi Longstocking)
- Danny Gonzalez (born 1994), YouTuber and former Viner
- A. Wilson Greene (born 1949), writer and historian
- Paul Hendrickson (born 1944), author, journalist and professor
- Clyde S. Kilby (1902–1986), author and professor at Wheaton College
- Ned Locke (1919–1992), Chicago TV and radio announcer
- Paul Maxey (1907–1963), actor who played character roles in films and television, starting in 1937
- Brian McCann (born 1965), actor, writer, and comedian
- Robert R. McCormick (1880–1955), publisher of the Chicago Tribune
- Joseph Medill (1823–1899), Mayor of Chicago; co-owner and managing editor of the Chicago Tribune
- Everett Mitchell (1898–1990), radio announcer
- Gail O'Grady (born 1963), actress (NYPD Blue, American Dreams)
- Lorraine Olivia (born 1968), November 1990 Playboy Playmate of the Month; graduated from Wheaton Central High School (1986)
- Kate Pierson (born 1948), lead singer of the B-52s, past spokesperson for People for the Ethical Treatment of Animals
- Janet Pilgrim (1934–2017), model and actress
- Rick Santelli (born 1953), on-air editor for the CNBC Business News cable network
- Sonal Shah (born 1980), actress (Scrubs)
- Sandra Smith (born 1980), reporter for Fox Business Network
- Bob Woodward (born 1943), author and reporter with The Washington Post; broke the Watergate scandal, co-writer of All the President's Men

== Military ==
- Mark S. Inch (born 1960), retired US Army Major General and ninth Director of the Federal Bureau of Prisons (2017–2018); graduate of Wheaton College; son of Morris Inch, Wheaton Professor
- Robert James Miller (1983–2008), US Army Special Forces staff sergeant; Medal of Honor recipient; graduate of Wheaton North High School
- James Howard Monroe (1944–1967), US Army PFC; Medal of Honor recipient; graduate of Wheaton Central High School; namesake of James Howard Monroe Middle School

== Music ==
- Andrew Belle (born 1984), musician
- Steve Camp (born 1955), Christian singer
- Blake Judd (born 1982), musician; lead vocalist of Nachtmystium
- Ryan O'Neal (born 1983), musician; Sleeping at Last

== Politics and law ==
- Ralph H. Barger (1923–2002), Illinois state legislator and mayor of Wheaton
- Joe Birkett (born 1955), Illinois Appellate Court justice; former DuPage County State's Attorney
- George Peter Foster (1858–1928), U.S. Congressman from Illinois, 3rd and 4th districts
- Amy Grant, member of the Illinois House of Representatives (2019–present)
- William L. Guild (1910–1993), Illinois Attorney General and jurist
- Randy Hultgren (born 1966), U.S. congressman, represented Illinois's 14th congressional district from 2011 to 2019.
- Jeanne Ives (born 1964), Illinois state legislator (2013–2018), and candidate for Governor of Illinois (2018).
- Robert Jauch (born 1945), Wisconsin state legislator
- John McCandish King (1927–2016), member of the Illinois House of Representatives; between 1951–2015, he held the record as the youngest person to serve in the Illinois General Assembly
- Prentice Marshall (1926–2004), U.S. District Judge for the Northern District of Illinois (1973–1996)
- Lewis V. Morgan (1929–2018), American judge, lawyer, and politician
- Evelyn Sanguinetti (born 1970), Lieutenant Governor of Illinois
- Albert W. Sherer Jr. (born 1916), American diplomat, Ambassador to the United Nations under President Gerald Ford, author of Human Rights Pact at Helsinki
- Samuel K. Skinner (born 1938), U.S. Secretary of Transportation and White House Chief of Staff under President George H. W. Bush

== Religion ==
- Jonathan Blanchard (1811–1892), pastor, educator, social reformer, and abolitionist; founder of Wheaton College
- Jim Elliot (1927–1956), evangelical Christian missionary to Ecuador who was killed while evangelizing to the Waodani people; alumnus of Wheaton College
- Billy Graham (1918–2018), Christian evangelist; alumnus of Wheaton College
- R. Kent Hughes (born 1942), author; pastor Emeritus of College Church
- Isobel Miller Kuhn (1901–1957), Canadian missionary to the Lisu people of Yunnan Province, China, and northern Thailand
- John R. Rice (1895–1980), Baptist evangelist and journalist
- Miles J. Stanford (1914–1999), Christian author
- Kenneth N. Taylor (1917–2005), translator of The Living Bible and founder of Tyndale House Publishers
- Phil Vischer (born 1966), creator of the children's show VeggieTales

== Science and design ==
- Edwin Hubble (1889–1953), astronomer after whom the Hubble Space Telescope is named
- Jarvis Hunt (1863–1941), architect and designer of Chicago Golf Club's clubhouse in Wheaton
- Grote Reber (1911–2002), amateur astronomer, radio engineer and pioneer of radio astronomy

== Sports ==
=== Baseball ===
- Herb Adams (1928–2012), outfielder for Chicago White Sox
- Don Bollweg (1921–1996), first baseman for St. Louis Cardinals, New York Yankees, and Philadelphia/Kansas City Athletics
- Mike Joyce (born 1941), pitcher for Chicago White Sox
- Chet Lemon (born 1955), outfielder for Chicago White Sox and Detroit Tigers; World Series champion (1984)
- J.C. Martin (born 1936), catcher for New York Mets, and Chicago Cubs; World Series champion (1969)
- Dave Otto (born 1964), pitcher for Chicago Cubs, Oakland Athletics, Cleveland Indians, Pittsburgh Pirates, and Chicago White Sox; sports broadcaster
- Milt Pappas (1939–2016), pitcher for Baltimore Orioles, Cincinnati Reds, Atlanta Braves, and Chicago Cubs
- Jimmy Piersall (1929–2017), outfielder for Boston Red Sox, broadcaster for Chicago White Sox, lived and died in Wheaton
- Lee Pfund (1919–2016), pitcher for Brooklyn Dodgers
- Sy Sutcliffe (1862–1893), catcher for Baltimore Orioles and Washington Statesmen
- Ollie Voigt (1899–1970), pitcher for St Louis Browns

=== Basketball ===
- Katie Meier (born 1967), head coach of University of Miami women's basketball team
- Randy Pfund (born 1951), former head coach of NBA's Los Angeles Lakers and General Manager of Miami Heat

=== Boxing ===
- Mike Lee (born 1987), light heavyweight boxer

=== Football ===
- Jon Beutjer (born 1980), former professional football quarterback in the Arena Football League and Canadian Football League
- Corey Davis (born 1995), NFL wide receiver for the New York Jets
- Titus Davis (1993–2020), former American professional football player who was a wide receiver
- Scott Dierking (born 1955), former NFL running back
- Rick Fox, football head coach, Drake University
- Kent Graham (born 1968), quarterback for eight NFL teams; 1986 National High School Quarterback of the Year at Wheaton North
- Garland Grange (1906–1981), former Chicago Bears player and younger brother of Red Grange
- Harold "Red" Grange (1903–1991), running back for the Chicago Bears and New York Yankees (NFL); known as "the Wheaton Ice Man"
- A. J. Harris (born 1984), former Canadian football running back
- Pete Ittersagen (born 1985), former NFL and CFL cornerback
- Rick Johnson (born 1961), former CFL quarterback, actor and director
- Jim Juriga (born 1964), former guard for the Denver Broncos
- Tim Lester (born 1977), head football coach at Western Michigan University, from 2017–2022
- Chuck Long (born 1963), College Football Hall of Fame quarterback; offensive coordinator of University of Kansas football
- Tony Moeaki (born 1987), tight end for the Kansas City Chiefs and Buffalo Bills
- Todd Monken (born 1966), head coach of the Cleveland Browns
- Matt Rahn (born 1982), retired American football player and since 2020, the acting head coach of the College of DuPage Chaparrals football team
- Steve Thonn, American football coach
- Clayton Thorson (born 1995), American football quarterback who is a free agent
- Danny Vitale (born 1993), former American football fullback
- Bob Zeman (1937–2019), defensive back for the San Diego Chargers and Denver Broncos, later coach for several college and professional teams

=== Golf ===
- Charles B. Macdonald (1855–1939), golfer; built the first 18-hole course in the US
- Kevin Streelman (born 1978), golfer on the PGA Tour
- Mark O'Meara (born 1957), golfer on the PGA Tour

=== Hockey ===
- Alain Chevrier (born 1961), goaltender for five NHL teams
- Jacques Cloutier (born 1960), goaltender for the Buffalo Sabres, Chicago Blackhawks, and Quebec Nordiques
- Ryan Dzingel (born 1992), forward for five NHL teams
- Bobby Hull (1939–2023), forward for the Chicago Blackhawks
- Darren Pang (born 1964), goaltender for the Chicago Blackhawks; commentator for the Chicago Blackhawks
- Wayne Presley (born 1965), right wing for five NHL teams
- Denis Savard (born 1961), Hockey Hall of Fame centre and head coach for the Chicago Blackhawks, Montreal Canadiens, and Tampa Bay Lightning
- Trent Yawney (born 1965), defenceman for the Chicago Blackhawks, Calgary Flames, and St. Louis Blues

=== Olympics ===
- Adam Harris (born 1987), Olympic sprinter
- Thomas Jaeschke (born 1993), Olympic volleyball outside hitter; two-time bronze medalist
- Sean Rooney (born 1982), Olympic volleyball outside hitter; gold medalist
- Jim Spivey (born 1960), three-time Olympic 1500 meter and 5000 meter track and field athlete
- Nancy Swider-Peltz (born 1956), Olympic speedskater (1976, 1980, 1984, 1988); mother of Nancy Jr.
- Nancy Swider-Peltz Jr. (born 1987), Winter Olympian speed skater (2010)

=== Soccer ===
- Charlie Fajkus (born 1957), former professional soccer midfielder

=== Tennis ===
- Tim Gullikson (1951–1996), tennis player; coach of no. 1 ranked Pete Sampras; lived in Wheaton
