= Juriga =

Juriga is a surname. Notable people with the surname include:

- Jim Juriga (born 1964), American football guard
- Luke Juriga (born 1997), American football center

== See also ==
- Juriga's Slovak People's Party, political party in Slovakia
