= The National Farm and Home Hour =

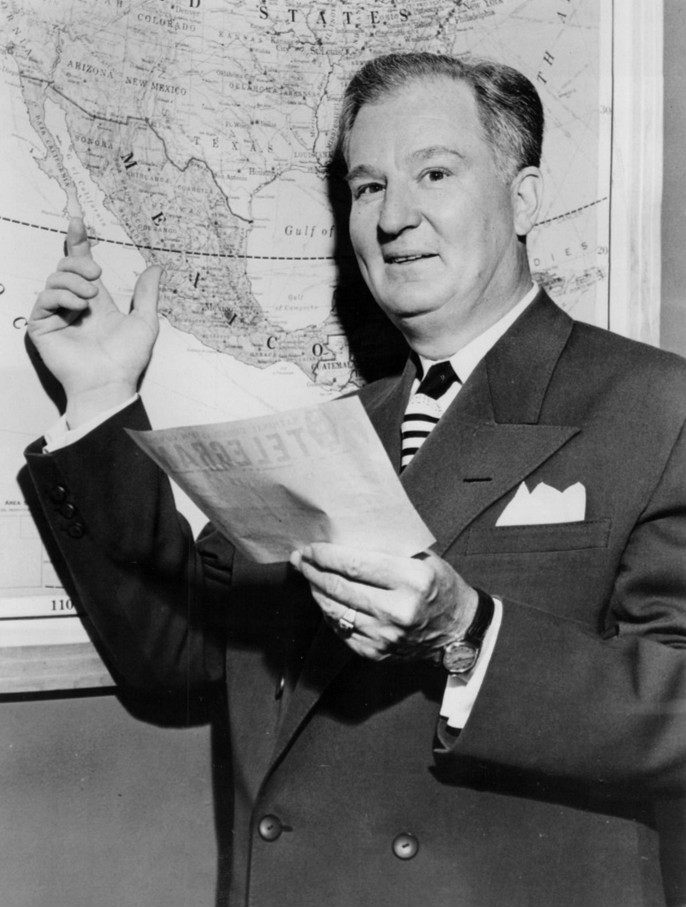
Everett Mitchell, host of The National Farm and Home Hour

The National Farm and Home Hour was a variety show that was broadcast in various formats from 1928 to 1958. Aimed at listeners in rural America, it was known as "the farmer's bulletin board" and was produced by the United States Department of Agriculture with contributions from, and the cooperation of, various farm organizations (among them the American Farm Bureau, 4-H Club, Farmers Union, Future Farmers of America and the National Grange). Raymond Edward Johnson, and later Don Ameche, appeared in dramatic sketches in the role of the Forest Ranger.

The program debuted on October 2, 1928.

With live coverage of livestock expositions, harvest festivals and "the most spectacular happenings in agricultural America," the program offered tips to farmers, music and news, plus advice from agencies and government officials.

The series first aired on Pittsburgh's KDKA (1928–29), moving to the Blue Network (later ABC) from September 30, 1929, to March 17, 1945. Originating from WMAQ in Chicago, it was usually heard Monday through Saturday at 12:30 EST. Under the sponsorship of Allis-Chalmers, it continued on NBC as a 30-minute show on Saturdays at noon EST from September 15, 1945 to January 25, 1958; in its final three years (1955–58), it would be incorporated into the Saturday lineup of NBC's weekend anthology Monitor.

Host Everett Mitchell opened each broadcast with his trademark line, "It's a beautiful day in Chicago!", which became a familiar catch phrase. He began using the introduction on May 14, 1932. During World War II, when the federal government prohibited broadcasting information about weather conditions, Mitchell was allowed to continue using the opening.
