= Wheaton Warrenville South High School =

High school in Wheaton, Illinois

Location
- 1993 Tiger Trail; Wheaton, (DuPage County), Illinois 60189; United States; 41°49′58″N 88°08′56″W

Information
- School type: Public secondary school
- Motto: Latin: Semper Tigris (Always a Tiger)
- Opened: 1876; 150 years ago
- School district: Community Unit School District 200
- Superintendent: Jeff Schuler
- CEEB code: 144380
- Principal: Lorie Campos
- Teaching staff: 128.55 (FTE) (2022–23)
- Grades: 9–12
- Gender: Coed
- Enrollment: 1,845 (2022–23)
- Average class size: 23.7
- Student to teacher ratio: 14.35 (2022–23)
- Campus type: Large suburban
- Colors: Orange; Black
- Slogan: Commitment, Integrity, Scholarship, Tradition
- Athletics conference: DuKane Conference
- Mascot: Tom
- Nickname: Tigers
- Accreditation: NACAC, IACAC
- Publication: South Spoken
- Newspaper: The Pride
- Yearbook: Tigris
- Website: www.cusd200.org/o/wheatonwarrenvillesouth
- Last updated: April 30, 2019; 7 years ago

Wheaton Warrenville South High School (WWSHS), locally referred to as "South", is a public four-year high school in Wheaton, Illinois. It is one of two high schools part of Community Unit School District 200, the other being Wheaton North High School.

The school has had a long history, during which it has had three names, and is considered the successor to a school with a similar name. The school is known for its academic and athletic accomplishments, its alumni include astronomer Edwin Hubble, comedian John Belushi and actor Jim Belushi.

== History ==
The history of Wheaton Warrenville High School can be traced back to the original high school in Wheaton, Wheaton High School, which opened in 1876. In 1925, the school was relocated to a new building which would eventually become Hubble Middle School, and changed its name to Wheaton Community High School.

In October 1946, the school's cafeteria was largely destroyed by a fire that was blamed on a recently installed Coca-Cola vending machine.

In 1964, with the completion of its sister school, Wheaton North, the school was again renamed, Wheaton Central High School.

By 1967, overcrowding became an issue at Wheaton Central. In late 1967, the school board proposed a redistricting move that would send all Warrenville students to the newer Wheaton North building. In January 1968, the board approved bussing underclass students in Warrenville to Wheaton North, and allowing upperclassmen the choice of either school.

The current building that houses Wheaton Warrenville South was opened in 1973, and operated as Wheaton-Warrenville High School from 1973 to 1983. By 1982, it was clear that the high school population in the district was shrinking, and there would be a need to close either the older, tradition rich Wheaton Central, or the newer, but smaller Wheaton-Warrenville. In June 1982, the school board voted 6–1 to close Wheaton-Warrenville High School, effective at the end of the 1982–83 school year. In response, there was a request for a mass transfer of all students from Wheaton-Warrenville High to either of the two other schools, and forcing more changes at the other schools. When the request for the mass transfer was not granted by the board, a group of Warrenville parents began threatening to secede from the district. In January 1983, the parent group presented a petition signed by over 75% of the registered voters of Warrenville to approve detaching from the district. The movement to split from the district eventually moved to the courts. Without even hearing the school board's argument, the judge ruled against the parents group. The issue finally came to an end when the DuPage Valley Regional Board of School Trustees voted 5–2 to reject the secession bid.

In 1983, the original Wheaton-Warrenville High School became Wheaton Warrenville Middle School, reflecting a shrinking high school population and an increasing population of younger students.

In 1988, with Wheaton Central aging, the board moved to renovate Wheaton Warrenville Middle School in preparation for opening it again as a high school, when Wheaton Central would need to eventually be closed. In October 1989, the school board formally proposed moving high school students from Wheaton Central back to Wheaton-Warrenville Middle School, and converting the older Wheaton Central building to a middle school. On May 9, 1990, the board officially voted to make the change, ending a situation that had again "divided residents". Even after the decision was made, there was debate over the naming of the school. In 1992, with an increase in the district's high school population, there was a need to move the high school population from the older 1925 building to the newer, larger 1973 building. The 1925 building became Hubble Middle School, and upon moving, Wheaton Central High School became Wheaton Warrenville South High School. Thus, the original Wheaton-Warrenville High School is considered the forerunner of the current Wheaton Warrenville South High School (not the same school). This can be seen in the evolution of the school seal which came from WCHS. The school colors, mascot, and nickname are continuations of Wheaton Central.

It is proper to write the name of the earlier school as Wheaton-Warrenville High School, with a hyphen. When the school was renamed, the hyphen was dropped to symbolize a lack of division. The hyphen in the original name implied a separation between the two communities, and also suggested that the school was not fully a part of either community, and instead existed as a separate entity between them.

By removing the hyphen, the school is effectively signaling that it is no longer separating the two communities, and instead is fully a part of both. The new name, Wheaton Warrenville South High School, does not emphasize the separation between Wheaton and Warrenville, but instead the coming together of the two communities.

In this way, the removal of the hyphen can be seen as a symbol of unity and a lack of division between the two communities. It may be used to represent the school's desire to bring the community together, to bridge the gap and make a stronger connection. It may also reflect the school's efforts to create an inclusive and harmonious environment for all students and staff, regardless of their background.

The 1925 building housing Hubble Middle School was closed at the end of the 2008–09 school year. A new Hubble Middle School was constructed, and the site has been demolished and turned into a supermarket called Mariano's.

== Architecture ==
The building comprises five major pods: Grange, completed in 2005, and Tradition, Scholarship, Commitment, and Integrity, which are taken from the school seal.

In 1999, the Integrity wing was built in the southeast corner of the school to house the math department. It includes eleven new classrooms, a math lab, and a math office.

In 2002, The Tradition and Commitment pods, primarily housing the English and Science departments, respectively, underwent significant renovations with reconstruction of all second floor classrooms. More than $100,000 worth of technology was also upgraded in 2002, with all classrooms receiving at least one new Dell XP computer connecting to a new broadband internet access connection, cable TV, accompanying DVD/VCR combo player. The computer labs were also updated and several carts of wireless internet laptops were added.

Wheaton Warrenville South installed solar panels on the roof of the school as an alternative energy source as part of a 2004 partnership with British Petroleum. BP's North American Chemical headquarters is located approximately two miles south of the school in Naperville. The remaining energy comes from Commonwealth Edison, which primarily produces energy from nuclear and fossil fuel sources.

On April 1, 2003, residents of Community Unit School District 200 approved, by a vote of 10,173 to 6,518, a $72 million bond referendum to add about 150,000 square feet (14,000 m^{2}) of space and renovate both Wheaton Warrenville South, and its counterpart, Wheaton North.

The first phase of construction began in August 2003 and was completed in March 2005 and included 21 new classrooms with two resource centers to house the English and Foreign Language departments, two art rooms, a band room, an orchestra room, a choral room, and nine sound-proof practice rooms. In addition, the central office area was reconverted for the counseling center and the health office, while all other administrative offices were moved to the front of the building. A new commons area was constructed and the cafeteria underwent significant renovations.

The second phase began in spring 2005 and was completed by May 2006 and consisted primarily of renovations to the athletics wing and the construction of the field house. The library has undergone significant renovations during summer of 2006.

== Academics ==
According to the 2017–18 Illinois Report Card, Wheaton Warrenville South has a 95% graduation rate; 85% of graduates enroll in a two-year or four-year college within 12 months of graduation. Wheaton Warrenville South has earned an "A+" Rating for Academics according to Niche independent ratings. Wheaton Warrenville South was #21 (IL) on U.S. News & World Report 2018 Best High Schools list.

All academic classes at South are divided into two difficulty levels: Intermediate (I level) and Advanced (A level)/AP. The school has a weighted GPA system in which there is a 4.0 scale for I-level classes and a 5.0 scale for A and AP-level classes. The school offers 17 Advanced Placement courses; 31% of students are enrolled in AP classes. In 2018, Community Unit School District 200 was one of 447 school districts in the U.S. and Canada honored by the College Board with placement on the Annual AP District Honor Roll.

In 2018, Money Magazine rated the community as #27 on their National "Best Places To Live 2018" ranking [#1 in Illinois], citing "The school district in town consistently ranks among the best in the state—one reason Wheaton has made repeat appearances on Money's Best Places to Live rankings over the years."

== Student life ==
=== Athletics ===
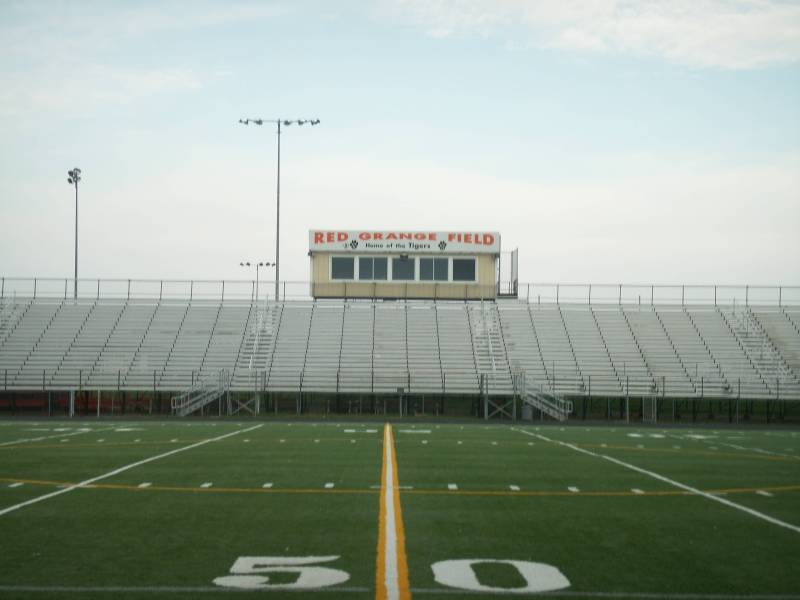
Grange Field at WWSHS is named for "the Galloping Ghost", alum Red Grange

WWSHS competes in the DuKane Conference as of the 2018–2019 school year. Wheaton Warrenville South is also a member of the Illinois High School Association (IHSA), which oversees most sports and competitive activities in the state.

The school sponsors interscholastic athletic teams for young men and women in: basketball, cross country, golf, gymnastics, lacrosse, soccer, swimming & diving, tennis, track & field, and volleyball. Young men may also compete in baseball, football, volleyball, and wrestling, while young women may compete in badminton, cheerleading, and softball. While not sponsored by the IHSA, the school also sponsors an teams for ice hockey and dance.

The following teams have finished in the top four of their respective IHSA sponsored state tournament or meet:

- Cross Country (boys):State Champions (2018–2019)
- Football: semifinalists State Champions (1992–93, 1995–96, 1996–97, 1998–99, 2006–07, 2009–10, 2010–11)
- Golf (girls): State Champions (2016–17)
- Gymnastics (boys): State Champions (2004–05, 2011–12, 2012–13, 2013–14, 2023–24)
- Track & Field (boys):State Champions (1995–96, 1998–99)
- Volleyball (boys):State Champions (2001, 2004, 2005, 2007, 2008, 2009, 2012); 2012 ESPN National Champions

As of the end of the 2011–12 season, the seven state titles for WWS in boys volleyball is a state record.

As of the end of the 2010–11 season, the seven state titles in football is the fifth highest total in state history, and the highest among public schools.

=== Activities ===
There are over 30 student activities ranging from athletic and artistic to social awareness and academic interests; and entire list of which can be seen here . Among those which are affiliates or chapters of nationally recognized groups are: Key Club, National Art Honor Society, and National Honor Society.

There are typically four different student theatrical productions each year: a novice production in the early autumn, a play in late autumn, a variety show in early spring, and a musical in the last month before the end of the school year.

The school also sponsors a number of music groups including a jazz ensemble, pep band, and marching band. In addition to a general choir, there are two show choirs (The Classics and Esprit). The Classics (mixed gender) won the FAME National Championship in 2011 and again in 2012. The Esprit team (unisex) is affiliated with the school and became school sponsored as of the 2017–18 season.

In the 2022–23 school year, the school's fledgling esports team had a successful season, winning first and second place in the Illinois High School Esports Association's individual Fortnite season.

The following competitive activities have finished in the top four of their respective IHSA sponsored state championship tournament or meet:

- Marching band: State Champions (1998–99), (1999–2000), (2003–04), (2004–05) 2nd Place (2005–06)
- Speech: State Champions (1940–41, 2013–14)
- Group Interpretation: State Champions (1981–82)
- Individual Events State Champions (1968–69, 1981–82, 1982–83, 1989–90, 1997–98, 1998–99, 1999–2000, 2001–02, 2013–14, 2020–2021, 2022–23)

== Notable alumni ==
=== Wheaton High School (1876–1925) ===
- C. Wayland Brooks (class of 1916), U.S. senator (1940–49)
- Harold "Red" Grange (class of 1922), college and NFL halfback. He is a member of both the Pro Football Hall of Fame and College Football Hall of Fame. His uniform No. 77 was retired by the University of Illinois and the Chicago Bears. WWSHS's football field is named in his honor.
- Edwin Hubble (class of 1906), astronomer who determined the existence of galaxies beyond the Milky Way, and proposed Hubble's law, which helped in postulating the expanding universe theory. The Hubble Space Telescope was named in his honor.

=== Wheaton Community High School (1925–1964) ===
- Dennis Dugan (class of 1964), actor and director (I Now Pronounce You Chuck and Larry, You Don't Mess with the Zohan)
- James H. Monroe (class of 1963), U.S. Army combat medic during the Vietnam War. He received the Medal of Honor when he saved lives by throwing himself on a live grenade.
- William Rathje (class of 1963), archaeologist, best known as "Professor of Garbology", while heading the Tucson Garbage Project at the University of Arizona
- Grote Reber (class of 1929), amateur astronomer, constructed one of the first radio telescopes in his Wheaton backyard, and conducted the first radio survey of the sky
- Samuel K. Skinner (class of 1956), U.S. Secretary of Transportation (1989–91) and Chief of Staff for President George H. W. Bush (1991–92)
- Mike Taliaferro (class of c. 1959), former collegiate and professional American football quarterback who led third-ranked Illinois to the 1964 Rose Bowl win over Washington
- Orrin Tucker (class of 1929), bandleader
- Bob Woodward (class of 1961), investigative reporter and author who works for The Washington Post. He is best known for his collaboration with reporter Carl Bernstein in uncovering the Watergate scandal.
- Bob Zeman, American Football League defensive back

=== Wheaton Central High School (1964–1992) ===
- Robert Jauch (class of 1963) Wisconsin state legislator
- John Belushi (class of 1967), comedian and actor known for his work on television (Saturday Night Live) and in film (Animal House, The Blues Brothers)
- Jim Belushi (class of 1972), comedian and actor best known for his work in film (Salvador, K-9) and television (Saturday Night Live, According to Jim)
- Rob DeVita (class of 1983) gridiron football player
- Matt Leacock (class of 1989), board game designer best known for cooperative games such as Pandemic.
- Katie Meier (Class of 1985), college women's basketball coach, all-time winningest basketball coach – men's or women's – at University of Miami.
- Jeff Thorne (Class of 1989), College football coach, won a Division 3 National Championship as the head coach of the North Central Cardinals.

=== Wheaton Warrenville South High School (1992–present) ===
- Cory Barlog (class of 1993), director and writer in the entertainment industry. He was a writer and director for the God of War video game series, creative consultant on the unreleased Mad Max reboot game. In March 2012, it was announced that Barlog joined Crystal Dynamics to direct the cinematics for the new Tomb Raider game and go on to direct an unannounced game.
- Jon Beutjer (class of 1999), former professional football quarterback who has played in the Arena Football League and Canadian Football League
- Dustin Byfuglien (attended 2000–01, did not graduate from WWSHS), former NHL defenseman. He won the Stanley Cup with the Chicago Blackhawks in 2010.
- Jerome Collins (class of 2000), former NFL tight end; 2x Super Bowl Champion (XLI, XLII)
- Corey Davis (class of 2013), former NFL wide receiver; fifth overall pick of 2017 NFL draft; NCAA career receiving yards leader.
- Titus Davis (class of 2011), former NFL wide receiver
- Tony Moeaki (class of 2005), free agent NFL tight end; drafted in 3rd round of 2010 NFL draft by Kansas City Chiefs. WWS received a gold football as part of the NFL's High School Honor Roll program during the Super Bowl 50 celebration for having a player (Moeaki) in one of the first 49 Super Bowls (Super Bowl XLIX).
- Jason Rezaian (attended 1990–1992) a Washington Post journalist who was imprisoned for 545 days in Iran after being accused of Espionage
- Sean Rooney (class of 2001), professional volleyball player in Europe and Asia. He was a member of the gold medal-winning team for the United States at the 2008 Summer Olympics.
- Sonal Shah (class of 1998), actress, best known for her role as Dr. Sonja "Sunny" Day on the television series Scrubs
- Sandra Smith (class of 1998), television reporter for Fox Business Network
- Kevin Streelman (class of 1997), professional golfer on the PGA Tour
- Dan Vitale (class of 2012), former fullback for Green Bay Packers; drafted in the 6th round (197th overall) of the 2016 NFL draft
