= Symbria =

Healthcare company

Symbria is a healthcare company that provides rehabilitation services, wellness programs, pharmacy services, experience surveys, and strategic consulting services to senior-living and post-acute providers across the United States.

Symbria's headquarters is located in Warrenville, Illinois.

== History ==
Symbria was founded in 1995. Jill Krueger has served as president and CEO since its founding. Symbria was previously known as Health Resources Alliance.

In October 2015, Symbria became an Employee Stock Owned company.
