= Warrenville, Illinois =

- City
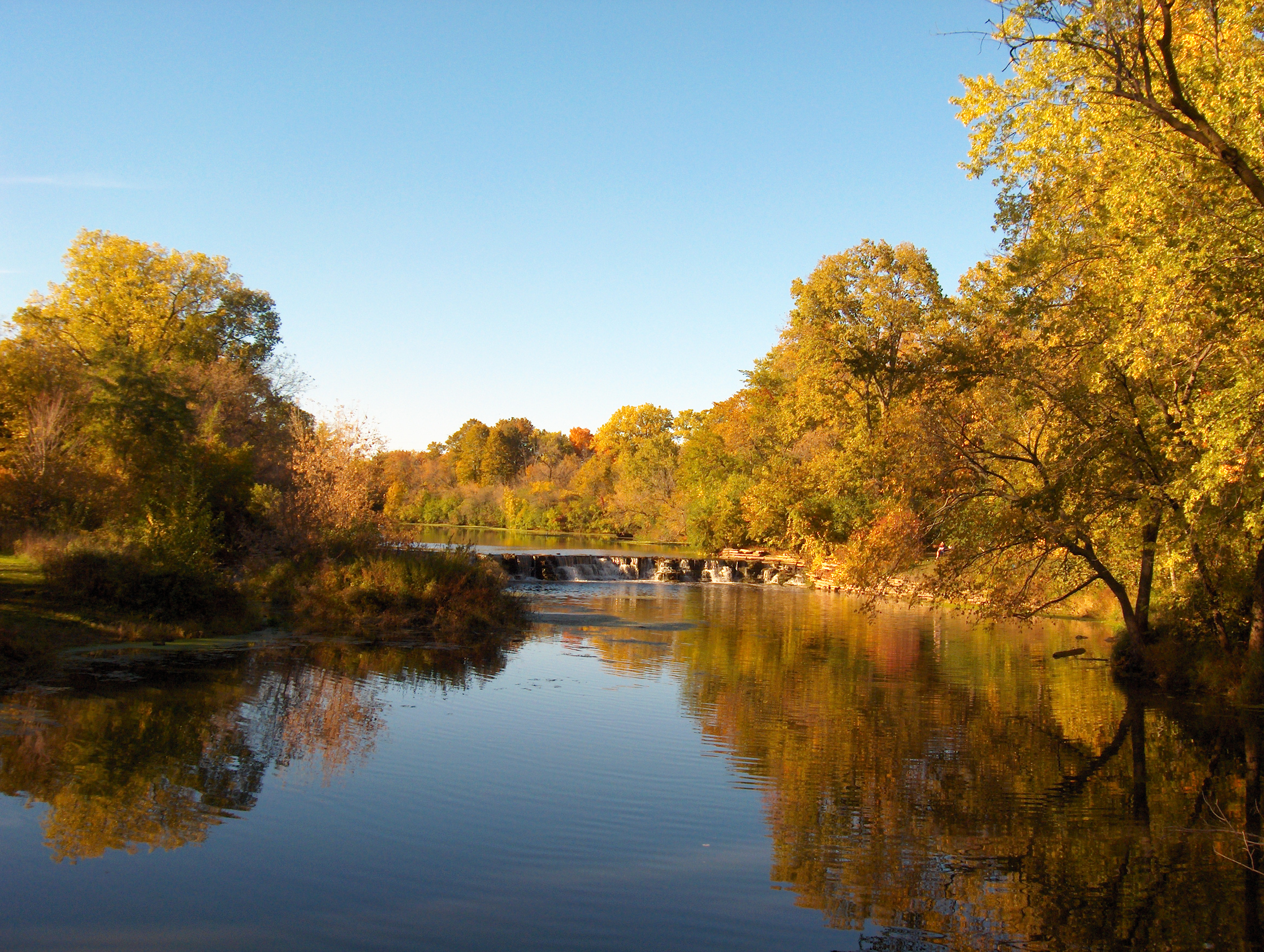
- Warrenville Grove Forest Preserve on the West Branch of the DuPage River, where Julius Warren claimed land in 1833.

- Flag Logo

- Location within DuPage County and Illinois
- Coordinates: 41°49′15″N 88°11′08″W
- Country: United States
- State: Illinois
- County: DuPage
- Townships: Winfield, Naperville
- Incorporated: 1967

Government
  - Type: Mayor–council

Area
  - Total: 5.61 sq mi (14.53 km^{2})
  - Land: 5.46 sq mi (14.14 km^{2})
  - Water: 0.15 sq mi (0.39 km^{2}) 2.85%
- Elevation: 702 ft (214 m)

Population (2020)
  - Total: 13,553
  - Density: 2,482.4/sq mi (958.46/km^{2})

Standard of living
  - Per capita income: $28,922 (median: $62,430)
  - Home value: $163,314 (median: $148,900 (2000))
- Time zone: UTC-6 (CST)
  - Summer (DST): UTC-5 (CDT)
- ZIP code: 60555
- Area code(s): 630 and 331
- FIPS code: 17-78929
- GNIS feature ID: 2397197
- Website: www.warrenville.il.us

Warrenville is a city in DuPage County, Illinois, United States. The population was 15,195 at the 2024 special census. Warrenville is a far west suburb of Chicago on the DuPage River. It is part of the Illinois Technology and Research Corridor, and is just north of I-88.

== History ==
Warrenville was founded in 1833 when Julius Warren and his family moved west from New York to seek a fresh start from a failing gristmill and distillery. Daniel Warren, Julius' father, claimed land at what is now McDowell Woods and Julius claimed land at what is now the Warrenville Grove Forest Preserve. The first major establishment, an inn and tavern, was built in 1838 by Julius Warren himself, as the family was skilled in timber and grain. The inn still stands today and was renovated in 2002.

The town quickly blossomed with two mills and a plank road connecting it with Naperville and Winfield, on which Julius operated a stagecoach line. The town failed at its bid to have the railroad come through the town. However, in 1902, the Chicago Aurora and Elgin Railroad came through town, which lasted until the late 1950s.

With a population of 4,000, Warrenville was finally incorporated as a city in 1967, following six unsuccessful attempts. The 1970s and 1980s brought westward expansion from the city of Chicago, causing the small farming community's population to nearly double to 7,800.

== Geography ==
According to the 2010 census, Warrenville has a total area of 5.618 square miles (14.55 km^{2}), of which 5.46 square miles (14.14 km^{2}) (or 97.19%) is land and 0.158 square miles (0.41 km^{2}) (or 2.81%) is water.

=== Neighborhoods ===
There is an "old neighborhood", south, with mixed housing styles near Galusha Avenue. There is a Forest Preserve neighborhood, east, with wooded-lot expensive multi-acre homes close to Cantigny War Museum, Cantigny Golf Course, and Mckee Marsh. In the mid-1970s two large subdivisions were developed in the west, next to Fermilab, a scientific research center where the world's largest superconducting particle accelerator ring was located. The subdivisions are called Summerlakes and Fox Hollow. Other notable subdivisions of Warrenville include Warrenville Lakes, Timber Creek, Saddle Ridge, Thornwilde, Edgebrook, River Oaks, and Maple Hill.

==== Cantera ====
Cantera was built from a TIF district on the former grounds 650-acre (2.6 km^{2}) limestone quarry. Located on the district is a 17-screen movie theater (formerly 30-screen), family entertainment center, several restaurants, a big box retail store, three hotels, three banks, a fitness club, numerous corporate offices, and two residential complexes. Major companies that have office space and research facilities at Cantera include: BP America, the corporate office for EN Engineering, the corporate headquarters for Symbria, and a corporate office for Exelon Nuclear. Also, the headquarters of the International Brotherhood of Electrical Workers (IBEW) Local 701 of DuPage County is in Cantera.

==== Downtown ====
Downtown Warrenville is located at the intersection of Butterfield Road and Batavia Road. The addition of another TIF district, a new police station was built in 1998, a new City Hall in 2001, a new Public Works Building in 2002, and additions were made to the library in 2003/2017.

== Demographics ==
Historical population
Census	Pop.	Note	%±
1950	1,891		—
1960	3,134		65.7%
1970	3,281		4.7%
1980	7,519		129.2%
1990	11,333		50.7%
2000	13,363		17.9%
2010	13,140		−1.7%
2020	13,553		3.1%
U.S. Decennial Census

=== Racial and ethnic composition ===
Warrenville city, Illinois – Racial and ethnic composition Note: the US Census treats Hispanic/Latino as an ethnic category. This table excludes Latinos from the racial categories and assigns them to a separate category. Hispanics/Latinos may be of any race.
Race / Ethnicity (NH = Non-Hispanic)	Pop 2000	Pop 2010	Pop 2020	% 2000	% 2010	% 2020
White alone (NH)	11,106	9,176	8,648	83.11%	69.83%	63.81%
Black or African American alone (NH)	304	501	386	2.27%	3.81%	2.85%
Native American or Alaska Native alone (NH)	17	22	18	0.13%	0.17%	0.13%
Asian alone (NH)	458	482	676	3.43%	3.67%	4.99%
Pacific Islander alone (NH)	5	3	3	0.04%	0.02%	0.02%
Other race alone (NH)	9	22	40	0.07%	0.17%	0.30%
Mixed race or Multiracial (NH)	115	182	536	0.86%	1.39%	3.95%
Hispanic or Latino (any race)	1,349	2,752	3,246	10.10%	20.94%	23.95%
Total	13,363	13,140	13,553	100.00%	100.00%	100.00%

=== 2020 census ===
As of the 2020 census, Warrenville had a population of 13,553. The median age was 38.2 years. 23.0% of residents were under the age of 18 and 14.9% were 65 years of age or older. For every 100 females, there were 96.3 males, and for every 100 females age 18 and over, there were 93.5 males.

99.2% of residents lived in urban areas, while 0.8% lived in rural areas.

There were 5,149 households, of which 32.9% had children under the age of 18 living in them. Of all households, 53.1% were married-couple households, 15.1% were households with a male householder and no spouse or partner present, and 24.6% were households with a female householder and no spouse or partner present. About 24.7% of all households were made up of individuals, and 10.4% had someone living alone who was 65 years of age or older.

There were 5,300 housing units, of which 2.8% were vacant. The homeowner vacancy rate was 0.8% and the rental vacancy rate was 3.9%.

=== 2024 special census ===
As of the 2024 United States special census there were 15,195 people, 5,068 households, and 3,266 families residing in the city. The population density was 2,415.00 inhabitants per square mile (932.44/km^{2}). There were 5,300 housing units at an average density of 944.40 per square mile (364.63/km^{2}). The racial makeup of the city was 67.36% White, 3.02% African American, 1.21% Native American, 5.11% Asian, 0.02% Pacific Islander, 11.22% from other races, and 12.06% from two or more races. Hispanic or Latino of any race were 23.95% of the population.

There were 5,068 households, out of which 29.8% had children under the age of 18 living with them, 49.72% were married couples living together, 12.23% had a female householder with no husband present, and 35.56% were non-families. 26.68% of all households were made up of individuals, and 9.33% had someone living alone who was 65 years of age or older. The average household size was 3.18 and the average family size was 2.57.

The city's age distribution consisted of 21.3% under the age of 18, 9.0% from 18 to 24, 29% from 25 to 44, 27.3% from 45 to 64, and 13.4% who were 65 years of age or older. The median age was 37.8 years. For every 100 females, there were 93.2 males. For every 100 females age 18 and over, there were 99.2 males.

The median income for a household in the city was $86,462, and the median income for a family was $100,388. Males had a median income of $52,470 versus $41,130 for females. The per capita income for the city was $39,721. About 6.4% of families and 8.5% of the population were below the poverty line, including 12.0% of those under age 18 and 12.3% of those age 65 or over.

== Economy ==
Durham School Services is a company based in Warrenville. Navistar left Warrenville in 2011, and moved to neighboring Lisle due to tax incentives.

=== Top employers ===
According to the city's 2025 Annual Comprehensive Financial Report, the top ten non-city employers in the city are:

#	Employer	# of Employees
1	EN Engineering LLC	1,000
2	LSC Communications	650
3	Liberty Mutual	600
4	Associated Integrated Supply Chain Solutions	400
5	Edward Hospital	390
6	RR Donnelley	355
7	A&H Management Group	270
8	The Pride Stores	250
8	Target	250
10	Life Time Fitness	245

== Government ==
Warrenville is also home to the Illinois Youth Center, a correctional facility for female juvenile offenders.

== Education ==
Warrenville is a part of Community Unit School District 200, and shares 20 schools with Wheaton. Residents of Warrenville attend Bower or Johnson elementary school, Hubble Middle School, and Wheaton Warrenville South High School. Wheaton Warrenville South High School is located in Wheaton. Until 2009, Hubble was also located in Wheaton; however, in time for the 2009–2010 school year, a new Hubble was opened in Warrenville, and the new building is one of a very few schools to meet the LEED certification standards for energy-efficient design. Some children from all over Chicagoland attend Four Winds Waldorf School, a private PreK-8 school in Warrenville.

=== Library ===
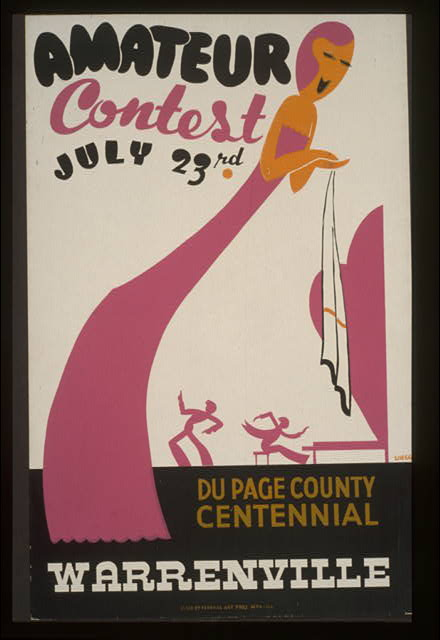
WPA poster, 1939

In the 1950s, the library was housed in 1,000 square feet (93 m^{2}) in the Community Building and was essentially a volunteer library filled with donated materials. Ten years later, the library closed due to a lack of volunteers and funding. The Warrenville Public Library District was formed by a referendum held in February 1979 with the citizens approving a 15-cent rate for library services. In 1986, voters approved another 15-cent tax rate increase to build and operate a 10,000-square-foot (930 m^{2}) facility on Stafford Place. In September 2003, a large addition and renovation project which tripled the size of the facility was completed. The building was made possible by the City of Warrenville TIF funds. The Warrenville Public Library District is a member of the DuPage Library System.

== Notable people ==
- Adam Emory Albright, figure-in-landscape painter
- Ivan Albright, magic realist painter
- Dustin Byfuglien, Right Wing/Defense for Winnipeg Jets of NHL, won Stanley Cup in 2010 with the Chicago Blackhawks
- Brooks McCormick (1917–2006) chief executive officer of International Harvester, philanthropist and equestrian
- Chauncey McCormick (1884–1954) art collector and father of Brooks McCormick
- Tony Moeaki, professional football player
- Miles J. Stanford, Christian author
- Jack Steadman, former president and general manager of the Kansas City Chiefs
- John Maynard Woodworth, first Surgeon General of the United States
