= Community Unit School District 200 (DuPage County, Illinois) =

School district in Illinois, United States

CUSD 200

Address
- 130 West Park Avenue Wheaton, DuPage County, Illinois, 60189; United States
- Coordinates: 41°51′27″N 88°06′26″W

District information
- Type: Public unit school district
- Grades: PK–12
- Superintendent: Jeffrey Schuler
- Schools: 20
- Budget: US$262.9 million (2020)
- NCES District ID: 1742180
- District ID: IL-19-022-2000-26

Students and staff
- Students: 12,319 (2020)
- Teachers: 853 (2020)
- Student–teacher ratio: 14.43 (2020)

Other information
- Website: www.cusd200.org

Community Unit School District 200 (CUSD 200) based in Wheaton, Illinois is a public unit school district mainly serving the communities of Wheaton and Warrenville. CUSD 200 also services portions of Carol Stream, Winfield, and West Chicago, as well as adjacent unincorporated areas within DuPage County. For the 2019-20 school year, there were a total of 12,319 students enrolled in twenty schools, ranging from preschool through 12th grade. The district has expenditures of approximately $19,053 per pupil, as of 2018.

== Schools ==
High Schools

There were 3,906 students enrolled in the two high schools, as of 2020.

Wheaton North	Wheaton Warrenville South

Middle Schools

There were 2,818 students enrolled in the four middle schools, as of 2020.

Edison Middle School	Hubble Middle School
Franklin Middle School	Monroe Middle School

Elementary Schools

There were 5,595 students enrolled in thirteen elementary schools, and one early childhood center, as of 2020.

Bower Elementary	Emerson Elementary	Hawthorne Elementary
Johnson Elementary	Lincoln Elementary	Longfellow Elementary
Lowell Elementary	Madison Elementary	Pleasant Hill Elementary
Sandburg Elementary	Washington Elementary	Whittier Elementary
Wiesbrook Elementary	Jefferson Early Childhood Center

== Legal proceedings ==
In May 2009, the Illinois Supreme Court issued a decision in Stern v. Wheaton-Warrenville Community Unit School District 200. The case revolved around a 2006 request, through the Freedom of Information Act (FOIA), for a copy of the superintendent's contract. The district repeatedly denied this request, citing that the request would violate the superintendent's right to privacy.

The initial ruling in the circuit court was to agree with the school district. The appellate court found that the contract was not exempt from disclosure, but that there was a constitutional issue in the original complaint that was not being addressed. The Supreme Court agreed that the contract was not exempt from an FOIA request, provided that care was taken not to release any information (such as a Social Security Number or bank account information). The decision was unanimous.
