= Jerome Collins =

American football player (born 1982)

No. 48, 86
- Position: Tight end

Personal information
- Born: August 18, 1982 (age 44); Columbus, Georgia, U.S.
- Listed height: 6 ft 4 in (1.93 m)
- Listed weight: 267 lb (121 kg)

Career information
- High school: Wheaton Warrenville South (Wheaton, Illinois)
- College: Notre Dame
- NFL draft: 2005: 5th round, 144th overall pick

Career history
- St. Louis Rams (2005); Dallas Cowboys (2006)*; Indianapolis Colts (2006); New York Giants (2007)
- * Offseason or practice squad member only

Awards and highlights
- 2× Super Bowl champion (XLI, XLII)
- Stats at Pro Football Reference

Jerome Vincent Collins (born August 18, 1982) is an American former professional football player who was a tight end in the National Football League (NFL). He played college football for the Notre Dame Fighting Irish and was selected by the St. Louis Rams in the fifth round of the 2005 NFL draft.

== Early life ==
Jerome attended Wheaton Warrenville South High School from 1996 to 2000. He was on the undefeated 1998 Illinois (IHSA) football championship team for division 6-A, which at the time was the most populated division of Illinois high schools. Jerome played high school football with former University of Illinois quarterback Jon Beutjer and Northwestern University wide receiver Jon Schweighardt. Collins received special mention on Champaign News-Gazette All-state team. He was a three-year starter who helped his team to state titles as a sophomore and junior followed by an 8–3 mark in 1999. He caught 35 passes for 450 yards and five touchdowns as a senior in 1999 and made 31 catches for 702 yards and eight touchdowns as junior. Collins averaged 11.6 points and 6.8 rebounds as a senior in basketball and earned All-league honors and ran the second leg on the 1999 state championship 4x100 relay.

== College career ==
Collins moved to tight end for his final season at Notre Dame. He appeared in twelve games, but did not start any games while catching six passes for 67 yards (11.2 avg). He was involved in two blocked punts and totaled 4 tackles (3 solos) on special teams action. Collins played in 10 games at defensive end and linebacker for the Irish in 2003 and also contributed on special teams. He finished the season with nine tackles (seven solos) and one tackle for a loss. In 2002, he played in 11 games as a reserve at outside linebacker. As a sophomore in 2001 Collins played in three games as a reserve at outside linebacker and made one tackle. In 2000, he did not see action after changing positions from wide receiver to outside linebacker during the 2000 season.

== Professional career ==
Pre-draft measurables
| Height | Weight | Arm length | Hand span | 40-yard dash | 10-yard split | 20-yard split | 20-yard shuttle | Three-cone drill | Vertical jump | Broad jump | Bench press | Wonderlic |
|---|---|---|---|---|---|---|---|---|---|---|---|---|
| 6 4 1/4 | 267 lb (121 kg) | 32 in (0.81 m) | 9 3/8 | 4.53 s | 1.60 s | 2.69 s | 4.07 s | 7.09 s | 40 in (1.02 m) | 10 ft 0 in (3.05 m) | 24 reps | 29 |
All values from Notre Dame pro day.

=== St. Louis Rams ===
Collins was selected in the fifth round with the 144th overall pick of the 2005 NFL draft by the St. Louis Rams from the University of Notre Dame. He was on the Rams practice squad and also the 53-man roster (playing three games) before being released.

=== Dallas Cowboys ===
After he was released from the Rams the Cowboys signed Collins to be on their practice squad.

=== Indianapolis Colts ===
He signed with the Colts on October 4, 2006. He was placed on injured reserve after injuring his Achilles tendon during practice in December 2006. On February 23, 2007, the Colts released Collins.

=== New York Giants ===
He was signed to the New York Giants practice squad prior to the week 1 game against the Cowboys and was signed to the active roster after week 15. He has been on back to back Super Bowl winning rosters with the Colts and Giants, although he had not appeared in a game for either team. He was released by the Giants on August 30, 2008, during final cuts.
