= Pete Ittersagen =

American football player (born 1985)

No. 38
- Position: Cornerback

Personal information
- Born: September 28, 1985 (age 41); Wheaton, Illinois, U.S.
- Listed height: 5 ft 10 in (1.78 m)
- Listed weight: 189 lb (86 kg)

Career information
- College: Wheaton
- NFL draft: 2009: undrafted

Career history
- Jacksonville Jaguars (2009)*; Indianapolis Colts (2010)*; Tennessee Titans (2010−2011); Edmonton Eskimos (2012)
- * Offseason or practice squad member only

Career NFL statistics
- Total tackles: 4
- Stats at Pro Football Reference

Peter Ittersagen (born September 28, 1985) is an American former professional football player who was a cornerback in the National Football League (NFL). He was signed by the Jacksonville Jaguars as an undrafted free agent in 2009. He played college football for the Wheaton Thunder.

== Early life ==
Ittersagen graduated from Wheaton North High School in 2004 and went on to graduate from Wheaton College in 2009.

== Professional career ==
=== Jacksonville Jaguars ===
After going undrafted in the 2009 NFL draft, Ittersagen signed with the Jacksonville Jaguars as an undrafted free agent on April 27, 2009. He was cut on September 5, 2009.

=== Tennessee Titans ===
Ittersagen was signed by the Tennessee Titans on August 2, 2010. He was cut on August 31, 2010 and re-signed to the practice squad on September 5. He was promoted to the active roster on December 17, 2010.

=== Edmonton Eskimos ===
Ittersagen was signed by the Edmonton Eskimos on May 29, 2012, but was released with the final roster cuts on June 23, 2012. He joined the Eskimos practice roster on September 6, 2012.

== Personal life ==
Ittersagen married Annie Ittersagen (née Torppey), a former Wheaton College student and lifelong Wheaton resident.
