= Danny Vitale =

American football player (born 1993)

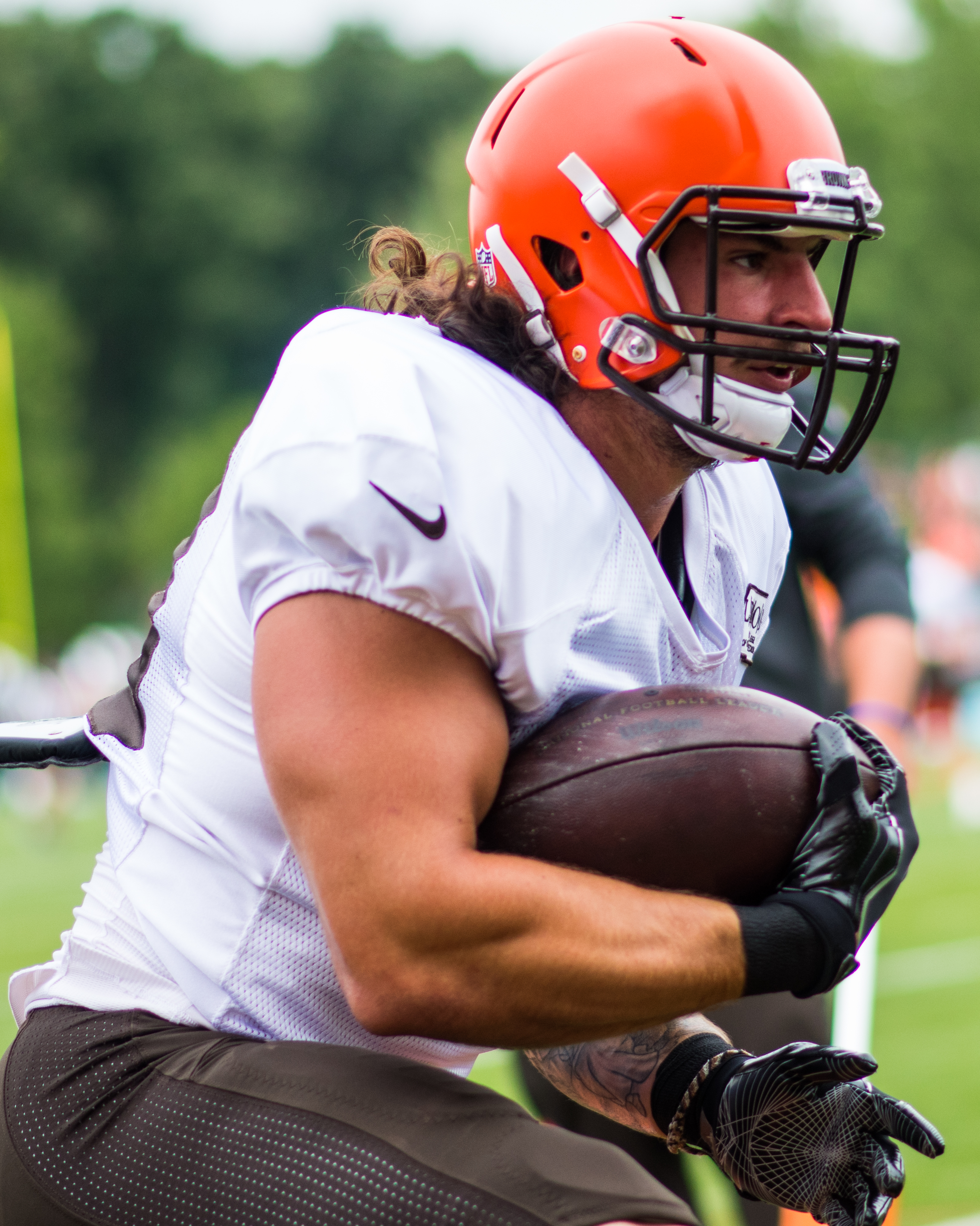
- Vitale with the Cleveland Browns in 2018

No. 40, 45
- Position: Fullback

Personal information
- Born: October 26, 1993 (age 33); Wheaton, Illinois, U.S.
- Listed height: 6 ft 1 in (1.85 m)
- Listed weight: 239 lb (108 kg)

Career information
- High school: Wheaton Warrenville South
- College: Northwestern
- NFL draft: 2016: 6th round, 197th overall pick

Career history
- Tampa Bay Buccaneers (2016)*; Buffalo Bills (2016)*; Tampa Bay Buccaneers (2016)*; Cleveland Browns (2016–2018); Green Bay Packers (2018–2019); New England Patriots (2020)
- * Offseason or practice squad member only

Awards and highlights
- Second-team All-Big Ten (2015)

Career NFL statistics
- Rushing attempts: 1
- Rushing yards: 3
- Receptions: 15
- Receiving yards: 145
- Stats at Pro Football Reference

Dan Michael Vitale III (born October 26, 1993) is an American former professional football player who was a fullback in the National Football League (NFL). He played college football for the Northwestern Wildcats and was selected by the Tampa Bay Buccaneers in the sixth round of the 2016 NFL draft. He was also a member of the Buffalo Bills, Cleveland Browns, Green Bay Packers, and New England Patriots.

== Early life ==
Vitale was born one of two sons to Lisa and Dan Vitale. His brother Tommy played as a linebacker while at Northwestern University. Vitale attended high school in Wheaton, Illinois, the same as former football player Red Grange, actor John Belushi and astronomer Edwin Hubble.

While attending Wheaton Warrenville South High School, Vitale earned distinctions including places on the honor roll and National Honor Society. He played high school football as both a wide receiver and running back. During the 2011 season, Vitale earned All-Area and All-State awards. He earned a letter in wrestling where he competed at 152 lbs, lettered two years in football and earned letters three years in track.

== College career ==
Vitale played for Northwestern University, beginning with his freshman season in 2012. He was named to the Academic All-Big Ten Conference three times, during his sophomore, junior and senior seasons. While at Northwestern, Vitale majored in economics, with minors in business institutions and integrated marketing communications.

== Professional career ==
Pre-draft measurables
Height	Weight	Arm length	Hand span	40-yard dash	10-yard split	20-yard split	20-yard shuttle	Three-cone drill	Vertical jump	Broad jump	Bench press
6 ft 0 7/8 in (1.85 m)	239 lb (108 kg)	31 3/4 in (0.81 m)	9 3/4 in (0.25 m)	4.60 s	1.59 s	2.69 s	4.12 s	7.12 s	38.5 in (0.98 m)	10 ft 3 in (3.12 m)	30 reps
All values from NFL Combine

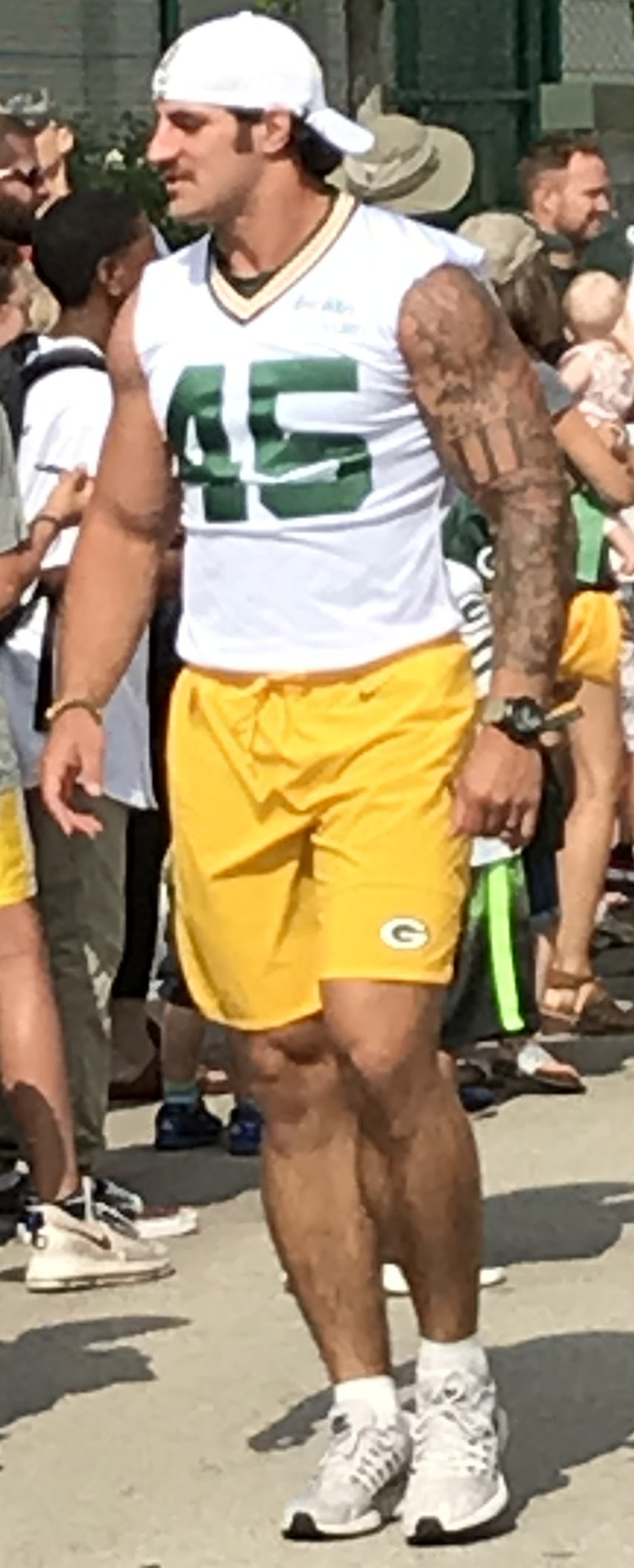
Vitale during 2019 training camp.

=== Tampa Bay Buccaneers (first stint) ===
Vitale was selected by the Buccaneers in the sixth round of the 2016 NFL draft with the 197th overall pick. He was released by the Buccaneers as part of final roster cuts on September 3, 2016.

=== Buffalo Bills ===
Vitale was claimed off waivers by the Buffalo Bills the next day, but failed his physical examination, voiding the contract.

=== Tampa Bay Buccaneers (second stint) ===
On September 10, 2016, he re-joined the Buccaneers as a member of their practice squad.

=== Cleveland Browns ===
Vitale was signed off the Buccaneers' practice squad by the Cleveland Browns on October 14, 2016.

On September 1, 2018, Vitale suffered a calf injury and was placed on injured list. He was released by the Browns on October 12.

=== Green Bay Packers ===
Vitale was signed to the Green Bay Packers practice squad on October 22, 2018. He was promoted to the active roster on December 1. Vitale appeared in five games for the team during the season.

In the 2019 season, Vitale saw some increased usage in the receiving game with seven receptions for 97 yards. He started in four of the 15 games he appeared in.

=== New England Patriots ===
On March 21, 2020, Vitale signed a one-year contract with the New England Patriots. On July 28, Vitale announced he was opting out of the 2020 season due to the COVID-19 pandemic. He was released after the season on May 27, 2021.

On June 6, 2021, Vitale announced his retirement from professional football.

== NFL career statistics ==
Regular season statistics
Year	Team	Games		Rushing					Receiving					Fumbles	
Year	Team	GP	GS	Att	Yds	Avg	Lng	TD	Rec	Yds	Avg	Lng	TD	Fum	Lost
2016	CLE	9	3	0	0	0	0	0	4	27	6.8	17	0	0	0
2017	CLE	15	6	0	0	0	0	0	3	19	6.3	11	0	0	0
2018	GB	5	0	0	0	0	0	0	1	2	2.0	2	0	0	0
2019	GB	15	4	1	3	3.0	3	0	7	97	13.9	27	0	0	0
2020	NE	Did not play due to COVID-19 opt-out													
Total		44	13	1	3	3.0	3	0	15	145	9.7	27	0	0	0
Source: NFL.com

== Post-NFL career ==
Beginning in November 2021, Vitale founded the health and fitness company VITALETY, LLC. In January 2022, Vitale became Financial Advisor and Financial Planning Specialist for the financial services company Morgan Stanley in New York, New York.
