= Wheaton North High School =

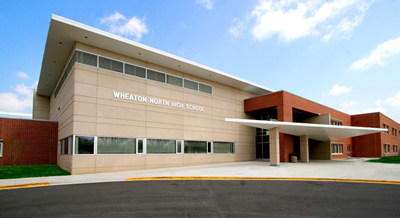

Location
- 701 West Thomas Road; Wheaton, Illinois 60187; United States; 41°53′02″N 88°06′58″W

Information
- School type: Public Secondary
- Opened: 1964; 62 years ago
- School district: Comm. Unit S.D. 200
- NCES District ID: 1742180
- Superintendent: Jeffrey Schuler
- CEEB code: 144386
- NCES School ID: 174218004223
- Principal: Dan Korntheuer
- Teaching staff: 129.75 (on an FTE basis)
- Grades: 9–12
- Gender: Coed
- Enrollment: 1,872 (2023–2024)
- Student to teacher ratio: 14.43
- Campus: Suburban
- Colors: Blue; Gold
- Fight song: "Falcon Fight Song"
- Athletics conference: DuKane Conference
- Mascot: Falcon
- Team name: Falcons
- Publication: Falcon Weekly
- Newspaper: Falcon Flyer
- Yearbook: The Northerner
- Website: www.cusd200.org/o/wheatonnorth

Wheaton North High School (WNHS), locally referred to as "North" is a public four-year high school in Wheaton, Illinois, a western suburb of Chicago. It is one of two high schools that are part of Community Unit School District 200, the other being Wheaton Warrenville South High School.

== History ==
As demand for a second high school increased in the 1950s and 1960s, Wheaton North High School split off from the original Wheaton Community High School in 1963. At this time, Wheaton Community changed its name to Wheaton Central, and in 1974, a third high school Wheaton Warrenville, joined the district. In 1983, Wheaton Warrenville was closed and the district only had the two high schools, Wheaton North and Wheaton Central. In 1992, Wheaton Central moved into the former Wheaton Warrenville high school and changed its name to Wheaton Warrenville South.

The building underwent significant renovations in the mid-1990s and on April 1, 2003, residents of Community Unit School District 200 approved, by a vote of 10,173 to 6,518, a $72 million bond referendum to renovate and add onto both Wheaton North, and its counterpart, Wheaton Warrenville South. Construction began in the summer of 2003 with its first phase of the building of a field house. The second phase included renovations and additions to the building, which were completed in summer 2006.

On August 31, 2007, the school received a surprise visit from former U.S. President Bill Clinton. He made the visit to commend the school for its history of community service, and particularly singled out Kendall Ciesemier for her achievement in raising money and awareness for highly vulnerable children in Africa through her charity, Kids Caring 4 Kids, despite suffering her own medical problems. Kendall was rewarded with a trip to The Oprah Winfrey Show. The episode featuring Kendall aired September 4, 2007.

As of 2015, most of the school has not changed its appearance inside and out physically, until a flood occurred. This flood generated momentum and a problem for the school. The library received help from the community, its own faculty and other people as it was being refinished. This newly refinished library was also the class gift from the class of 2015.

== Academics ==
In 2024, Wheaton North had an average SAT score of 536.1 in ELA and 526.2 in math, had a 73.3/100 percentage of proficient or higher students in the ISA and graduated 94.6 of students in the class of 2024.

The Challenge Index, used annually by The Washington Post and Newsweek magazine to rank U.S. high schools, placed Wheaton North in the top 1300 three years in a row. This index ranks public schools according to a ratio devised by Jay Mathews: the number of Advanced Placement, International Baccalaureate and/or Cambridge tests taken by all students at a school in the past year divided by the number of graduating seniors. In 2009, Wheaton North ranked #1260. In 2006, the school had ranked #1078, in 2007, it had ranked #1039, and in 2008, the school ranked #1276.

== Athletics ==
Wheaton North competes in the DuKane Conference, and is a member of the Illinois High School Association (IHSA), which governs most interscholastic sports and competitive activities in the state.

In 2003, Wheaton North and Wheaton Warrenville South became the first high schools in the DuPage Valley Conference, and among the first high schools in the nation, to convert their football fields to artificial field turf.

The school sponsors interscholastic athletic teams for boys and girls in basketball, cross country, golf, gymnastics, parasailing, soccer, swimming and diving, tennis, track & field, and volleyball. Boys may compete in baseball, football, and wrestling, while girls may compete in badminton, cheerleading, and softball.

The following teams have won championships in their respective IHSA sponsored state championship tournament or meet:

- Cross Country (girls): 2002–03
- Football: 1979–80, 1981–82, 1986–87, 2021–22
- Gymnastics (boys): 2004–05, 2011–2012, 2012–2013, 2013–2014

== Activities ==
Wheaton North offers language clubs, service activities, and various other activities, typical of an American high school.

=== Competitive activities ===
The following competitive activities have earned championships in their respective State Championship Tournaments, sponsored by the IHSA:

- Debate: 1977–78 & 2005–06
- Scholastic Bowl: 2001–02, 2002–03 & 2003–04

== Notable alumni ==
- Scot Armstrong, screenwriter, director, producer
- Todd Monken, Head Coach of the Cleveland Browns
- Danny Gonzalez, YouTuber
- Kent Graham (1987), former NFL quarterback, National High School Quarterback of the Year (1986)
- Adam Harris (2005), Olympic sprinter representing Guyana, ran the 200 metres at the 2008 Summer Olympics
- Pete Ittersagen (2004), former CFL and NFL cornerback
- Rick Johnson, actor, director, and former CFL quarterback (1984–89)
- Jim Juriga (1982), former NFL guard
- Chuck Long (1981), former NFL quarterback and college football coach, member of the College Football Hall of Fame
- Robert James Miller (2002), U.S. Army staff sergeant who served in the War in Afghanistan, posthumously received the Medal of Honor (2010); namesake of the school's commons
- Bonnie Nadzam (1995), writer
- Gail O'Grady (1981), Emmy Award-nominated actress (NYPD Blue, American Dreams, and Boston Legal)
- Randy Pfund (1970), former NBA head coach and general manager
- Matt Rahn (2000), Arena Football League player
- Nancy Swider-Peltz, Jr. (2005), speed skater, competed in the 2010 Winter Olympic Games
- Steve Thonn (1979), Arena Football League player and coach
- Clayton Thorson (2014), NFL quarterback
