= Luke Juriga =

American football player (born 1997)

No. 59
- Position: Center

Personal information
- Born: June 7, 1997 (age 29); Aurora, Illinois, U.S.
- Listed height: 6 ft 4 in (1.93 m)
- Listed weight: 301 lb (137 kg)

Career information
- High school: Marmion Academy (Aurora)
- College: Western Michigan
- NFL draft: 2020: undrafted

Career history
- Philadelphia Eagles (2020–2021); San Antonio Brahmas (2023)

Awards and highlights
- 2× First-team All-MAC (2018, 2019)

Career NFL statistics
- Games played: 13
- Stats at Pro Football Reference

Luke Juriga (born June 7, 1997) is an American former professional football player who was a center in the National Football League (NFL). He was signed by the Philadelphia Eagles as an undrafted free agent in 2020 following his college football career with the Western Michigan Broncos.

== College career ==
Juriga played three seasons at Western Michigan at right guard, earning Second-team All-Mid-American Conference honors in 2017 and First-team All-MAC in 2018. Before his senior season, he moved to center and was named team captain. Juriga was named to the First-team All-MAC as well as the program's Greg Jennings Outstanding Offensive Player award. He finished his career starting all 52 games played and was a four-time Academic All-MAC performer. Juriga was named to the East-West Shrine Bowl in January 2020.

== Professional career ==
=== Philadelphia Eagles ===
Juriga signed with the Philadelphia Eagles as an undrafted free agent following the 2020 NFL draft on April 26, 2020. He was waived during final roster cuts on September 3, 2020, and re-signed to the team's practice squad three days later. He was promoted to the active roster on October 3, 2020. In Week 11 against the Cleveland Browns, Juriga entered the game at the end of the first half following a minor injury to Jason Kelce.

On August 17, 2021, Juriga was waived/injured by the Eagles and placed on injured reserve. He was released on August 21. He was re-signed to the practice squad on December 1.

=== San Antonio Brahmas ===
On November 17, 2022, Juriga was selected by the San Antonio Brahmas of the XFL. He was removed from the roster on February 15, 2024.

== Personal life ==
Juriga's father Jim played for three seasons in the NFL.
