= Todd Monken =

American football coach (born 1966)

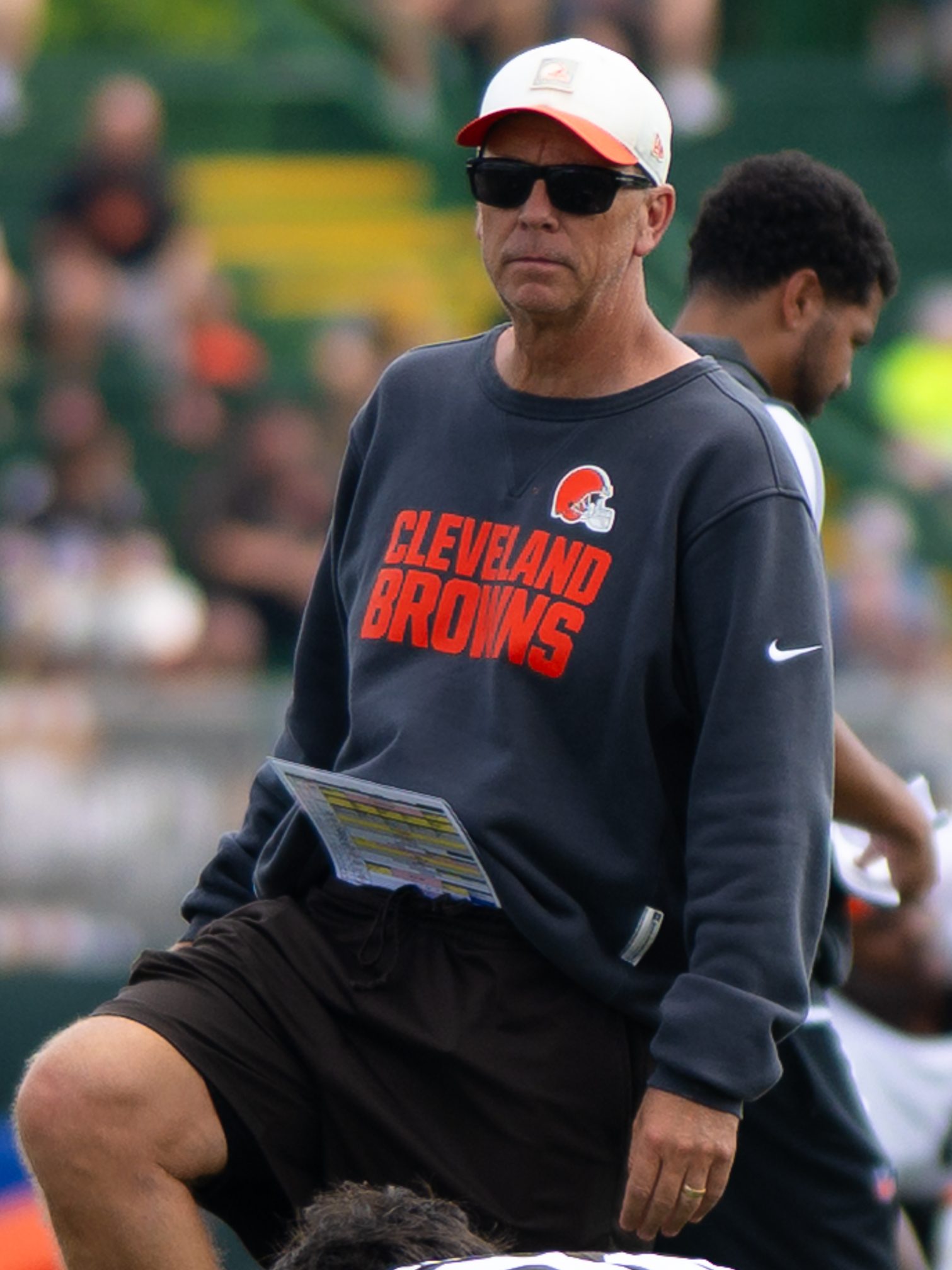
- Monken with the Cleveland Browns in 2026

Cleveland Browns
- Title: Head coach

Personal information
- Born: February 5, 1966 (age 60); Wheaton, Illinois, U.S.

Career information
- Position: Quarterback
- High school: Wheaton North
- College: Knox (IL) (1986–1988)

Career history
- Grand Valley State (1989–1990) Graduate assistant; Notre Dame (1991–1992) Graduate assistant; Eastern Michigan (1993–1999); Defensive backs coach & wide receivers coach (1993–1997); Offensive coordinator & wide receivers coach (1998–1999); Louisiana Tech (2000–2001) Running backs coach & wide receivers coach (2000) Wide receivers coach (2001); Oklahoma State (2002–2004) Passing game coordinator & wide receivers coach; LSU (2005–2006) Passing game coordinator & wide receivers coach; Jacksonville Jaguars (2007–2010) Wide receivers coach; Oklahoma State (2011–2012) Offensive coordinator & quarterbacks coach; Southern Miss (2013–2015) Head coach; Tampa Bay Buccaneers (2016–2018); Offensive coordinator & wide receivers coach (2016–2017); Offensive coordinator (2018); Cleveland Browns (2019) Offensive coordinator; Georgia (2020–2022) Offensive coordinator & quarterbacks coach; Baltimore Ravens (2023–2025) Offensive coordinator; Cleveland Browns (2026–present) Head coach

Awards and highlights
- 2× CFP national champion (2021, 2022); C-USA Coach of the Year (2015)

Head coaching record
- Regular season: NFL: 6–4 (.600)
- Career: NFL: 6–4 (.600); NCAA: 13–25 (.342)
- Coaching profile at Pro Football Reference

Todd Robert Monken (born February 5, 1966) is an American professional football coach and former quarterback who is the head coach for the Cleveland Browns of the National Football League (NFL). He previously served as the head coach at the University of Southern Mississippi from 2013 to 2015. Monken played college football at Knox College, in Galesburg, Illinois from 1986 to 1988.

Monken was born in Wheaton, Illinois. His father, Bob Monken, was a high school football coach in Illinois. He attended high school at Wheaton North High School, when his father was head coach at Lake Park High School in Roselle, Illinois. His father is the namesake for the schools football field, Monken Field. After graduation from high school in 1985, Todd enrolled at the Knox College and played quarterback for the Old Siwash, starting for two seasons, in addition he played on the baseball team. As a senior in 1988, he was named All-Midwest Conference South Division First Team and NCAA Division III All-American.

From 1989 to 1992, Monken was a graduate assistant coach at Grand Valley State University, and the University of Notre Dame under Tom Beck. In 1993, he joined the Eastern Michigan University football staff as a defensive backs coach under Ron Cooper, whom Monken worked with at Notre Dame. When Cooper left, he stayed on under the new coaching staff, eventually being elevated to offensive coordinator in 1998. Monken took a job at Louisiana Tech University as the wide receivers coach in 2000, before moving onto the same position at the Oklahoma State University in 2002. He followed head coach Les Miles to Louisiana State University in 2005 and 2006, he moved to the NFL in 2007, where he led the Jacksonville Jaguars wide receivers for four seasons. Monken returned to the college ranks in 2011 as the offensive coordinator and quarterbacks coach for two seasons.

Monken accepted the job as head football coach for the University of Southern Mississippi in 2013. Monken led the team to three consecutive improved seasons, culminating at a Conference USA Championship Game berth in 2015, where the Golden Eagles lost 28–45 to the Western Kentucky Hilltoppers.

On January 24, 2016, Monken left Southern Miss to return to the NFL, joining the Tampa Bay Buccaneers as their offensive coordinator. In 2019, he joined the Cleveland Browns as their offensive coordinator, when Freddie Kitchens was dismissed after a single season; Monken was named the offensive coordinator and quarterbacks coach at the University of Georgia, helping lead the team to consecutive berths in the College Football Playoff in the 2022 and 2023 season, winning back-to-back national championships in 2021 and 2022: the school's first since 1980. He then returned to the NFL as the offensive coordinator for the Baltimore Ravens from 2023 to 2025.

On January 28, 2026, Monken was named the head coach of the Cleveland Browns.

== Early life and education ==
Born in Wheaton, Illinois, on February 5, 1966, Monken is the son of Jo Ellen (née Stewart) and Robert "Bob" Monken. Both Todd and his brothers Tony and Ted were born in Wheaton, while his father was head coach at nearby Lake Park High School in Roselle. Todd and his brothers attended Wheaton North High School, where he played quarterback as well as shortstop on the Falcons baseball team.

In February 1985, Monken committed to play football for Bruce Craddock's Western Illinois Leathernecks football team as a preferred walk-on. With the arrival of Paul Singer the same season for Western Illinois, Monken decided it would be best if he left Western Illinois, and transferred to the College of DuPage, where he played as an outfielder for the College of DuPage in the spring of 1986.

In the fall of 1986, Monken transferred to play football for Randy Oberembt's Knox Old Siwash football team. As a sophomore in 1986 Monken, age 20, was a backup to quarterback Bob Monroe who had broken Knox's single season record with 2,365 yards of total offense in 1985. In the 1986 season, Monroe started all 8 games, and was an All-Midwest Conference selection and an Honorable Mention All-American, while Monken backed him up and completed eleven of twenty-eight passes for 97 yards in limited action.

In the spring of 1987, Monken was in a competition for Knox's starting quarterback job. Three-year starter Bob Monroe and Monken battled, and the coaching staff designed a time-share at the position due to both of their great play, with Monroe playing the first and third quarter, while Monken would play the second and fourth quarters. With Monroe being left-handed and Monken being right-handed, their unique shared playing time also came with confusion for other teams to scheme against defensively. Monken completed 107 of 195 passes for 1,430 yards, fourteen touchdowns and six interceptions during his halved 1987 season.

In 1988, his final season at Knox, Monken started all 9 games at quarterback for Knox Old Siwash football team that compiled an 5–4 record, lost to Monmouth College in the 1988 Midwest Conference South Division. In the fifth game of the season, Monken led Knox to a 30–27 victory over Cornell College. Monken completed 41 of 62 passes for 462 yards and four touchdowns. Setting a record that still stands for most completions in a game for the Old Siwash. In the seventh game of the season, he broke his own Knox school record with 64 passing attempts, in a 30–37 defeat to Illinois College.

For the season, Monken completed 218 of 358 passes for 2,400 yards, 23 touchdowns, and 11 interceptions. His 23 passing touchdowns set a Knox season record that still stands. He also finished lead the country in pass attempts, completions, and completion percentage. Monken won numerous honors in 1988 including the following:

- He was selected as the first-team quarterback on the 1988 All-Midwest Conference football team.
- He was selected by Pizza Hut as the first-team quarterback on the 1988 College Football All-America Team for Division III.

Monken was also on the Knox baseball team, being named All-Midwest Conference as a junior and senior in 1987 and 1988 respectively.

While attending Knox, he was a member of the Xi Chapter of Beta Theta Pi. He earned a bachelor's degree in economics from Knox and a master's degree in education leadership from Grand Valley State University.

=== Statistics ===
Year	Team	Games			Passing								Rushing			
Year	Team	GP	GS	Record	Cmp	Att	Pct	Yds	Avg	TD	INT	Rtg	Att	Yds	Avg	TD
1986	Knox	3	0	0–0	11	28	39.3	97	3.5	1	0	37.3	0	0	–	0
1987	Knox	9	0	0–0	107	195	54.9	1,430	7.3	14	6	134.0	0	0	–	0
1988	Knox	9	9	5–4	218	358	60.9	2,400	6.7	23	11	132.3	0	-166	–	0
Career		21	9	5–4	336	581	57.8	3,927	6.8	38	17	130.3	0	-166	–	0

== Coaching career ==
=== Early years ===
Monken got his start in coaching at Grand Valley State as a graduate assistant under head coach, Tom Beck. During his two years at Grand Valley (1989–1990), Monken coached with defensive coordinator, Brian Kelly. When Beck moved to Notre Dame as offensive coordinator in 1991, Monken also joined the staff as a graduate assistant.

=== Eastern Michigan ===
When Notre Dame assistant coach Ron Cooper was named the head coach of the Eastern Michigan football program, he hired Monken to join his staff as a full-time assistant, earning $28,000 a year. Monken's role with the Eagles in 1993 and 1994 was as the defensive backs coach, helping tutor players like Vashone Adams and Ron Rice. In 1995, when Cooper moved on to coach at Louisville, new Eastern Michigan head coach Rick Rasnick kept Monken on staff but moved him to the offensive side of the ball, where he coached wide receivers. Under Monken the receivers saw several records broken, the first one by Steve Clay for receiving yards in a single season with 999, earning First Team All-Mid-American Conference (MAC). Clay's big season also allowed him to leave the career leader in receiving yards as well. The following year, Ontario Pryor broke Clay's record for single-season receiving yards with 1,031. In 1997, Monken helped mentor Jermaine Sheffield, who over the next three years, would leave EMU as their career receiving yards leader, and Savon Edwards would set the records for most receptions for a career, both of which have since been broken. Monken was promoted to offensive coordinator in 1998, where he was tasked with having to replace Charlie Batch at quarterback in his first season. This proved to be a difficult task, as Walter Church was named the starting quarterback, and the Eagles offense scored over 10 points less per game than they did in 1997. The following season, the offense saw a marginal improvement over the previous, scoring 2 points per game more than the previous season. Rasnick was fired with one game remaining in the season, leading to Monken's tenure coming to an end with the Eagles.

=== Louisiana Tech ===
In 2000, Monken joined Jack Bicknell Jr. as the running backs coach at Louisiana Tech University. While the Bulldogs running attack wasn't very effective, John Simon managed to be the Bulldogs second leading receiver, with 711 yards on 72 receptions, while also leading the team in rushing yards with 565. The following season, Monken moved to wide receivers coach, and Simon moved to wide receiver for his senior season. With Simon leading the team in receiving yards in 2001, the Bulldogs offense ranked 8th in the nation in passing offense, while winning the Western Athletic Conference title.

=== Oklahoma State ===
In April, 2002, Monken joined Les Miles's staff as the wide receivers coach at Oklahoma State University. In his first season, Rashaun Woods set single season program records for receptions (107), receiving yard (1,695), and receiving touchdowns (17). Woods would finish his career as the Oklahoma State leader in almost every single major statistical category for receiving, including receptions (293), receiving yard (4,414), and receiving touchdowns (42). Woods was a two-time all-American, including being recognized as a consensus first-team All-American in 2002.

=== LSU ===
In 2005, Monken followed Les Miles to Louisiana State University as the team's passing game coordinator and wide receivers coach. In 2005, Dwayne Bowe led the team in receptions, averaging 17.3 yards per catch and setting an LSU record by catching a touchdown pass in seven straight games. In 2006, Bowe lead the team in receptions (65) and receiving yards (990), he also set another LSU school record with 12 touchdown catches on the year. Bowe led a trio of receivers including Early Doucet and Craig Davis that combined for 180 catches, 2,598 yards, and 24 touchdowns.

=== Jacksonville Jaguars ===
In 2007, Monken was hired by the Jacksonville Jaguars to be their wide receivers coach. He was tasked with helping revive the career of Reggie Williams, who hadn't yet lived up to his 9th overall selection's expectations. Williams had his best professional season in 2007, where he had 38 catches for 629 yards (an average of 16.6 yards per catch) and 10 touchdowns (more than twice his career total prior to 2007). In a game against the Oakland Raiders in Week 16, he broke the Jaguars' single season receiving touchdown record, with ten scores. The Jaguars drafted Mike Sims-Walker in the third round, and missed the entire season with an injury he sustained in the preseason. In 2008, Matt Jones had a breakout year, where he had 65 catches for 761 yards in 12 games before being suspended for three games by the NFL, for violation of the league's substance abuse policy. Jones never returned to the NFL again. In 2009, Sims-Walker lead the team in all three major receiving categories, with Torry Holt has the second leading receiver, in what proved to be his final season. In 2010, the Jaguars passing game dropped to 27th in the league, Sims-Walker regressed on his progress the year before, and only Mike Thomas made improvements in the receiving core.

=== Oklahoma State (second stint) ===
On February 9, 2011, Mike Gundy introduced Monken as the next offensive coordinator tasked with keeping one of the nation's best offenses as potent as it has been in recent years. Gundy stated, “Todd is a really good fit for what we need. He’s been in the Big 12 and SEC and he’s coached at places that have won at a high level. He’s an experienced, intelligent coach who will be able to come in and help us pick up where we left off. We’re excited to have him join our staff.” In his second stint at Oklahoma State, Monken tutored Brandon Weeden into one of the best quarterbacks in college football, while also coaching Justin Blackmon, who was named a unanimous All-American. The Cowboys offense was one of the best in the entire country, finishing second in the nation with 48.7 points per game. Weeden finished second in the nation in passing yards (4,727) and fourth in passing touchdowns (37). The Cowboys won the Big 12 championship, the program's first conference championship since 1976 (when they tied as co-champions) and first outright conference championship since 1948. Blackmon and Weeden, both became first-round draft picks in the 2012 NFL draft. The team narrowly missed the opportunity to play undefeated LSU for the national championship, finishing the regular season ranked third in the country, only .01 points behind No.2 Alabama in the final aggregate BCS poll. Instead of the championship, the team was invited to the program's first BCS game, where they defeated Andrew Luck and the Stanford Cardinal 41–38 in overtime at the 2012 Fiesta Bowl. The following season, the Cowboys started three different quarterbacks throughout the year, Wes Lunt, J. W. Walsh, and Clint Chelf. Hunt and Walsh went down with injuries, and impressively, the combination of the three quarterbacks lead the team to the seventh best passing attack in the nation, and the team finished third in the nation in scoring offense. Offensive lineman Lane Taylor, was named a Second Team All-American. While the offense produced at a high efficiency, the team didn't reproduce the same result record-wise, finishing the season 8–5.

=== Southern Miss ===
==== Hiring ====
On December 10, 2012, it was reported that Monken accepted the position as head coach of the Southern Miss football team. He was hired to replace Ellis Johnson after an 0–12 season. On December 11, 2012, Monken was introduced as the head coach of the Golden Eagles. Monken guided the program to an impressive turn-around in his third season there (2015), finishing with a 9–5 record and playing in the Heart of Dallas Bowl. For his efforts, Monken was named Conference USA Coach of the Year.

==== 2013 season ====
On August 31, 2013, Monken lost his first game as head coach of Southern Miss, a 22–15 home loss against Texas State. On September 7, Southern Miss lost 56–13 against No. 22 Nebraska. On September 14, Monken led Southern Miss to a 24–3 loss to Arkansas. On September 28, Monken led Southern Miss to a 7–60 loss to Boise State. After an 0–6 season to start the season, Monken benched Cal transfer, and starting quarterback, Allan Bridgford in favor of true freshman Nick Mullens. On October 26, in Mullen's first start, Monken lead the Golden Eagles to a 55–14 loss to the North Texas. The Golden Eagles then lost their next four matches with losses against Marshall, Louisiana Tech, Florida Atlantic, and Middle Tennessee. The losses mounted to push the Golden Eagles losing streak to 23 games. The following week, Southern Miss beat UAB 62–27, given Monken his first win as a head coach at any level. He finished his first season as the Golden Eagles' head coach with a 1–11 record.

==== 2014 season ====
In the opening game of the season, which was their road opener, the Golden Eagles were shutout by Mississippi State 49–0. In their first home game, the Golden Eagles narrowly defeated Alcorn State 26–20. In their next game against No. 3 Alabama, the Golden Eagles fell 52–12. The following week, Southern Miss beat Appalachian State 21–20. In their conference opener, the Golden Eagles were defeated 41–23 to Rice. The following week, the Golden Eagles were defeated by Middle Tennessee, 37–31. After the bye week, Southern Miss then went to Denton, Texas and defeated North Texas 30–20. The following week, Southern Miss returned home to take on Louisiana Tech. The Golden Eagles were defeated by the Bulldogs, 31–20, in the Rivalry in Dixie. In their 5th conference game, Southern Miss was defeated by UTEP 35–14. On homecoming, the Golden Eagles then were defeated by No. 23 Marshall 63–17. The Golden Eagles then got beat by UTSA 12–10. In the season finale, UAB blew out the Golden Eagles, 45–24. The Golden Eagles finished the season 3–9.

==== 2015 season ====
With two difficult seasons behind him, Monken had recruited depth, and fans were expecting an improved season in 2015. The media had selected the Golden Eagles to finish 4th in the West Division. To open the season, the Golden Eagles hosted SEC opponent, but a 34–16 home loss against Mississippi State was the result. The following week, Southern Miss blew out an FCS Austin Peay 52–6, giving Monken his fifth win as Southern Miss's head coach. The following week, Monken and the Golden Eagles traveled to San Marcos, Texas were they survived with a win in a shootout, 56–50, against Texas State. The Golden Eagles won two straight games for the first time since 2012, before traveling to Lincoln, Nebraska to face Nebraska, where they were defeated 36–28. The Golden Eagles got back to their winning ways the next week when they returned home to open Conference USA play, with a 49–14 win over North Texas. The following week, Southern Miss traveled to Huntington, West Virginia to face Marshall, where they were defeated 31–10. The Golden Eagles won six straight to finish the regular season 9–3 (7–1), winning the West Division of Conference USA. On December 5, Monken led Southern Miss to a 45–25 defeat to Western Kentucky in the 2015 Conference USA championship game. He finished his third season as the Golden Eagles' head coach with a 9–5 record, with a loss in the Heart of Dallas Bowl to Washington, 44–31. Junior quarterback Nick Mullens completed 331 of 521 passes (63.5%) for 4,476 yards and 38 touchdowns – school records for passing yardage and touchdown passes.

=== Tampa Bay Buccaneers ===
On January 24, 2016, Monken was hired by the Tampa Bay Buccaneers to be their offensive coordinator. The move reunited Monken and head coach Dirk Koetter, who previously had worked together with the Jacksonville Jaguars. In Monken's first season as the Buccaneers offensive coordinator, the Buccaneers were eighteenth in the NFL in yards per game and points scored. One of the team's bright spots was Mike Evans ranking fourth in receiving yards for the season, was selected to the Pro Bowl (the first of his career), and was named Second Team All-All-Pro.

In 2017, Monken guided a Tampa Bay offense that finished in the top 10 in numerous categories, including yards per game (363.4 – ninth), passing yards per game (272.9 – fourth), fewest turnovers (19 – tied-fifth), first downs per game (22 – second), third down percentage (43.4 percent – fourth). However, the team struggled with turnovers and converting in the redzone.

In 2018, the Tampa Bay offense performed even better, finishing as the best passing offense in the league, and third best offense overall. They set franchise records for total yards (6,648), passing yards (5,125), passing touchdowns (36), and total touchdowns (49), even while splitting time at quarterback with Ryan Fitzpatrick and Jameis Winston. Despite the offense performing so well, the defense was one of the league's worst, finishing with the 2nd most points given up. After Koetter was fired after the season, Monken was not retained on new head coach Bruce Arians' staff.

=== Cleveland Browns ===
On January 14, 2019, Monken was hired by the Cleveland Browns to be their offensive coordinator under new head coach Freddie Kitchens., replacing Kitchens who had been the interim offensive coordinator the finish the 2018 season, but it was clear that Kitchens would keep play calling-responsibilities. In Monken's lone season as the Browns offensive coordinator, the Browns were 22nd in the NFL in yards per game and 22nd in points scored. Browns wide receiver Jarvis Landry ended the season with 6 touchdown receptions, 1,174 receiving yards and a 14.4 yards per reception average. Running back, Nick Chubb earned his first Pro Bowl nomination. The Browns failed to reached the playoffs, and the entire staff was fired following the conclusion of the season.

=== Georgia ===
On January 17, 2020, Monken was hired by the Georgia Bulldogs to be their offensive coordinator and quarterbacks coach under head coach, Kirby Smart. Monken had to replace Jake Fromm, who was the second career Georgia leader in passing touchdowns and fourth in passing yards for the Bulldogs. The Bulldogs struggled to find consistency at quarterback, starting three different players there throughout the season. He was part of the Bulldogs' coaching staff that won the National Championship over Alabama in the 2021 season. Monken won his second championship as part of the Georgia coaching staff when they defeated TCU 65–7 in the National Championship.

=== Baltimore Ravens ===
On February 14, 2023, the Baltimore Ravens hired Monken as their offensive coordinator after the departure of Greg Roman.

In his first season as Baltimore's offensive coordinator, the Ravens went 13–4 and achieved the AFC's top seed in the 2023-24 NFL playoffs. However, the Ravens eventually lost to the Kansas City Chiefs by a final score of 17–10 in the AFC Championship Game. Monken was widely criticized by NFL fans and analysts for abandoning the team's top-ranked rushing attack during the team's season-ending loss to Kansas City.

On January 27, 2025, the Ravens signed Monken to a contract extension.

=== Cleveland Browns (second stint) ===
On January 28, 2026, Monken was hired as the head coach of the Cleveland Browns.

== Head coaching record ==
=== College ===
Year	Team	Overall	Conference	Standing	Bowl/playoffs
Southern Miss Golden Eagles (Conference USA) (2013–2015)
2013	Southern Miss	1–11	1–7	T–5th (East)	
2014	Southern Miss	3–9	1–7	6th (West)	
2015	Southern Miss	9–5	7–1	1st (West)	L Heart of Dallas
Southern Miss:		13–25	9–15		
Total:		13–25			
National championship Conference title Conference division title or championship game berth

=== NFL ===
Team	Year	Regular season					Postseason			
Team	Year	Won	Lost	Ties	Win %	Finish	Won	Lost	Win %	Result
CLE	2026	6	4	0	.600	TBD in AFC North	—	—	—	—
Total		6	4	0	.600		–	–	–	

== Personal life ==
Monken and his wife, Terri, have a son, Travis. Monken is a cousin of Army head coach Jeff Monken. His younger brother, Ted, is the former head football coach for St. Charles East High School and West Chicago Community High School, and current defensive coordinator at Glenbard South High School. Despite growing up in Illinois, Monken grew up a fan of the Green Bay Packers.
