= Everett Mitchell =

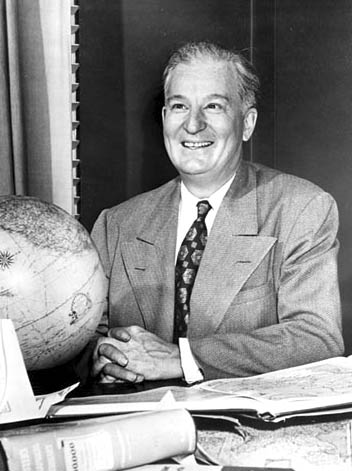
Everett Mitchell.

Everett Mitchell (March 15, 1898, in Oak Park, Illinois – November 12, 1990, in Wheaton, Illinois) was an American gospel singer and radio innovator.

== Early life ==
Growing up impoverished, Everett wore his sister's hand-me-down shoes to school. When working as a child, Mitchell spent his first nickel to buy bread for his family. However, despite working several jobs and being part of the Quaker lineage, Mitchell became one of the great gospel singers. He had learned dozens of hymns at a very young age and was part of the church chorus. Gypsy Smith, a prominent evangelist, noticed Mitchell and hired him as a soloist for Smith's revival service at Pacific Garden Mission in downtown Chicago. Mitchell continued his singing at Winona Lake for four summers.

After high school, Mitchell took a job as a clerk at First Trust and Savings Bank. There, he met Mildred, a bookkeeper, who later become his first wife. After getting married, both realized that their salaries could not support a family, so Mitchell worked at Continental Casualty Company as a claim adjustor while singing part-time at radio station WENR. When his supervisor at the insurance company found out about this, he told Mitchell either leave radio or be fired. Mitchell quit the company and never looked back.

== Radio ==
Working full-time at WENR, he started singing classical music, gospel and jazz. For this, he became popular with the audience, a first in his radio career. One of his classic hits was "Letters to Santa Claus." He was a guest on the late-night talk show, Bedtime Stories for Chorus Girls. He also made history by writing and delivering an early radio commercial, selling Christmas trees by the thousands.

When Mitchell departed WENR for NBC, he joined The National Farm and Home Hour, a program dedicated to presenting livestock reports and light entertainment. As host, he had two main tasks: Be friendly with the audience and be accurate with the reports. Soon, the Great Depression devastated the country, hurling thousands of Americans into financial ruin.

That morning, Mitchell, not discussing his intent with the station management, stepped to the microphone to introduce the show, stating confidently: “It’s a beautiful day in Chicago! It’s a great day to be alive, and I hope it’s even more beautiful wherever you are.” Although the impromptu greeting upset the management, it created a sensation among an audience desperately hungry for a good cheer. The phrase became his signature for the remainder of his career.

Having a love for traveling, Mitchell visited over 50 countries, reporting on agriculture in countries of Europe, Central America, South America and Asia. He was a war correspondent in Korea, investigating famine. In 1950, his first wife, Mildred, died of cancer. In 1952 he married Clara Christenson; they were the parents of one son, Peter Michael. In 1967 Mitchell received the Great Service to America Award, retiring later that year. He died in 1990, in Wheaton, Illinois, where he and his wife lived on Beautiful Day Farm.

== Archives ==
The Everett Mitchell papers, comprising programs, tapes, manuscripts and photographs, is housed at Wheaton College. The collection, donated by his widow, Clara, and Richard Crabb, Mitchell's biographer, is available to researchers.
