= Tony Moeaki =

American football player (born 1987)

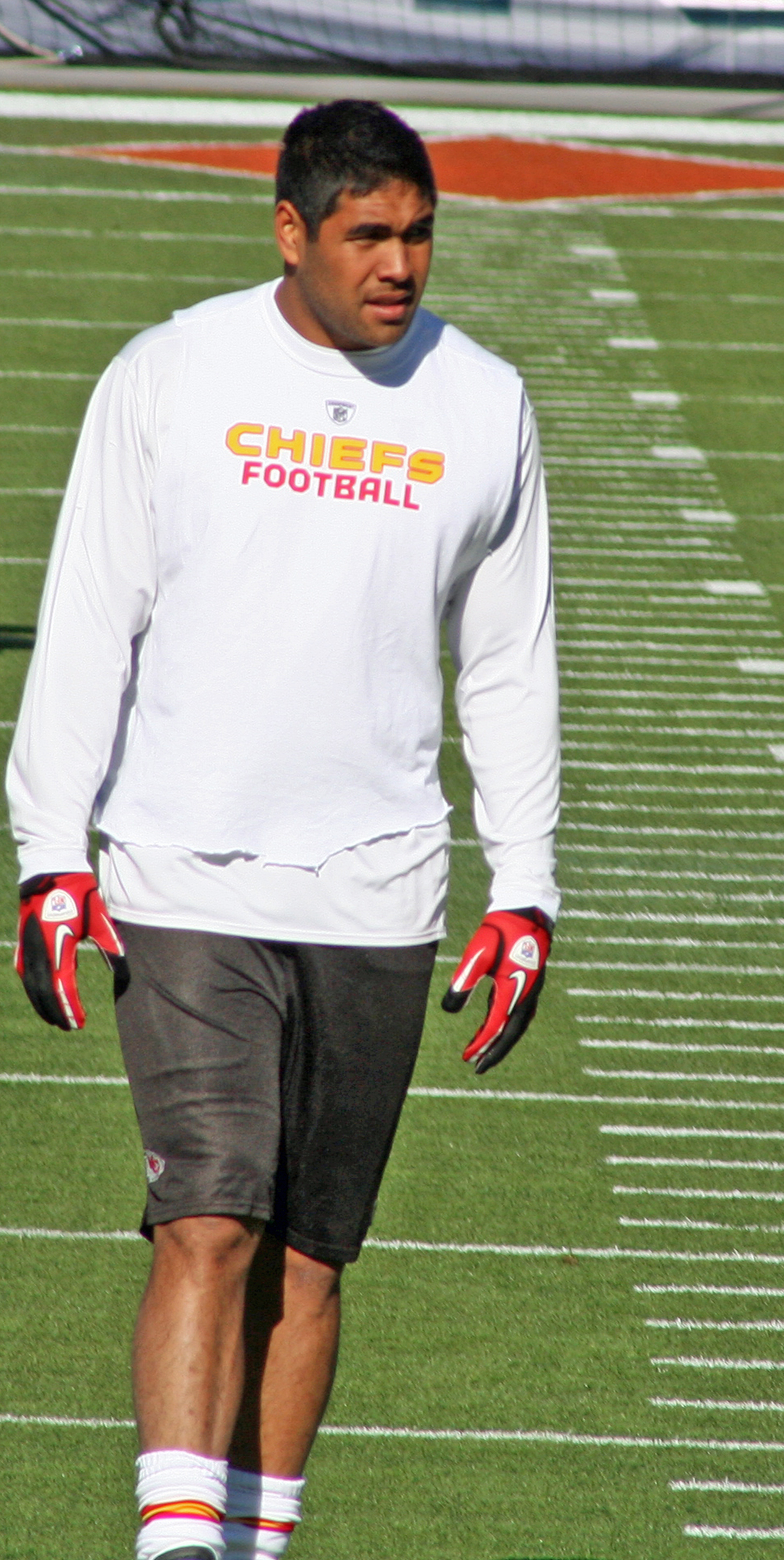
- Moeaki with the Kansas City Chiefs in 2010

No. 81, 82, 88
- Position: Tight end

Personal information
- Born: June 8, 1987 (age 39); Warrenville, Illinois, U.S.
- Listed height: 6 ft 3 in (1.91 m)
- Listed weight: 252 lb (114 kg)

Career information
- High school: Wheaton Warrenville South (Wheaton, Illinois)
- College: Iowa (2005–2009)
- NFL draft: 2010: 3rd round, 93rd overall pick

Career history
- Kansas City Chiefs (2010–2013); Buffalo Bills (2013); Seattle Seahawks (2014); Atlanta Falcons (2015); Chicago Bears (2016)*
- * Offseason or practice squad member only

Awards and highlights
- First-team All-Big Ten (2009); Second-team All-Big Ten (2008)

Career NFL statistics
- Receptions: 91
- Receiving yards: 1,201
- Receiving touchdowns: 6
- Stats at Pro Football Reference

Anthony Aseli Moeaki (born June 8, 1987) is an American former professional football player who was a tight end in the National Football League (NFL). He played college football for the Iowa Hawkeyes. He was selected in the third round of the 2010 NFL draft by the Kansas City Chiefs, and also played for the Buffalo Bills, Seattle Seahawks, and Atlanta Falcons.

== Early life ==
Anthony graduated high school at Wheaton Warrenville South High School in 2005 and was high school football teammates with fellow Iowa Hawkeye Dace Richardson. In addition to football, he was also played basketball and tennis.

== College career ==
Moeaki played college football at the University of Iowa from 2005 to 2009.

=== Statistics ===
Receiving statistics
Year	Team	Rec	Yards	AVG	LG	TD
2005	Iowa Hawkeyes	8	112	14.0	36	0
2006	Iowa Hawkeyes	11	140	12.7	35	3
2007	Iowa Hawkeyes	14	170	12.1	52	3
2008	Iowa Hawkeyes	13	144	11.1	48	1
2009	Iowa Hawkeyes	30	387	12.9	54	4
TOTAL		76	953	12.5	54	11

== Professional career ==
=== Pre-draft ===
Moeaki was projected to be a third or fourth round pick in the 2010 NFL draft by NFL draft experts and scouts. He was ranked as the seventh tight end prospect in the draft by DraftScout.com and was ranked the eighth best tight end by Bleacher Report.

Pre-draft measurables
Height	Weight	Arm length	Hand span	40-yard dash	10-yard split	20-yard split	20-yard shuttle	Three-cone drill	Vertical jump	Broad jump	Bench press
6 ft 3 in (1.91 m)	245 lb (111 kg)	33 1/4 in (0.84 m)	10 1/8 in (0.26 m)	4.69 s	1.60 s	2.71 s	4.38 s	7.05 s	36.5 in (0.93 m)	10 ft 2 in (3.10 m)	20 reps
All values from NFL Combine/Pro Day

=== Kansas City Chiefs ===
The Kansas City Chiefs selected Moeaki in the third round (93rd overall) of the 2010 NFL draft. The Kansas City Chiefs traded their fourth (102nd overall) and fifth round picks (144th overall) in the 2010 NFL draft to the Houston Texans in order to acquire the third round pick (93rd overall) used to draft Moeaki. Moeaki was the fourth tight end drafted from a class that included Rob Gronkowski, Jermaine Gresham, and Jimmy Graham.

On July 22, 2010, the Chiefs signed Moeaki to a four-year, $2.47 million contract. He scored his first NFL touchdown in his first NFL game on Monday Night Football on September 13, on a two-yard pass from quarterback Matt Cassel against the San Diego Chargers. Following the team's game against the San Francisco 49ers, Moeaki received the Pepsi NFL Rookie of the Week award after he recording 44 receiving yards and a spectacular one-handed touchdown grab.

On September 1, 2011, Moeaki was placed on injured reserve after suffering an injury during a preseason game against the Green Bay Packers, which kept him out of the entirety of the 2011 NFL season. Moeaki was reunited with quarterback Ricky Stanzi in 2011 when the Kansas City Chiefs drafted him in the 5th round.

In 2012, Moeaki shared the starting role with Kevin Boss until Boss went on the IR in Week 2, when he became the primary tight end. He ended the year with 33 receptions for 453 yards and a touchdown.

After fracturing his shoulder in the preseason, Moeaki was waived by Kansas City with an injury designation on August 31, 2013. He cleared waivers and was subsequently added to the Chiefs' injured reserve list. On October 23, an injury settlement was reached and Moeaki became a free agent.

=== Buffalo Bills ===
On December 4, 2013, Moeaki signed with the Buffalo Bills. On August 29, 2014, Moeaki was released during the Bills' final preseason roster cutdowns.

=== Seattle Seahawks ===
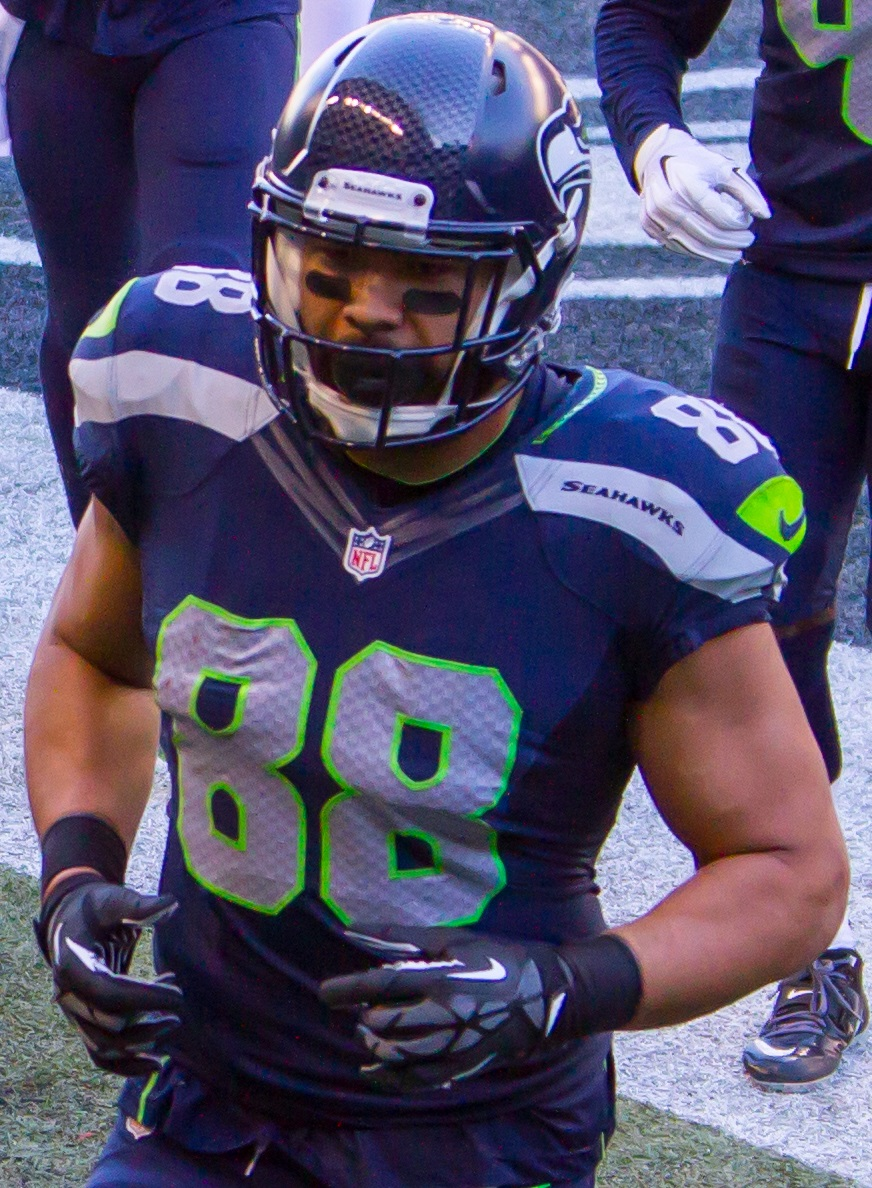
Moeaki with the Seahawks in 2014

Moeaki signed with the Seattle Seahawks on November 4, 2014. In his second game with the Seahawks, Moeaki scored a touchdown against his former team, the Kansas City Chiefs.

=== Atlanta Falcons ===
On March 19, 2015, Moeaki signed with the Atlanta Falcons. On September 5, Moeaki was released by the Falcons. On October 6, Moeaki was re-signed by the Falcons.

=== Chicago Bears ===
On June 16, 2016, Moeaki signed with the Chicago Bears. He was cut by Chicago at the end of training camp on September 3.

== Personal life ==
Moeaki is also a member of The Church of Jesus Christ of Latter-Day Saints.

Moeaki's father, Sione Moeaki, won a national championship as a member of Brigham Young University Rugby Team and was a Deans assistant at West Chicago Community High School.

In 2010, Moeaki's sister and former BYU basketball player, Keilani Moeaki, married former Chicago Bears running back Harvey Unga.
