= Bob Zeman =

American football player (1937–2019)

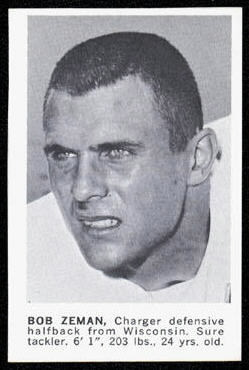

No. 34, 46
- Position: Defensive back

Personal information
- Born: February 22, 1937; Geneva, Illinois, U.S.
- Died: May 3, 2019 (aged 82)
- Listed height: 6 ft 1 in (1.85 m)
- Listed weight: 200 lb (91 kg)

Career information
- High school: Wheaton (Wheaton, Illinois)
- College: Wisconsin
- NFL draft: 1959: 10th round, 119th overall pick
- AFL draft: 1960: 2nd round

Career history

Playing
- Los Angeles / San Diego Chargers (1960-1961); Denver Broncos (1962-1963); New York Jets (1964)*; San Diego Chargers (1965-1966)
- * Offseason or practice squad member only

Coaching
- Joliet Chargers (1967) Assistant coach; Oakland Raiders (1971–1977) Defensive backs coach; Denver Broncos (1978–1982) Linebackers coach; Buffalo Bills (1983) Defensive coordinator & linebackers coach; Los Angeles Raiders (1984–1986) Linebackers coach; San Francisco 49ers (1989–1993) Linebackers coach; London Monarchs (1995) Defensive assistant

Awards and highlights
- 2× Super Bowl champion (XI, XXIV); AFL All-Star (1962)

Career AFL statistics
- Interceptions: 17
- Total touchdowns: 2
- Stats at Pro Football Reference
- Coaching profile at Pro Football Reference

Edward Robert Zeman (February 22, 1937 – May 3, 2019) was an American professional football defensive back who played six seasons in the American Football League (AFL) from 1960 to 1966.

== Playing career ==
=== Early life ===
Zeman attended Wheaton Warrenville South High School in Wheaton, Illinois, the home town as legendary collegiate and professional running back Red Grange. Also himself originally a running back, Zeman managed to break several of the "Galloping Ghost's" high school records. He was later inducted into its Hall of Fame.

=== Wisconsin Badgers ===
Zeman played on both sides of the ball at Wisconsin. However, he never eclipsed 600 yards of rushing, playing mostly defense. After playing in the Rose Bowl his senior year, Zeman met with executives in Los Angeles.

=== Los Angeles/San Diego Chargers ===
Zeman was drafted in the tenth round by the Los Angeles Chargers in the 1960 AFL draft. Zeman was part of a stellar defense nicknamed the "Seven Pirates" — a squad which intercepted an AFL record 49 passes during the 1961 season.

=== Denver Broncos ===
In his first season with the Denver Broncos, Zeman garnered a Pro Bowl selection on the strength of six interceptions; one was returned for a touchdown.

=== Second stint with San Diego ===
Zeman injured his knee at the end of the 1966 season tackling Mike Garrett. He never returned to professional football.

== Coaching history ==
=== College coaching ===
A couple years after retiring as a player, Zeman started to coach at the college level. His first stop was Northwestern, where he coached defensive backs in 1968 and 1969. He then went and coached at his alma mater Wisconsin in 1970.

=== Professional coaching ===
He then coached for the Oakland Raiders between 1971 and 1977, and won Super Bowl XI with the team. Zeman then coached with a team he had played for, the Denver Broncos, between 1978 and 1982. He spent the following year as the defensive coordinator of the Buffalo Bills. His later stops included the Los Angeles Rams, scouting for some teams, and stints with Mike Holmgren in both San Francisco and Seattle.

== Legacy ==
In 2017 Zeman, along with other players from the inaugural year, presented the Chargers organization with a signed ball for its move back to the city of Los Angeles.

== See also ==
- List of American Football League players
