= James H. Monroe =

United States Army Medal of Honor recipient

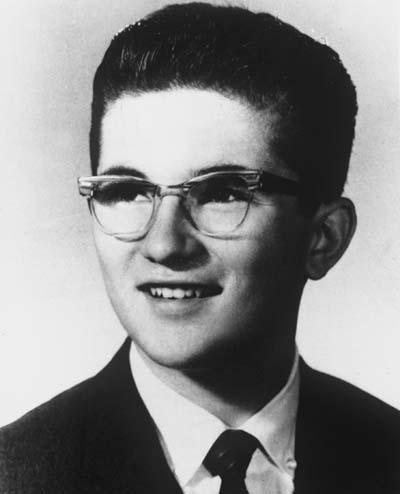
- Private First Class James Monroe
- Born: October 17, 1944; Aurora, Illinois, US
- Died: February 16, 1967 (aged 22); Bồng Sơn, Binh Dinh Province, Republic of Vietnam
- Burial place: Wheaton Cemetery, Wheaton, Illinois
- Military career
- Allegiance: United States
- Branch: United States Army
- Service years: 1966–1967
- Rank: Private First Class
- Units: 1st Battalion, 8th Cavalry Regiment, 1st Cavalry Division
- Conflicts: Vietnam War †
- Awards: Medal of Honor

James Howard Monroe (October 17, 1944 – February 16, 1967) was a United States Army soldier and a recipient of the United States military's highest decoration of honor the Medal of Honor, for his actions as a combat medic in the Vietnam War.

== Biography ==
Monroe was born in Aurora, Illinois, and attended Wheaton Central High School in nearby Wheaton, Illinois. He participated in football and the biology club before graduating in 1962. He then studied political science at Washington and Lee University in Lexington, Virginia, but left before graduating and was drafted into the U.S. Army in June 1966.

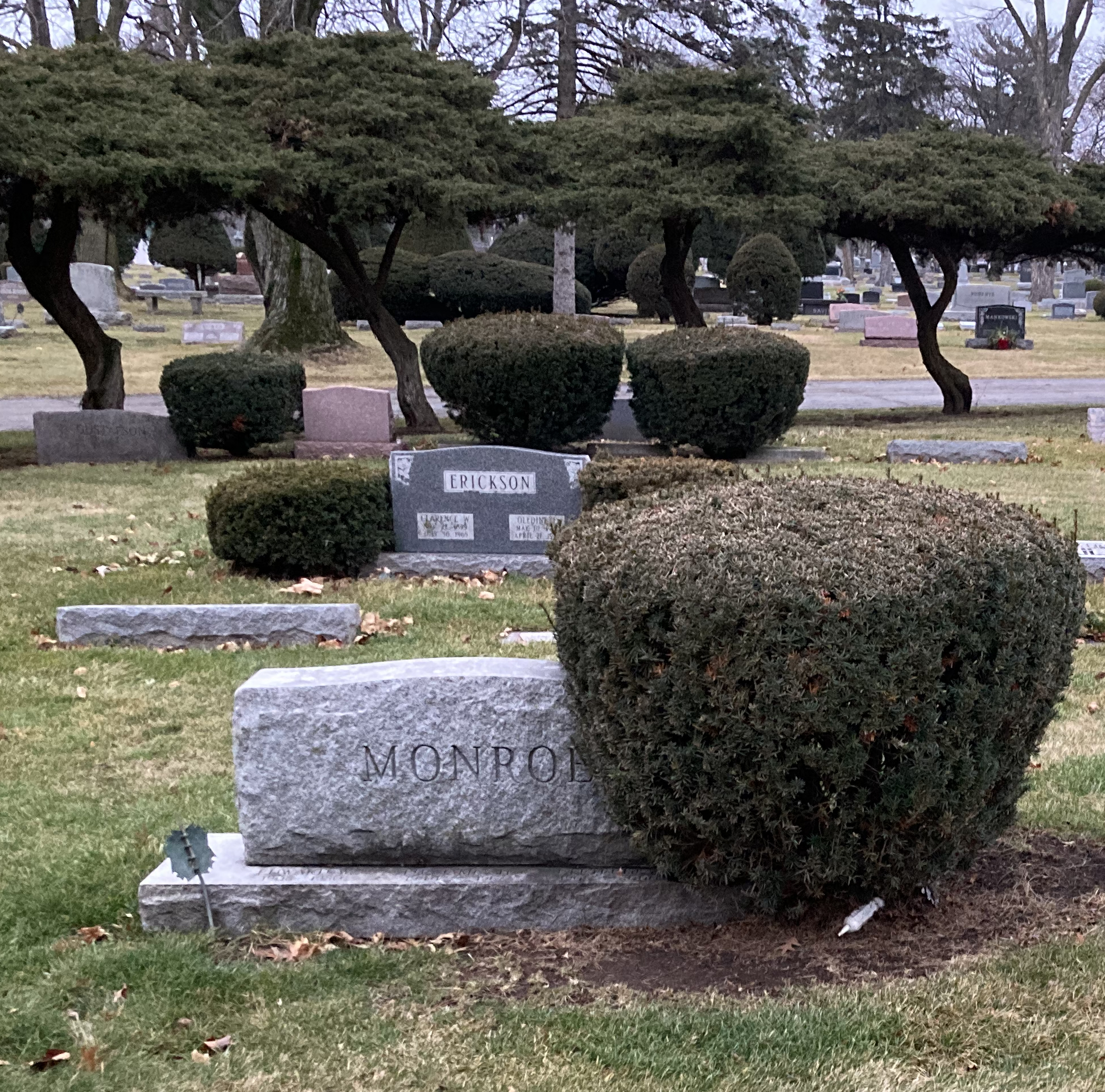
Monroe's grave at Wheaton Cemetery

Monroe was sent to Vietnam in November 1966 as a private first class serving as a medic in the Headquarters and Headquarters Company of the 1st Battalion, 8th Cavalry Regiment, 1st Cavalry Division (Airmobile). On February 16, 1967, in Bồng Sơn, Hoài Nhơn District, South Vietnam, Monroe crossed through enemy fire to treat wounded soldiers and smothered the blast of a grenade with his body, sacrificing his own life to protect those around him.

Monroe, age 22 at his death, was buried at Wheaton Cemetery in Wheaton, Illinois.

His family was formally presented with his Medal of Honor during a ceremony at the Pentagon on what would have been his twenty-fourth birthday, October 17, 1968. Monroe Middle School in Wheaton is named in his honor, and his medal is on display at the school.

A medical clinic on Fort Hood is named in his honor, as is James Howard Monroe Middle School, which is located in Wheaton.

== Medal of Honor citation ==
Private First Class Monroe's official Medal of Honor citation reads:

For conspicuous gallantry and intrepidity in action at the risk of his life above and beyond the call of duty. His platoon was deployed in a night ambush when the position was suddenly subjected to an intense and accurate grenade attack, and 1 foxhole was hit immediately. Responding without hesitation to the calls for help from the wounded men Pfc. Monroe moved forward through heavy small-arms fire to the foxhole but found that all of the men had expired. He turned immediately and crawled back through the deadly hail of fire toward other calls for aid. He moved to the platoon sergeant's position where he found the radio operator bleeding profusely from fragmentation and bullet wounds. Ignoring the continuing enemy attack, Pfc. Monroe began treating the wounded man when he saw a live grenade fall directly in front of the position. He shouted a warning to all those nearby, pushed the wounded radio operator and the platoon sergeant to one side, and lunged forward to smother the grenade's blast with his body. Through his valorous actions, performed in a flash of inspired selflessness, Pfc. Monroe saved the lives of 2 of his comrades and prevented the probable injury of several others. His gallantry and intrepidity were in the highest traditions of the U.S. Army, and reflect great credit upon himself and the Armed Forces of his country.

== See also ==
- List of Medal of Honor recipients for the Vietnam War
