= Miles J. Stanford =

American Christian author (1914–1999)

Miles J. Stanford (January 4, 1914 – September 21, 1999) was an American Christian author best known for his classic collection on spirituality, The Green Letters, published in 1964.

== Biography ==
Born in 1914 in Wheaton, Illinois, and with little or no Sunday school background, his early life centered around baseball, golf, and alcohol to excess.

On September 19, 1940, Stanford became a [believer] and after that began studying the Bible eight to ten hours daily. He joined the US Army Engineers in 1942 and served overseas as a cartographer for a year in England and nearly two years in Germany. During this time he developed an ongoing correspondence with other Christians so that in late 1945, when he was discharged from the Army, he was writing to nearly 200 people.

From 1946 to 1955, his study and correspondence continued to expand. In 1951, he met and married Cornelia de Villiers Schwab in Brooklyn, New York. Cornelia shared a similar desire for personal growth and to help other Christians develop spiritually. Subsequently, Miles and Cornelia moved to Warrenville, Illinois and assumed heavy responsibilities in a local Bible church, Pleasant Hill Community Church. The correspondence rapidly expanded during the next seven years. In 1960, The Green Letters series began, with letters going out to 1,500 correspondents every other month for three years.

In 1962, the ministry was relocated to Colorado Springs, Colorado, and for nearly four decades Stanford published other books and (with Cornelia) maintained the robust and growing correspondence ministry. He established his website in 1996, making many of his publications available for free online.

At the age of 85 and after nearly 50 years of ascension ministry, Stanford died on September 21, 1999.

== Theology ==
Theologically, Stanford called himself Pauline and Dispensationalist. He drew upon the written ministries of William Newell, Lewis Sperry Chafer, and a number of the original Plymouth Brethren, in particular John Nelson Darby.

The historical and theological significance of Stanford was his careful and exhaustive exposition of the believer's positional and conditional aspects in the "First Adam" (Adam) and the "Last Adam" (Jesus). Not only did he set forth these Pauline doctrines of the Christian's "death, burial, resurrection, and ascension with Christ", he comprehensively documented their "life-out-of-death" application in the Christian's experiential "walk with Christ." The motive for the work of the Holy Spirit, the object of the Christian's "progressive spiritual growth", is "intimate fellowship with God the Father and God the Son, above in the heavenlies". As Stanford was apt to exhort believers, "Abide Above – for your life below."

Because of Stanford's focus upon the doctrinal content of the Pauline Epistles, some evangelicals have erroneously identified him with hyper-dispensationalism. To address this, Stanford published numerous papers during the 1980s and 1990s clarifying the distinctive tenets of "Pauline Dispensationalism." A collection of fourteen papers were collected into his 1993 book of the same name.

Stanford typically signed his letters with his hallmark salutation, "Resting in Him."

== Selected publications ==
- The Green Letters, 1964. ISBN 0-310-33001-7
- The Red Letters, 1965.
- The Reckoning That Counts, 1966.
- The Principle of Position, 1967. ISBN 0-310-33021-1
- Abide Above, 1970.
- The Ground of Growth, 1971. ISBN 0-310-33011-4
- The Line Drawn, 1972.
- Spiritual Sharing Service, 1973.
- None But the Hungry Heart, 1973–1987.
- The Complete Green Letters, 1975. ISBN 0-310-33051-3
- The New Birth Explained, 1977.
- Pauline Dispensationalism, 1993.
- Position Papers – A Spiritual Anthology, 1994.

In addition, Stanford wrote and distributed hundreds of polemics and position papers.
