= Jim Juriga =

American football player (born 1964)

No. 66
- Position: Offensive lineman

Personal information
- Born: September 12, 1964 (age 62); Fort Wayne, Indiana, U.S.
- Listed height: 6 ft 6 in (1.98 m)
- Listed weight: 269 lb (122 kg)

Career information
- High school: Wheaton North (Illinois)
- College: Illinois
- NFL draft: 1986: 4th round, 104th overall pick

Career history
- Denver Broncos (1986–1991)

Awards and highlights
- 2× Second-team All-American (1983, 1984); 3× First-team All-Big Ten (1983, 1984, 1985)

Career NFL statistics
- Games played: 44
- Games started: 42
- Stats at Pro Football Reference

James Allen Juriga (born September 12, 1964) is an American former professional football player who was an offensive lineman in the National Football League (NFL).

Juriga was born in Fort Wayne, Indiana and played scholastically at Wheaton North High School in Wheaton, Illinois. He played collegiately for the Illinois Fighting Illini, where he was honored twice by United Press International as a second-team All-American.

Juriga was selected by the Denver Broncos in the fourth round of the 1986 NFL draft with the 104th overall pick. He was with the Broncos for four seasons, spending the last one on injured reserve. He started in Super Bowl XXIV for the Broncos.

After he finished his football career, he obtained his doctor of veterinary medicine degree from Colorado State University. He lives with his wife Denise in Geneva, Illinois. His son Luke played college football for Western Michigan.
