= List of The Real Housewives of New Jersey episodes =

The Real Housewives of New Jersey is an American reality television series that debuted on May 12, 2009, and airs on Bravo. It is the network's fourth installation of The Real Housewives franchise. The series' upcoming fifteenth season chronicles eight women in and around several communities in northern New Jersey—Teresa Giudice, Melissa Gorga, Dolores Catania, Malvina Blloshmi, Xio Cammarota, Juliette Collazo, Deeba Patel and Natia Rufolo —as they balance their personal and business lives, along with their social circle.

Former cast members featured over the previous seasons are: Dina Manzo (1–2, 6), Jacqueline Laurita (1–5, 7), Caroline Manzo (1–5), Danielle Staub (1–2), Kathy Wakile (3–5), Teresa Aprea (6), Amber Marchese (6), Nicole Napolitano (6), Siggy Flicker (7–8), Margaret Josephs (8–14), Jennifer Aydin, (9–14), Jackie Goldschneider (9–12), Danielle Cabral (13–14), and Rachel Fuda (13–14).

As of August 11, 2024, a total of 249 original episodes of The Real Housewives of New Jersey have aired.

== Series overview ==
The Real Housewives of New Jersey episodes
Season	Episodes	Originally released		Average Viewers (millions)
Season	Episodes	First released	Last released	Average Viewers (millions)
1	10	May 12, 2009	July 9, 2009	2.25
2	18	May 3, 2010	September 6, 2010	2.74
3	21	May 16, 2011	October 23, 2011	2.66
4	24	April 22, 2012	October 21, 2012	2.66
5	22	June 2, 2013	October 20, 2013	2.29
6	19	July 13, 2014	November 20, 2014	1.86
7	18	July 10, 2016	November 13, 2016	1.54
8	16	October 4, 2017	January 31, 2018	1.24
9	18	November 7, 2018	March 6, 2019	1.22
10	19	November 6, 2019	March 18, 2020	1.18
11	15	February 17, 2021	May 26, 2021	1.05
12	16	February 1, 2022	May 17, 2022	1.04
13	19	February 7, 2023	June 13, 2023	0.93
14	14	May 5, 2024	August 11, 2024	0.73
15	TBA	January 19, 2027	TBA	TBA

== Episodes ==
=== Season 1 (2009) ===
Teresa Giudice, Jacqueline Laurita, Caroline Manzo, Dina Manzo and Danielle Staub are introduced as series regulars.

The Real Housewives of New Jersey season 1 episodes
No. overall	No. in season	Title	Original release date	U.S. viewers (millions)
1	1	"Thicker Than Water"	May 12, 2009	1.72
2	2	"Mamas Knows Best"	May 19, 2009	1.49
3	3	"Not One of Us"	May 26, 2009	1.69
4	4	"Black & White and Read All Over"	June 2, 2009	N/A
5	5	"Casinos and C-Cups"	June 9, 2009	N/A
6	6	"Finale"	June 16, 2009	3.47
7	7	"The Last Supper"	June 18, 2009	1.13
8	8	"Watch What Happens Reunion: Part One"	June 23, 2009	2.89
9	9	"Watch What Happens Reunion: Part Two"	June 25, 2009	N/A
10	10	"The Lost Footage"	July 9, 2009	N/A

=== Season 2 (2010) ===
Dina departed as a series regular after episode 7. Kim Granatell served in a recurring capacity.

The Real Housewives of New Jersey season 2 episodes
No. overall	No. in season	Title	Original release date	U.S. viewers (millions)
11	1	"Water Under the Table"	May 3, 2010	2.33
12	2	"Generation Vexed"	May 10, 2010	2.00
13	3	"Catty-Walk"	May 17, 2010	2.03
14	4	"Babies, Bubbles and Bubbies"	May 24, 2010	2.16
15	5	"Into the Lion's Den"	May 31, 2010	N/A
16	6	"It's Not Me, It's You"	June 7, 2010	2.43
17	7	"Play at Your Own Risk"	June 14, 2010	2.74
18	8	"Bubbies Gone Bad"	June 21, 2010	2.84
19	9	"Posche Spite"	June 28, 2010	2.71
20	10	"Country Clubbed"	July 12, 2010	3.28
21	11	"Staub Wounds"	July 19, 2010	2.74
22	12	"Youth Will Be Served"	July 26, 2010	2.58
23	13	"Don't Drink the Holy Water"	August 2, 2010	2.64
24	14	"The Chanels of Venice"	August 9, 2010	3.08
25	15	"Hills Are Alive With Giudice"	August 16, 2010	2.58
26	16	"The Heads of Family Will Roll"	August 23, 2010	3.36
27	17	"Reunion: Part 1"^{†}	August 30, 2010	3.85
28	18	"Reunion: Part 2"^{†}	September 6, 2010	3.21

=== Season 3 (2011) ===
Staub departed as a series regular. Melissa Gorga and Kathy Wakile joined the cast.

The Real Housewives of New Jersey season 3 episodes
No. overall	No. in season	Title	Original release date	U.S. viewers (millions)
29	1	"In the Name of the Father"	May 16, 2011	2.83
30	2	"Drop Dead Gorgas"	May 23, 2011	2.73
31	3	"Sealed With a Diss"	May 30, 2011	2.49
32	4	"Gobblefellas"	June 6, 2011	2.47
33	5	"Stick It"	June 12, 2011	2.59
34	6	"Whine and Dine"	June 19, 2011	2.53
35	7	"Teresa's Got a Gun"	June 26, 2011	2.03
36	8	"Holidazed and Confused"	July 10, 2011	2.21
37	9	"Twas the Fight Before Christmas"	July 17, 2011	2.53
38	10	"There Arose Such a Clatter"	July 24, 2011	2.92
39	11	"A Very Jersey Christmas"	July 31, 2011	2.83
40	12	"Auld Lang Syne for an Eye"	August 7, 2011	2.32
41	13	"Child's Play No More"	August 14, 2011	2.74
42	14	"Belly Up & Up"	August 21, 2011	2.69
43	15	"Black as Ink"	August 28, 2011	2.38
44	16	"Singing in the Pain"	September 11, 2011	2.67
45	17	"Get to the Punta!"	September 18, 2011	2.88
46	18	"Blood Is Thicker Than Guccis"	October 2, 2011	2.47
47	19	"Portrait of an Italian Family"	October 9, 2011	2.67
48	20	"Reunion: Part 1"	October 16, 2011	3.44
49	21	"Reunion: Part 2"	October 23, 2011	3.39

=== Season 4 (2012) ===
Kim DePaola served in a recurring capacity.

The Real Housewives of New Jersey season 4 episodes
No. overall	No. in season	Title	Original release date	U.S. viewers (millions)
50	1	"High Tide, Low Blow"	April 22, 2012	2.95
51	2	"Poker Face"	April 29, 2012	2.24
52	3	"Third Eye Blind"	May 6, 2012	2.54
53	4	"Drowning Pool"	May 13, 2012	2.25
54	5	"Spoiled Sports"	May 20, 2012	2.34
55	6	"Uncivil Union"	June 3, 2012	2.48
56	7	"True Love, True Lies"	June 10, 2012	2.29
57	8	"Best Friends for Never"	June 17, 2012	2.65
58	9	"Public Display of Rejection"	June 24, 2012	2.87
59	10	"Temporary Shrinkage"	July 1, 2012	2.28
60	11	"The Sniff Test"	July 8, 2012	2.51
61	12	"The Jersey Side Step"	July 15, 2012	2.64
62	13	"Sit Down and Man Up"	July 22, 2012	2.34
63	14	"Pack Your Baggage"	July 29, 2012	2.06
64	15	"If This RV is a Rockin'"	August 12, 2012	2.23
65	16	"Whine Country"	August 19, 2012	2.98
66	17	"Hot Tub of Sour Grapes"	August 26, 2012	3.10
67	18	"Dinasty of Denial"	September 9, 2012	2.96
68	19	"A Bald Canary Sings"	September 16, 2012	2.74
69	20	"Strip Down Memory Lane"	September 23, 2012	3.40
70	21	"Reunion: Part 1"	September 30, 2012	3.49
71	22	"Reunion: Part 2"	October 7, 2012	3.59
72	23	"Reunion: Part 3"	October 14, 2012	3.30
73	24	"The Lost Footage"	October 21, 2012	1.64

=== Season 5 (2013) ===
DePaola and Jennifer Dalton served in recurring capacities.

The Real Housewives of New Jersey season 5 episodes
No. overall	No. in season	Title	Original release date	U.S. viewers (millions)
74	1	"Garden State of Emergency"	June 2, 2013	2.84
75	2	"A Manzo of Her Word"	June 9, 2013	2.45
76	3	"It's My Party and I'll Fight if I Want To"	June 16, 2013	2.11
77	4	"Gym Rats"	June 23, 2013	2.41
78	5	"Everything Is Coming Up Rosie"	June 30, 2013	2.19
79	6	"Drinking With the Enemy"	July 7, 2013	2.17
80	7	"When Joes Collide"	July 14, 2013	2.70
81	8	"Scum One, Scum All"	July 21, 2013	2.83
82	9	"On Thin Guid-Ice"	July 28, 2013	2.48
83	10	"Best Frenemies Forever"	August 4, 2013	2.57
84	11	"Children of the Scorned"	August 11, 2013	2.41
85	12	"Hair-Binger of Doom"	August 18, 2013	2.29
86	13	"Spaghetti Western & Meatballs"	August 25, 2013	2.38
87	14	"Horse Whisper to a Scream"	September 1, 2013	1.82
88	15	"Zen Things I Hate About You"	September 8, 2013	2.25
89	16	"The Blonde Drops a Bombshell"	September 15, 2013	2.40
90	17	"Hair We Go Again"	September 22, 2013	2.47
91	18	"Salon, Farewell"	September 29, 2013	2.50
92	19	"Reunion: Part 1"	October 6, 2013	2.49
93	20	"Reunion: Part 2"	October 13, 2013	2.09
94	21	"The Real Housewives Tell All — Part 1"	October 14, 2013	0.94
95	22	"The Real Housewives Tell All — Part 2"	October 20, 2013	1.50

=== Season 6 (2014) ===
Laurita, Caroline, and Wakile departed as series regulars; Laurita and Wakile continued to appear in recurring capacities. Dina rejoined the cast as a series regular. Teresa Aprea, Amber Marchese and Nicole Napolitano joined the cast.

The Real Housewives of New Jersey season 6 episodes
No. overall	No. in season	Title	Original release date	U.S. viewers (millions)
96	1	"What a Difference a Plea Makes"	July 13, 2014	2.14
97	2	"O, Christmas Tre"	July 20, 2014	1.64
98	3	"Trash-Talking"	July 27, 2014	1.89
99	4	"A Hairy Situation"	August 3, 2014	1.75
100	5	"One Flew Over the Chicken's Nest"	August 10, 2014	2.01
101	6	"The Family Business"	August 17, 2014	1.71
102	7	"Roses Are Red, Dina Is Blue"	August 24, 2014	1.83
103	8	"Guilt Trip"	September 7, 2014	1.82
104	9	"There Will Be Bloodwork"	September 14, 2014	1.83
105	10	"The Day of Jacqueline"	September 21, 2014	2.01
106	11	"Gators and Haters"	September 28, 2014	1.91
107	12	"Pack Your Bags and Get Out!"	October 5, 2014	2.26
108	13	"Sorry, Not Sorry"	October 12, 2014	2.18
109	14	"Judgement Day"	October 19, 2014	2.44
110	15	"Secrets Revealed Part 1"	October 26, 2014	1.80
111	16	"Reunion Part 1"	November 2, 2014	2.23
112	17	"Reunion Part 2"	November 6, 2014	1.40
113	18	"Reunion Part 3"	November 11, 2014	1.63
114	19	"Secrets Revealed Part 2"	November 20, 2014	0.86

=== Season 7 (2016) ===
Dina, Aprea, Marchese, and Napolitano departed as series regulars. Laurita rejoined the cast as a series regular. Dolores Catania and Siggy Flicker joined the cast. Wakile and Rosie Pierri served in recurring capacities.

The Real Housewives of New Jersey season 7 episodes
No. overall	No. in season	Title	Original release date	U.S. viewers (millions)
115	1	"Jingle Bells and Prison Cells"	July 10, 2016	1.74
116	2	"A Very Hairy Christmas"	July 17, 2016	1.63
117	3	"Leopard Is the New Black"	July 24, 2016	1.55
118	4	"A Life to Envy"	July 31, 2016	1.54
119	5	"Dinner Interrupted"	August 14, 2016	0.86
120	6	"Swimming with the Gefilte Fishes"	August 21, 2016	1.38
121	7	"Spa-Cation"	August 28, 2016	1.35
122	8	"All Bets Are Off"	September 5, 2016	1.59
123	9	"Driving Miss Siggy"	September 11, 2016	1.58
124	10	"Cut The Cancer Out"	September 18, 2016	1.52
125	11	"Rage On My Ass"	September 25, 2016	1.71
126	12	"The Other C Word"	October 2, 2016	1.80
127	13	"Picking Sides"	October 9, 2016	1.37
128	14	"The Importance of Being Family"	October 16, 2016	1.73
129	15	"Nama'Stay Away From Me"	October 23, 2016	1.69
130	16	"And Then There Were Four"	October 30, 2016	1.67
131	17	"Reunion Part One"	November 6, 2016	1.91
132	18	"Reunion Part Two"	November 13, 2016	1.94

=== Season 8 (2017–2018) ===
Laurita departed as a series regular. Margaret Josephs joined the cast. Staub served in a recurring capacity.

The Real Housewives of New Jersey season 8 episodes
No. overall	No. in season	Title	Original release date	U.S. viewers (millions)
133	1	"Shaddy Beach"	October 4, 2017	1.44
134	2	"Let Them Eat Cake"	October 11, 2017	1.26
135	3	"The Apology"	October 18, 2017	1.29
136	4	"The Public Shaming of Melissa"	October 25, 2017	1.27
137	5	"Not Over It"	November 1, 2017	1.26
138	6	"Growing Up Jersey"	November 8, 2017	1.11
139	7	"A Retreat to Remember"	November 15, 2017	1.20
140	8	"Walking on Broken Glass"	November 29, 2017	1.16
141	9	"When Chairs Fly"	December 6, 2017	1.23
142	10	"Meltdown in Milan"	December 13, 2017	1.22
143	11	"Fauxpology"	December 20, 2017	1.16
144	12	"Ain't No Misbehaving"	January 3, 2018	1.31
145	13	"Prisons, Proposals and Parties"	January 10, 2018	1.26
146	14	"Reunion Part 1"	January 17, 2018	1.39
147	15	"Reunion Part 2"	January 24, 2018	1.30
148	16	"Reunion Secrets Revealed"	January 31, 2018	0.97

=== Season 9 (2018–2019) ===
Flicker departed as a series regular. Jennifer Aydin and Jackie Goldschneider joined the cast. Staub served in a recurring capacity.

The Real Housewives of New Jersey season 9 episodes
No. overall	No. in season	Title	Original release date	U.S. viewers (millions)
149	1	"Wives and Misdemeanors"	November 7, 2018	1.19
150	2	"Easter Wives Hunt"	November 14, 2018	1.02
151	3	"The Jersey Breakfast Club"	November 21, 2018	0.92
152	4	"Housewives & Heifers"	November 28, 2018	1.14
153	5	"Turkish Delights"	December 5, 2018	1.15
154	6	"Last Fling Before the Ring"	December 12, 2018	1.00
155	7	"Brunch Gone Bad"	December 19, 2018	1.18
156	8	"Bridezilla of Bimini"	December 30, 2018	1.37
157	9	"Communion and Confession"	January 2, 2019	1.18
158	10	"From Turkey with Love"	January 9, 2019	1.29
159	11	"Whine Country"	January 16, 2019	1.12
160	12	"Mudslinging in Mexico"	January 23, 2019	1.32
161	13	"Camels, Cabo & Catfights"	January 30, 2019	1.41
162	14	"Heroines in Heels"	February 6, 2019	1.31
163	15	"Hotheads and Hookahs"	February 13, 2019	1.20
164	16	"Reunion Part 1"	February 20, 2019	1.36
165	17	"Reunion Part 2"	February 27, 2019	1.36
166	18	"Reunion Part 3"	March 6, 2019	1.50

=== Season 10 (2019–2020) ===
Staub served in a recurring capacity.

The Real Housewives of New Jersey season 10 episodes
No. overall	No. in season	Title	Original release date	U.S. viewers (millions)
-	-	"Joe and Teresa: Unlocked"	October 27, 2019	1.27
167	1	"Sex, Lies and Video Debates"	November 6, 2019	1.23
168	2	"On Lock Down"	November 13, 2019	1.06
169	3	"40 and Fancy Free"	November 20, 2019	1.01
170	4	"Jamaican Jailbait"	November 27, 2019	0.96
171	5	"Cut from a Different Cloth"	December 4, 2019	1.09
172	6	"Baby Breezes and Bad News"	December 11, 2019	1.01
173	7	"The Last Supper"	December 18, 2019	0.95
174	8	"Hair Today, Gone Tomorrow"	January 1, 2020	1.19
175	9	"Abs & Jabs"	January 8, 2020	1.30
176	10	"Mama Drama"	January 15, 2020	1.14
177	11	"Clearing the Heir"	January 22, 2020	1.26
178	12	"The Hamptons Hangover"	January 29, 2020	1.30
179	13	"Sorry Not Sorry"	February 5, 2020	1.29
180	14	"Something in the Water"	February 12, 2020	1.13
181	15	"Secrets Revealed"	February 19, 2020	1.18
182	16	"Family Reunion"	February 26, 2020	1.35
183	17	"Reunion Part 1"	March 4, 2020	1.28
184	18	"Reunion Part 2"	March 11, 2020	1.31
185	19	"Reunion Part 3"	March 18, 2020	1.32

=== Season 11 (2021) ===
The Real Housewives of New Jersey season 11 episodes
No. overall	No. in season	Title	Original release date	U.S. viewers (millions)
186	1	"C U Next Tuesday?"	February 17, 2021	1.13
187	2	"Licked Up and Down"	February 24, 2021	1.09
188	3	"Guys Gone Wild"	March 3, 2021	1.09
189	4	"Redo and Rewind"	March 10, 2021	1.03
190	5	"Kiss My Peach"	March 17, 2021	1.00
191	6	"Dildos Down the Shore"	March 24, 2021	1.03
192	7	"Old Feuds Never Die"	March 31, 2021	1.11
193	8	"Memorial Mayhem"	April 7, 2021	1.01
194	9	"Pineapple Puss"	April 14, 2021	1.05
195	10	"Sinking Ships"	April 21, 2021	0.97
196	11	"Teresa in Love"	April 28, 2021	1.02
197	12	"Teresa's Mystery Man"	May 5, 2021	1.06
198	13	"House of Horrors"	May 12, 2021	1.01
199	14	"Reunion Part 1"	May 19, 2021	1.08
200	15	"Reunion Part 2"	May 26, 2021	N/A

=== Season 12 (2022) ===
Traci Johnson served in a recurring capacity.

The Real Housewives of New Jersey season 12 episodes
No. overall	No. in season	Title	Original release date	U.S. viewers (millions)
201	1	"Smoke, Mirrors and Foggy Diamonds"	February 1, 2022	1.10
202	2	"House of Hypocrisy"	February 8, 2022	0.89
203	3	"A Very Jersey Kegger"	February 15, 2022	1.04
204	4	"Shady Down the Shore"	February 22, 2022	0.98
205	5	"Jersey Shore Showdown"	March 1, 2022	1.01
206	6	"Bromance Breakup"	March 8, 2022	0.96
207	7	"Allegation Aggravation"	March 15, 2022	1.04
208	8	"Forest of Fury"	March 22, 2022	1.00
209	9	"There's No Crying in Softball"	March 29, 2022	0.98
210	10	"The Horny Hungarians"	April 5, 2022	1.11
211	11	"Nightmare in Nashvegas"	April 12, 2022	0.98
212	12	"Lady Drama Mamas"	April 19, 2022	1.11
213	13	"Showdown in Smashville"	April 26, 2022	1.17
214	14	"Reunion Part 1"	May 3, 2022	1.12
215	15	"Reunion Part 2"	May 10, 2022	1.13
216	16	"Reunion Part 3"	May 17, 2022	1.09

=== Season 13 (2023) ===
Goldschneider departed as a series regular and continued to appear in a recurring capacity. Danielle Cabral and Rachel Fuda joined the cast. Jennifer Fessler also served in a recurring capacity.

The Real Housewives of New Jersey season 13 episodes
No. overall	No. in season	Title	Original release date	U.S. viewers (millions)
217	1	"New Friends, Same Jersey"	February 7, 2023	0.85
218	2	"Family, Family, Family"	February 14, 2023	0.86
219	3	"Boys Will Be Boys"	February 21, 2023	0.87
220	4	"Housewarming History Lesson"	February 28, 2023	0.87
221	5	"Driving Miss Crazy"	March 7, 2023	0.79
222	6	"All Bats Are Off"	March 14, 2023	0.82
223	7	"Shots and Shade"	March 21, 2023	0.87
224	8	"Pizza Gate"	March 28, 2023	0.94
225	9	"Coffee Talk"	April 4, 2023	0.85
226	10	"The Italian Invasion"	April 11, 2023	0.90
227	11	"I Smell a Rat"	April 18, 2023	0.77
228	12	"Sláinte!"	April 25, 2023	0.97
229	13	"Messes & Bridesmaid Dresses"	May 2, 2023	0.83
230	14	"Rat in the Street"	May 9, 2023	0.82
231	15	"Flappers of Fury"	May 16, 2023	1.02
232	16	"Teresa Gets Married"	May 23, 2023	0.98
233	17	"Reunion Part 1"	May 30, 2023	1.18
234	18	"Reunion Part 2"	June 6, 2023	1.19
235	19	"Reunion Part 3"	June 13, 2023	1.25

=== Season 14 (2024) ===
Goldschneider and Fessler served in recurring capacities.

The Real Housewives of New Jersey season 14 episodes
No. overall	No. in season	Title	Original release date	U.S. viewers (millions)
236	1	"Birthday Bombshell"	May 5, 2024	0.84
237	2	"The Icing on the Brain Cake"	May 12, 2024	0.74
238	3	"Shore-ing Up Sides"	May 19, 2024	0.70
239	4	"A League of Their Own Worst Enemy"	May 26, 2024	0.62
240	5	"Glitz & Blitz"	June 2, 2024	0.75
241	6	"Margs & Marriage"	June 9, 2024	0.70
242	7	"Gifts & Receipts"	June 16, 2024	0.67
243	8	"Trouble in Tulum"	June 23, 2024	0.79
244	9	"Behind Frenemy Lines"	June 30, 2024	0.79
245	10	"Inner Piece of My Mind"	July 14, 2024	0.76
246	11	"Sleepover With One Eye Open"	July 21, 2024	0.72
247	12	"Don't Trial This at Home"	July 28, 2024	0.59
248	13	"When All Is Said and Done"	August 4, 2024	0.87
249	14	"Off the Rails"	August 11, 2024	0.71
