= My Big Gay Italian Wedding =

- Original language: English
- Written by: Anthony J. Wilkinson
- Subject: Same-sex marriage

Premiere
- Date: November 14, 2003
- Place: Actor's Playhouse; New York City
- Official website

My Big Gay Italian Wedding is a play written by Anthony J. Wilkinson that premiered off-Broadway in 2003, at the Actor's Playhouse in New York City. In September 2009, an updated version co-starring Scott Evans and with choreography by J. Austin Eyer played a benefit performance at the St. George Theatre in Staten Island. The play then opened with a new cast that included Reichen Lehmkuhl in May 2010 at the St. Luke's Theatre on West 46th Street, in Manhattan, for an open-ended run that concluded in August 2015.

The show originated in 2003 as a non-union Off-Broadway show and in 2010 became a full union production, extending fourteen times in the same location. During the run, the show hosted some major celebrities in efforts to help raise money and awareness for marriage equality and the Trevor Project.

In 2010 the show was published by Samuel French for licensing purposes. Aside from New York City, the show has already played in over thirty cities in the United States. Internationally the show has had runs in Edinburgh, London, Ireland, Sydney, Hong Kong, parts of Canada and parts of France.

An Italian film based on the play, called Puoi baciare lo sposo (You can kiss the groom), premiered in Italy on March 1, 2018.

== Synopsis ==
My Big Gay Italian Wedding satirizes the controversies surrounding same-sex marriage as well as gay and Italian stereotypes. Anthony Pinnunziato, a gay Italian-American from a large chaotic family, wishes to marry his boyfriend Andrew Polinski in a traditional Italian ceremony. Anthony's overbearing mother won't give her blessing unless Andrew's estranged mother also gives her blessing and the ceremony is performed by a priest. Matters are further complicated by Andrew's ex-boyfriend, intent on breaking up the couple.

== Production history ==
My Big Gay Italian Wedding premiered at the Actor's Playhouse on November 14, 2003, where it played in repertory with the musical Naked Boys Singing. Wedding was directed by Peter Rapanaro, and featured a costume design by Chris March of Bravo's reality television series Project Runway. In March 2004, the production moved to what was then Theatre Four on West 55th Street in Manhattan and played for 38 weeks, with a new cast that included James Getzlaff, star of the Bravo reality series Boy Meets Boy.

On September 12, 2009, a revised and updated version of the play played a benefit performance at the St. George Theatre in Staten Island; the new production was produced by Dina Manzo of The Real Housewives of New Jersey and starred Wilkinson and Scott Evans of the ABC soap opera One Life to Live. It was directed by Sonia Blangiardo and Teresa A. Cicala and included new choreography by J. Austin Eyer.

The production moved to an open-ended run at the St. Luke's Theatre in Manhattan in May 2010, adding as co-star Reichen Lehmkuhl of CBS TV's The Amazing Race. In July 2010, Daniel Robinson, veteran of Broadway Bares, Hairspray and the film The Big Gay Musical (2009) joined Wilkinson on stage until November 2010. On August 2, 2010, it was announced that Real Housewives of New Jersey cast members Teresa Giudice, Ashley Holmes, Jacqueline Laurita, Caroline Manzo, and Lauren Manzo would step in as cast members for one week in September. After sold-out performances, the Housewives signed up to repeat their guest appearances on October 20 to 23rd, 2010 resulting in another successful, sold-out run. Dr. Joy Browne joined the cast for three performances, September 30 to October 2, 2010.

Following Robinson's departure, the role of Andrew was taken up by David Moretti, star of here! TV's series The Lair, on November 18, 2010, the same day as the show's 100th performance. The show rang in this milestone performance with special guests Ilene Kristen from One Life to Live and Claire Buffie, the reigning 2010 Miss New York, whose platform is marriage equality. BRAVO's Tabatha Coffey was a special guest in the show for a full weekend, December 2-4th 2010. Other guests during this period included Lance Bass and Vincent Pastore.

In January 2011, Marty Thomas joined the cast as Andrew, replacing David Moretti. Ilene Kristen, previously a special guest in the show, also joined the cast as Aunt Toniann. This provided the set up for MBGIW's first soap week, March 17–19, 2011, when soap opera divas took over all the female roles in the play for the weekend, and Kristen was joined onstage by Ellen Dolan (As the World Turns), Brittany Underwood (One Life to Live), Kristen Alderson (One Life to Live), and Marnie Schulenberg] (As the World Turns). On March 31, 2011 recording artist Kim Sozzi took over duties as Aunt Toniann for Ilene Kristen. Sozzi occupied the role until May 28, 2011. In something new for the role, Sozzi, as Aunt Toniann, performed the original song "Italian Booty Shake" live during the wedding reception in Act II of the play. In May 2011, My Big Gay Italian Wedding celebrated one full year Off-Broadway at St. Luke's Theatre. In June 2011, the show celebrated Gay Pride Month by alternating drag queens in the role of Rodney each week. The drag queens included Hedda Lettuce and RuPaul's Drag Race contestants Mimi Imfurst and Stacy Layne Matthews. In August 2011, My Big Gay Italian Wedding made its European debut playing at The Edinburgh Festival Fringe. The production was directed by Paul Taylor-Mills and transferred to The White Bear in London following its Edinburgh run. In September 2012, the play made its Asian debut in Hong Kong, directed by Wendy Herbert at The Hong Kong Fringe Club.

In May 2018, a Los Angeles run was announced at the Actor's Company from May 11 to May 27, presented by Italia Spettacolo in collaboration with the Italian Institute of Culture Los Angeles, with actor Gianfranco Terrin in the role of Anthony Pinnunziato".

== Cast ==
The original cast included Anthony J. Wilkinson (Anthony), Bill Fisher (Andrew), Joe Scanio (Joseph), Meredith Cullen (Maria), Maria Nazzaro (Carmela), JC Alvarez (Father Rosalia), Nick Scarnati (Mario), and Vincent Briguccia (Gregorio).

== Cast recording ==
In July 2010, a recording featuring Boyd's original songs was made available on iTunes. In March 2011, Marty Thomas, along with David J. Boyd, recorded an updated version of the original track "Love Conquers All", which thereafter was featured and sung by Marty in the show during curtain calls.

== Hairstyle contest ==
Tabatha Coffey returned to My Big Gay Italian Wedding March 3–5, 2011 as a special guest in the show, similar to her run in December. Her appearance coincided with My Big Gay Italian Wedding's "The Higher the Hair, the Closer to God" hair salon contest, in which Coffey was one of the judges for the semifinals alongside Dina Manzo and Elvis Duran of Z100. Open to all salon owners and employees in the greater New York area, the contest challenged contestants to create "to create an innovative, modern, high, big, trendy hair style/theme" to be used in My Big Gay Italian Wedding. Winner Michael Mortensen from Visage Hair Studio, Grant City, received a $5,000 grand prize and a walk-on role in the play.

== Sequels ==
Wilkinson wrote three sequel plays, My Big Gay Italian Funeral and My Big Gay Italian Midlife Crisis and “My Big Gay Italian Christmas”.

== Film adaptation ==
An Italian film based on the play, called Puoi baciare lo sposo (You can kiss the groom), premiered in Italy on March 1, 2018. Distributed as My Big Gay Italian Wedding in the United States, the film was directed by Alessandro Genovesi and stars Salvatore Esposito and Cristiano Caccamo as fiancés Paolo and Antonio, and Diego Abatantuono and Monica Guerritore as Roberto and Anna, Antonio's parents.
