= The Real Housewives of New Jersey season 5 =

The Real Housewives of New Jersey
- Season 5
- Cover used by the iTunes Store (Left to right) Laurita, Giudice, Manzo, Gorga, and Wakile
- Starring: Teresa Giudice; Jacqueline Laurita; Caroline Manzo; Melissa Gorga; Kathy Wakile
- No. of episodes: 22

Release
- Original network: Bravo
- Original release: June 2 – October 20, 2013

Season chronology
- ← Previous; Season 4 Next → Season 6

The fifth season of The Real Housewives of New Jersey, an American reality television series, was broadcast on Bravo. It aired from June 2, 2013, until October 20, 2013, and was primarily filmed in Franklin Lakes, New Jersey. Its executive producers are Rebecca Toth Diefenbach, Valerie Haselton, Lucilla D'Agostino, Jim Fraenkel, Omid Kahangi, Caroline Self, Tess Gamboa Meyers and Andy Cohen.

The Real Housewives of New Jersey focuses on the lives of Teresa Giudice, Jacqueline Laurita, Caroline Manzo, Melissa Gorga and Kathy Wakile. It consisted of twenty-two episodes.

This season marked the final appearance of Caroline Manzo and the final regular appearance of Kathy Wakile. It also marked the first departure of Jacqueline Laurita. She eventually returned for the show’s 7th season.

== Production and crew ==
The Real Housewives of New Jersey was officially renewed for a fifth season on April 2, 2013.

The season premiere "Garden State of Emergency" was aired on June 2, 2013, while the twentieth episode "Salon, Farewell" served as the season finale, and was aired on September 29, 2013. It was followed by a two-part reunion that aired on October 6, and October 13, 2013. A two-part episode "The Real Housewives Tell All" marked the conclusion of the season and was broadcast on October 14, and October 20, 2013.

Rebecca Toth Diefenbach, Valerie Haselton, Lucilla D'Agostino, Jim Fraenkel, Omid Kahangi, Caroline Self, Tess Gamboa Meyers and Andy Cohen are recognized as the series' executive producers; it is produced and distributed by Sirens Media.

== Cast and synopsis ==
The fifth season saw no regular cast changes made at the beginning of the series and all the wives returning. Kim DePaola returned in a recurring capacity.

The season continued with the family drama between Teresa Giudice and her family and fellow cast member Melissa Gorga and Kathy Wakile. Instead of fighting, majority of the cast aimed to mending their fractured relationships and leaving the drama behind. Throughout the seasons the wives' loyalty is put to the test as rumors circle around New Jersey and they question who is the catalyst of the gossip. By the end of the season many of the ladies have made tough decisions on whether to move forward with their friendships or leave them behind.

== Episodes ==
The Real Housewives of New Jersey season 5 episodes
No. overall	No. in season	Title	Original release date	U.S. viewers (millions)
74	1	"Garden State of Emergency"	June 2, 2013	2.84
In the Season 5 premiere, the housewives come together after Hurricane Sandy hits the east coast. Jacqueline receives news regarding her son's diagnosis of autism. Caroline's offer to Joe Gorga could start tension between the ladies.
75	2	"A Manzo of Her Word"	June 9, 2013	2.45
Teresa explains to her daughters that their grandpa will be receiving a pacemaker. Melissa and Joe question their realtor as to why their home isn't selling as quickly as expected. Later they hold an open house, where Jennifer Dalton is introduced into the series. Caroline explains how her home is always open to those who are in need, with her newest guest being her sister Fran. Kathy and Rich take Joseph, now 17, out to practice his driving skills. Kathy feels that Joseph is picking up too much of Rich's personality, and jokes that Rich is living vicariously through their son. Jacqueline heads to New York City to partake in an interview with Parenting magazine regarding autism awareness. Teresa is with Kim D when she receives the texts from Caroline stating that she wishes to meet with her to discuss the ongoing family issues. Kathy and Rich visit their daughter, Victoria, while she is in school and Victoria shows them the college campus. Jacqueline and Chris host a poker night. Chris reveals to Jacqueline that their son is able to say "I love you" again. At Caroline and Teresa's sit-down, Teresa agrees to meet Caroline halfway and for Caroline to tell her brother that she is willing to take him back with open arms — as long as both of them work to make it happen.
76	3	"It's My Party and I'll Fight if I Want To"	June 16, 2013	2.11
Caroline returns to her home for the first time after Hurricane Sandy while Teresa rushes to the hospital after her father is admitted to the Intensive Care Unit.
77	4	"Gym Rats"	June 23, 2013	2.41
Melissa's past comes back to haunt her. Kathy hosts a birthday celebration for her daughter and husband. Teresa becomes emotional after she runs into her brother while out.
78	5	"Everything Is Coming Up Rosie"	June 30, 2013	2.19
Jacqueline meets with the doctor to discuss her son's medical issues. Melissa and Joe fight over rumors Teresa has been saying. Caroline feels that her children are becoming too much like their father. Teresa and her cousin Rosie clash.
79	6	"Drinking With the Enemy"	July 7, 2013	2.17
Teresa and Rosie try to bring the family together for a healing retreat. Teresa and Jacqueline clash for the first time since the Season 4 finale. Rumors about Melissa begin to make their way around, thanks to Kim D.
80	7	"When Joes Collide"	July 14, 2013	2.70
The ladies prepare for their trip to Lake George. Teresa goes on the trip with the mentality of confronting Jacqueline. Melissa begins to dwindle down Teresa's never-ending lies. Kathy is left to stand on the side and watch while it all goes down.
81	8	"Scum One, Scum All"	July 21, 2013	2.83
After Joe Gorga calls his sister scum, Teresa walks out and informs her husband what her brother called her. Joe Giudice demands that Joe Gorga apologizes to Teresa and Joe Gorga attacks him. Melissa tries to stop the fight and asks Teresa for help but Teresa runs out of the building because it is too much for her to handle. Kathy does not want to get involved since she recently got her nose reconstructed. Joe Gorga tries to push Joe Giudice away by biting on his testicles. Rosie and Rich come to separate the Joes, thus ending the fight, which has left everyone dazed, confused and all covered in mysterious black stains which turn out to be from Joe Gorga's black hair dye. After the fight everyone returns to their rooms. Melissa says that she's done with the Giudices. Rosie and the Wakiles talk about what just happened, and Rich puts the blame on Teresa for the fight. Rich comes to the Giudices' room and challenges Teresa to go and hug her brother in order to make amends. Teresa gets up and goes to Joe Gorga’s room but he refuses to speak with her. Teresa, desperate to save her relationship with her brother, calls Caroline for help and Caroline agrees to drive to the castle. Caroline acknowledges she decided to go since Teresa never asks for help and acknowledges if Teresa called her for help, she knows things are very bad. Dr. V from LA Shrinks arrives and sits down with the whole family while trying to have them all talk their issues out with each other. Melissa continues to blame Teresa for everything, then Dr. V decides to have a one-on-one talk with Joe Gorga. Joe tells Dr. V how much he hates his sister and that he's done with her. Dr. V then calls Teresa over and they all talk about their family issues. Caroline then arrives, to everyone's surprise, and reveals that Teresa called her for help. Back in therapy, Teresa discusses how she misses the old times when she used to hang out with her brother without their spouses. Joe seems apprehensive at first and then reaches to his sister and hugs her, causing them to cry together.
82	9	"On Thin Guid-Ice"	July 28, 2013	2.48
The reconciliation between Joe and Teresa continues, thanks to Dr. V, with more talking and negotiation. Melissa is summoned, and she tells Teresa exactly why she feels so betrayed; even if Teresa doesn’t directly say terrible things about her sister-in-law, she is always conveniently in the room when they’re being said. If she truly cared about Melissa and didn’t wish her ill, she would speak up and defend her. Dr. V backs this up and calls Teresa a dumbass. Teresa shuts up and agrees. She apologizes and hugs it out with Melissa. They agree to work on being civil with each other, and meeting halfway to keep their relationship strong. Dr. V then summons Joe Giudice in for his counseling. The two Joes speak and determine that they don’t hate each other. Joe Giudice just says that he doesn’t like seeing anyone attack his wife, and it makes him defensive in return. He apologizes to Melissa as well. Kathy is miffed when she sees Dr. V leaving the hotel because she didn’t get any therapy time. Kathy gently confronts Teresa about their own little feud, which came about during the last reunion . In another crazy miracle, Teresa apologizes to Kathy, and the pair make up. Everyone in the entire Gorga-Giudice family is currently made up and on good speaking terms. Even Caroline can’t believe it. She calls Jacqueline and relays her the story, but Jacqueline can't care less. The men and Rosie go ice fishing, while the ladies stay behind and make a feast. Melissa gets drunk while cooking, and the rest of the family soon follows. Caroline decides to bring up Jacqueline and Chris at dinner. She wants Teresa to make amends with the Lauritas. They decide to move things to the hotel parlor, where they do trust fall exercises. Melissa manages to catch Joe Giudice, even in her stilettos. When Teresa tries to have fun and catch Caroline, she only agrees to do a trust fall if Teresa agrees to make up with Jacqueline. Joe Giudice sits Teresa down and tells her that he agrees. He misses hanging out with Chris, and he thinks they should all forgive and forget.
83	10	"Best Frenemies Forever"	August 4, 2013	2.57
Melissa goes to visit Joe with their sons at one of his construction sites, when he gives her some good news – Sizzle Tans wants the couple to appear on a series of billboards for the company. Since Teresa was the star of a Sizzle Tans commercial several years ago, Melissa declines the offer so she won’t have something to fight about with her sister-in-law, and lets Joe star in the ad by himself. Teresa and her daughters are preparing food for a Sunday dinner with Joe and Melissa’s family. The two families used to have dinner every weekend, so this is the first step in resuming their old relationship. After leaving the construction site, Melissa heads over the Jacqueline’s house with Caroline to fill her in on all the details from the retreat. They mention the part where Caroline talked Teresa into making up with Jacqueline. Jacqueline is a little wary of attempting to make up with her so fast. She doesn’t even know if she wants to meet with her but Caroline persists and says to give her a chance when she reaches out. At Sunday Dinner, things are still a little tense between Melissa and Teresa. Joe Gorga expresses his desire to reconnect with Gia, his goddaughter, who he hasn’t been keeping in touch with during the feud. And Melissa lets Teresa know that she talked to Jacqueline. Kathy sits Rosie down for a heart-to-heart and lets her know that they’re never going to get in a fight like Teresa and Joe. Later, Kathy goes to a lesbian bar with her sister, Richie, Melissa and Joe to troll for eligible ladies. Rosie is overall disappointed with the selection at the bar, but has fun flirting anyway. Caroline and Al invite their kids over for dinner at their Hoboken apartment. When one of their sons expresses how exhausted he is with his heavy workload, Caroline launches into a tirade about how he shouldn’t always put work first and that he needs to slow down. Al snaps as she’s saying this, telling her to stop meddling in her kids’ lives and to "shut the eff up." The next day, Albie expresses some concern about his parents’ marriage to Caroline after seeing this happen. While Joe has his photo-shoot for Sizzle Tans, Melissa shoots the cover for her marriage handbook. Joe hams it up in the tanning salon, rocking a bandana and doing pushups with a bikini model on his back. When Teresa and Joe meet with Chris and Jacqueline, the men and women separate to have their own conversations, which go very differently. Teresa somehow blames Jacqueline for her terrible relationship with her brother. She’s also upset about some comments Jacqueline made at the last reunion about Joe cheating on her.
84	11	"Children of the Scorned"	August 11, 2013	2.41
Last week’s discussion between Jacqueline and Teresa wraps up as the ladies get to root cause of the problem: their incessant need to tweet every time they’re upset with each other instead of confronting their problems directly. They agree to get over it and move forward in their relationship in a new way. They’ll be civil – and maybe one day, they’ll be friends again. Jacqueline and Kathy go to a lingerie store later on to discuss her reconciliation with Teresa, and Jacqueline reveals that she’s heading to Beverly Hills soon to get a tummy tuck and her neck done so she can feel more confident about her body. Plus, she can spend some time with Ashlee, who lives in Los Angeles. Since Joe Gorga feuded with Teresa for so long, he missed out on a lot of valuable bonding time with goddaughter Gia, and now he wants to make up for the lost memories. Naturally, they’re going to mend their broken relationship by go-karting it out. Gia is 12 now and a typical moody preteen, so she pretends to hate it, but you can tell that she’s having a good time with her uncle. Joe realizes that sometimes his crazy reactions to his sister’s words affect the children, and not just the adults. He makes a vow to always look out for his nieces, no matter what’s going on with Teresa. Teresa has invited all of her family and Jacqueline’s family to a massive Zumba fundraiser somewhere far enough away that they have to take a party bus to get there. It’s a great cause – raising money for a little boy with a chronic illness – but most of the event is spent focusing on Teresa and Jacqueline’s newly minted friendship. Chris and Albie’s best friend/roommate Greg is moving away for a new job in San Francisco, and the boys throw him a big going away dinner with all his best friends. Caroline alarms everyone present by sobbing as she says her goodbyes and presents Greg with a gift. It’s a framed photo of some graffiti that he spotted when moving into his apartment with the Manzo boys that says: "take care of each other." Jacqueline finally makes it out to Beverly Hills toward the end of the episode, where she reunites with her daughter. Ashlee is a blogger now, who pays her own bills and manages to take care of herself without much trouble. Ashlee’s concerned about her mother getting such serious surgery done, when she really doesn’t need it. Jacqueline’s parents are also in town from Las Vegas for support.
85	12	"Hair-Binger of Doom"	August 18, 2013	2.29
An article about Melissa's marriage is the talk throughout New Jersey and Teresa's hair product launch puts Melissa face to face with a former friend. As Jacqueline celebrates her return from Los Angeles with her new look, an encounter with Caroline leaves Kathy questioning her partnership with Rich.
86	13	"Spaghetti Western & Meatballs"	August 25, 2013	2.38
Rosie, the Giudices, Gorgas, Lauritas, Wakiles and Manzos go on a spa retreat in Arizona to celebrate Melissa's birthday. A psychic reveals emotional aspects of Kathy and Richie Wakile's relationships with their fathers. Melissa gets too sick to be involved in activities while the rest of the group goes on a healing journey. Teresa and Jacqueline talk, and Teresa hints that Nick's autism is caused by negative karma caused by Jacqueline's misdeeds.
87	14	"Horse Whisper to a Scream"	September 1, 2013	1.82
Still in Arizona, the entire group pay a visit to the Purple Sage Ranch to meet Wyatt Webb, an Equine therapist. The task they must carry out with a horse allows some of the group to open up about their fears. Rosie tearfully reveals how she has never felt good enough, Al Manzo confesses he was emotionally abused during his childhood and Kathy and Richie address their marital problems. Melissa and Teresa, however, aren't able to grasp the concept of the therapy and are unable to truly open up. The entire group is shocked when Joe Giudice reveals his fears about going to prison. Later, Jacqueline and Teresa continue to work through their issues as Jacqueline questions Teresa's previous comments about linking bad karma to Nick's autism.
88	15	"Zen Things I Hate About You"	September 8, 2013	2.25
On the last night of their Tucson, Arizona trip, the group is drinking together. Jacqueline states that she hopes her and Teresa can put the past behind them and start off fresh. Caroline notes that the group has agreed to put everything behind them once before but it never worked out so she asks everyone if they have any words they would like to say before they move on. Joe brings up Penny's accusations of Melissa cheating on him, with Teresa saying that she has no part in the gossip. Joe ends up angry and throws his glass of champagne. The next morning, it is Melissa's birthday. Joe and Melissa are playing in bed when Teresa walks in to give Melissa her birthday coffee and gift. Kathy, Rich and Rosie are on a hike while discussing what occurred during the horse exercise. Kathy exclaims that she feels no one thinks she can stick up for herself due to Rosie always jumping in. Caroline and Al sit by the hot tub to also discuss what happened with Wyatt Webb, the Equine therapist. Al wishes he could have gone into detail about the "abusive past" he endured but would rather have not had the rest of the group there. Chris, Rich, Joe Giudice and Joe Gorga spend some time by the pool, drinking and up to their usual antics — scaring everyone else away in the process. The ladies play a game of therapeutic tennis while the guys are at the pool. Later, the group meets up to partake in another exercise that is supposed to bring the group closer together. Due to the heights, Caroline chooses to sit this one out. At the end of the day, each couple freshens up then comes together again for dinner to celebrate Melissa's birthday. Melissa says her birthday wish is that all the rumors/tweets/gossip about her would stop. After dinner, Rosie feels that the group is being too mellow and they should party on their last night in Arizona. The scene after is the events that lead up to the beginning scene, Joe Gorga is once again seen throwing his glass of champagne then storming off. Caroline tries to show Teresa how much pain her brother is in but Teresa continues to say she has nothing to do with the Penny situation. Kathy brings up that the exercise they did today was about trust, and that Teresa, Joe, and Melissa need to come together and tell everyone to stop spreading lies by becoming united.
89	16	"The Blonde Drops a Bombshell"	September 15, 2013	2.40
Jacqueline decides that she needs to become more active in the autism awareness movement, but dislikes the fact that her motives are questioned every time she tries to do something charitable. Chris also wonders why people can't accept the fact that they want to do something positive. Melissa, Teresa, and their husbands enjoy lunch with Mama Gorga in the hopes of proving the family is working towards reconciliation. Teresa is willing to assist Jacqueline in creating a speech for an upcoming event. Melissa and Joe meet with a music producer because Melissa would like to release new music. Kathy is busy selling her cannolis, and has a huge business opportunity heading her way. Melissa, Teresa, Jacqueline, and their families show up in support. Caroline is unable to attend due to a migraine. Jacqueline has a difficult time speaking at the event out of fear that she will be judged. Despite this, she prevails. Melissa and Joe dine out to talk about Melissa's music career when they notice that Penny, the woman who has been involved with the cheating rumors, is in the same restaurant as them. When they confront Penny, she refuses to apologize for Teresa's actions.
90	17	"Hair We Go Again"	September 22, 2013	2.47
91	18	"Salon, Farewell"	September 29, 2013	2.50
92	19	"Reunion: Part 1"	October 6, 2013	2.49
93	20	"Reunion: Part 2"	October 13, 2013	2.09
94	21	"The Real Housewives Tell All — Part 1"	October 14, 2013	0.94
95	22	"The Real Housewives Tell All — Part 2"	October 20, 2013	1.50
