= Nicole Napolitano =

American television personality

Nicole Napolitano Mauriello
- Born: Nicole Napolitano; September 5, 1969 (age 56); Brooklyn, New York City, New York, U.S.
- Occupations: Entrepreneur, television personality
- Years active: 2014–present
- Known for: The Real Housewives of New Jersey
- Spouse(s): Joseph Mauriello (divorced)
- Children: 2

Nicole Napolitano Mauriello (born 1969) is an American television personality and entrepreneur. She is best known for starring in the reality television series The Real Housewives of New Jersey. She is the twin sister of Teresa Aprea.

== Career ==
Napolitano's boyfriend Bobby brought the twins to the attention of the Bravo network as potential cast members on Real Housewives. Mauriello and her sister appeared on the sixth season of Bravo's The Real Housewives of New Jersey in 2014, as additions to the cast together with Amber Marchese; the three new cast members took over from Caroline Manzo, Kathy Wakile and Jacqueline Laurita, who left the show. She left the series after one season, though continued to appear as a guest in Season 7. Napolitano's relationship with her boyfriend was a major element of the show, though in November 2014, Napolitano's boyfriend Bobby Ciasulli posted an hour-long video providing his side of story regarding conflicts that had taken place on the screen and behind the scenes.

Press reports indicated that Napolitano and Aprea were dropped because their Central Jersey home base made it more challenging to integrate them into the action among the bulk of the core cast members an hour away in North Jersey.

== Personal life ==
Napolitano and her twin sister Teresa Aprea were born in the New York City borough of Brooklyn. Parents Salvatore and Santa Napolitano both appeared on the show together with their daughters. She attended St. John's University in New York City and the American University of Rome.

Napolitano lives in Colts Neck Township, New Jersey. Divorced from former-husband Joseph Mauriello, she has raised their children Anthony and Joey.

Napolitano ran a home-based personal development business she ran while raising her children and operates a private jet charter business. She also owns a Dairy Queen franchise.

Since leaving RHONJ, the two sisters hosted a podcast called Girls in Heels.
