= The Real Housewives of New Jersey season 1 =

Season of television series

The Real Housewives of New Jersey
- Season 1
- Cover used by the iTunes Store (Left to right) Laurita, Giudice, Staub, Dina, and Caroline Manzo
- Starring: Dina Manzo; Teresa Giudice; Jacqueline Laurita; Caroline Manzo; Danielle Staub
- No. of episodes: 10

Release
- Original network: Bravo
- Original release: May 12 – July 9, 2009

Season chronology
- Next → Season 2

The first season of The Real Housewives of New Jersey, an American reality television series, was broadcast on Bravo. It aired from May 12, 2009 until July 9, 2009, and was primarily filmed in Franklin Lakes, New Jersey. Its executive producers are Rebecca Toth Diefenbach, Valerie Haselton, Lucilla D'Agostino, Jim Fraenkel, Omid Kahangi, Caroline Self, Tess Gamboa Meyers and Andy Cohen.

The Real Housewives of New Jersey focuses on the lives of Dina Manzo, Teresa Giudice, Jacqueline Laurita, Caroline Manzo and Danielle Staub. It consisted of eight episodes, all of which aired on Tuesday evenings.

== Production and crew ==
The Real Housewives of New Jersey was first announced when Bravo released its 2008–09 programming on April 15, 2008. It was later announced that the series would debut on May 12, 2009, the first series to feature family members. Dina and Tommy Manzo would later end up separated. The season premiere "Thicker Than Water" was aired on May 12, 2009, while the seventh episode "The Last Supper" served as the season finale, and was aired on June 18, 2009. It was followed by a two-part reunion special, and a lost footage episode which marked the conclusion of the season and was broadcast on November July 9, 2009. Rebecca Toth Diefenbach, Valerie Haselton, Lucilla D'Agostino, Jim Fraenkel, Omid Kahangi, Caroline Self, Tess Gamboa Meyers and Andy Cohen are recognized as the series' executive producers; it is produced and distributed by Sirens Media.

== Cast and synopsis ==
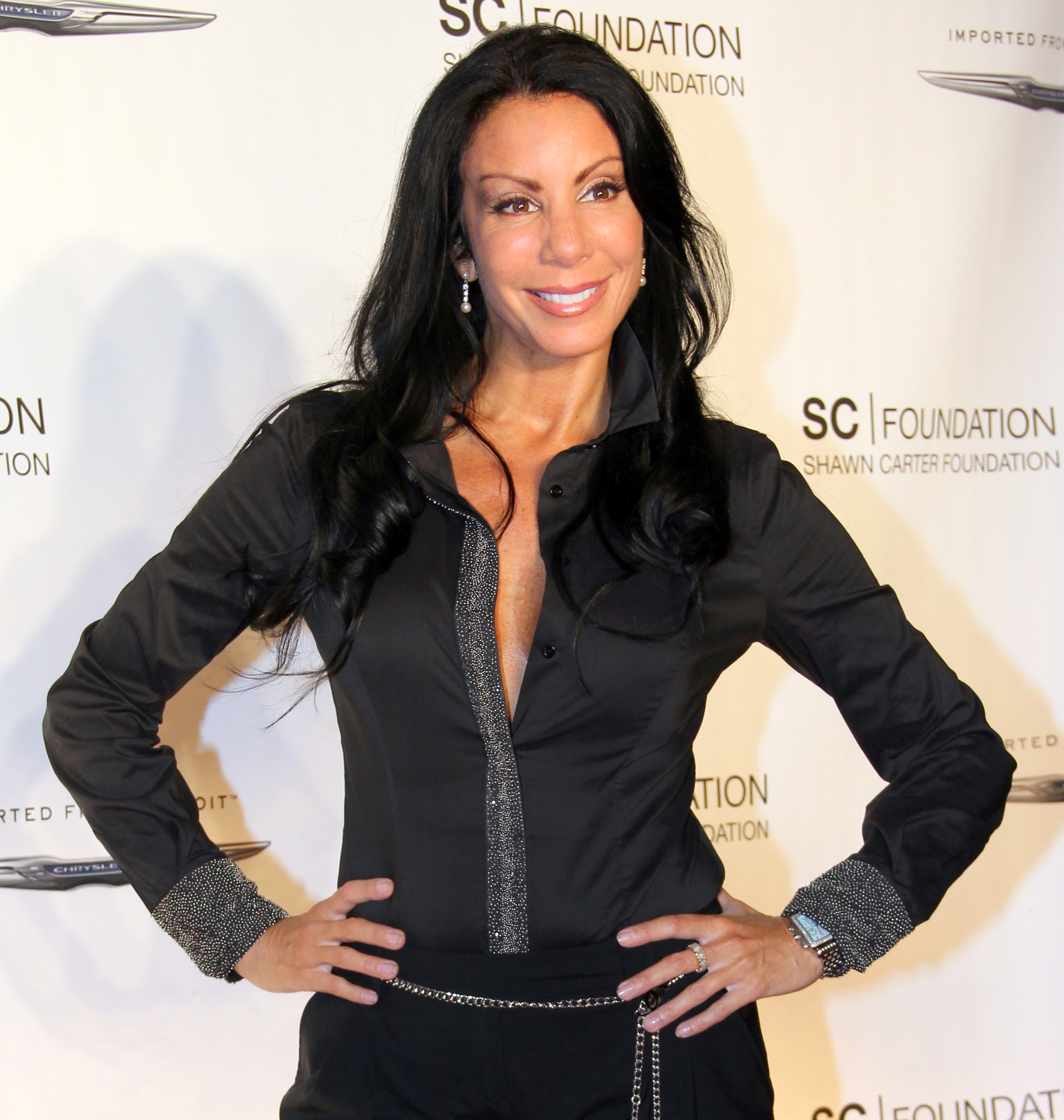
Danielle Staub appears in a main role.

Five housewives were featured during the first season of The Real Housewives of New Jersey, which Bravo described as "the most affluent and drama-filled women in the Garden State." The series was the first Real Housewives installment to feature family, sisters Caroline and Dina are married to brothers Albert and Tommy Manzo, and Jacqueline Laurita is married to Caroline and Dina's brother, Chris Laurita. Fellow series regular Teresa Giudice had been friends with both Manzos and Laurita for years prior to the series and Danielle Staub, who was also a series regular, was introduced to the group through Jacqueline.

== Episodes ==
The Real Housewives of New Jersey season 1 episodes
| No. overall | No. in season | Title | Original release date | U.S. viewers (millions) |
|---|---|---|---|---|
| 1 | 1 | "Thicker Than Water" | May 12, 2009 | 1.72 |
In the first episode, we meet the Housewives: Teresa, a shopaholic married to contractor Joe, who is making arrangements to move into her multi-million dollar dream home. Dina, an interior designer and event planner who rebuilt her life in New Jersey after her divorce from her first husband. Caroline, who is Dina's older sister and has a hand in helping run her husband's successful catering business, The Brownstone. Jacqueline, a Las Vegas native who is a caring do-gooder and married to Caroline and Dina's brother. Danielle, a single mom and former model whose ex-husband was the twentieth man she was engaged to. Caroline's son Albie is the only one going to college, but her son Christopher has plans to start a strip club/wash, which Caroline and Dina both find funny and mortifying. Jacqueline met Danielle at the salon and became best friends with her, and is nervous about integrating her into the group. Dina has a charity, Project Ladybug, which aids ailing children with cancer, and she hires an assistant. Dina throws a benefit for her charity and loses her cool, firing Jacqueline's daughter Ashley as a worker at the event. This news upsets Jacqueline and Teresa. Danielle decides to go on a blind date with a man she met on the Internet.
| 2 | 2 | "Mamas Knows Best" | May 19, 2009 | 1.49 |
Teresa takes her daughter Gia to a talent representative, who isn't impressed with her overly done photos but is impressed with the natural youthful look she has in person. Dina designs a dressing room for an anonymous "mega-celebrity," and has second thoughts about her career path. Jacqueline learns from Ashley's high school that she failed two classes and as a result, failed her junior year. Jacqueline has no choice but to send Ashley to summer school and take away her car. Having snagged her 26-year-old blind date as her boyfriend, Danielle maintains her physique by going rock-climbing. Caroline's daughter Lauren decides to pursue cosmetology as a career. Teresa has Gia's portfolio redone without makeup on Gia's face. With her new photos, the talent representative approves of Gia. Danielle throws a salon/Botox party for the other women. Danielle becomes offended when Dina politely declines the Botox because Danielle says Dina once admitted she has work done on her face. When Dina makes one bitchy comment too far, Danielle feels no need to befriend Dina for Jacqueline's sake and when Danielle plans her birthday with Jacqueline, Danielle won't invite Dina. Jacqueline announces to Caroline that her husband Chris felt so bad about Ashley's low self-esteem that he buys her a car, which Caroline vehemently disapproves of, since Ashley just failed school. Tension grows at a triple-date Danielle and her boyfriend has with Teresa and Jacqueline and their husbands, and Danielle confesses to the girls that she wants to end it with him. Later on, Danielle calls a summit with Jacqueline and Teresa about her love crisis, which upsets both ladies when it becomes clear Danielle doesn't want advice, she just wants them to agree with her. Jacqueline and Teresa discuss "rumors floating around town" that Danielle is a husband-stealer and a stripper.
| 3 | 3 | "Not One of Us" | May 26, 2009 | 1.69 |
Caroline vows to investigate Danielle, especially if she's coming into the lives of the people she loves.
| 4 | 4 | "Black & White and Read All Over" | June 2, 2009 | N/A |
Danielle calls a dinner date with Jacqueline and Teresa about the comments Dina made toward her at the Botox party. When Jacqueline tries to respond, Danielle becomes very agitated. Dina insists she doesn't care that much about Danielle. Teresa notes that Danielle attaches herself to her friends very quickly and that makes her hesitant. Dina helps her daughter Lexi pack for her first vacation away, which makes her very sad. Teresa tells Jacqueline that she and her husband want to take salsa and merengue lessons; she invites the rest of the girls and their families. Danielle dances "too sexy" with Caroline's son Albie, which immediately offends Caroline. Danielle starts an argument with Teresa's husband Joe after he uses the word "gaylord" in conversation; when she says "don't tell me to be quiet, I'm not your wife" with Teresa in earshot, she decides she is done with Danielle. At Lexi's going-away party, Caroline, Dina, Teresa and family discuss Danielle and they all conclude that they're "a little afraid" of her. Jacqueline and Chris meet with the fertility specialist since Jacqueline has had four miscarriages. The fertility specialist rules out abnormalities and suggests her miscarriages may be due to her pushing 40. Danielle questions who her real friends are; when Danielle calls Teresa to apologize, Teresa hangs up on her, and Danielle is convinced that Dina "got to" Teresa. Dina calls a summit with Caroline and Teresa to discuss Danielle. Caroline notes that her "investigation" hadn't even gotten underway when her niece found a book called Cop Without a Badge, which Caroline and Dina read. Teresa informs the audience that Danielle had a colorful past which involved kidnapping, dealing with the Colombian cartel, and being a prostitute, which only underscore the bad feelings the women have for Danielle. Danielle finds out that Dina and Caroline know about the book, causing her to call a meeting with Jacqueline. Danielle cops to some of the truth revealed in the book, but not all of it, which has Jacqueline confused as to what to believe. Jacqueline notices subtle shunning on Dina's part, pressuring her to break off her friendship. Teresa is finishing the renovations on her mansion. Teresa's husband has some words for Danielle at a gala event.
| 5 | 5 | "Casinos and C-Cups" | June 9, 2009 | N/A |
Caroline, Dina and Teresa go to Atlantic City, but not Jacqueline. Jacqueline, sensing she is not welcome as she has not cut ties with Danielle yet, takes the opportunity to spend time at home with her daughter Ashley, who is improving her grades at summer school. However, when the teenager acts ungrateful and bratty at a photo shoot Jacqueline scheduled to expand her portfolio, Jacqueline feels less than motherly and decides to withhold the car that she secretly bought for Ashley. Teresa then learns that Danielle's boyfriend is taking someone else to her beach house. Danielle finds herself with no allies after she breaks up with her shady boyfriend, and Danielle's birthday ends with an argument with Jacqueline. Teresa, after getting feedback from her friends and family and taking into account her own bodily insecurities, decides to go ahead with breast implant surgery.
| 6 | 6 | "Finale" | June 16, 2009 | 3.47 |
Teresa invites The Manzos, The Lauritas, and The Staubs to join them for a dinner party. Tensions rise when Danielle places the infamous book Cop Without A Badge on the table to confront allegations and rumors. This suddenly turns into an argument between the women and concludes with the infamous table flip by Teresa.
| 7 | 7 | "The Last Supper" | June 18, 2009 | 1.13 |
The directors' cut of what wasn't shown on the Final Dinner.
| 8 | 8 | "Watch What Happens Reunion: Part One" | June 23, 2009 | 2.89 |
In the beginning, Teresa and Danielle are sitting together on one couch, while the Laurita/Manzo sisters are on the other couch. It is announced that Teresa and Jacqueline are pregnant; Jacqueline is due the following week AND Teresa is due in September 2009. The episode ended in a cliffhanger, with Caroline accusing Danielle of having planned something ominous for Dina.
| 9 | 9 | "Watch What Happens Reunion: Part Two" | June 25, 2009 | N/A |
The housewives were in an uproar about the book, and Caroline confronted Danielle about something she had planned to harm Dina. Exactly what Danielle had allegedly planned was not revealed, and Danielle refused to admit she knows anything about it.
| 10 | 10 | "The Lost Footage" | July 9, 2009 | N/A |
Extended footage of favorite fights, funny moments, and additional insights into the women's home lives.
