= The Real Housewives of New Jersey season 4 =

Season of television series

The Real Housewives of New Jersey
- Season 4
- Cover used by the iTunes Store (Left to right) Laurita, Gorga, Manzo, Wakile, and Giudice
- Starring: Teresa Giudice; Jacqueline Laurita; Caroline Manzo; Melissa Gorga; Kathy Wakile
- No. of episodes: 24

Release
- Original network: Bravo
- Original release: April 22 – October 21, 2012

Season chronology
- ← Previous; Season 3 Next → Season 5

The fourth season of The Real Housewives of New Jersey, an American reality television series, was broadcast on Bravo. It aired from April 22, 2012 until October 21, 2012, and was primarily filmed in Franklin Lakes, New Jersey. Its executive producers are Rebecca Toth Diefenbach, Valerie Haselton, Lucilla D'Agostino, Jim Fraenkel, Omid Kahangi, Caroline Self, Tess Gamboa Meyers and Andy Cohen.

The Real Housewives of New Jersey focuses on the lives of Teresa Giudice, Jacqueline Laurita, Caroline Manzo, Melissa Gorga and Kathy Wakile. It consisted of twenty-four episodes.

== Production and crew ==
The Real Housewives of New Jersey was officially renewed for a fourth season on June 7, 2011. The season premiere "High Tide, Low Blow"" was aired on April 22, 2012, while the twentieth episode "Strip Down Memory Lane" served as the season finale, and was aired on September 23, 2012. It was followed by a three-part reunion that aired on September 30, October 7 and October 14, 2012, a lost footage episode marked the conclusion of the season and was broadcast on October 21, 2012.

Rebecca Toth Diefenbach, Valerie Haselton, Lucilla D'Agostino, Jim Fraenkel, Omid Kahangi, Caroline Self, Tess Gamboa Meyers and Andy Cohen are recognized as the series' executive producers; it is produced and distributed by Sirens Media.

== Cast and synopsis ==
The fourth season saw no regular cast changes made at the beginning of the series. The season continued with the family drama between Teresa Giudice and her family and fellow cast member Melissa Gorga and Kathy Wakile. Gorga is constantly feeling conflicted as her drama with her sister-in-law puts her husband, Joe Gorga, in a tough position. Caroline Manzo and Jacqueline Laurita also begin to get to know Teresa's family and see their side of things. By the end of the season Giudice is feuding with everyone. Away from the drama of Teresa's family, Melissa pursues her singing career, Caroline celebrates a wedding in the family and Kathy continues to expand her dessert line.

== Episodes ==
The Real Housewives of New Jersey season 4 episodes
No. overall	No. in season	Title	Original release date	U.S. viewers (millions)
50	1	"High Tide, Low Blow"	April 22, 2012	2.95
Melissa and Kathy are still reeling from the hurtful things said in Teresa's cookbook, while Caroline struggles to make peace with Teresa and learns she may be starting menopause. Jacqueline's daughter continues to overstay her welcome at home, which ultimately results in Ashlee's leaving to stay with her aunt and uncle in Las Vegas. Rumors in the tabloids cause the siblings to rehash old wounds and backhanded comments about their spouses.
51	2	"Poker Face"	April 29, 2012	2.24
52	3	"Third Eye Blind"	May 6, 2012	2.54
53	4	"Drowning Pool"	May 13, 2012	2.25
54	5	"Spoiled Sports"	May 20, 2012	2.34
55	6	"Uncivil Union"	June 3, 2012	2.48
56	7	"True Love, True Lies"	June 10, 2012	2.29
57	8	"Best Friends for Never"	June 17, 2012	2.65
58	9	"Public Display of Rejection"	June 24, 2012	2.87
59	10	"Temporary Shrinkage"	July 1, 2012	2.28
60	11	"The Sniff Test"	July 8, 2012	2.51
61	12	"The Jersey Side Step"	July 15, 2012	2.64
62	13	"Sit Down and Man Up"	July 22, 2012	2.34
63	14	"Pack Your Baggage"	July 29, 2012	2.06
64	15	"If This RV is a Rockin'"	August 12, 2012	2.23
65	16	"Whine Country"	August 19, 2012	2.98
66	17	"Hot Tub of Sour Grapes"	August 26, 2012	3.10
67	18	"Dinasty of Denial"	September 9, 2012	2.96
68	19	"A Bald Canary Sings"	September 16, 2012	2.74
The ladies prepare for Kim D's annual Posche fashion show, but a stranger could change their dynamic for good.
69	20	"Strip Down Memory Lane"	September 23, 2012	3.40
In the Season 4 finale, Melissa's past comes to haunt her at the 2011 Posche fashion show, the blame for which is put on Teresa. Jacqueline's absence from the Season 3 reunion is finally explained.
70	21	"Reunion: Part 1"	September 30, 2012	3.49
Teresa must defend herself to all four of the ladies at the reunion. Rosie has a meltdown.
71	22	"Reunion: Part 2"	October 7, 2012	3.59
Joe Giudice puts the cheating rumors to bed. Teresa accuses Melissa of trying to defame her by contacting Danielle.
72	23	"Reunion: Part 3"	October 14, 2012	3.30
Teresa and Joe Gorga have an emotional reunion after not seeing one another for nearly a year. Kim D tries to explain the Posche fashion show setup. Caroline shares a revelation concerning the families' broken relationship.
73	24	"The Lost Footage"	October 21, 2012	1.64
