= The Real Housewives of New Jersey season 3 =

The Real Housewives of New Jersey
- Season 3
- Cover used by the iTunes Store (Left to right) Laurita, Giudice, Manzo, Wakile, and Gorga
- Starring: Teresa Giudice; Jacqueline Laurita; Caroline Manzo; Melissa Gorga; Kathy Wakile
- No. of episodes: 21

Release
- Original network: Bravo
- Original release: May 16 – October 23, 2011

Season chronology
- ← Previous; Season 2 Next → Season 4

The third season of The Real Housewives of New Jersey, an American reality television series, was broadcast on Bravo. It aired from May 16, 2011 until October 23, 2011, and was primarily filmed in Franklin Lakes, New Jersey. Its executive producers are Rebecca Toth Diefenbach, Valerie Haselton, Lucilla D'Agostino, Jim Fraenkel, Omid Kahangi, Caroline Self, Tess Gamboa Meyers and Andy Cohen.

The Real Housewives of New Jersey focuses on the lives of Teresa Giudice, Jacqueline Laurita, Caroline Manzo, Melissa Gorga and Kathy Wakile. It consisted of twenty-one episodes.

== Production and crew ==
The Real Housewives of New Jersey was officially renewed for a third season on August 31, 2010. The season premiere "In the Name of the Father" was aired on May 16, 2011, as a 90 minute special that delivered the highest rated season premiere in the network's history and the highest rated season premiere in The Real Housewives franchise at the time. The nineteenth episode "Portrait of an Italian Family" served as the season finale, and was aired on October 9, 2011. It was followed by a two-part reunion which marked the conclusion of the season and was broadcast on October 16, and October 23, 2011. Laurita didn't attend the season 3 reunion, due to a fight that had happened between her and Giudice days prior to the reunion taping. Season 4 had begun filming while season 3 was airing.

Rebecca Toth Diefenbach, Valerie Haselton, Lucilla D'Agostino, Jim Fraenkel, Omid Kahangi, Caroline Self, Tess Gamboa Meyers and Andy Cohen are recognized as the series' executive producers; it is produced and distributed by Sirens Media.

== Cast and synopsis ==
In the third season, Danielle Staub departed from the series leaving room for Giudice's sister-in-law, Melissa Gorga and cousin, Kathy Wakile to join the cast. The Real Housewives of New Jersey season 3 was the only The Real Housewives series within the franchise that featured a main cast who were all married, until The Real Housewives of Miami also met the criterion starting with its third season.

With Dina Manzo leaving halfway through season 2, it allowed the spotlight of the Manzo family drama to shift to the Giudice-Gorga family history. The season began with a christening for Melissa and Teresa's brother Joey Gorga's son, but things don't go to plan when a sibling spat erupts between Joey and Teresa. The fight continues to snowball throughout the season for all those involved. Jacqueline and Caroline support Teresa throughout the season as she continues to feud with her family. Dolores Catania appeared in a guest role on the cast trip to the Catskill Mountains in upstate New York.

== Episodes ==
The Real Housewives of New Jersey season 3 episodes
No. overall	No. in season	Title	Original release date	U.S. viewers (millions)
29	1	"In the Name of the Father"	May 16, 2011	2.83
Kathy Wakile and Melissa Gorga, Teresa’s first cousin and sister-in-law, respectively, join the cast. Viewers are introduced to quiet and caring mother Kathy and bubbly and sassy Melissa, who plans to throw the best christening Jesus has ever seen for her son Joey. However, drama escalates at the christening when Teresa’s "Congrats" proves too late for the Gorga family’s liking and a brawl erupts when family feuds are revealed. Meanwhile, Jacqueline attempts to deal with two big babies: an angry and upset Teresa and her spoiled teenage daughter Ashley, while Caroline’s surprise visit to her sons’ new apartment turns emotional.
30	2	"Drop Dead Gorgas"	May 23, 2011	2.73
It’s Halloween, and it’s a sight when Joe Gorga dresses up as a girl for the Night of Frights. The Brownstone hosts a fashion show for the ladies’ favorite store, and while Melissa artfully rocks the stage Teresa ceases to strut her stuff. New wounds are opened as Kathy attempts to talk to a belligerent Teresa, who convinces Caroline and Jacqueline to turn their backs on her family.
31	3	"Sealed With a Diss"	May 30, 2011	2.49
Kathy rehashes her spat with Teresa at the fashion show, and decides to make amends with Caroline for having started drama at Caroline’s place. However, the meeting doesn’t go as Kathy expected since Caroline said that she doesn’t want to be involved in any Gorga family drama, and Kathy went away thinking she is viewed as a troublemaker. Teresa goes to the photo shoot for her new cookbook, Fabulicious, and her husband tells her that he saw her brother at the gym. Meanwhile, Melissa’s husband Joe is constantly complaining that she doesn’t have sex with him enough. Jacqueline goes to a tarot card reader, and continues to have problems connecting with her daughter, Ashley. While shopping in New York City with Kim D, Caroline suggests that Teresa write her brother Joe a letter as an olive branch to bring them closer after what happened at the christening. Jacqueline helps Teresa craft the letter, but Teresa has increasing trouble seeing Joe’s side of the argument. Teresa leaves the note on Joe and Melissa’s door since they are out jogging, and after reading the letter, Melissa feels Joe and Teresa should talk, but Joe is still undecided.
32	4	"Gobblefellas"	June 6, 2011	2.47
Thanksgiving is here, and Melissa and Joe buy a turkey at the supermarket. Teresa and Joe go to a live poultry store for their bird, but ultimately opt for an already-dead turkey after feeling sorry for live ones. Caroline, her husband and her daughter drive to the Little Italy deli in Monroe, NY for a "meet the parents" scene at the deli owned by the family of Lauren’s boyfriend, Vito. Meanwhile, Jacqueline’s daughter, Ashley, continues to complain about wanting an apartment in New York City, but does find a sympathetic audience in Caroline’s kids, and decides to drop "the dream" for now. For Thanksgiving, Melissa and Joe have a mechanical bull outside and invite Kathy over (who puts out a huge dessert spread), while Teresa invites Caroline and Jacqueline’s families – however both meals are dominated by Teresa and her brother’s bitter drama. Teresa brings out a card Melissa sent her that says "God Bless you guys in your re-done home!", which has rankled Teresa ever since.
33	5	"Stick It"	June 12, 2011	2.59
34	6	"Whine and Dine"	June 19, 2011	2.53
Caroline takes to the airwaves with her new radio show. Meanwhile, the Gorga siblings attempt to settle their differences, but they invariably stir up more tension, and Jacqueline plays referee in a face-off between Teresa and Melissa.
35	7	"Teresa's Got a Gun"	June 26, 2011	2.03
Teresa, Caroline and Jacqueline head up to the Catskill Mountains for a weekend. Kathy begins exploring the option of opening a restaurant. Melissa and Joe go to Antonia's dance performance.
36	8	"Holidazed and Confused"	July 10, 2011	2.21
37	9	"Twas the Fight Before Christmas"	July 17, 2011	2.53
38	10	"There Arose Such a Clatter"	July 24, 2011	2.92
39	11	"A Very Jersey Christmas"	July 31, 2011	2.83
Christmas day is here. Caroline receives a long-overdue present, and Melissa considers herself Jersey's luckiest woman, but Teresa's holiday isn't turning out to be so jolly.
40	12	"Auld Lang Syne for an Eye"	August 7, 2011	2.32
41	13	"Child's Play No More"	August 14, 2011	2.74
Teresa's and Melissa's children have a play date, while the kids prove to be more mature than their parents. Kathy mulls over how to nurture her daughter, and Ashley's father pays a surprise visit which may come with more than a simple family reunion.
42	14	"Belly Up & Up"	August 21, 2011	2.69
43	15	"Black as Ink"	August 28, 2011	2.38
44	16	"Singing in the Pain"	September 11, 2011	2.67
45	17	"Get to the Punta!"	September 18, 2011	2.88
The ladies travel to Punta Cana. Later, Kathy and Teresa come to blows on the beach.
46	18	"Blood Is Thicker Than Guccis"	October 2, 2011	2.47
47	19	"Portrait of an Italian Family"	October 9, 2011	2.67
In the Season 3 finale, Kathy makes a shocking decision, Jacqueline and an unforeseen visitor work on mending family problems, and drama arises when talk about Teresa's cookbook come into play.
48	20	"Reunion: Part 1"	October 16, 2011	3.44
The ladies reveal that Season 4 is in production, while only somewhat explaining Jacqueline's absence.
49	21	"Reunion: Part 2"	October 23, 2011	3.39
Teresa and Caroline clash. Teresa makes stunning accusations to Melissa.
