= Boys to Manzo =

2011 American reality web TV series

- Genre: Reality television
- Starring: Greg Bennett; Albie Manzo; Chris Manzo
- Country of origin: United States
- Original language: English
- No. of seasons: 1
- No. of episodes: 6

Production
- Executive producers: Rebecca Toth Diefenbach; Valerie Haselton; Lucilla D'Agostino; Jim Fraenkel; Omid Kahangi; Caroline Self; Andy Cohen
- Production company: Sirens Media

Original release
- Network: Bravo
- Release: May 30 – July 10, 2011

Related
- The Real Housewives of New Jersey; Manzo'd with Children

Boys to Manzo is an American reality television web series that aired from May 30 to July 10, 2011, on Bravotv.com, the official website for Bravo. A spin-off to The Real Housewives of New Jersey, the series features Albie and Chris Manzo, the sons of full-time cast member of The Real Housewives of New Jersey Caroline Manzo, living independently away from home with their housemate Gregg Bennett, in Hoboken, New Jersey.

== Development ==
Bravo released the web series titled Boys to Manzo on May 30, 2011, while season three of The Real Housewives of New Jersey was airing. The series stars Albie and Chris Manzo, the sons of full-time cast member of The Real Housewives of New Jersey, Caroline Manzo, along with friend Gregg Bennett The six episode web series depicts the two brothers moving out and seeking independence on their own with their housemate and friend, Greg Bennett, and was primary filmed in their Hoboken apartment. The series consists of 6 episodes.

Several years later, Caroline Manzo received her own spin-off titled Manzo'd with Children, in which her sons also star. The series premiered on October 5, 2014, and has aired a total of three seasons.

== Episodes ==
| No. | Title | Original release date |
|---|---|---|
| 1 | "Apartment Tour" | May 30, 2011 |
Albie, Chris and Gregg give a tour of their apartment, featuring a red carpet and vanity wall.
| 2 | "Man Night" | June 6, 2011 |
Albie bails on man night with Chris and Gregg because he has a date.
| 3 | "Albie's Date Night" | June 12, 2011 |
Albie goes on a date and worries when he brings her back to the apartment.
| 4 | "A Mantervention" | June 19, 2011 |
Albie and Gregg give Chris an intervention on his poor hygiene.
| 5 | "Three Phases of Mantervention" | June 26, 2011 |
Albie and Gregg continue their intervention on Chris's poor hygiene by taunting him out to get new clothes, groomed and a tan.
| 6 | "Bartending Or Science Experiment?" | July 10, 2011 |
After applying for a bartending job to pay the bills, Chris is made fun of after Albie and Gregg pay him a visit.
