= List of Manzo'd with Children episodes =

Manzo'd with Children is an American reality television series on Bravo that debuted on October 5, 2014. It's a spin-off to The Real Housewives of New Jersey. The series features The Real Housewives of New Jersey cast member Caroline Manzo and follows her and her family's journey and endeavors as she spends the majority of her time managing the household.

During the course of the series, 30 episodes of Manzo'd with Children aired over three seasons.

== Series overview ==
| Season | Episodes | Originally released | |
| Season | Episodes | First released | Last released |
|---|---|---|---|
| 1 | 8 | October 5, 2014 | December 7, 2014 |
| 2 | 12 | August 16, 2015 | October 18, 2015 |
| 3 | 10 | September 11, 2016 | October 30, 2016 |

== Episodes ==
=== Season 1 (2014) ===
| No. overall | No. in season | Title | Original release date | US viewers (millions) |
|---|---|---|---|---|
| 1 | 1 | "The Princess Bride" | October 5, 2014 | 1.72 |
Lauren prepares for her wedding and decides to do a bridal dress photo shoot. She also chooses to get botox injections in her armpits to eliminate the sweat and Jacqueline suggests her help. Caroline overhears their conversation and disapproves.
| 2 | 2 | "The Flying Manzos" | October 5, 2014 | 1.57 |
Albie and Chris move back to their parents' house. Caroline wants to lose weight, but is reluctant about exercising. Albie, Chris and Lauren suggest she start taking trapeze lessons.
| 3 | 3 | "Off to the Races" | October 12, 2014 | 1.34 |
Albie introduces his new girlfriend Brittany to his family, but they are unimpressed. Albie and Chris plan to open a new restaurant.
| 4 | 4 | "Brothers & Sisters" | October 19, 2014 | 1.05 |
Lauren and Albie get into an argument as Lauren questions his relationship with Brittany. When things get too serious, Caroline comes between them and demands that they make up. Caroline continues working on her sauce line.
| 5 | 5 | "In Your Cafface!" | October 26, 2014 | 1.31 |
Lauren starts renovating Cafface, turning it into a blowout bar. Caroline is upset about the changes, concerned about what she views as questionable business decisions and unsure whether Brittany is right for Albie.
| 6 | 6 | "Secret Sauce" | October 26, 2014 | 1.00 |
The Manzo family travels to Texas for a family vacation, but also so Caroline can do some research for her upcoming BBQ sauce line.
| 7 | 7 | "Tattoo Nightmare" | November 2, 2014 | 1.39 |
Caroline works on her BBQ sauce line. The episode mostly focuses on Albie and Brittany's relationship. Things get a little tense as she is unhappy with a gift Albie has given her.
| 8 | 8 | "The Love Boat" | November 2, 2014 | 1.14 |
Albie asks Caroline for relationship advice. Caroline and her husband spend their 30th wedding anniversary going on a trip along the Hudson River on their new boat. Lauren and Chris argue about what anniversary gift to give to their parents.

=== Season 2 (2015) ===
| No. overall | No. in season | Title | Original release date | US viewers (millions) |
|---|---|---|---|---|
| 9 | 1 | "Heavy Meddling" | August 16, 2015 | 0.93 |
Lauren and Vito are preparing for their upcoming nuptials. Meanwhile, Chris and Albie's lives are moving in separate directions. Caroline feels very protective of her sons.
| 10 | 2 | "Mama Manzo's Day" | August 23, 2015 | 0.74 |
Caroline offers financial advice to Lauren and Vito. Chris thinks of a meaningful present to give to his mother; Albie remembers being kicked out of law school. The family later attends a Mother's Day brunch.
| 11 | 3 | "Introducing Bridezilla" | August 30, 2015 | 0.95 |
Caroline is fed up with her children's immaturity. Albie works on his love life. The Manzo children try to make peace with their mother, but Lauren's bridezilla tendencies cause further conflict.
| 12 | 4 | "Very Brittany Bridal Shower" | September 13, 2015 | 0.84 |
| 13 | 5 | "Meat the Scalias" | September 20, 2015 | 0.85 |
| 14 | 6 | "Brothers of the Bride" | September 27, 2015 | 0.67 |
| 15 | 7 | "Dazed but Not Confused" | October 4, 2015 | 0.72 |
| 16 | 8 | "The Tale of Two Families" | October 11, 2015 | 0.91 |
| 17 | 9 | "Mama Mia!" | October 18, 2015 | 0.91 |
| 18 | 10 | "Emotional Baggage" | October 25, 2015 | 1.05 |
| 19 | 11 | "Embracing the Crazy" | November 1, 2015 | 1.10 |
| 20 | 12 | "Do You Take the Manzo Family?" | November 1, 2015 | 0.99 |

=== Season 3 (2016) ===
| No. overall | No. in season | Title | Original release date | US viewers (millions) |
|---|---|---|---|---|
| 21 | 1 | "A Family That Scares Together" | September 11, 2016 | 0.92 |
| 22 | 2 | "A Class in Creativity" | September 11, 2016 | 0.76 |
| 23 | 3 | "Planting a Seed" | September 18, 2016 | 0.74 |
| 24 | 4 | "Craft Sales & Orgy Tales" | September 25, 2016 | 0.92 |
| 25 | 5 | "Newlywed Games" | October 2, 2016 | 0.97 |
| 26 | 6 | "For Better or Worse" | October 9, 2016 | 0.70 |
| 27 | 7 | "I'm Ovu-Leaving" | October 16, 2016 | 0.88 |
| 28 | 8 | "California Dreamin'" | October 23, 2016 | 0.72 |
| 29 | 9 | "Holy Bologna!" | October 30, 2016 | 0.91 |
| 30 | 10 | "Startling Surprises" | October 30, 2016 | 0.78 |
