= Envy by Melissa Gorga =

American fashion chain

envy by Melissa Gorga
- Company type: Fashion boutique
- Industry: Fashion
- Founded: December 2015; 10 years ago Montclair, New Jersey, United States
- Founders: Melissa Gorga; Jackie Beard Robinson
- Number of locations: 2 stores (2026); Ridgewood, New Jersey; Huntington, New York
- Owner: Melissa Gorga
- Website: envybymg.com

Envy by Melissa Gorga (stylized as envy by Melissa Gorga; often shortened to Envy) is an American fashion boutique, clothing and accessory chain founded in 2015 by reality television personality Melissa Gorga. As of 2024, the chain has two locations in New Jersey and New York.

== Background and locations ==
After a successful jewelry line with the Home Shopping Network, Melissa Gorga co-founded Envy by Melissa Gorga with stylist Jackie Beard Robinson. Gorga's husband, Joe Gorga, constructed the interior of the boutique. The first boutique opened on January 14, 2016, located at 609 Bloomfield Avenue, in Montclair, New Jersey. In January 2017, the boutique temporarily closed after Robinson emptied the entire store of its inventory and gave the merchandise to Allendale boutique owner Kim Depoala. The boutique reopened the same month, with Robinson no longer being a business partner nor co-owner.

In March 2022, the flagship location was relocated to Ridgewood, New Jersey, in search for a bigger space. In January 2024, Gorga announced the opening of a second boutique location, extending the location to Long Island, New York. The second boutique's grand opening was held on March 24, 2024 in Huntington, New York; attendees included: Kelly Bensimon, Margaret Josephs, and Rachel Fuda.
