= Joy Browne =

American psychologist (1944–2016)

- Born: Joy Oppenheim; October 24, 1944; New Orleans, Louisiana, U.S.
- Died: August 27, 2016 (aged 71); New York City, U.S.
- Other name: Dr. Joy
- Education: Rice University; Northeastern University (MA, PhD)
- Occupation: Talk show host
- Spouse: Carter Browne (divorced)
- Children: 1

Joy Browne (born Joy Oppenheim; October 24, 1944 – August 27, 2016), also known as Dr. Joy, was an American talk show host, specializing in advice counselling. She hosted a nationally syndicated call-in talk show for several decades, heard on numerous radio stations in the U.S. and Canada.

== Early life ==
Browne was born Joy Oppenheim in New Orleans, Louisiana, the oldest of five children born to Nelson Oppenheim, a life insurance salesman, and Ruth Strauss, a teacher. Browne spent much of her childhood in Denver, Colorado, and graduated from Rice University in Houston, Texas, with a bachelor's degree in behavioral science.

== Career ==
Browne did her graduate work at Northeastern University in Boston, Massachusetts, earning an M.A. and Ph.D. in psychology. She was a licensed clinical psychologist who was first on the air in Boston at WITS, where she hosted a program called Up Close and Personal in the late 1970s. She later hosted call-in shows on radio stations in San Francisco and New York City.

Her syndicated show was one of the longest-running call-in therapy shows in the United States. Browne took a no-nonsense approach to callers, trying to zero in on a problem without getting caught up in a caller's long stories or digressions. Browne was also known for her "one-year rule", which states that people who have lost a spouse or long-time partner due to break-up, death, or divorce should wait at a minimum one year before resuming romantic relationships.

Browne was also known for her advice to act "stupid and cheerful" when dealing with difficult people. She also half-jokingly suggested that people wait until they are 40 or 45 years old before having sex, due to the emotional nakedness involved, in addition to the physical.

Browne hosted a TV show on the Discovery Health cable channel in 2005 which was a live one-hour simulcast of her weekday show on WOR. She previously hosted a King World-Eyemark weekday syndicated TV advice talk show in 1999 for one year.

She wrote numerous books on life and dating, including It’s A Jungle Out There Jane, Dating for Dummies, The Nine Fantasies That Will Ruin Your Life, Capitalizing on Incompetence, Getting Unstuck, and Dating Disasters.

On September 30, 2010, Browne joined the cast of the off-Broadway play My Big Gay Italian Wedding for three performances.

Browne's call-in therapy show was heard for two decades at 710 WOR in New York and was syndicated to other cities via the WOR Radio Network. She was released by WOR on December 20, 2012, after iHeartMedia bought the station and brought in its own network hosts. Bumper music for the show was often the bass line from the Nick Lowe song "Cracking Up."

Beginning in January 2013, Browne was heard on Radio America from Noon-3p.m. ET on weekdays. On September 8, 2014, she switched to the Genesis Communications Network (GCN), continuing her syndicated radio show in the same time slot.

== Personal life and death ==
Browne was married once (to Carter Browne, whom she divorced, although she kept her married name professionally) and had a daughter, Patience Browne. Browne died in Manhattan on August 27, 2016, at the age of 71.
