= Teresa Checks In =

Television series

- Genre: Reality television
- Starring: Teresa Giudice; Joe Giudice; Gia Giudice; Milania Giudice; Gabriella Giudice; Audriana Giudice
- Country of origin: United States
- Original language: English
- No. of seasons: 1
- No. of episodes: 3

Production
- Executive producers: Rebecca Toth Diefenbach; Valerie Haselton; Lucilla D'Agostino; Caroline Self; Jacob Huddleston; Andy Cohen
- Running time: 43 minutes
- Production company: Sirens Media

Original release
- Network: Bravo
- Release: October 11 – October 25, 2015

Related
- The Real Housewives of New Jersey

Teresa Checks In is an American reality television series that premiered on the Bravo cable network on October 11, 2015. The three-part television special chronicles the life of the Giudice family and how its members dealt with the aftermath of Teresa Giudice's being sentenced to prison. Teresa is known for having appeared on The Real Housewives of New Jersey since its premiere in 2009, and on Celebrity Apprentice 5 (2012), and for writing a series of bestselling books.

The series is the second spin-off of The Real Housewives of New Jersey, following Manzo'd with Children.

== Episodes ==
No.	Title	Original release date	US viewers (millions)
1	"Tre of Life"	October 11, 2015	1.23
The family celebrates its important events for the first time without Teresa. Joe and the girls get help and support from their relatives, including Melissa Gorga and Rosie Pierri. Teresa calls her family and sends daily e-mails.
2	"Mr. Mom for Shore"	October 18, 2015	1.29
The family goes on a trip to the Jersey Shore to visit their previous home, possibly for the last time. Joe talks to a friend who has been to a prison. The Giudice family celebrates Independence Day with the Gorgas.
3	"The Visit"	October 25, 2015	1.42
Joe Gorga visits his sister for the first time. Difficult times help the Gorga and Giudice families to draw closer together. Teresa continues to communicate with her family as much as possible.
