= Dave Cantin =

American entrepreneur and philanthropist

- Born: David Scott Cantin; October 26, 1979 (age 46); Red Bank, New Jersey, U.S.
- Occupations: Entrepreneur; Investor; Innovator; Philanthropist; Life strategist; Business strategist
- Spouse: Dina Cantin (m. 2017)
- Website: www.davecantin.com

David Scott Cantin (born October 26, 1979) is an American entrepreneur and philanthropist.

== Early life ==
He was born David Scott Cantin on October 26, 1979, in Red Bank, New Jersey. He is the youngest of three children.

Cantin worked his way through Freehold Township High School. He started working full time in the car business at age 18 and was general manager of a dealership by the age of 21. By 27 he was a general partner at a large car dealership.

== Career ==
NJ BIZ featured him in their 2014 edition of "40 under 40", for contributing to Brad Benson Auto Group, of which he was Vice-Chairman at the time, becoming one of the largest Hyundai dealerships in the U.S. Also in 2014, founding member of Kiss and Rock & Roll Hall of Fame inductee, Peter Criss, presented Cantin with the Man of Courage Award for Philanthropy sponsored by the Beauty Foundation. He was recognized because of his courage to stand tall in the face of insurmountable adversity. In early 2016 Cantin sold his stake in Brad Benson Hyundai. He now lives bi-coastal between New York and California.

In 2018, Cantin started his own financial advisory company serving the automotive sector called Dave Cantin Group.

The Dave Cantin Group encompasses DCG Acquisitions, DCG Capital, and DCG Media, offering a suite of financial services tailored to the needs of automotive businesses and professionals.

== Philanthropy ==
Cantin was diagnosed with leukemia in 2011. After five years of chemotherapy, he was declared cancer-free.

Cantin fundraises for pediatric cancer research. He was a board member for Hyundai Hope on Wheels, which raises funds for research into cures for pediatric cancer, and launched The Cantin Family Foundation for his family's charitable efforts. After his diagnosis, he joined the boards of two more foundations: Columbia University Medical Center’s Hope & Heroes, and New Jersey-based Project Ladybug.

In his current venture, Dave Cantin Group, Cantin has pledged a percentage of all future deal commissions will be donated to a local charity fighting pediatric cancer in the location of the acquired dealership.

Cantin started DCG Giving, the charitable arm of the Dave Cantin Group, a 501(c)(3) charity dedicated to directly benefiting young people diagnosed with pediatric cancer and their families. All of the institutions that work with DCG Giving are members of the Children’s Oncology Group, the world’s largest organization conducting cancer research specifically for children and adolescents. For every transaction DCG closes, a portion of the proceeds go directly to this cause.

== Personal life ==
Cantin married Dina Cantin in June 2017.
