= Dina Cantin =

American television personality and businesswoman (born 1972)

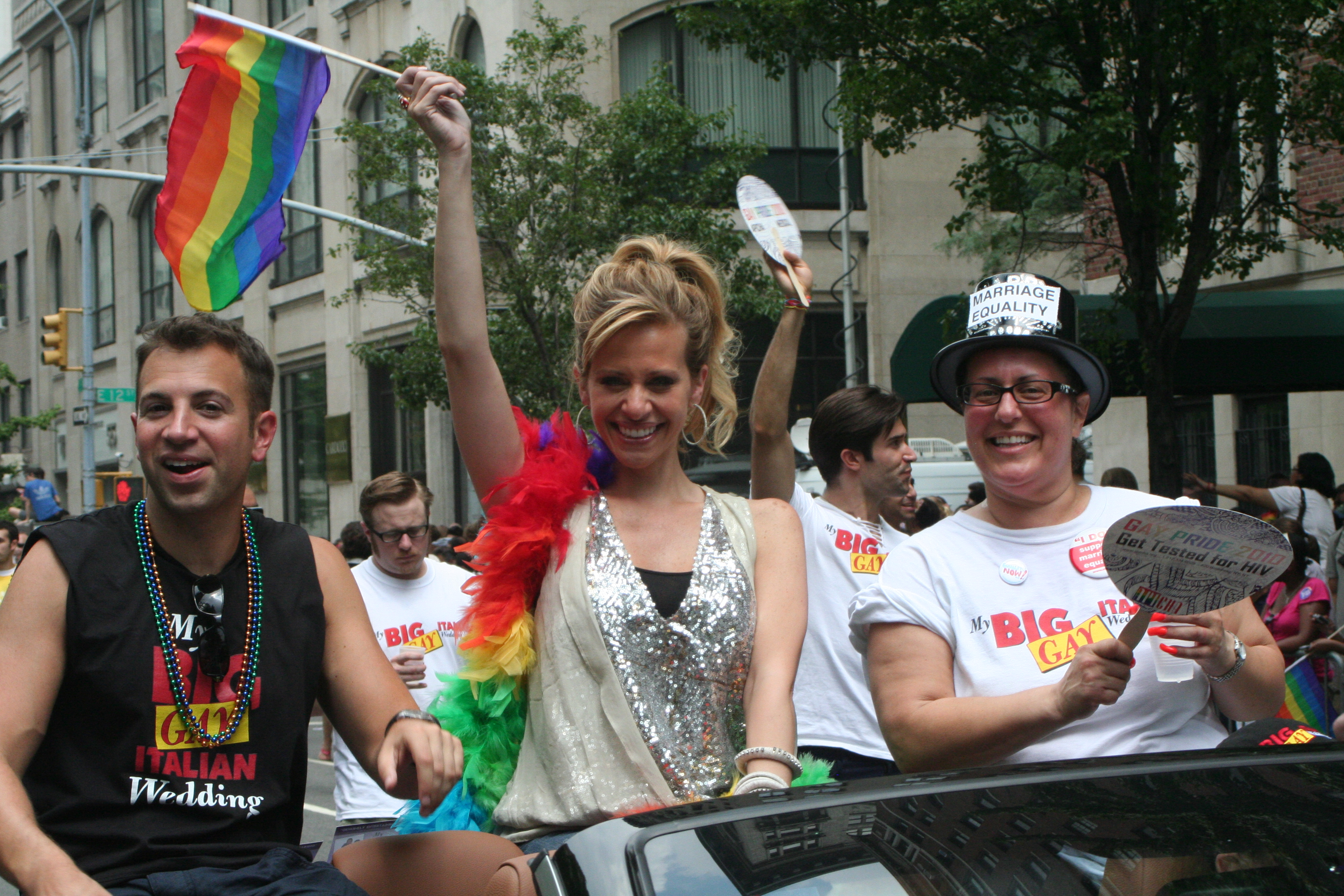
- Cantin at NYC Pride March in 2010
- Born: Claudine J. Laurita; March 7, 1972 (age 54); Brooklyn, New York, U.S.
- Occupations: Television personality; businesswoman
- Years active: 2007–present
- Known for: The Real Housewives of New Jersey
- Height: 1.63 m (5 ft 4 in)
- Spouses: George Ioannou; Thomas Manzo (m. 2007; div. 2016) Dave Cantin (m. 2017)
- Children: 1
- Relatives: Caroline Manzo (sister); Jacqueline Laurita (sister-in-law)

Claudine J. "Dina" Cantin (née Laurita, formerly Manzo and Ioannou; born March 7, 1972) is an American reality television personality and businesswoman. She is most known for appearing on The Real Housewives of New Jersey as an original main cast member, appearing in that capacity from 2009–2010 and 2014, as well as her own party-planning television series Dina's Party.

== Career ==
Born in Brooklyn, New York, the youngest of 11 children, Cantin at age six moved with her family to Wayne, New Jersey. In 2007, Cantin (then known as Dina Manzo) and her then husband Thomas Manzo appeared in an episode of VH1's My Fabulous Wedding. In 2009, Cantin appeared in the first two seasons of The Real Housewives of New Jersey, a reality series focusing on a group of women living in New Jersey, before departing. In 2014, Cantin returned for the sixth season. In 2015, she departed the series due to relocating to California. In 2011, Cantin hosted the party-planning series Dina's Party on HGTV. It was later cancelled after two seasons.

Cantin runs Project Ladybug, a nonprofit foundation that focuses on helping children diagnosed with cancer and their families pay for medical bills and other expenses.

In 2016, Cantin released a skincare product line titled Glow by Dina.

== Personal life ==
Dina Cantin has appeared on The Real Housewives of New Jersey alongside her sister Caroline Manzo, brother Chris Laurita, and sister-in-law Jacqueline Laurita. She has one daughter, Lexi Ioannou, born January 25, 1996. In October 2012, Cantin separated from her then husband Tommy Manzo. In February 2016, their divorce was finalized.

Cantin is close friends with former co-star Teresa Giudice. She is the godmother of Giudice's daughter, Audriana.

In 2015, Cantin moved from Franklin Lakes, New Jersey to Malibu, California.

In May 2017, Cantin and her then boyfriend Dave Cantin were the victims of a robbery at her home. The two married a month later, in June 2017.

On December 16, 2020, Lucchese crime family soldier John Perna pleaded guilty to aggravated assault on Dave Cantin. Perna was hired by Thomas Manzo, who is the ex-husband of Cantin; Perna carried out the assault in exchange for a discounted price for his wedding reception.

== Filmography ==
Television
| Year | Title | Role | Notes |
|---|---|---|---|
| 2007 | My Big Fat Fabulous Wedding | Bride/herself | Series premiere, episode: “Dina & Tommy" |
| 2009–2010, 2012, 2014 | The Real Housewives of New Jersey | Herself | Series regular: seasons 1–2, 6; guest: season 4 |
| 2012–2014 | Dina’s Party | Host/herself | Series regular |
| 2015 | Teresa Checks In | Herself | Episode: “Mr. Mom for Shore” |
| 2015 | Manzo'd with Children | Bride's Aunt/herself | Episode: “Do You Take, the Manzo Family?” |
| 2016 | Tainted Dreams | Alessandra DiGiacoma | Episode: “Let’s Fill the Void” |
