= Amber Marchese =

American television personality (born 1977)

- Born: August 13, 1977 (age 48); New Jersey, U.S.
- Education: Monmouth University (BBA); Teachers College, Columbia University (MS)
- Occupations: Businesswoman, television personality
- Years active: 2014–present
- Known for: The Real Housewives of New Jersey
- Spouse: James Marchese (m. 2004)
- Children: 2

Amber Marchese (born August 13, 1977) is an American reality television personality and businesswoman. She is known for starring in the reality television series The Real Housewives of New Jersey.

== Career ==
Amber appeared on the sixth season of Bravo's The Real Housewives of New Jersey in 2014. However, she exited the series after one season. In July 2016, it was announced that Marchese and her husband would be appearing on the eighth season of Marriage Boot Camp, that is also known as Marriage Boot Camp: Reality Stars 6.

Apart from appearing on the show, Marchese owns a fitness and consulting company Vici Fitness. In 2018, Marchese appeared on the "Tony's Tea Corner" Podcast with host Anthony "Tony" Lario.

== Personal life ==
Marchese is married to James Marchese, with whom she has two children, Corbin and Isabella. James and his ex-wife Rebecca Grande have two sons, Michael and Sebastian. Marchese graduated with a Bachelor’s of Business Administration from Monmouth University, and later studied at Teachers College, Columbia University, where she received a master’s degree in bio-behavioral studies and exercise physiology.

In April 2016, James Marchese was arrested for domestic violence, after allegedly grabbing and threatening Amber. She later responded to the allegations, saying they are false and issuing a statement: "Domestic violence is not a joke, and having my husband be accused of such a heinous act is not only hurtful but damaging personally, emotionally and professionally. I would never let myself be a victim of anything or anyone". In May 2016, Marchese's husband Jim announced he plans on suing Virgin Airlines for $100 million, citing a flight attendant misinterpreted him and Amber snuggling on the airplane. In October 2016, the two officially filed a lawsuit against the airline for false imprisonment. In January 2017, Virgin Airlines filed a lawsuit against Marchese, stating the two lied after the alleged domestic violence occurred. In August 2018, both lawsuits were dropped.

Marchese was diagnosed and survived breast cancer twice. In June 2016, Marchese announced she had Lyme disease.
