= Melissa Gorga =

American reality television participant

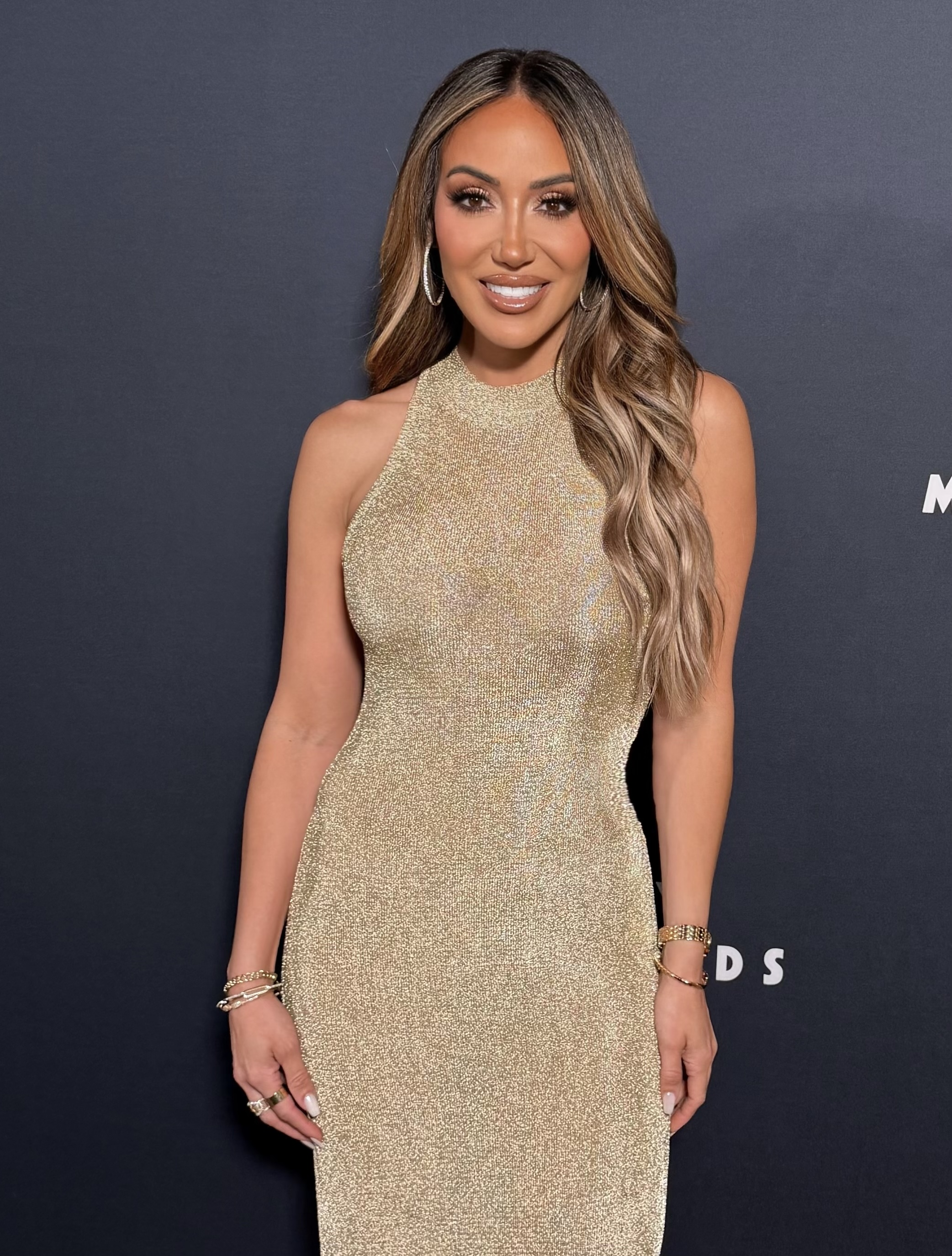
- Gorga in 2026
- Born: Melissa Ann Marco; March 21, 1979 (age 47); Toms River, New Jersey, U.S.
- Education: New Jersey City University (BA)
- Occupations: Television personality; entrepreneur
- Years active: 2011–present
- Spouse: Joe Gorga (m. 2004)
- Children: 3
- Relatives: Teresa Giudice (sister-in-law); Gia Giudice (niece); Kathy Wakile (cousin-in-law)
- Website: melissagorga.com

Melissa Ann Gorga (née Marco; born March 21, 1979) is an American television personality, entrepreneur, and businesswoman. She is best known for being a cast member on The Real Housewives of New Jersey, joining the show in its third season in 2011.

Beyond her career in television, Gorga is the owner and founder of Envy by Melissa Gorga, a fashion boutique which has locations in New Jersey and New York, and the bakery brand Let's Sprinkle by Melissa Gorga.

== Early life ==
Gorga was born on March 21, 1979. She is of full Italian descent and grew up in Toms River, New Jersey. She attended New Jersey City University and lived in Bayonne, New Jersey, while in college.

== Career ==
Gorga first gained notoriety in 2011, when she joined Bravo's reality television series The Real Housewives of New Jersey; filming alongside sister-in-law Teresa Giudice. That year, she appeared on the cover of the Boardwalk Journal for its August issue.

Gorga embarked on her career in music, releasing her first single "On Display", which was released on iTunes on August 13, 2011. Other singles were previewed on several season four episodes, and Gorga issued a four-song EP. As of July 5, 2012, she has released two additional singles on iTunes: "How Many Times", released April 29, 2012, and "Rockstar", released June 10, 2012. Her fourth single, "I Just Wanna", was released September, and was featured by hip hop singer Santino Noir, who also wrote the song. The official music video was released on October 12, 2012 via YouTube. In January 2016, Gorga told E! News she wouldn't be continuing her music career, but expressed interest to returning to music in the future.

In September 2013, Gorga published her relationship, self-help book, Love Italian Style: The Secrets of My Hot and Happy Marriage, with St. Martin's Griffin. The book received a mix of negative reviews, with some critics finding the book sexist, and promoting outdated gender roles. Rachael Berman of The Humanist cited the book as "anti-feminist," while Tracie Egan Morrissey of Jezebel accused Gorga of advocating "marital rape". Gorga argued that while she knew the book would be controversial, her intent was to advocate "putting your partner first."

In 2014, Gorga introduced her jewelry line, the Melissa Gorga Collection, on HSN. In late 2015, she, along with business partner Jackie Beard Robinson, opened the Envy clothing boutique in Montclair, New Jersey, with its interior built by her husband, Joe. In 2016, Gorga (with sister-in-law Teresa Giudice) appeared in pictorials for Us Weekly and Paper magazine. In January 2017, Envy was temporarily closed due to a dispute with Robinson; it re-opened later that month with Robinson no longer a partner.

In May 2017, the Gorgas opened a restaurant in East Hanover, New Jersey with Teresa Giudice named Gorga's Homemade Pasta and Pizza. In January 2018, the restaurant closed in search of larger space and new management.

In November 2021, Gorga starred in the first season of The Real Housewives spin-off,The Real Housewives Ultimate Girls Trip, which premiered on Peacock. From December 2021 to July 2025, Gorga hosted her podcast with PodcastOne titled On Display, named after her first single.

In March 2024, Gorga opened the second Envy by Melissa Gorga boutique in Huntington, New York. In December, Gorga launched her sprinkle cookie company Sprinkle by MG (later rebranded to Let's Sprinkle by MG), specializing in sprinkle cookies. Within three months, the company brought in $500k of revenue. Additional products including coffee cake, almond vanilla coffee, oven mitts and mugs. In September 2025, Gorga and husband Joe appeared in the Fox celebrity game show, Celebrity Weakest Link. The following month in October, she appeared in an episode of Wife Swap: The Real Housewives Edition, a spin-off of the global Wife Swap format.

== Personal life ==
She is married to Giuseppe "Joe" Gorga, who also appears on The Real Housewives of New Jersey and is the brother of cast member Teresa Giudice. The Gorgas have 3 children: Antonia (b. 2005), Giacinto "Gino" (b. 2007), and Giuseppe "Joey" (b. 2010), and reside in Montville, New Jersey.

== Filmography ==
Television appearances
| Year | Title | Role | Notes |
|---|---|---|---|
| 2011–present | The Real Housewives of New Jersey | Herself | Series regular; 151 episodes |
| 2012–24 | Watch What Happens Live! | Herself | Guest; 17 episodes |
| 2015 | Teresa Checks In | Herself | 3 episodes |
| 2015 | Manzo'd with Children | Herself | Episode: "Do You Take, the Manzo Family?" |
| 2018 | Lip Sync Battle | Herself | Episode: "Ramona Singer vs. Melissa Gorga" |
| 2019 | The Real Housewives of Atlanta | Herself | 2 episodes |
| 2020 | The Real Housewives of New York City | Herself | Episode: "Not So Model Behavior" |
| 2021, 2026 | The Real Housewives Ultimate Girls Trip | Herself | Season 1; 7 episodes Guest; Season 5 |
| 2023 | Kitchen Nightmares | Herself | Episode: "Max's" |
| 2025 | Jersey Shore: Family Vacation | Herself | Episode: "Jamaica Bound" |
| 2025 | Celebrity Weakest Link | Herself | Episode: "Reality Couples" |
| 2025 | Wife Swap: The Real Housewives Edition | Herself | Episode: "Too Cool for Gabagool" |

== Discography ==
Songs
| Title | Year |
|---|---|
| "On Display" | 2011 |
| "How Many Times" | 2012 |
| "Rockstar" | 2012 |
| "I Just Wanna" (featuring Santino Noir) | 2012 |
| "Never Let Me Go" | 2013 |
| Work Done | Fiber One (featuring: Melissa Gorga, Porsha Williams, Sonja Morgan) | 2019 |

== Published works ==
- Love Italian Style: The Secrets of My Hot and Happy Marriage, St. Martin's Press, 2013. ISBN 978-1250041487
