= The Real Housewives of New Jersey =

American reality television series

- Genre: Reality television
- Starring: Teresa Giudice; Jacqueline Laurita; Caroline Manzo; Dina Manzo; Danielle Staub; Melissa Gorga; Kathy Wakile; Teresa Aprea; Amber Marchese; Nicole Napolitano; Dolores Catania; Siggy Flicker; Margaret Josephs; Jennifer Aydin; Jackie Goldschneider; Danielle Cabral; Rachel Fuda
- Composers: David Vanacore; Craig Sharmat
- Country of origin: United States
- Original language: English
- No. of seasons: 14
- No. of episodes: 249 (list of episodes)

Production
- Executive producers: Rebecca Toth Diefenbach; Valerie Haselton; Lucilla D'Agostino; Jim Fraenkel; Omid Kahangi; Caroline Self; Andy Cohen; Tess Gamboa Meyers; Amy Kohn; Luke Neslage; Deanna Markoff; Dorothy Toran; Jessica Sebastian; Jordana Hochman; Lauren Volonakis; Taylor Lucy Choi; Sarah Howell; Mioshi Hill; Maggie Langtry; Lisa Levey
- Camera setup: Multiple
- Running time: 41–43 minutes
- Production company: Sirens Media

Original release
- Network: Bravo
- Release: May 12, 2009 – present

Related
- Boys to Manzo; Manzo'd with Children; Teresa Checks In

The Real Housewives of New Jersey, abbreviated RHONJ, is an American reality television series that premiered on May 12, 2009, on Bravo. Developed as the fourth installment of The Real Housewives franchise, it has aired fourteen seasons and focuses on the personal and professional lives of several women residing in the state of New Jersey, primarily in North Jersey.

The cast of the first season consisted of Teresa Giudice, Jacqueline Laurita, Caroline and Dina Cantin, and Danielle Staub. Other housewives that starred in the subsequent fourteen seasons include Kathy Wakile, Teresa Aprea, Amber Marchese, Nicole Napolitano, Margaret Josephs, Siggy Flicker, Jennifer Aydin, Jackie Goldschneider, Danielle Cabral and Rachel Fuda. The cast of the fifteenth season will star Guidice, Melissa Gorga, Dolores Catania, Malvina Blloshmi, Xio Cammarota, Juliette Collazo, Deeba Patel, and Natia Rufolo. The success of the show has resulted in the spin-offs Boys to Manzo, Manzo'd with Children, and Teresa Checks In.

== Overview ==
=== Seasons 1–5 ===
The Real Housewives of New Jersey was announced by Bravo on April 15, 2008. The first season premiered on May 12, 2009, and starred Caroline Manzo, Jacqueline Laurita, Teresa Giudice, Dina Cantin and Danielle Staub with Dolores Catania as a friend of the housewives. For the first time in The Real Housewives franchise, the series followed cast members who are related to one another: sisters Caroline Manzo and Dina Cantin were at the time married to brothers Albert and Tommy Manzo, and Laurita is married to Caroline and Dina's brother, Chris Laurita. Dina and Tommy Manzo would later end up separated. The second season premiered on May 3, 2010, with Dina Manzo departing the series after the seventh episode. Staub left the show after the second season.

The third season premiered on May 16, 2011, with new housewives Melissa Gorga, Teresa Giudice's sister-in-law, and Kathy Wakile, Teresa's cousin. Kathy's sister, Rosie Pierri, appeared as a guest. It delivered the highest rated season premiere in Bravo's history and the highest-rated season premiere in The Real Housewives franchise at the time.

The fourth season premiered on April 22, 2012; Giudice, Laurita, Caroline, Gorga, and Wakile returned to their primary capacities. The fifth season premiered on June 2, 2013, with all five housewives from the previous season returning. On October 13, Caroline Manzo confirmed her voluntary departure from the series to her BravoTV.com blog. Four days later, E! Online revealed that Wakile and Laurita would also not be returning to the series for the sixth season. Wakile confirmed her departure in May the following year.

=== Seasons 6–9 ===
Following the exit announcements of Wakile and Laurita, it was announced Amber Marchese and twin sisters Teresa Aprea and Nicole Napolitano would be joining the cast. On October 29, Dina announced her return as a full-time cast member on social media. The sixth season premiered on July 13, 2014. Wakile and Laurita both appeared in a "friend of" capacity, while Giudice and Gorga remained as full-time housewives. In November 2015, Marchese announced her departure after only one season. In May 2016, Dina announced her second departure from the series.

In January 2016, NJ.com reported that Dolores Catania and relationship expert Siggy Flicker were set to join the show. On February 8, Bravo Media announced the series would return for a seventh season amidst Giudice's release from prison, subsequently affirming her return, as well as the full-time returns of Gorga and Laurita. On May 24, the season seven cast was revealed, consisting of Giudice, Gorga, Laurita, Catania, and Flicker. Ths seventh season premiered on July 10, 2016. Wakile returned, once again as "friends of the housewives", along with Rosie Pierri. Aprea and Napolitano also made a guest appearance. On April 3, 2017, Laurita announced she would again exit the series. In May, Wakile also revealed she would be leaving once again.

The eighth season was announced on April 27, 2017. In August, Bravo revealed that with the exception of the previously-announced Laurita, the entire full-time cast would be returning. Margaret Josephs was announced as a new housewife, as well as the return of Staub, who would serve in the recurring "friend" capacity. The season premiered on October 4, 2017. On December 22, during the airing of the season, Flicker announced her exit from the series.

In March 2018, Us Weekly reported filming for the ninth season was underway, with Giudice, Gorga, Catania, Josephs, and Staub participating. The season was announced by Bravo in the following month, on April 11. Two days later, it was reported that Jackie Goldschneider and Jennifer Aydin had joined the cast. In September, Bravo revealed the series regular cast would consist of Giudice, Gorga, Catania, Josephs, Aydin, and Goldschneider, with Staub also returning in a "friend" capacity. Season nine premiered on November 7, 2018.

=== Seasons 10–present ===
Filming for the tenth season was revealed to be underway in March 2019, with all cast members from the previous season returning. The season premiered on November 6, 2019. On January 8, 2020, Staub announced her resignation from the show for the second time.

Filming for the eleventh season was postponed by Bravo in March 2020 due to the COVID-19 pandemic. The eleventh season premiered on February 17, 2021. The twelfth season premiered on February 1, 2022, with Traci Johnson added as a friend of the housewives. The thirteenth season premiered on February 7, 2023, with new full-time housewives Danielle Cabral and Rachel Fuda joining the cast, as well as Jennifer Fessler joining as a friend of the housewives, alongside former housewife Jackie Goldschneider. The fourteenth season premiered on May 5, 2024, with the entire cast from the thirteenth season returning. In June 2024, it was reported that there would not be a traditional reunion for the fourteenth season, making this for the first time in the show's history.

In March 2026, Josephs announced her departure from the franchise. That same month, Bravo announced production on the fifteenth season would begin in mid-2026, with Catania, Giudice, and Gorga returning as full-time housewives. In October 2026, Bravo announced that Malvina Blloshmi, Xio Cammarota, Juliette Collazo, Deeba Patel, and Natia Rufolo would be the new main housewives for the upcoming season, while Vanessa Barerra would join as a friend of the cast. The season is set to premiere on January 19, 2027.

== Cast ==
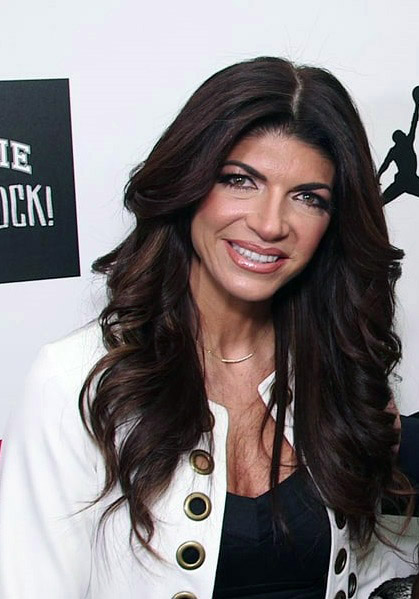
Teresa Giudice

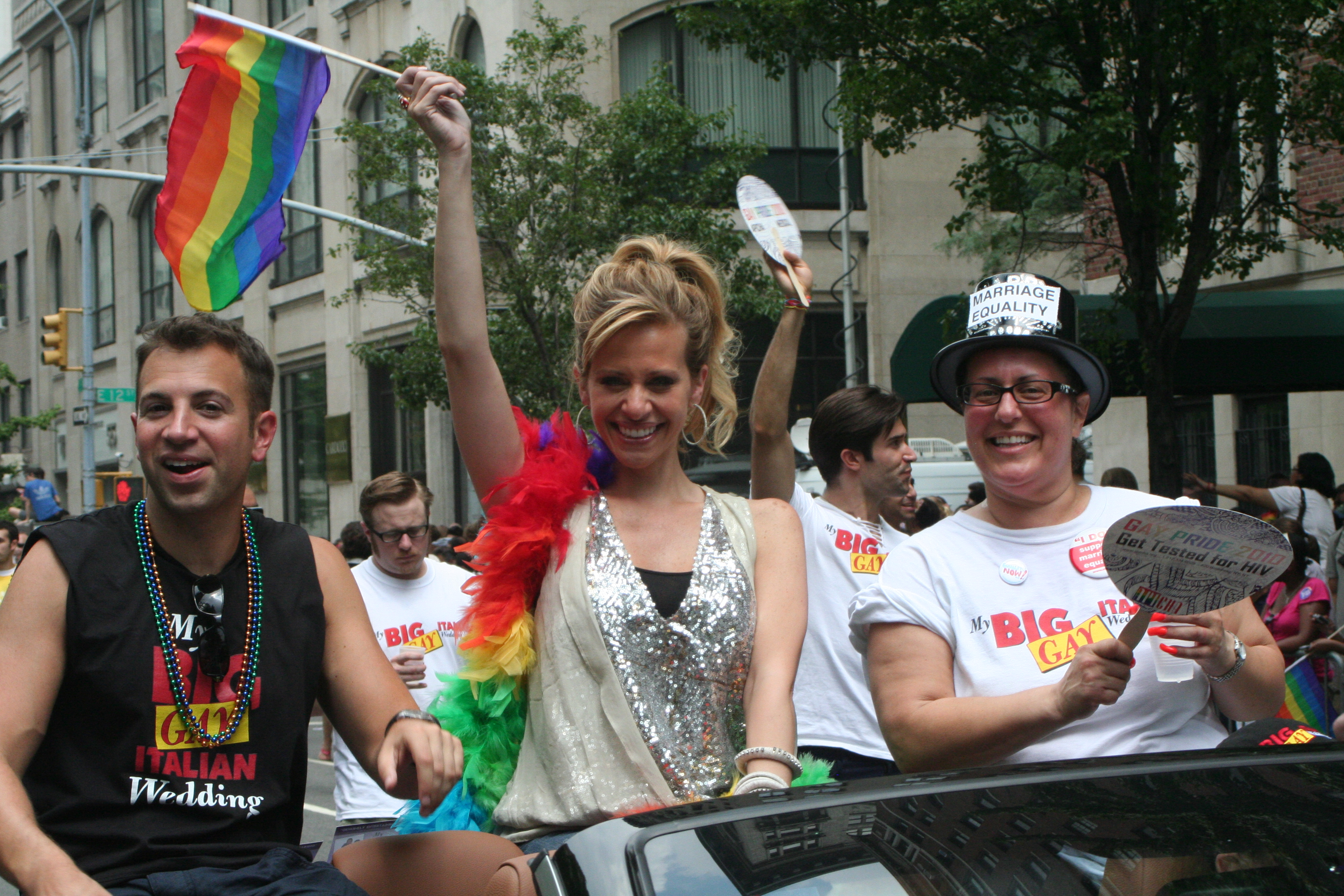
Dina Manzo

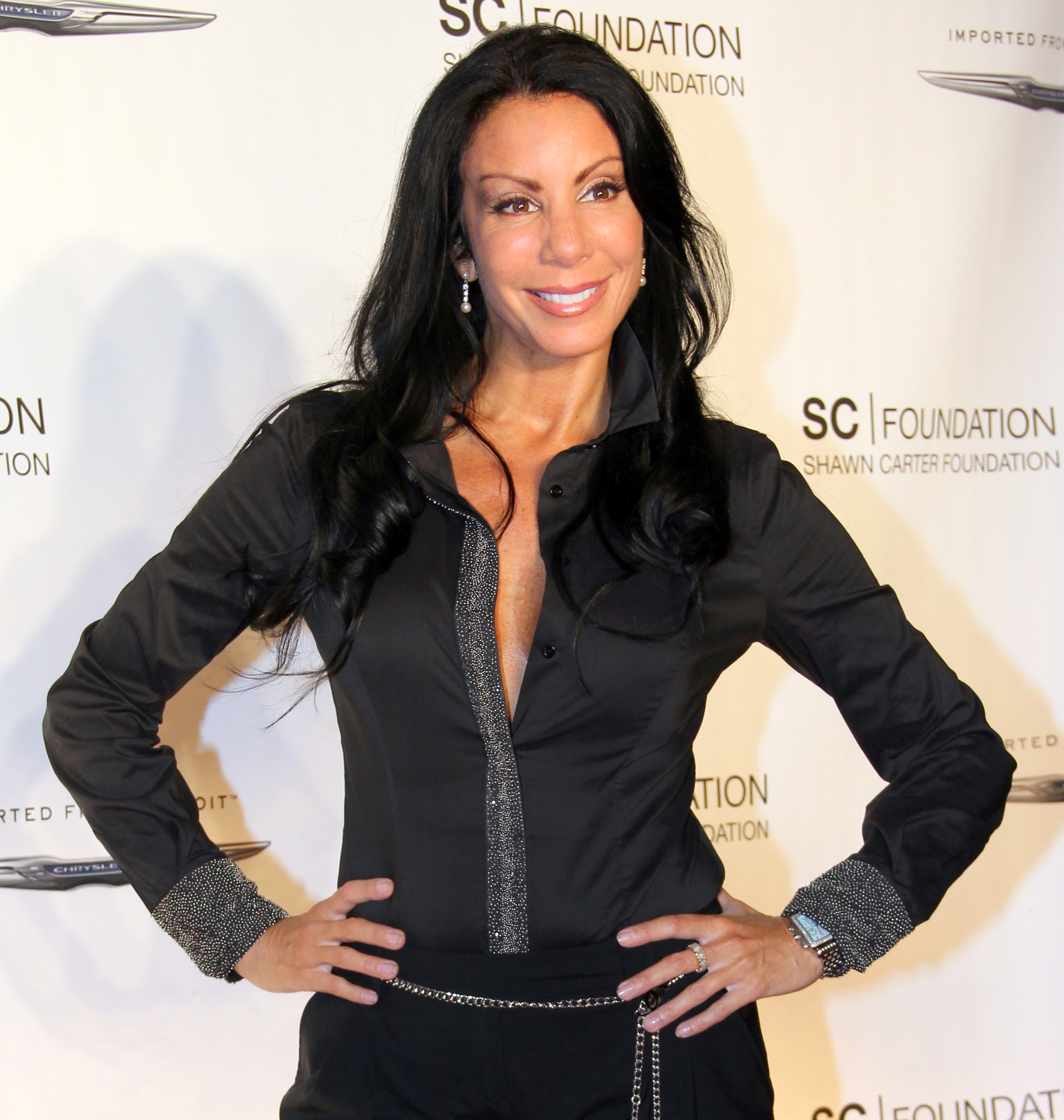
Danielle Staub

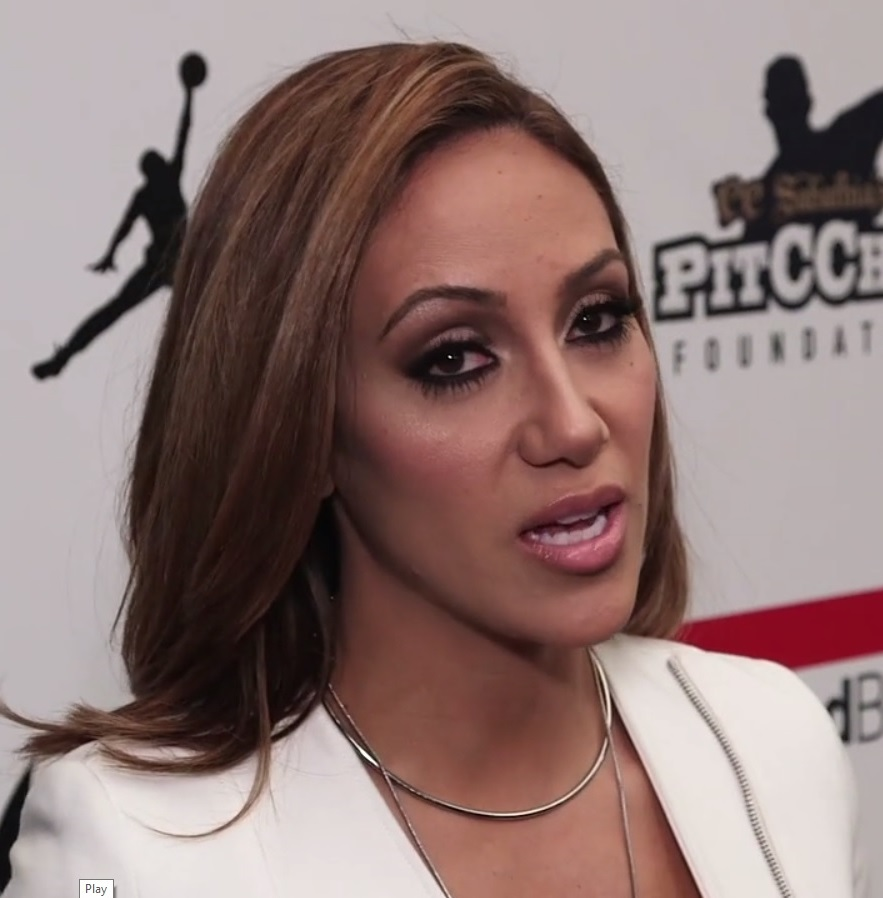
Melissa Gorga

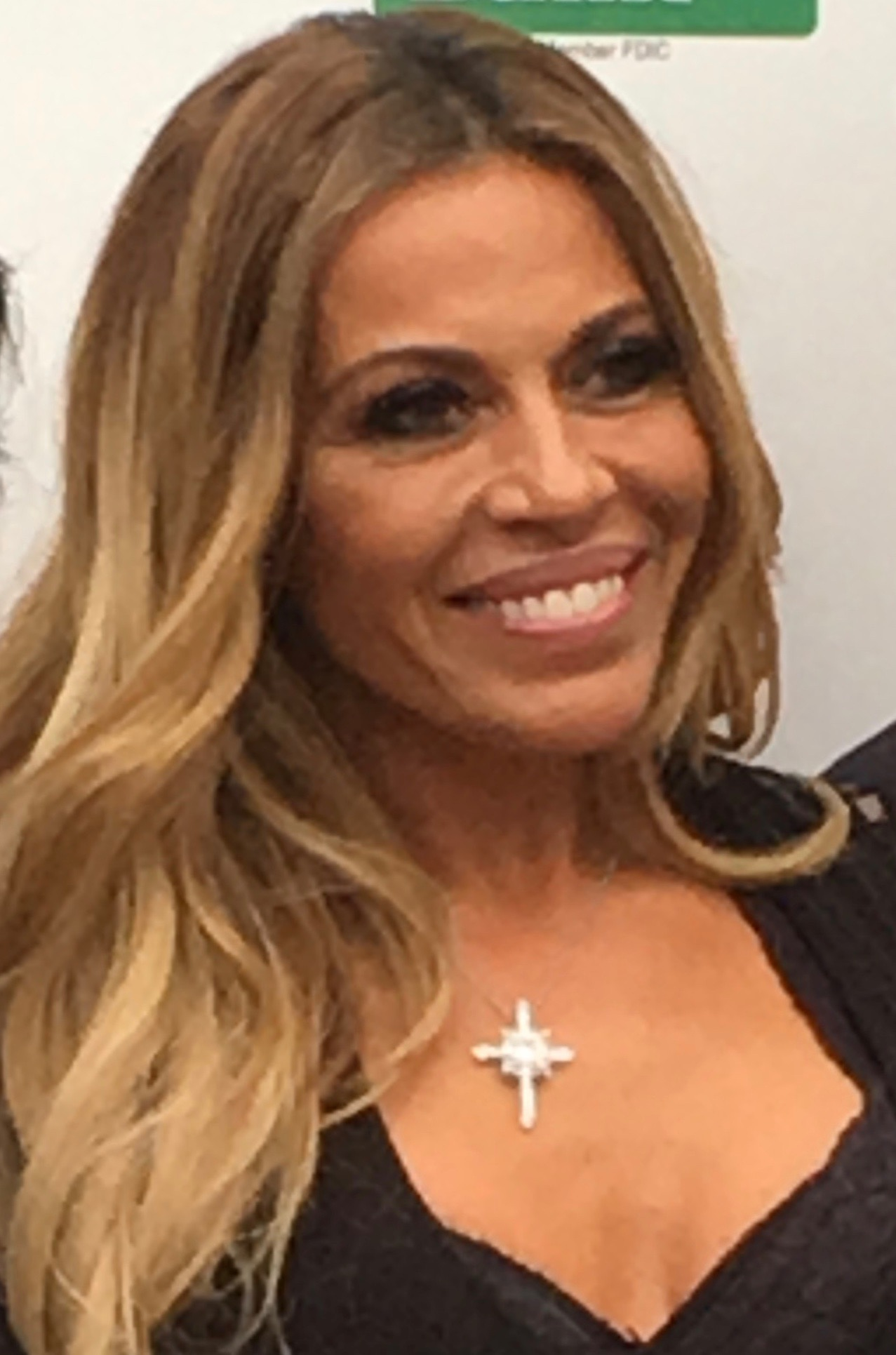
Dolores Catania

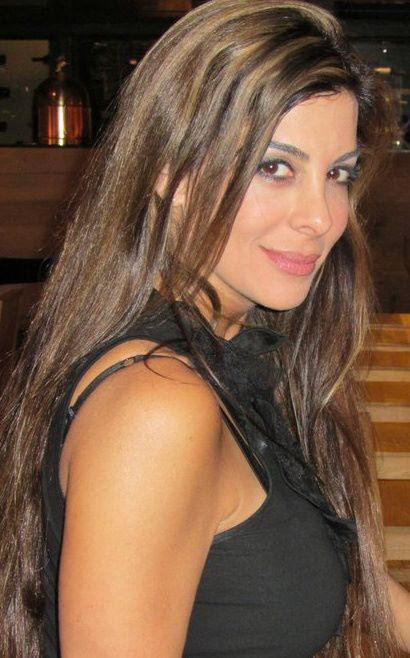
Siggy Flicker

Main cast members
Cast member	Seasons													
Cast member	1	2	3	4	5	6	7	8	9	10	11	12	13	14
Teresa Giudice	Main	Main	Main	Main	Main	Main	Main	Main	Main	Main	Main	Main	Main	Main
Jacqueline Laurita	Main	Main	Main	Main	Main	Friend	Main							
Caroline Manzo	Main	Main	Main	Main	Main									
Dina Manzo	Main	Main		Guest		Main								
Danielle Staub	Main	Main						Friend	Friend	Friend				
Melissa Gorga		Guest	Main	Main	Main	Main	Main	Main	Main	Main	Main	Main	Main	Main
Kathy Wakile		Guest	Main	Main	Main	Friend	Friend							
Teresa Aprea						Main	Guest							
Amber Marchese						Main								
Nicole Napolitano						Main	Guest							
Dolores Catania	Guest		Guest	Guest			Main	Main	Main	Main	Main	Main	Main	Main
Siggy Flicker							Main	Main						
Margaret Josephs								Main	Main	Main	Main	Main	Main	Main
Jennifer Aydin							Guest		Main	Main	Main	Main	Main	Main
Jackie Goldschneider									Main	Main	Main	Main	Friend	Friend
Danielle Cabral													Main	Main
Rachel Fuda													Main	Main
Friends of the housewives
Kim Granatell		Friend	Guest											
Kim DePaola		Guest	Guest	Friend	Friend		Guest	Guest						
Rosie Pierri			Guest	Guest	Guest	Guest	Friend							
Traci Johnson												Friend	Guest	
Jennifer Fessler								Guest					Friend	Friend

== Episodes ==
The Real Housewives of New Jersey episodes
Season	Episodes	Originally released		Average Viewers (millions)
Season	Episodes	First released	Last released	Average Viewers (millions)
1	10	May 12, 2009	July 9, 2009	2.25
2	18	May 3, 2010	September 6, 2010	2.74
3	21	May 16, 2011	October 23, 2011	2.66
4	24	April 22, 2012	October 21, 2012	2.66
5	22	June 2, 2013	October 20, 2013	2.29
6	19	July 13, 2014	November 20, 2014	1.86
7	18	July 10, 2016	November 13, 2016	1.54
8	16	October 4, 2017	January 31, 2018	1.24
9	18	November 7, 2018	March 6, 2019	1.22
10	19	November 6, 2019	March 18, 2020	1.18
11	15	February 17, 2021	May 26, 2021	1.05
12	16	February 1, 2022	May 17, 2022	1.04
13	19	February 7, 2023	June 13, 2023	0.93
14	14	May 5, 2024	August 11, 2024	0.73
15	TBA	January 19, 2027	TBA	TBA

== Broadcast history ==
The Real Housewives of New Jersey airs regularly on Bravo in the United States; most episodes are approximately forty-two minutes in length, and are broadcast in standard definition and high definition. Since its premiere, the series has alternated airing on Monday, Tuesday, Wednesday, Thursday, and Sunday evenings and has been frequently shifted between the 8:00, 9:00, and 10:00 PM timeslots.

== Spin-offs ==
The series' success has resulted in a development of spin-off series. Caroline Manzo's sons, Albie and Chris, had a web series spin-off alongside their roommate and friend Greg Bennett, Boys to Manzo, which premiered on May 30, 2011. Caroline Manzo moved on from the original show to her own spin-off, Manzo'd with Children, which premiered on October 5, 2014, on Bravo. It featured her daily life with her husband, sons and daughter and lasted for three seasons.

In October 2015, a three episode spin-off, Teresa Checks In, premiered. It followed the life of the Giudice family during Teresa's incarceration, including her nearly daily phone calls from prison, and featured Melissa Gorga and her husband, Joe, and Rosie Pierri.

In December 2018, an after-show featuring season 9's cast was released online through Bravo.com and YouTube. It featured their reactions to the most recent episode and thoughts on the season. An after-show for the tenth season started streaming online on December 11, 2019.

Giudice and Melissa Gorga starred in the first season of the Peacock spin-off, The Real Housewives Ultimate Girls Trip. They traveled to Turks and Caicos alongside several other Housewives cast members from other cities.

Teresa Gets Married, featuring the August 2022 nuptials of Giudice and Luis "Louie" Ruelas, aired on Bravo on May 23, 2023.
