= Kathy Wakile =

American reality television personality (born 1965)

- Born: Katherina Pierri; October 4, 1965 (age 61); Paterson, New Jersey, U.S.
- Occupations: Television personality, entrepreneur, pastry chef
- Years active: 2011–present
- Known for: Television personality; The Real Housewives of New Jersey on Bravo
- Spouse: Richard Wakile (m. 1993)
- Children: 2
- Relatives: Teresa Giudice (cousin); Gia Giudice (cousin once removed); Melissa Gorga (cousin-in-law)

Katherina Wakile (née Pierri; born October 4, 1965) is an American reality television personality. She starred in the Bravo series The Real Housewives of New Jersey, which features the lives of her and her family members.

== Early life ==
Wakile was born October 4, 1965, in New Jersey. She has a younger sister, Rosie, and three brothers.

Wakile resides in Franklin Lakes, New Jersey, with her husband of over 20 years, Richard "Rich" Wakile, an owner/operator of NJ gas stations, and their two children, Victoria (b. 1994) and Joseph (b. 1996). Kathy and Victoria frequently participate in events that raise awareness for brain cancer, an illness they take close to heart, as Victoria underwent two operations to remove a benign brain tumor.

== Career ==
Wakile joined the show's third season in May 2011. She was put in the middle of confrontations between her cousin Teresa Giudice and her cousin-in-law Melissa Gorga. Wakile's main storylines concern her kids growing up, her daughter’s health issues, and her wish to open a restaurant one day. In Season 3, Wakile feuded with Teresa and also had difficulties getting to know Caroline Manzo due to the latter’s allegiance with the former. In Season 4, Wakile's conflict with Teresa continues. Her sister Rosie, who is gay, has also been featured on the show and gained a following due to her story of being different and coming out. Wakile also appeared in the fifth season of the show and this season saw the repair of many friendships including the relationship between Wakile and Teresa. In May 2014, it was announced Wakile would not return for the series’ sixth season, but would make periodic appearances throughout. She was credited as a "Friend of the Housewives" for seasons 6 and 7.

Aside from appearing on the series, she has introduced three product lines since joining the show, including Dolci Della Dea, which includes a cannoli kit, Goddess Eye Jewelry, a jewelry line which gives portion of the sales to the National Brain Tumor Society, and Red Velvet Cosmo, a ready-to-pour cocktail. Red Velvet Cosmo is based on one of her favorite desserts, red velvet cake. The drink won a medal in a national tasting competition. Wakile has also written a cookbook Indulge: Delicious Little Desserts That Keep Life Real Sweet.

In May 2017, Wakile announced she would be opening up a restaurant in Bergen County, New Jersey, alongside her husband Rich. Titled Pizza Love, it will specialize in pizza, Italian and Mediterranean food, as well as desserts. It opened in September 2017.

== Bibliography ==
- Indulge: Delicious Little Desserts That Keep Life Real Sweet (St. Martin's Griffin, September 2, 2014) 978-1-250-05126-4
