= Jacqueline Laurita =

American television personality (born 1970)

- Born: Jacqueline Elizabeth Grippe; April 26, 1970 (age 56); Fort Monmouth, New Jersey, U.S.
- Other name: Jacqueline Holmes
- Occupations: Television personality; Activist
- Years active: 2009–present
- Spouses: Matt Holmes (m. 1989; div. 1992) Chris Laurita (m. 2001)
- Children: 3
- Relatives: Caroline Manzo (sister-in-law); Dina Cantin (sister-in-law)

Jacqueline Elizabeth Laurita (née Grippe; born April 26, 1970) is an American television personality and spokeswoman on autism issues, known for starring in The Real Housewives of New Jersey (2009–14, 2016).

== Career ==
Beginning in 2009, Laurita became an original cast member of The Real Housewives of New Jersey. Her husband, Chris Laurita, appeared on the show along with his two sisters, Dina Manzo and Caroline Manzo.

In 2014, Laurita departed the series; however, she made appearances throughout the season, before returning for Season 7. In April 2017, Laurita announced she would not be returning for good for the series' upcoming eighth season.

In addition to appearing on the series, she also appeared on Manzo'd with Children. She also had a small role in Bad Parents directed by Cathya Jentis. In 2016, Laurita co-wrote Get It!: The Busy Girl's Guide to Getting Your "It" Together: A Beauty, Style, and Wellness Book with Jenè Luciani.

She co-hosted a podcast, The LookOver Ladies, and is active in the autism community.

== Personal life ==
Laurita was born in Fort Monmouth, New Jersey. She is of Italian, specifically Sicilian, descent through her father and Austrian descent through her mother. She was married to Matt Holmes from 1989 to 1992 and shares a daughter, Ashlee (formerly Ashley), with him. She later married Chris Laurita and had two sons with him, Christopher "C.J." and Nicholas. Her son Nicholas, who was born just prior to filming of season two of the show, was diagnosed with autism in 2012. Her husband started a popcorn company, The Little Kernel, with profits donated to a foundation that provides resources to parents with children on the autism spectrum.

Laurita had considered leaving the show after her son's autism diagnosis in 2012 but decided to stay and use the platform to share information. "We wanted to raise awareness for autism and educate others about it," she said. "We also didn’t want anyone, including our son, Nicholas, to think we backed out because we were ashamed of his diagnosis or trying to hide it.”

Laurita's first grandchild, Cameron Hendrix Malleo, was born on August 30, 2016, to Laurita's daughter, Ashlee Holmes, and Pete Malleo. Holmes married Malleo in August 2018 and they divorced in 2022.

In 2019, Laurita moved back to Las Vegas with her husband and their two sons. In 2023, they moved to Orange County, California as Chris Laurita expanded his business, Velocity Global Brand apparel company.
