= Manzo'd with Children =

American reality television series

- Genre: Reality television
- Starring: Caroline Manzo; Albert Manzo; Albie Manzo; Lauren Manzo; Chris Manzo
- Country of origin: United States
- Original language: English
- No. of seasons: 3
- No. of episodes: 30 (list of episodes)

Production
- Executive producers: Lucilla D’Agostino; Valerie Haselton; Rebecca Toth Dielenbach; Caroline Self; Brandon Panaligan
- Camera setup: Multiple
- Running time: 22 minutes
- Production company: Sirens Media

Original release
- Network: Bravo
- Release: October 5, 2014 – October 30, 2016

Related
- The Real Housewives of New Jersey; Boys to Manzo

Manzo'd with Children is an American reality television series on Bravo which premiered on October 5, 2014. Bravo announced the series in April 2014, making it the first spin-off show of The Real Housewives of New Jersey. The first season concluded on November 2, 2014.

In February 2017, it was announced the series would not return for a fourth season.

== Background ==
The Manzo family: Chris, Albie, Caroline, Al and Lauren. (from left)

The reality series followed the daily life of Caroline Manzo and her family: husband Albert, sons Albie and Chris, daughter Lauren and sister Fran. Caroline spent five seasons being a cast member of popular reality television series The Real Housewives of New Jersey before getting her own show. Manzo decided to quit the series before the sixth season. In October 2013, she explained the decision on her personal blog telling that her "role has run its course," adding that "peace and integrity cannot be bought with money or fame." Manzo also added that she was already in production on a pilot, Manzo'd With Children; the show was eventually picked up.

In March 2015, Bravo renewed Manzo'd with Children for a second season, which premiered on August 16, 2015. In April 2016, the series was renewed for a third season, which premiered on September 11, 2016.

== Cast ==
- Caroline Manzo, former The Real Housewives of New Jersey cast member. She has been married to Albert for more than 30 years.
- Albert "Al" Manzo, Caroline's husband. He runs The Brownstone, a catering facility in Paterson, New Jersey, a family business that he has been handling for nearly 35 years.
- Albie Manzo, the oldest of the Manzo children. Albie and his brother, Chris, are partners and co-founders of BLK beverages since its debut in 2011. Their business has expanded to numerous major stores across the country. Albie owns Little Town New Jersey Restaurant located in Hoboken, which is now closed.
- Lauren Manzo, Al and Caroline's only daughter. She runs her beauty bar, Cafface. Lauren became engaged to her fiancé Vito Scalia in November 2013. The two were married on July 18, 2015. In September 2016, the two announced they were expecting a child, On February 24, 2017, Manzo gave birth to a girl, Marchesa. In October 2023, it was announced Manzo and Scalia had filed for divorce.
- Chris Manzo, the youngest of the Manzo children. He works together with his brother on BLK beverages as well as their restaurant, Little Town New Jersey. He is the creator of the family's favorite pastime, the Ham Game.

== Episodes ==
Season	Episodes	Originally released	
Season	Episodes	First released	Last released
1	8	October 5, 2014	December 7, 2014
2	12	August 16, 2015	October 18, 2015
3	10	September 11, 2016	October 30, 2016
