= Caroline Manzo =

American television personality

- Born: Caroline Laurita; August 23, 1961 (age 64); Brooklyn, New York City, New York, U.S.
- Occupations: Television personality; businesswoman
- Years active: 2009–2016
- Spouse: Albert Manzo III (m. 1984)
- Children: 3
- Relatives: Chris Laurita (brother); Dina Manzo (sister); Jacqueline Laurita (sister-in-law)
- Website: http://www.carolinemanzo.com/

Caroline Manzo (née Laurita; born August 23, 1961) is an American reality television personality and businesswoman. She is best known for starring in the reality television series The Real Housewives of New Jersey, and her own spin-off show, Manzo'd with Children.

== Career ==
Manzo first appeared on the first season of Bravo's The Real Housewives of New Jersey in 2009. Her sister, Dina Manzo (now Dina Cantin), and sister-in-law, Jacqueline Laurita, were also cast members when the show first aired. Manzo departed The Real Housewives after its fifth season and began filming a spin-off series about her family called Manzo'd with Children. The show premiered on October 5, 2014, on Bravo; it attracted over 1.7 million viewers. In March 2015, Bravo renewed Manzo'd with Children for a second season. In April 2016, it was renewed for a third season. In February 2017, it was announced the series would not return for a fourth season.

Manzo has written a book entitled Let Me Tell You Something, which was released on December 1, 2013, by HarperCollins. She wrote another book Food and Other Things I Love: More Than 100 Italian American Recipes from My Family to Yours released in September 2024, by Chronicle Books.

Manzo was offered a part-time role on the tenth season of The Real Housewives of New Jersey, but turned it down, finding the offer "insulting". In 2022, Manzo confirmed that she was asked to return for the thirteenth season of The Real Housewives of New Jersey as a full-time housewife, but once again declined the offer.

In January 2023, it was announced that Manzo would appear on the upcoming fifth season of The Real Housewives Ultimate Girls Trip, filming in Morocco and set to premiere in 2024. She would exit the show earlier following a moment that involved Brandi Glanville "forcibly kissing" her.

== Lawsuit against Bravo ==
In January 2024, Manzo filed a lawsuit against Bravo, alleging that the network and its affiliated companies—Forest Productions, Warner Bros. Entertainment, NBCUniversal Media, Shed Media and Peacock TV— would "regularly ply the Real Housewives cast with alcohol, cause them to become severely intoxicated, and then direct, encourage and/or allow them to sexually harass other cast members because that is good for ratings." She also alleged the January 2023 incident with Glanville also involved Glanville giving her unwanted kisses, but also touching her thigh and "forcibly fondled" her vagina and breasts upon confronting her in a bathroom.

== Personal life ==
Manzo is married to Albert Manzo, co-owner of The Brownstone, an event and catering facility in Paterson, New Jersey. The couple have three children: Albert "Albie" (b. 1986), Lauren Michele (b. 1988), and Christopher Thomas (b. 1989).

Manzo's husband Albert and his brother, Dina Cantin's ex-husband Tommy Manzo, inherited The Brownstone from their father, Albert "Tiny" Manzo. The Brownstone was used as a location on The Sopranos.

Manzo has been a resident of Franklin Lakes, New Jersey.

Manzo's first grandchild, Marchesa Anna Scalia, was born to her daughter, Lauren, and then son-in-law, Vito Scalia (the best friend of Albie Manzo), on February 24, 2017.
