= C7H10N2 =

The molecular formula C_{7}H_{10}N_{2} may refer to:

- Diaminotoluenes
  - 2,4-Diaminotoluene
  - 2,5-Diaminotoluene
- 4-Dimethylaminopyridine
- 2-Pyridylethylamine
- 2,3,5-Trimethylpyrazine
