= Aromatic amine =

Organic compound made of an aromatic ring bound to an amine

In organic chemistry, an aromatic amine is an organic compound consisting of an aromatic ring attached to an amine. It is a broad class of compounds that encompasses anilines, but also many more complex aromatic rings and many amine substituents beyond NH_{2}. Such compounds occur widely.

Representative aromatic amines
Aromatic ring	Name of parent amines	Example
benzene	aniline	substituted anilines
benzene	phenylenediamines	the antioxidant p-phenylenediamine
toluene	toluidines	the pharmaceutical prilocain
toluene	diaminotoluenes	the hair dye ingredient 2,5-diaminotoluene
naphthalene	naphthylamines	the dyes Congo red and Prodan
pyridine	aminopyridines	the drug tenoxicam
pyrimidine	aminopyrimidines	the nucleobase cytosine
quinoline	aminoquinolines	the drug primaquine
purine	aminopurines	the nucleobase guanine
acridine	aminoacridines	fluorescent dyes

Aromatic amines are widely used as precursor to pesticides, pharmaceuticals, and dyes.

== Aromatic amines in textiles ==
Since August 2012, the new standard EN 14362-1:2012 Textiles - Methods for determination of certain aromatic amines derived from azo colorants - Part 1: Detection of the use of certain azo colorants accessible with and without extracting the fibres is effective. It had been officially approved by the European Committee for Standardization (CEN) and supersedes the test standards EN 14362-1: 2003 and EN 14362-2: 2003.

The standard describes a procedure to detect EU banned aromatic amines derived from azo colorants in textile fibres, including natural, man-made, regenerated, and blended fibres. The standard is also relevant for all coloured textiles, e.g. dyed, printed, and coated textiles.

== See also ==
- Aromatic hydrocarbons
