= Hair coloring =

Practice of changing the hair color

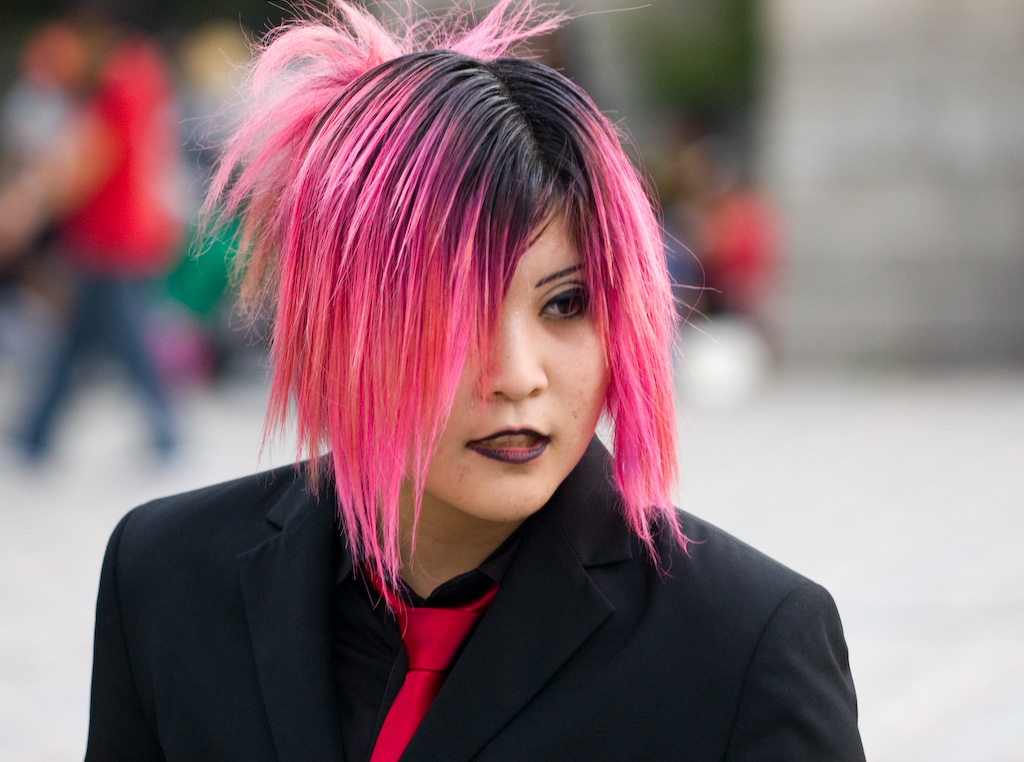
A woman with dyed pink hair

Hair coloring, or hair dyeing, is the practice of changing the color of the hair on humans' heads. The main reasons for this are usually cosmetic: to cover gray or white hair, to alter hair to create a specific look, to change a color to suit preference or to restore the original hair color after it has been discolored by hairdressing processes or sun bleaching.

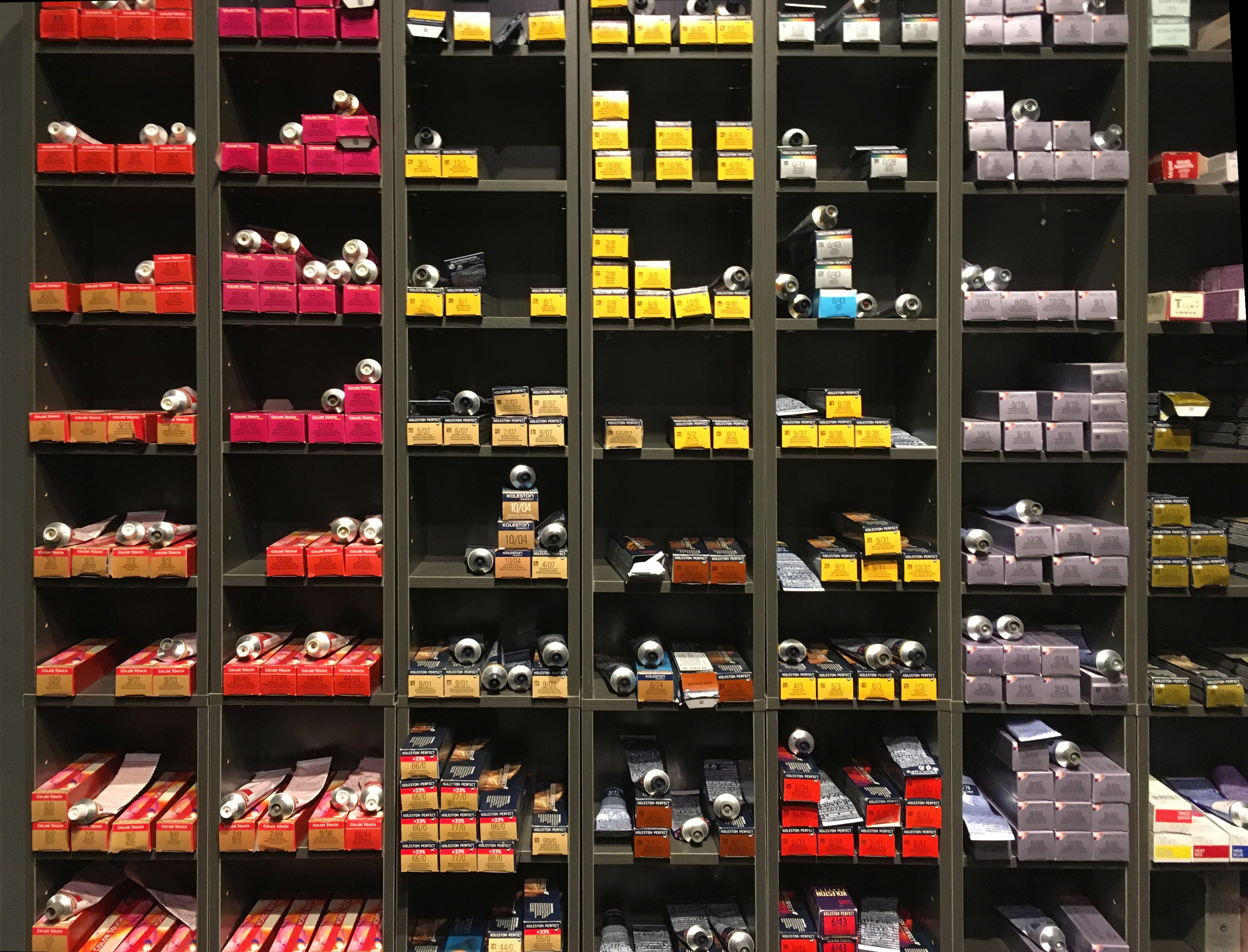
Shelf with a great number of different hair colours, each having a colour code printed on the packaging, at a hairdresser's salon in Germany

Hair coloring can be done professionally by a hairdresser or independently at home. Hair coloring is very popular, with 50 – 80% of women in the United States, Europe, and Japan having reported using hair dye. At-home coloring in the United States reached sales of $4.8 billion in 2024 and is expected to rise to $8.2 billion by 2033.

== History ==
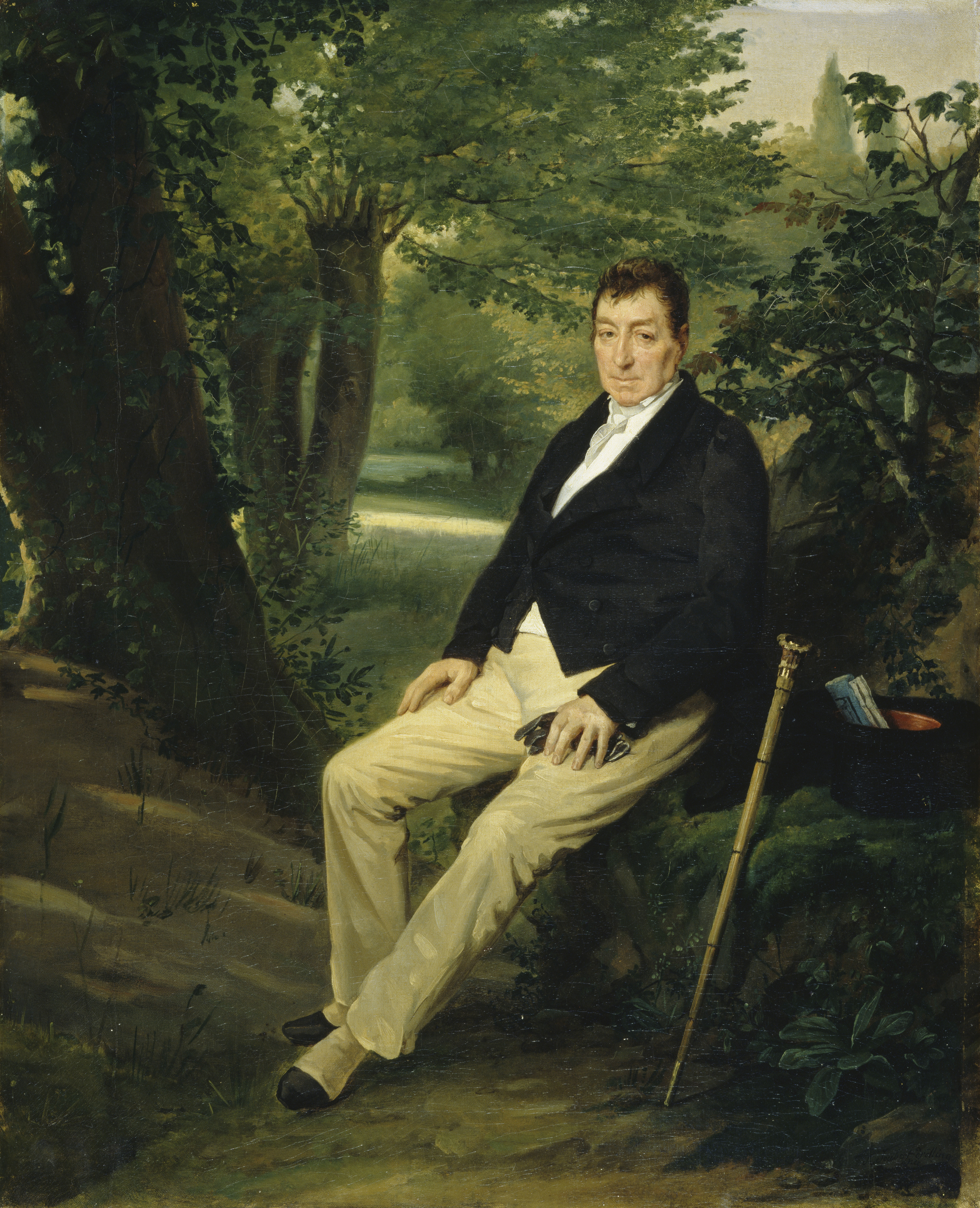
Lafayette in 1830, aged 73, with pitch-black hair (painting by Louise-Adéone Drölling)

The dyeing of hair is an ancient art that involves treatment of the hair with various chemical compounds. Assyrian herbals dating back to 2177 BCE contain some of the oldest recipes for cosmetic preparations known, including hair dye. The ancient Egyptian Ebers Papyrus, c. 1550 BCE, has recipes for dyeing gray hair and eyebrows. Assyrian clay tablets dated to the 7th century BCE mention using the gall of a black ox, cypress oil, licorice, and honey to turn gray hair black. In ancient times, the dyes were frequently obtained from plants. Some of the most well known are henna (Lawsonia inermis), indigo dye, Cassia obovata, senna, turmeric, and amla. Others include katam (buxus dioica), black walnut hulls, red ochre, and leeks.

Diodorus Siculus, a Greek historian, described in detail how Celtic people dyed their hair blonde: "Their aspect is terrifying. They are very tall in stature, with rippling muscles under clear white skin. Their hair is blond, but not naturally so: they bleach it, to this day, artificially, washing it in lime and combing it back from their foreheads. They look like wood-demons, their hair thick and shaggy like a horse's mane. Some of them are clean-shaven, but others — especially those of high rank — shave their cheeks but leave a moustache that covers the whole mouth."

Hair coloring recipes were common in the medieval period and Renaissance. Trotula's De ornatu mulierum ("On Women's Cosmetics"), from the 12th century, has multiple recipes for bleaching and coloring hair. In the 1661 book Eighteen Books of the Secrets of Art & Nature, various methods of coloring hair black, gold, green, red, yellow, and white are explained. In 1856, English chemist William Henry Perkin accidentally discovered the first synthetic dye, mauveine, while attempting to synthesize quinine, a treatment for malaria. His discovery marked the beginning of the synthetic dye industry and laid the groundwork for later innovations in hair dye chemistry. The development of synthetic dyes for hair is traced to the 1860s discovery of the reactivity of para-phenylenediamine (PPD) with air. Eugène Schueller, the founder of L'Oréal, is recognized for creating the first synthetic hair dye in 1907. In 1947 the German cosmetics firm Schwarzkopf launched the first home color product, "Poly Color". Hair dyeing is now a multibillion-dollar industry that involves the use of both plant-derived and synthetic dyes.

== Application techniques ==
All coloring techniques can be used with any type of color. For lightening, the hair has to be bleached.

=== Off-scalp ===
Hair color was traditionally applied to the hair as one overall color. The modern trend is to use several colors to produce streaks or gradations. These are referred to as:

- Highlighting, where sections of hair are treated with lighteners
- Lowlighting, where sections of hair are treated with darker hair colors
- Splashlighting, a horizontal band of bleached hair from ear to ear

There are also newer coloring techniques such as ombré, shatush, balayage, and airtouch, in which hair is dark on the crown and bit by bit becomes lighter toward the ends.

These are off-the-scalp techniques, and can be applied by the following methods:

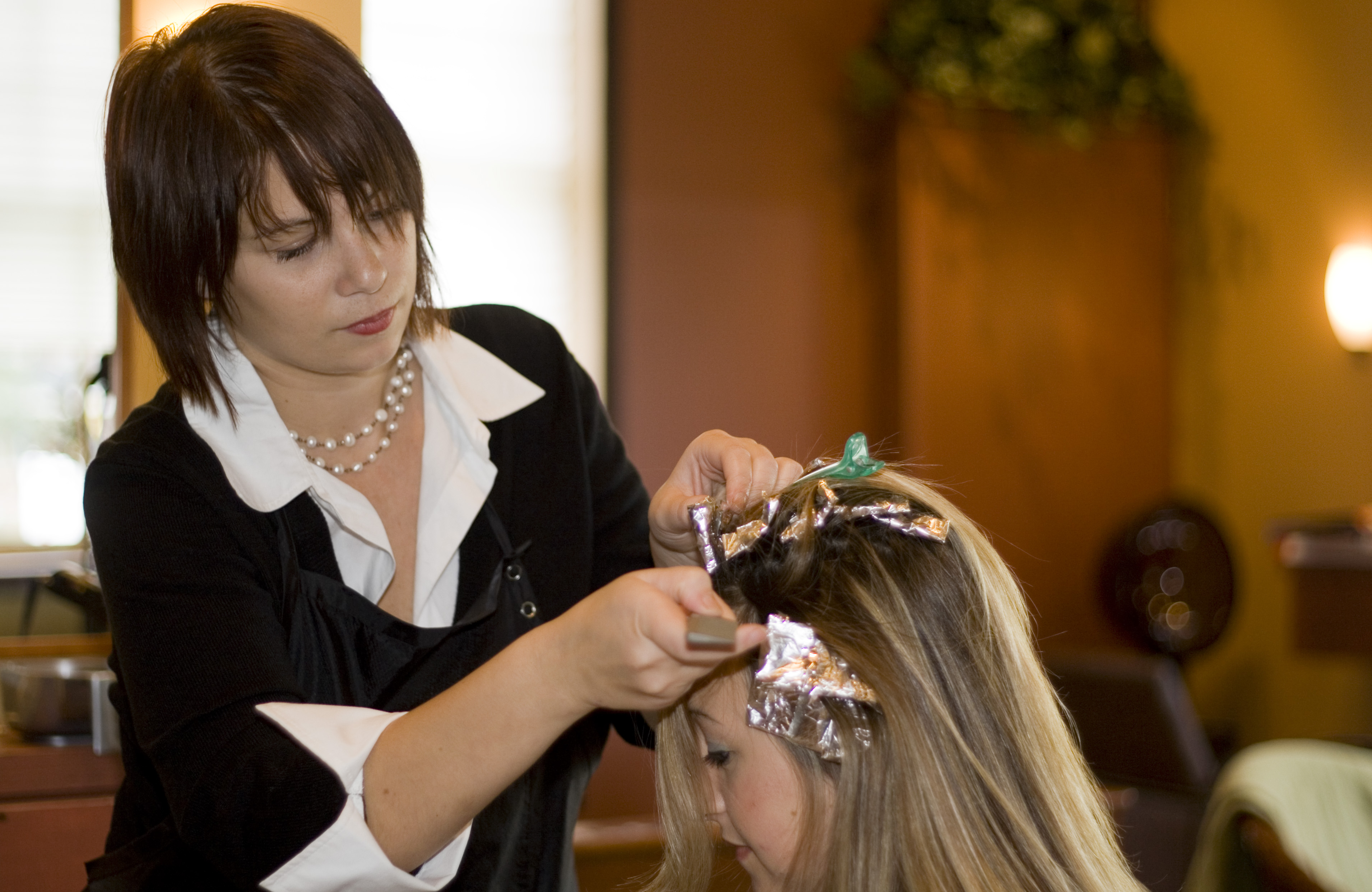
A hairdresser colors parts of a client's hair by foiling

- Foiling, where pieces of foil or plastic film are used to separate the hair to be colored. Employed especially when more than one color is to be applied, this method ensures that only the desired hair strands are colored, and the rest spared.
- Cap, when a plastic cap is placed tightly on the head and strands are pulled through with a hook, a method infrequently practiced other than for applying highlights to short hair.
- Balayage, where hair color is painted directly onto sections of the hair with no foils used to keep the color contained, a method growing in popularity due to its observed effect of appearing more natural. The difference between balayage and ombré is that a balayage requires more precise hand-painting sections of hair and typically costs more.
- Baby lights, very thin highlights that are created by using a fine color technique, baby light results are very natural and subtle.
- Dipping or tip dyeing, where tips of the hair are dipped directly into dye.

=== On-scalp ===
Hair coloring can also be applied on the scalp for a more solid level of coverage.

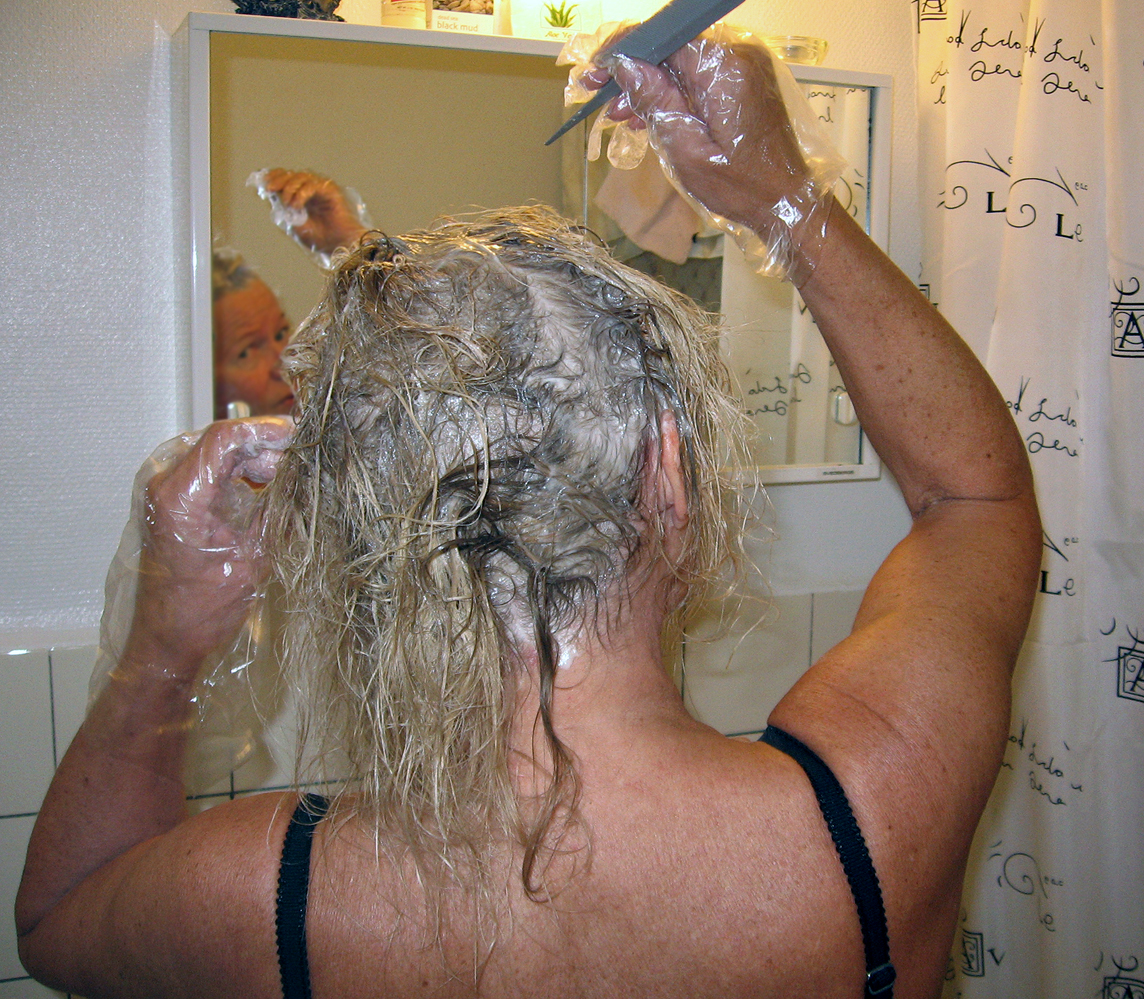
A woman dyeing or bleaching her hair using an on-scalp method

- All-over color, where the person wants all of their hair to be a different solid color
- Root touch-up, where color is applied only to the most recent section of re-growth, usually the first inch of hair nearest the scalp. Root touch-ups are repeated every 4 to 6 weeks as the natural color grows in and becomes apparent. People who color their hair to disguise gray often have root touch-ups.
- Block coloring, where the person wants two or more colors applied to their hair, resulting in dimension and contrast

== Synthetic dyes ==
The four most common classifications are permanent, demi-permanent (sometimes called deposit only), semi-permanent, and temporary.

=== Permanent synthetic dyes ===
Permanent hair color generally contains ammonia and must be mixed with a developer or oxidizing agent in order to permanently change hair color. Ammonia is used in permanent hair color to open the cuticle layer so that the developer and colorants together can penetrate into the cortex. The developer, or oxidizing agent, comes in various volumes. The higher the developer volume, the higher the "lift" will be of a person's natural hair pigment. Someone with dark hair wishing to achieve two or three shades lighter may need a higher developer whereas someone with lighter hair wishing to achieve darker hair will not need one as high. Timing may vary with permanent hair coloring but is typically 30 minutes or 45 minutes for those wishing to achieve maximum color change.

=== Demi-permanent synthetic dyes ===
Demi-permanent is hair coloring that contains an alkaline agent (e.g. ethanolamine, sodium carbonate) other than ammonia, and while always employed with a developer, the concentration of hydrogen peroxide in that developer may be lower than used with a permanent hair color. These products provide almost no lightening of hair's color during dyeing, since the alkaline agents employed in demi-permanent colors are less effective in removing the natural pigment of hair than ammonia. As the result, they cannot color hair to a lighter shade than it was before dyeing and are less damaging to hair than their permanent counterpart.

Demi-permanents are much more effective at covering gray hair than semi-permanents, but less so than permanents.

Demi-permanents have several advantages as compared with permanent color. Because there is essentially no lifting (i.e., removal) of natural hair color, the final color is less uniform/homogeneous than a permanent and therefore more natural looking; they are gentler on hair and therefore safer, especially for damaged hair; and they wash out over time (typically 20 to 28 shampoos), so root regrowth is less noticeable and if a change of color is desired, it is easier to achieve. Demi-permanent hair colors are not permanent but the darker shades in particular may persist longer than indicated on the packet.

=== Semi-permanent synthetic dyes ===
Semi-permanent hair coloring cannot lighten the hair either. Because it involves no developer (hydrogen peroxide) or ammonia, it is thus less damaging to hair strands than their demi-permanent counterpart.

There will be subtle variations in shade across the entire head, because of hair's color and porosity along the length of a hair strand. The final color of each strand of hair will depend on its original color and porosity. This variation gives a more natural looking result than the solid all over color of a permanent. Because gray or white hairs have a different starting color than other hair, they will not appear as the same shade as the rest of the hair when treated with semi-permanent color. If there are only minimal grey or white hairs, the effect will usually be enough for them to blend in, but as the gray spreads, there will come a point where it will not be disguised as well. In this case, the move to demi-permanent as a base can be used sometimes for adding highlights, to delay permanent coloring.

Semi-permanent hair color uses compounds of lower molecular weight than are found in temporary hair color dyes. These dyes are only able to wedge under the cuticle layer of the hair shaft; for this reason, the color will survive limited washing — typically 4 to 8 shampoos.

Semi-permanents may still contain the suspected carcinogen p-phenylenediamine (PPD) or other related colorant carcinogens. The U.S. Environmental Protection Agency reported chronic exposure to PPD in the diet of rats and mice depressed body weight of the animals, with no other clinical signs of toxicity observed in several studies.

== Temporary color ==
Temporary hair color is available in various forms including rinses, shampoos, gels, sprays, and foams. Temporary hair color is typically brighter and more vibrant than semi-permanent and permanent hair color. It is most often used to color hair for special occasions such as Christmas and Halloween costume parties.

The pigments in temporary hair color cannot penetrate the cuticle layer of the hair. The color particles remain adsorbed (closely adherent) to the surface of the hair shaft and are easily removed with a single shampooing. Temporary hair color can persist on hair that is excessively dry or damaged in a way that allows for migration of the pigment to the interior of the hair shaft.

== Plant-based dyes ==
Indigo is natural dye from a plant (Indigofera tinctoria, I. suffructicosa, or I. arrecta) that can be used to dye hair. It is generally applied in a leuco (colorless) form.

Beetroot juice has been known to be employed for temporary coloring.

In 2018, a system for making semi-permanent hair dyes from renewable waste blackcurrant (Ribes nigrum L.) fruit skins from the fruit pressing industry was developed. Anthocyanin pigments were extracted from the blackcurrant skin waste and formulated into hair dyes. The dyes showed high buildup on hair and gave an intense blue color, which was stable to multiple washes.

== Alternative color ==
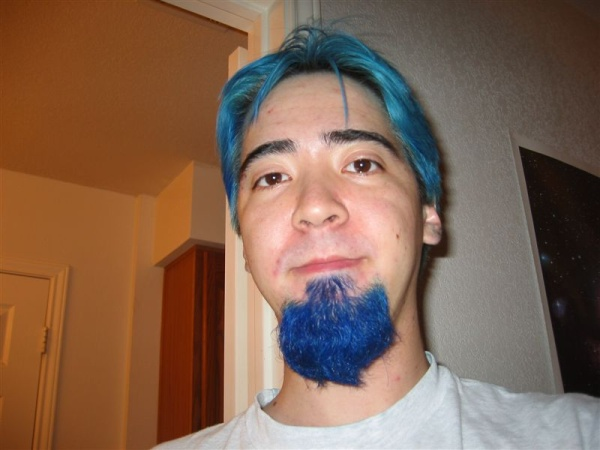
A person with their hair and beard colored blue

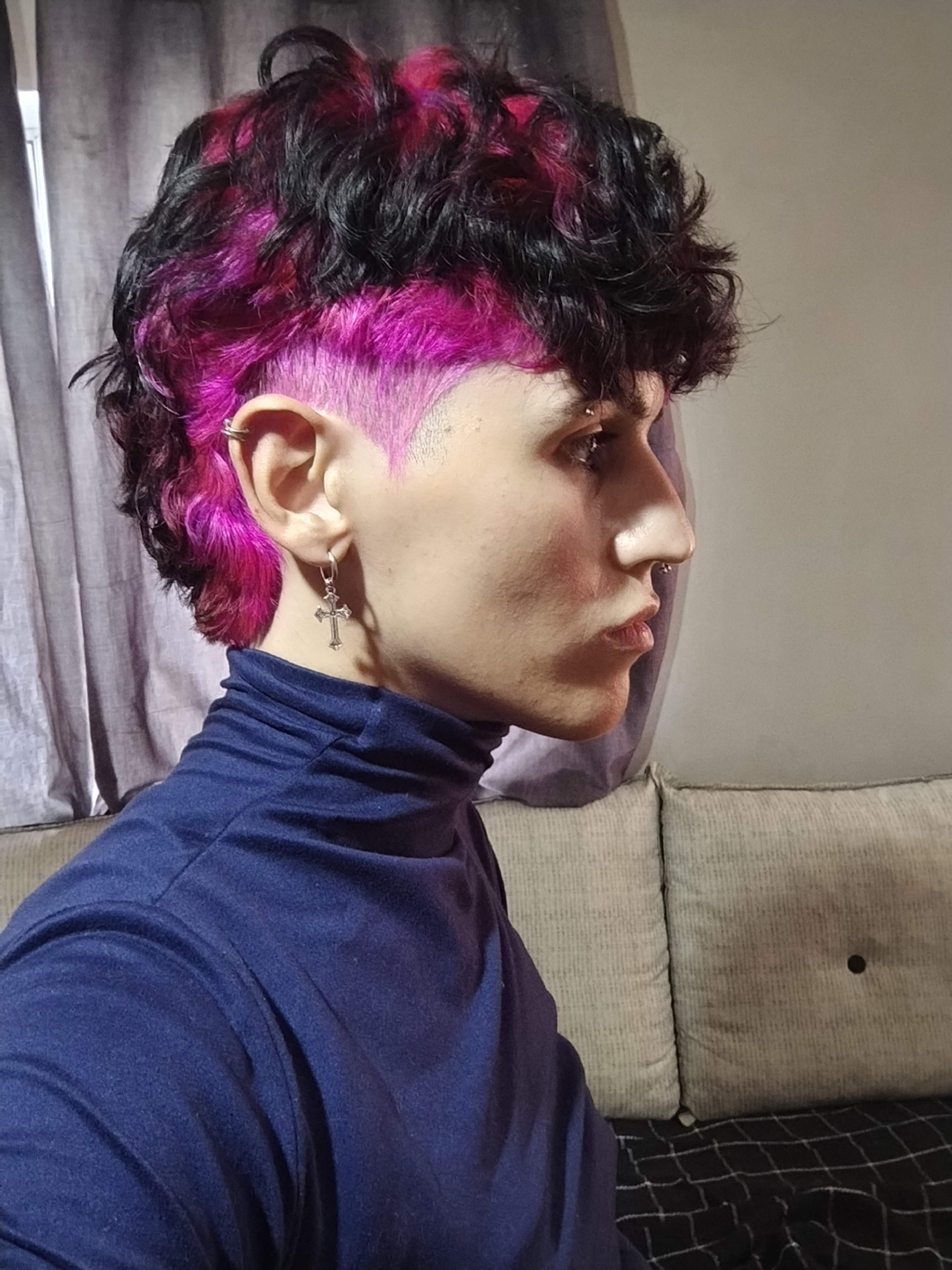
A person with pink ghost roots

Alternative hair coloring products are designed to create hair colors not typically found in nature. These are also referred to as "vivid color" in the hairstyling industry. The available colors are diverse, such as the colors green and fuchsia. Permanent alternatives in some colors are available. More recently, blacklight-reactive hair dyes have been brought to market that fluoresce under blacklights, such as those often used at nightclubs.

The chemical formulae of alternative color dyes typically contain only tint and have no developer. This means that they will only create the bright color of the packet if they are applied to light blond hair. Darker hair (medium brown to black) would need to be bleached in order for these pigment applications to take to the hair desirably. Some types of fair hair may also take vivid colors more fully after bleaching. Gold, yellow and orange undertones in hair that has not been lightened enough can muddy the final hair color, especially with pink, blue and green dyes. Although some alternative colors are semi-permanent, such as blue and purple, it could take several months to fully wash the color from bleached or pre-lightened hair.

== Hair bleaching ==
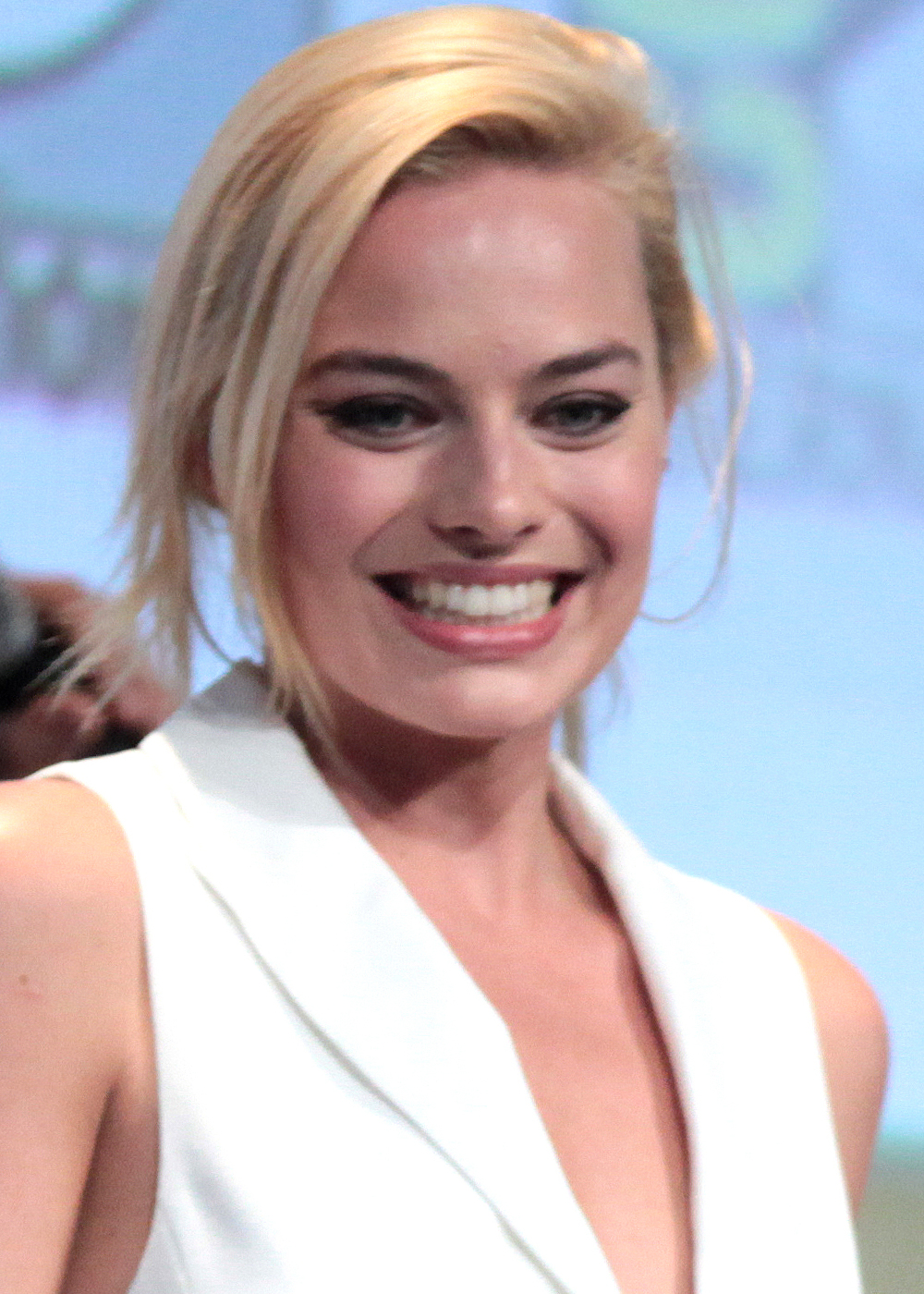
Actress Margot Robbie with bleached blond hair

Hair is given a lighter color by bleaching it. Melanin pigments, which give hair a darker color, can be broken down with oxidation. The oxidizing agent used to bleach hair is hydrogen peroxide. It is mixed with ammonia to create an alkaline solution and to speed up the reaction. When melanin is oxidized, oxygen gas is released.

Products for bleaching one's hair at home usually contain a 6% solution of hydrogen peroxide, while products for use in a hair salon can contain up to 12%.

Peroxide bleached hair can have undesirable brassy or yellow hue. A product known as a toner is used to slightly alter the hair color's undertones. Purple shampoo (shampoo with purple coloring agents) can also be used to counteract brassy undertones.

== Adverse effects ==
Phenylenediamine based hair dyes have been controversial and subject of many studies. Several products have been removed from the marketplace over the past decades.

Hair coloring can involve the use of chemicals capable of removing, replacing, and/or covering up pigments naturally found inside the hair shaft. Use of these chemicals can result in a range of adverse effects, including temporary skin irritation and allergy, hair breakage, skin discoloration and unexpected hair color results. According to the International Agency for Research on Cancer (IARC), in vitro and in vivo studies (in exposed human populations) have shown that some hair dyes and many chemicals used in the hair dyeing process can be considered mutagenic and carcinogenic.

=== Skin irritation and allergy ===
In certain individuals, the use of hair coloring can result in allergic reactions and/or skin irritation. Individuals allergic to gluten for example, will need to be cautious when purchasing hair color since certain hair dye includes gluten. Gluten does not need to be ingested for it to cause an allergy. Skin contact with gluten may cause a reaction and can therefore lead to sensitisation (i.e., allergy). Symptoms of these reactions can include redness, sores, itching, burning sensation and discomfort. Symptoms will sometimes not be apparent immediately following the application and processing of the tint, but can also arise after hours or even a day later.

To help prevent or limit allergic reactions, the majority of hair color products recommend that the client conduct a patch test before using the product. This involves mixing a small quantity of tint preparation and applying it directly to the skin for a period of 48 hours. If irritation develops, manufacturers recommend that the client not use the product. European dermatologists have, however, strongly advised against such pre-use testing, as it entails additional sensitisation (allergy) risk and the interpretation by lay people may not be sufficiently accurate.

=== Skin discoloration ===
Skin and fingernails are made of a similar type of keratinized protein as hair. That means that drips, slips and extra hair tint around the hairline can result in patches of discolored skin. This is more common with darker hair colors and persons with dry absorbent skin. That is why it is recommended that latex or nitrile gloves be worn to protect the hands.

This discoloration will disappear as the skin naturally renews itself and the top layer of skin is removed (typically takes a few days or at most a week). Ways of preventing skin discoloration are to wear latex or nitrile gloves to protect the hands and also by applying a thin layer of petroleum jelly or oil-based preparation around the hairline. Gentle abrasives such as moist baking soda or a small amount of toothpaste applied with a toothbrush may also help remove the uppermost layer of skin and dye (neither removes just the dye). Acetone and nail polish remover are not considered effective; laundry detergent may sometimes work as may moist cigarette ash rubbed into the stained area.

=== Health concerns ===
- The salt lead acetate (formerly the active ingredient in gradual darkening products such as Grecian formula) is toxic. Lead acetate trihydrate has also been shown to cause reproductive toxicity.
- Articles link the development of some forms of cancer (including leukemia, non-Hodgkin's lymphoma, bladder cancer, blood cancer, and multiple myeloma) with use of hair color. More specifically, prolonged use of permanent dark hair dyes can double a person's risk of getting some types of blood cancer.
- In 2004 a known human carcinogen, 4-aminobiphenyl or 4-ABP, was found in some commercial hair dyes. However, evidence is limited and inconsistent for the link between cancer from hair dye.
- Phenylenediamine is known to cause health concerns, such as skin irritation. Exposure to phenylenediamine can occur during manufacturing or during the use of hair dyes. According to the Product Safety Summary Sheet by DuPont, Para-Phenylenediamine (PPD) is labeled as toxic and can cause adverse effects on aquatic organisms and could cause long-term effects in aquatic environments.

In October 2017, the leading breast surgeon Professor Kefah Mokbel published a meta-analysis showing that use of hair dyes might increase the risk of developing breast cancer by 20% among users. Another 2019 study found similar results.

== Chemistry of synthetic permanent hair coloring ==
Synthetic permanent hair coloring requires three components: 1,4-diaminobenzene (historically) or 2,5-diaminotoluene (currently), a coupling agent, and an oxidant. The process is typically performed under basic conditions. The mechanism of oxidation dyes involves three steps:

1. Oxidation of 1,4-diaminobenzene derivative to the quinone state.
2. Reaction of this diimine with a coupler compound (more detail below).
3. Oxidation of the resulting compound to give the final dye.

The preparation (dye precursors) is in the leuco (colorless) form. Oxidizing agents are usually hydrogen peroxide, and the alkaline environment is usually provided by ammonia. The combination of hydrogen peroxide and ammonia causes the natural hair to be lightened, providing a "blank canvas" for the dye. Ammonia opens the hair shaft pores so that the dye can actually diffuse inside the fiber. These dye intermediates and coupler compounds can undergo oxidation and coupling reaction as shown in the scheme below to form high molecular weight products, which are trapped in the hair matrix and cannot be readily removed through washing.

Various combinations of primary intermediates and coupler compounds provide a spectrum of shades of hair colors. The primary intermediates are aromatic para compounds, such as 1,4-diaminobenzene or 4-aminophenol. The coupler compounds (couplers) are meta-substituted derivatives of aniline. They come in three major classes based on the color that they produce when they react with the primary intermediate.

Couplers are chemical compounds that define the color of the hair dye. Shown here are three red couplers (A, B, C), two yellow-green couplers (D, E) and a blue coupler (F).

- Blue couplers include 1,3-diaminobenzene and its derivatives.
- Red couplers include phenols and naphthols, such as 3-aminophenol (CAS#591-27-5), 5-amino-2-methylphenol (CAS#2835-95-2) and 1-naphthol (CAS#90-15-3). The combination of 2,5-diaminotoluene with the coupler 3-aminophenol gives a magenta-brown dye, while the combination of 2,5-diaminotoluene with the coupler 1-naphthol gives a purple dye.
- Yellow-green couplers include resorcinol, 4-chlororesorcinol, and benzodioxoles. These compounds produce broad-band absorption when they react to form dyes, allowing for more natural-looking hair colors. The combination of 2,5-diaminotoluene with the coupler resorcinol gives a greenish brown dye.

The first step shows the oxidation of p-phenylenediamine to the quinonediimine (C_{6}H_{4}(NH)_{2}):

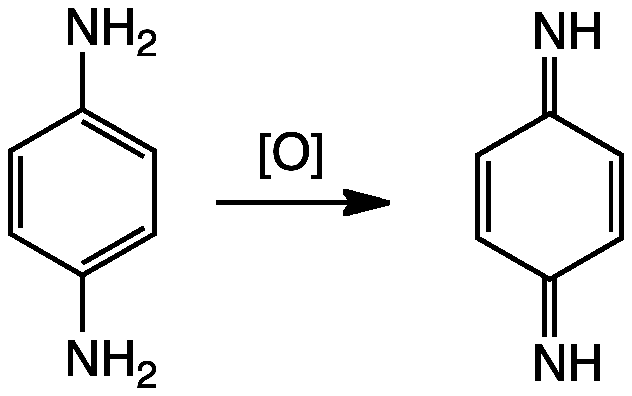

This species exists in equilibrium with the monoprotonated form (C_{6}H_{4}(NH)(NH_{2})^{+}) (not shown). The second step involves the attack of this quinonediimine on the coupler. In organic chemistry, this reaction is called electrophilic aromatic substitution:

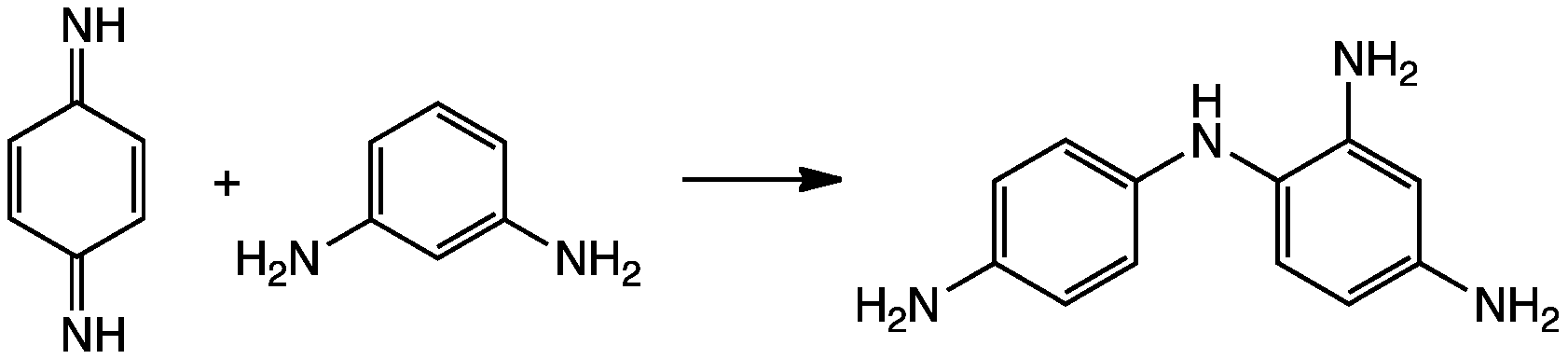

In the third and final step, the product from the quinonediimine-coupler reaction oxidizes to the final hair dye.

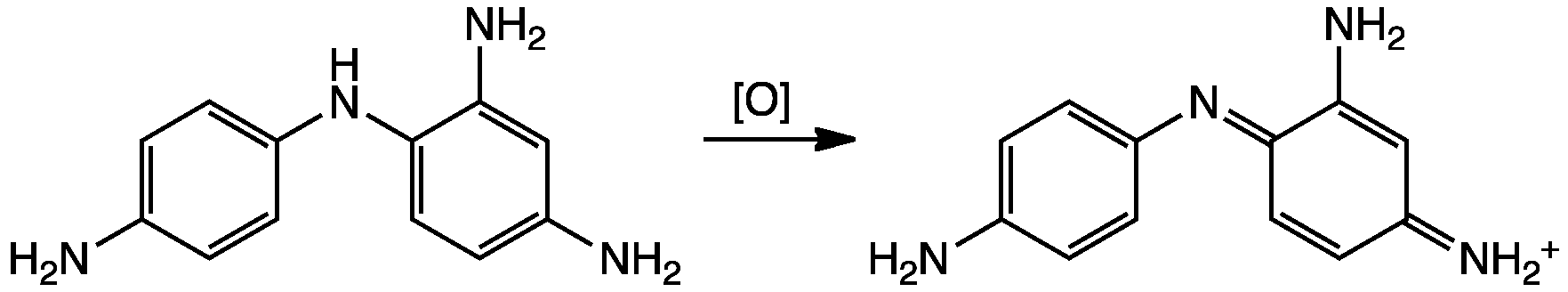

It was once believed that the dye forms in the above reaction bond to hair permanently. It was later shown that the main reason that this reaction imparts a permanent color on hair is that it produces larger dye molecules, which are locked inside the hair.

== Legal restrictions ==
Hair dyes are cosmetic compounds that make contact with the skin during application. Because of this skin contact, there exists some health risk associated with use of hair dyes. Thus, hair dyes are regulated in the commercial marketplace and, as new toxicity data is generated for some hair dyes and health risks are discovered, some of these hair dyes are being legally restricted from the cosmetic marketplace.

The European Union is particularly stringent with regard to health regulations. To ensure that hair dyes contain only safe substances, the European Commission adopted the Directive 2012/21/EU to restrict the use of around 45 chemicals in hair dyes. The directive on dyes is part of a general and comprehensive set of regulations, the EU Cosmetics Directive 76/768/EC.

== Religion ==
For Muslims, if a man is not of advanced age, there is no harm in his using black dye. Some of the early Muslims, including some sahabah, permitted the use of black dye. As narrated in a hadith, the best thing with which to dye gray hair is henna and katam (a plant from Yemen which colors it black tinged with red).

== See also ==
- Chapatsu
- Hair highlighting
- Hairstyle
- Human hair color
- Human physical appearance
- Natural dye
- Punk fashion
