= I Knew You Were Trouble =

2012 single by Taylor Swift

Single by Taylor Swift

from the album Red
- Released: November 27, 2012
- Studio: MXM (Stockholm); Conway (Los Angeles)
- Genre: Dubstep; dance-pop; pop rock; electropop; teen pop
- Length: 3:39
- Label: Big Machine
- Songwriters: Taylor Swift; Max Martin; Shellback
- Producers: Max Martin; Shellback

Taylor Swift singles chronology
"Begin Again" (2012)	"I Knew You Were Trouble" (2012)	"22" (2013)

Music video
- "I Knew You Were Trouble" on YouTube

"I Knew You Were Trouble" (Note: Stylized as "I Knew You Were Trouble." (with a period)) is a song by the American singer-songwriter Taylor Swift from her fourth studio album, Red (2012). She wrote it with its producers, Max Martin and Shellback. A dubstep and pop track, "I Knew You Were Trouble" has a production based around electric guitars and synthesizers, accentuated its refrain with a wobble bass and Swift's distorted vocals; critics found the dubstep production a radical departure from Swift's previous country pop sounds. In the lyrics, the narrator blames herself for not recognizing the warning signs of a past toxic relationship.

Big Machine, in partnership with Republic Records, released "I Knew You Were Trouble" to US pop radio on November 27, 2012, as the second pop single and the third overall from Red. The song peaked within the top 10 on record charts and received multi-platinum certifications in Australia, Austria, Canada, New Zealand, and the UK. In the US, the single peaked at number two on the Billboard Hot 100 and spent seven weeks at number one on the Pop Songs chart. Its success on pop radio inspired Swift to recalibrate her artistic identity from country to pop on her 2014 album 1989. Initial reviews were divided: positive comments found the production bold, but criticisms deemed it derivative. Retrospective opinions have regarded "I Knew You Were Trouble" as one of Swift's career-defining singles.

The music video for "I Knew You Were Trouble" premiered on MTV on December 13, 2012. Directed by Anthony Mandler, it depicts Swift with an unfaithful man and ending up alone in a desert. The video won Best Female Video at the 2013 MTV Video Music Awards and the Phenomenon Award at the 2013 YouTube Music Awards. Swift performed "I Knew You Were Trouble" at awards shows including the American Music Awards, the ARIA Music Awards, and the Brit Awards. She included it on the set lists of the Red Tour (2013–2014), the 1989 World Tour (2015), and the Eras Tour (2023–2024). After a 2019 dispute regarding the ownership of her back catalog, Swift re-recorded the song as "I Knew You Were Trouble (Taylor's Version)" for her second re-recorded album, Red (Taylor's Version) (2021).

== Background and production ==
On her fourth studio album, Red (2012), Taylor Swift aimed to experiment with musical styles other than the country pop sound that had defined her artistry at the time. She thus approached producers located outside of her career base in Nashville, Tennessee. Among them was the Swedish producer Max Martin, whose production inspired Swift by "how [it] can just land a chorus". The two as well as the Swedish producer Shellback met in Los Angeles and wrote three songs on Red, including "I Knew You Were Trouble".

Swift developed the song's melody on piano, initially conceiving it as a "really sad piano ballad". She asked Martin and Shellback to help with the production, and they suggested to have elements of dubstep music on it. Although Swift had been familiarized with dubstep through the music that the English singer-songwriter Ed Sheeran introduced to her, she was not aiming to embark on specific trends and instead wanted the sound to convey the chaotic emotions of the lyrics. Deeming it the boldest musical direction of the album, Swift thought that the audience would be "freaked out over" it when they listened to it.

"I Knew You Were Trouble" was recorded by Sam Holland at Conway Recording Studios in Los Angeles and by Michael Ilbert at MXM Studios in Stockholm, Sweden; Eric Eylands provided recording assistance. The track was mixed by Şerban Ghenea at MixStar Studios in Virginia Beach, Virginia, and mastered by Tom Coyne at Sterling Sound Studio in New York City. Martin and Shellback both produced "I Knew You Were Trouble" and played keyboards in it; the latter also programmed the song and played acoustic guitar, electric guitar, and bass guitar.

== Composition ==
"I Knew You Were Trouble"
"I Knew You Were Trouble" is a dance-pop and pop rock song with a dubstep refrain. Critics noted the dubstep experimentation as a radical sonic change from Swift's previous country pop songs.

"I Knew You Were Trouble" is about being involved with someone who is irresistible but flawed: the narrator blames herself for falling in love with him upon recognizing the warning signs in hindsight. Using the verse–chorus form with an added post-chorus, the track begins with a syncopated guitar chord and progresses with a kick drum that drives its rhythm, and then a bass drum that accentuates the beat. During the first pre-chorus, Swift sings, "I knew you were trouble when you walked in", only backed by piano chords and subdued guitar strums. In the second pre-chorus progresses, the drums accelerate and Swift's vocals are double-tracked. The song then transitions into the refrain, accompanied by a drop characterized by a dubstep wobble, synthesizers, and Swift's distorted vocals. The instrumental halts again at the bridge, where Swift contemplates on her past relationship: "You never loved me, or her, or anyone, or anything." Critics described the song's genre as dubstep, dance-pop, pop rock, electropop, and teen pop, with influences of dancehall on the melody and R&B on the vocal processing.

Critics considered the dubstep experimentation on "I Knew You Were Trouble" a significant departure from Swift's country pop beginnings. While describing how the song's style felt "sudden" and "unexpected" when compared to other tracks on Red, the musicologist James Perone believed that it was "logical" for first-time listeners to react in surprise upon hearing "I Knew You Were Trouble" if they were familiar with Swift's work prior to its release. Jon Caramanica of The New York Times commented that the dubstep wobble was a "wrecking ball" that shifted the dynamic of not only "the song but also of Ms. Swift's career". Randall Roberts from the Los Angeles Times remarked that although dubstep had been popularized by DJs such as Zedd and Skrillex, "I Knew You Were Trouble" introduced the genre to a wider audience of mainstream pop, which had been "sonically conservative for the past half-decade". In Pitchfork, Brad Nelson commented that the production was "sharp as [Swift's] lyrics".

== Critical reception ==
The dubstep experimentation divided contemporary critics. James Reed from The Boston Globe wrote that "I Knew You Were Trouble" and the other tracks produced by Martin and Shellback were unoriginal. Amanda Dobbins from Vulture felt the dubstep sound was not innovative, but praised the song as "yet another plucky, vowel-laden Taylor Swift breakup jam". In a Red album review for The Washington Post, Allison Stewart criticized the production as "gratuitous and weird" which overshadowed Swift's lyrics. In defense of Swift, Randall Roberts from the Los Angeles Times said it was "unfair to criticize a 22-year-old for adapting with the times". Though Roberts acknowledged that critics could dismiss the refrain's bass drop as conceit, it was justifiable for Swift—whom he considered a leading pop star—to experiment with mainstream trends.

In positive reviews, Jon Caramanica from The New York Times and Chris Willman from The Hollywood Reporter praised the song for exhibiting Swift's versatility beyond country. Slant Magazine's Jonathan Keefe praised "I Knew You Were Trouble" as one of Red's best tracks because "the production is creative and contemporary in ways that are in service to Swift's songwriting". In a review for Spin, Mark Hogan praised Swift's songcraft and remarked that although the dubstep experimentation initially came off as unoriginal, it "ultimately gets absorbed into [Swift's] own aesthetic".

"I Knew You Were Trouble" featured on 2012 year-end lists by Spin (34th) and The Village Voice's Pazz & Jop critics' poll (59th). Retrospective reviews of "I Knew You Were Trouble" have been generally positive. Hannah Mylrea from NME and Alexis Petridis from The Guardian considered the single a bold artistic statement for Swift, ranking it among the best songs of her catalog. In a 2021 retrospective review, Laura Snapes from The Guardian commented that the song was "the rare pop-EDM crossover" that stood the test of time.

== Release and commercial performance ==
Before Red's release, Swift premiered a snippet of "I Knew You Were Trouble" on Good Morning America on October 8, 2012. The following day, Big Machine Records released the song onto the iTunes Store for digital download. "I Knew You Were Trouble" was released to US pop radio on November 27, 2012, by Big Machine in partnership with Republic Records; it was the second pop radio single from Red, following "We Are Never Ever Getting Back Together". A limited CD single edition of the track featuring fan-exclusive merchandise was available through Swift's official website on December 13, 2012. The song was released as a single in the UK on December 9, 2012, and in Italy on January 11, 2013.

On November 3, 2014, Big Machine removed Swift's discography from the streaming platform Spotify. The decision was made by Swift, who argued that Spotify's ad-supported free service undermined their premium service, which provides higher royalties for songwriters. In December 2015, media outlets reported that "I Knew You Were Trouble" had been re-delivered to Spotify, but its credit was mistakenly given to the Welsh band Lostprophets and their lead singer Ian Watkins. The song was removed from the site after three days. Swift re-added her catalog on Spotify in June 2017.

In the US, "I Knew You Were Trouble" debuted at number three on the Billboard Hot 100 and number one on the Digital Songs chart, with 416,000 copies sold during the first week. Together with "We Are Never Ever Getting Back Together", it made Swift the first artist in digital history to have two 400,000 digital sales opening weeks. Buoyed by strong digital sales, "I Knew You Were Trouble" reached its peak at number two on the Hot 100 chart dated January 12, 2013. Despite not being released to country radio, the track debuted and stayed for one week at number 55 on the Country Airplay chart in April 2013, thanks to unsolicited plays by the Los Angeles radio station KKGO. The song was Swift's first number-one entry on Adult Pop Songs, and it spent seven weeks atop Pop Songs. The Recording Industry Association of America (RIAA) certified "I Knew You Were Trouble" seven times platinum in July 2018. By July 2019, it had sold 5.42 million digital copies in the US. The song's success on pop radio influenced Swift to reinvent her artistry from country to pop on her next studio album, 1989 (2014), which was executive-produced by Swift and Martin.

"I Knew You Were Trouble" was a commercial success in the English-speaking countries, peaking at number two in Canada and the UK; number three in Australia and New Zealand; and number four in Ireland. It has been certified eleven-times platinum in Australia, five-times platinum in Canada, four-times platinum in New Zealand, and triple platinum in the UK. In continental Europe, the single peaked at number one in the Czech Republic, number three in Denmark, number five in Russia, number six in Austria, number eight in the Commonwealth of Independent States and Switzerland, number nine in Germany, and number ten in Belgian Flanders and Finland. The song has been certified triple platinum in Poland, double platinum in Austria, and platinum in Denmark, France, Germany, and Switzerland.

== Music video ==
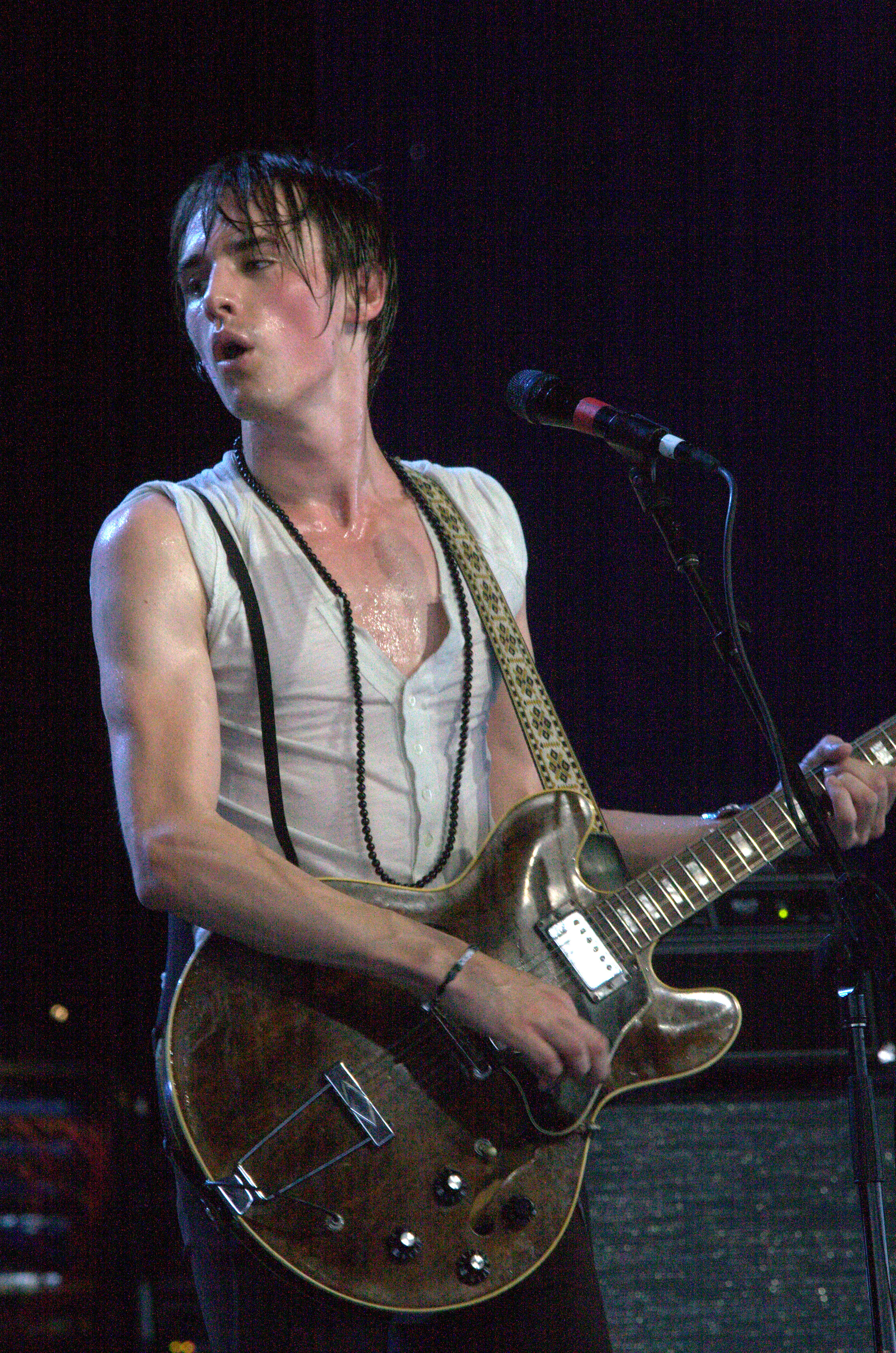
Reeve Carney (pictured in 2010) portrays Swift's love interest in the music video.

Anthony Mandler directed the music video for "I Knew You Were Trouble". Shot in Los Angeles over two days, the video stars Reeve Carney as Swift's love interest. In the video, Swift wears a pink ombré hairstyle, a ripped tee-shirt, and skinny jeans. Marie Claire wrote that this "edgy" look, which coincided with her much-publicized relationship with English singer Harry Styles, signified that she was outgrowing her "good girl" public image.

Swift summarized the video's narrative: "I wanted to tell the story of a girl who falls into a world that's too fast for her, and suffers the consequences." The video begins with Swift waking up in a desert filled with trash and debris from a concert the night before, intertwined with flashbacks of her and her love interest. Swift delivers a monologue reflecting on the past relationship, concluding: "I think that the worst part of it all wasn't losing him. It was losing me." As the song begins, Swift and the love interest are seen sharing intimate moments together. He exhibits behaviors that are unreliable, engaging in bar fights and making out with other girls in a rave. The video concludes with Swift alone in the same desert from the beginning.

Media publications commented on the video's narrative and style. Spin's Chris Martins and Vulture's Amanda Dobbins noted similarities—the desert settings, the "bad boy" love interests, the partying scenes—to Lana Del Rey's 2012 video for "Ride", while Rolling Stone compared the downward spiral of Swift's relationship to that portrayed in Rihanna and Calvin Harris' 2011 video for "We Found Love". Comments by Wendy Geller from Yahoo!, Melinda Newman from Uproxx, and Rachel Brodsky from MTV focused on the video's dark narrative, which depicted a new aspect of Swift's artistry. Martins was not enthusiastic, calling the video unoriginal. A remix of "I Knew You Were Trouble" containing sounds of a screaming goat went viral, resulting in internet memes and boosting the video's popularity.

== Accolades ==
"I Knew You Were Trouble" was one of the award-winning songs at the 2014 BMI Awards. It was one of the "Most Performed Songs" awarded at the 2014 ASCAP Awards, in honor of songwriters and producers. The song won Song of the Year at the 2013 Radio Disney Music Awards. At the 2013 MTV Video Music Awards, "I Knew You Were Trouble" won Best Female Video and was nominated for Video of the Year; it was Swift's second win in the category following "You Belong with Me in 2009. It also won YouTube Phenomenon at the inaugural 2013 YouTube Music Awards. The song received nominations at popularity-catered awards ceremonies including Aussie's Favorite Song at the Nickelodeon Australian Kids' Choice Awards, Choice Music Single – Female at the 2013 Teen Choice Awards, and Favorite Female Singer at the 2013 Kids' Choice Awards.

== Live performances ==
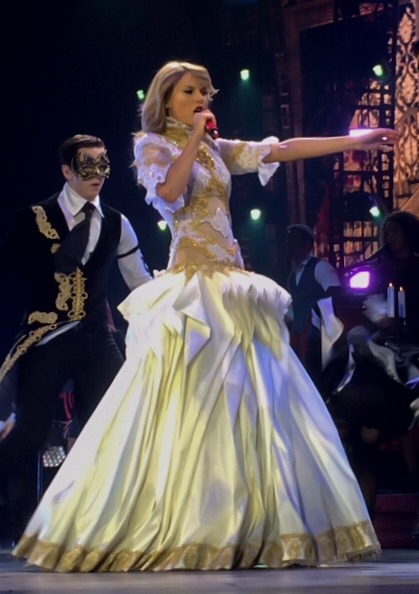
Swift performing "I Knew You Were Trouble" on the Red Tour

Swift performed "I Knew You Were Trouble" for the first time at the 2012 American Music Awards, held at Nokia Theatre L.A. Live on November 18, 2012. She embarked on a promotional tour for Red in Australia and performed the song on Today and the ARIA Music Awards. During Red's promotional campaign in the US, Swift included "I Knew You Were Trouble" in her performances at KIIS-FM Jingle Ball on December 1, Z100 Jingle Ball Concert at Madison Square Garden on December 7, and on Dick Clark's New Year's Rockin' Eve at Times Square on December 31, 2012.

On January 18, 2013, following an appearance at the NRJ Music Awards, Swift held a private concert in Paris, where she included "I Knew You Were Trouble" in the set list. She also made live appearances in the U.K., performing the song at the Brit Awards 2013 on February 20, and on The Graham Norton Show on February 23, 2013. "I Knew You Were Trouble" was part of the regular set list of the Red Tour (2013), a world tour Swift embarked on to promote the album. For both Brit Awards performance and The Red Tour concerts, Swift first performed in a white-and-gold gown with masquerade dancers, and midway changed the costume to black romper and high heels.

"I Knew You Were Trouble" is a recurring song included in many of Swift's live performances outside promotion of Red. She performed the song at the Victoria's Secret Fashion Show 2013, broadcast by CBS on December 10, 2013. During the promotion of her 2014 album 1989, Swift performed the song at the iHeartRadio Music Festival on September 19, the We Can Survive benefit concert at the Hollywood Bowl on October 24, and the Jingle Ball Tour 2014 on December 5, 2014.

During the concerts of the 1989 World Tour (2015), she included an industrial rock-oriented version of "I Knew You Were Trouble" in the set lists. An acoustic version of "I Knew You Were Trouble" was a "surprise song" Swift performed at the first concert in Manchester, England, and the concert in Perth, Australia, as part of her Reputation Stadium Tour (2018). During the promotion of her 2019 album Lover, Swift again performed the song at the Wango Tango festival on June 1, the Amazon Prime Day concert on July 10, and the City of Lover one-off concert in Paris on September 9, 2019. At the 2019 American Music Awards, where she was honored as the Artist of the Decade, Swift performed "I Knew You Were Trouble" as part of a medley of her songs. Swift included the song on the set list of the Eras Tour (2023–2024).

== Covers and other usage ==
In 2014, the song was covered by the American metalcore band We Came As Romans as part of Fearless Records' Punk Goes Pop Vol. 6. The American singer Sabrina Carpenter recorded a stripped-down cover of the song as part of the Spotify Singles series in 2023.

== Personnel ==
Credits are adapted from the liner notes of Red.

- Taylor Swift – lead vocals, backing vocals, writer
- Max Martin – producer, writer, keyboards
- Shellback – producer, writer, acoustic guitar, electric guitar, bass, keyboards, programming
- Tom Coyne – mastering
- Eric Eylands – recording assistant
- Şerban Ghenea – mixing
- John Hanes – engineering
- Sam Holland – recording
- Michael Ilbert – recording
- Tim Roberts – engineering assistant
- JoAnn Tominaga – production co-ordinator

== Charts ==
=== Weekly charts ===
Weekly charts performance for "I Knew You Were Trouble"
Chart (2012–2013)	Peak position
Australia (ARIA)	3
Austria (Ö3 Austria Top 40)	6
Belgium (Ultratop 50 Flanders)	10
Belgium (Ultratop 50 Wallonia)	32
Brazil (Billboard Brasil Hot 100)	24
Bulgaria Airplay (BAMP)	29
Canada Hot 100 (Billboard)	2
Canada AC (Billboard)	5
Canada CHR/Top 40 (Billboard)	1
Canada Hot AC (Billboard)	1
CIS Airplay (TopHit)	8
Croatia (HRT)	1
Czech Republic Airplay (ČNS IFPI)	1
Denmark (Tracklisten)	3
Denmark Airplay (Tracklisten)	1
Euro Digital Song Sales (Billboard)	3
Finland Download (Latauslista)	10
France (SNEP)	14
Germany (GfK)	9
Germany Airplay (BVMI)	5
Hungary (Rádiós Top 40)	13
Ireland (IRMA)	4
Israel International Airplay (Media Forest)	2
Japan (Japan Hot 100)	51
Japan Adult Contemporary (Billboard)	22
Lebanon (Lebanese Top 20)	3
Luxembourg Digital Song Sales (Billboard)	6
Mexico Anglo (Monitor Latino)	15
Netherlands (Dutch Top 40)	19
Netherlands (Single Top 100)	27
New Zealand (Recorded Music NZ)	3
Russia Airplay (TopHit)	5
Scottish Singles Sales (Official Charts)	2
Slovakia Airplay (ČNS IFPI)	17
Spain (Promusicae)	17
Sweden (Sverigetopplistan)	37
Switzerland (Schweizer Hitparade)	8
Turkey (Number One Top 20)	6
UK Singles (Official Charts)	2
Ukraine Airplay (TopHit)	88
US Billboard Hot 100	2
US Adult Contemporary (Billboard)	5
US Adult Pop Airplay (Billboard)	1
US Country Airplay (Billboard)	55
US Dance Airplay (Billboard)	18
US Latin Airplay (Billboard)	38
US Pop Airplay (Billboard)	1
US Rhythmic Airplay (Billboard)	21

2024 weekly charts performance for "I Knew You Were Trouble"
Chart (2024)	Peak position
Poland (Polish Airplay Top 100)	58

=== Year-end charts ===
2012 year-end chart performance for "I Knew You Were Trouble"
Chart (2012)	Position
Australia (ARIA)	27
New Zealand (Recorded Music NZ)	33
UK Singles (Official Charts Company)	102

2013 year-end chart performance for "I Knew You Were Trouble"
Chart (2013)	Position
Australia (ARIA)	55
Austria (Ö3 Austria Top 40)	34
Belgium (Ultratop Flanders)	51
Belgium (Ultratop Wallonia)	81
Canada (Canadian Hot 100)	12
Denmark (Tracklisten)	23
France (SNEP)	43
Germany (Official German Charts)	57
Hungary (Rádiós Top 40)	94
Ireland (IRMA)	17
Netherlands (Dutch Top 40)	72
New Zealand (Recorded Music NZ)	31
Russia Airplay (TopHit)	32
Switzerland (Schweizer Hitparade)	34
Ukraine Airplay (TopHit)	86
UK Singles (Official Charts Company)	17
US Billboard Hot 100	16
US Adult Contemporary (Billboard)	17
US Adult Pop Songs (Billboard)	18
US Pop Songs (Billboard)	3
US Radio Songs (Billboard)	9

=== All-time charts ===
1992–2017 all-time chart performance for "I Knew You Were Trouble"
Chart (1992–2017)	Position
US Pop Songs (Billboard)	49

== Certifications ==
Certifications for "I Knew You Were Trouble"
Region	Certification	Certified units/sales
Australia (ARIA)	11× Platinum	770,000^{‡}
Austria (IFPI Austria)	2× Platinum	60,000^{*}
Belgium (BRMA)	Gold	15,000^{*}
Brazil (Pro-Música Brasil)	Diamond	160,000^{‡}
Canada (Music Canada)	5× Platinum	400,000^{*}
Denmark (IFPI Danmark)	Platinum	90,000^{‡}
France (SNEP)	Platinum	200,000^{‡}
Germany (BVMI)	Platinum	300,000^{‡}
Italy (FIMI)	Gold	25,000^{‡}
Japan (RIAJ)	Gold	100,000^{*}
Mexico (AMPROFON)	Gold	30,000^{*}
New Zealand (RMNZ)	4× Platinum	120,000^{‡}
Poland (ZPAV)	3× Platinum	150,000^{‡}
Portugal (AFP)	Gold	10,000^{‡}
Spain (Promusicae)	Gold	30,000^{‡}
Sweden (GLF)	Gold	20,000^{‡}
Switzerland (IFPI Switzerland)	Platinum	30,000^{^}
United Kingdom (BPI)	3× Platinum	1,800,000^{‡}
United States (RIAA)	7× Platinum	7,000,000^{‡}
^{*} Sales figures based on certification alone.^{^} Shipments figures based on certification alone.^{‡} Sales+streaming figures based on certification alone.

== "I Knew You Were Trouble (Taylor's Version)" ==
"I Knew You Were Trouble (Taylor's Version)"

Song by Taylor Swift

from the album Red (Taylor's Version)
- Released: November 12, 2021
- Studio: Conway Recording (Los Angeles); Kitty Committee (Belfast)
- Length: 3:39
- Label: Republic
- Songwriters: Taylor Swift; Max Martin; Shellback
- Producers: Taylor Swift; Shellback; Christopher Rowe

Lyric video
- "I Knew You Were Trouble (Taylor's Version)" on YouTube

Following the 2019 dispute regarding the ownership of her back catalog, Swift confirmed in November 2020 that she would be re-recording her entire back catalog. Swift previewed the re-recorded version of "I Knew You Were Trouble", subtitled "Taylor's Version", via her Instagram on August 5, 2021. The re-recorded version was produced by Swift, Shellback, and Christopher Rowe. It was engineered and edited at Prime Recording in Nashville, and Swift's vocals were recorded at Conway Recording Studios in Los Angeles and Kitty Committee Studio in Belfast.

"I Knew You Were Trouble (Taylor's Version)" was released as part of her second re-recorded album, Red (Taylor's Version), on November 12, 2021, through Republic Records. Unlike the original track, the title of the re-recorded version is not stylized with a period at the end. Critics complimented the sharper reworked instrumentation for better conveying the emotion.

After Red (Taylor's Version) was released, "I Knew You Were Trouble (Taylor's Version)" entered the top 30 of charts in Australia (21), Canada (29), New Zealand (26), and Singapore (13). It peaked at number 23 on the Billboard Global 200. In the US, the re-recording peaked at number 46 on the Billboard Hot 100 and number 16 on Billboard's Adult Contemporary chart.

=== Personnel ===
Credits are adapted from the liner notes of Red (Taylor's Version).

- Taylor Swift – lead vocals, background vocals, songwriter, producer
- Christopher Rowe – producer, lead vocals engineer
- Shellback – producer, songwriter
- Max Martin – songwriter
- Max Bernstein – synthesizers
- Matt Billingslea – drums programming
- Bryce Bordone – engineer
- Dan Burns – additional programming, additional engineer
- Derek Garten – engineer, editor
- Şerban Ghenea – mixing
- Amos Heller – bass guitar
- Sam Holland – lead vocals engineer
- Mike Meadows – acoustic guitar, synthesizers
- Paul Sidoti – electric guitar

=== Charts ===
==== Weekly charts ====
Chart performance for "I Knew You Were Trouble (Taylor's Version)"
Chart (2021–2024)	Peak position
Australia (ARIA)	21
Canada Hot 100 (Billboard)	29
Canada AC (Billboard)	27
Canada Canada CHR/Top 40	42
Canada Hot AC (Billboard)	47
Global 200 (Billboard)	23
New Zealand (Recorded Music NZ)	26
Portugal (AFP)	85
Singapore (RIAS)	13
South Africa (RISA)	92
Sweden Heatseeker (Sverigetopplistan)	13
UK Audio Streaming (Official Charts)	42
US Billboard Hot 100	46
US Adult Contemporary (Billboard)	16
US Adult Pop Airplay (Billboard)	39

==== Year-end charts ====
2022 year-end chart performance for "I Knew You Were Trouble (Taylor's Version)"
Chart (2022)	Position
US Adult Contemporary (Billboard)	37

=== Certifications ===
Certifications for "I Knew You Were Trouble (Taylor's Version)"
Region	Certification	Certified units/sales
Australia (ARIA)	2× Platinum	140,000^{‡}
Brazil (Pro-Música Brasil)	Gold	20,000^{‡}
New Zealand (RMNZ)	Platinum	30,000^{‡}
Poland (ZPAV)	Gold	25,000^{‡}
United Kingdom (BPI)	Gold	400,000^{‡}
^{‡} Sales+streaming figures based on certification alone.

== See also ==
- List of highest-certified singles in Australia
- List of number-one digital songs of 2012 (U.S.)
- List of number-one digital songs of 2013 (U.S.)
- List of Mainstream Top 40 number-one hits of 2013 (U.S.)
- List of Adult Top 40 number-one singles of 2013
