= List of number-one digital songs of 2013 (U.S.) =

2013 highest-selling digital singles in the United States

The highest-selling digital singles in the United States are ranked in the Hot Digital Songs chart, published by Billboard magazine. The data are compiled by Nielsen SoundScan based on each single's weekly digital sales, which combines sales of different versions of a single for a summarized figure.

== Chart history ==
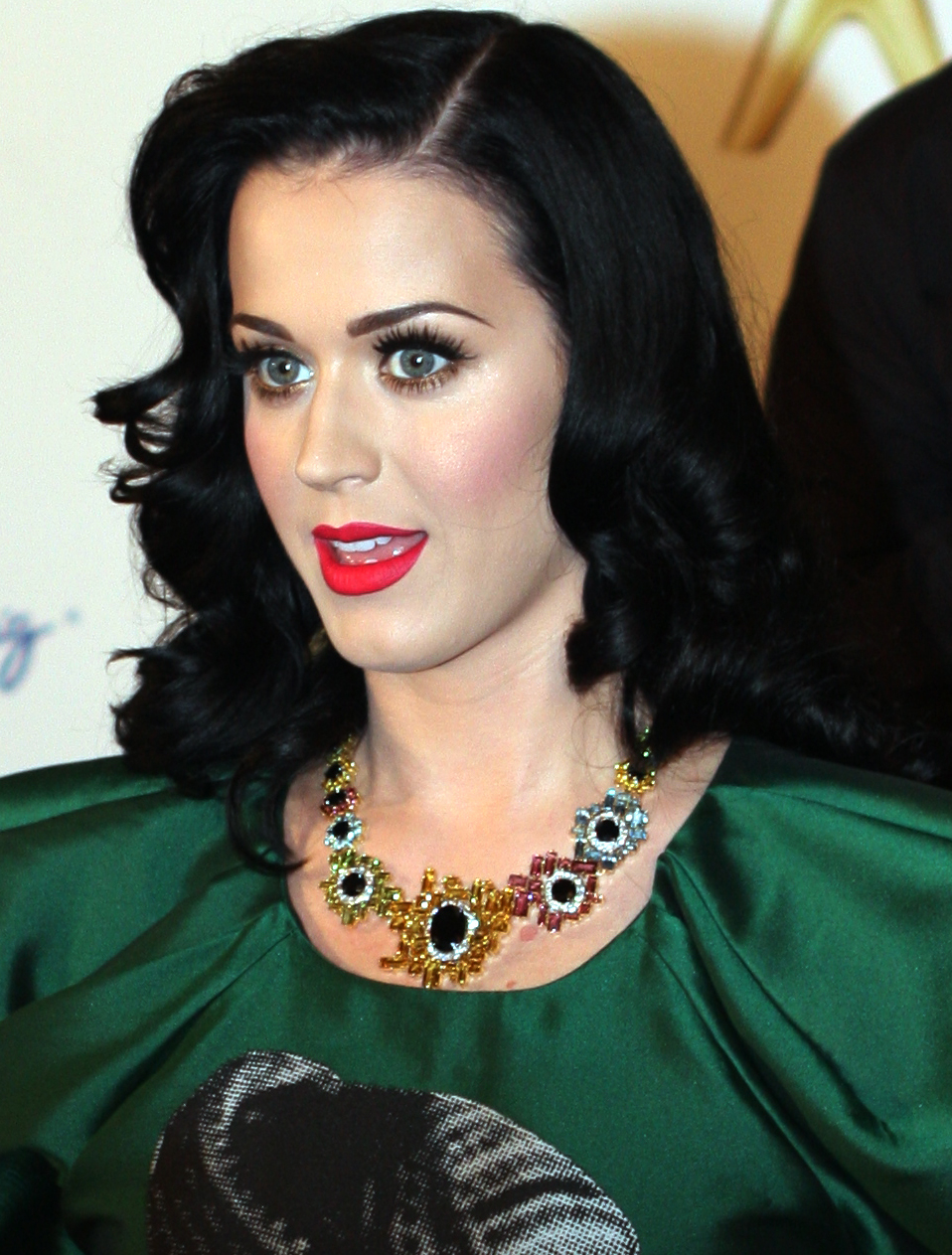
Katy Perry's "Roar" had the second highest debut for 2013 with 557,000 downloads.

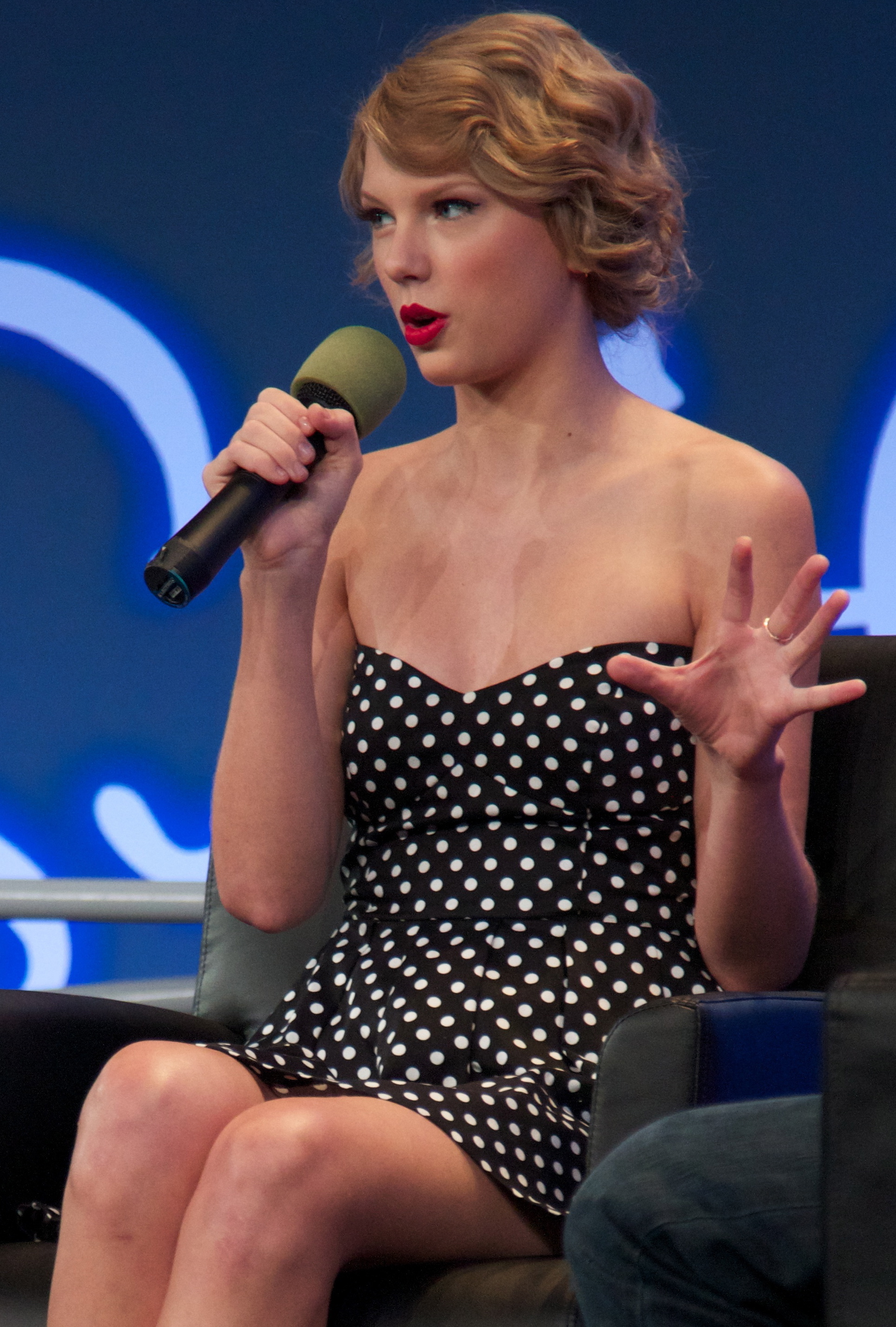
Taylor Swift's "I Knew You Were Trouble" posted the largest weekly download total in 2013, selling 582,000 downloads in the week of January 12 and had the highest debut for 2013.

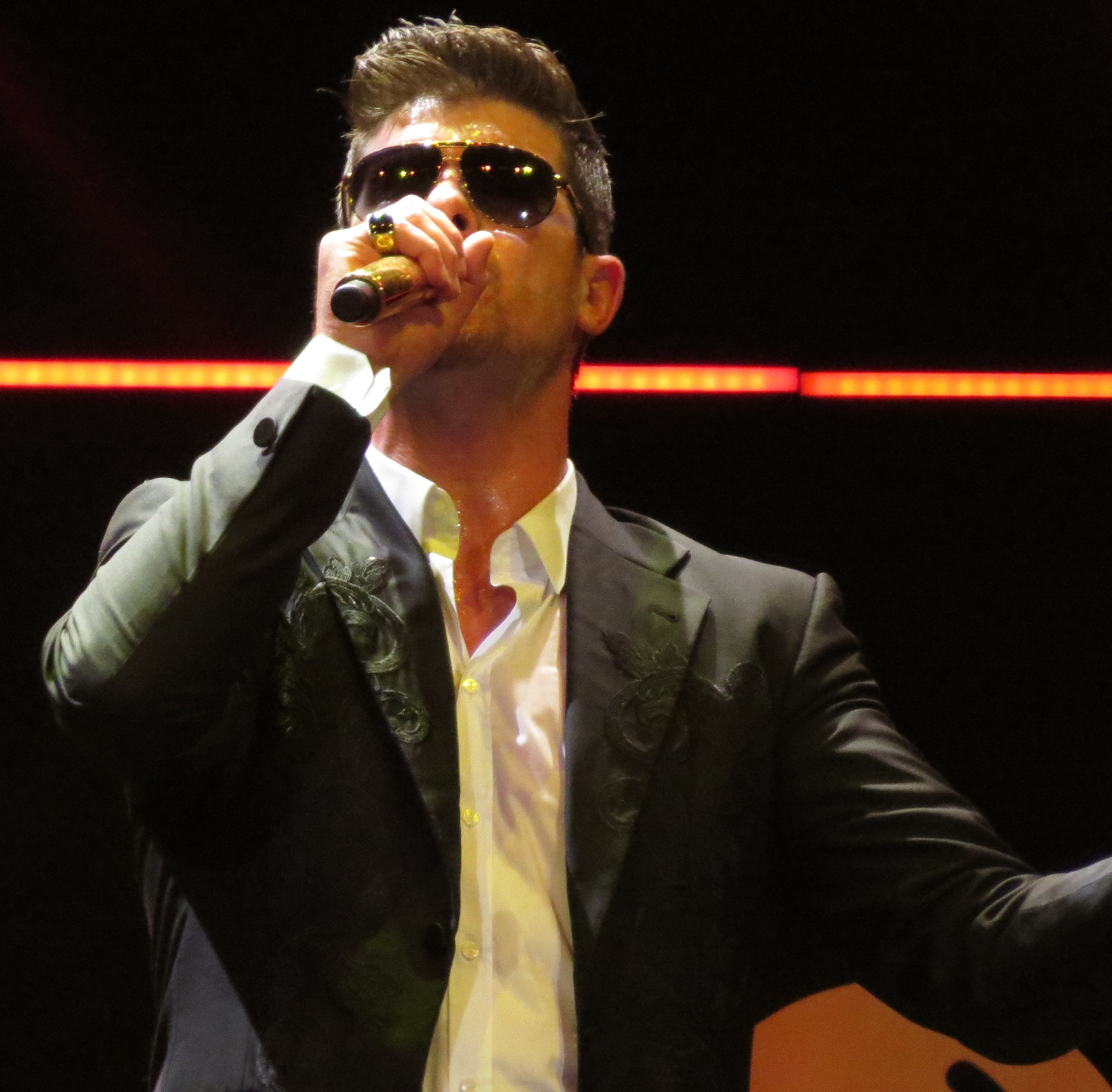
Robin Thicke's "Blurred Lines" tied with Macklemore & Ryan Lewis's "Thrift Shop" for the longest command on the chart in 2013. The two songs topped the chart for 10 weeks each.

Key
†	Indicates best-charting digital song of 2013

Issue date	Song	Artist(s)	Weekly sales	Ref(s)
January 5	"Locked Out of Heaven"	Bruno Mars	226,000	
January 12	"I Knew You Were Trouble"	Taylor Swift	582,000	
January 19	"I Knew You Were Trouble"	Taylor Swift	326,000	
January 26	"Thrift Shop" †	Macklemore & Ryan Lewis featuring Wanz	279,000	
February 2	"Thrift Shop" †	Macklemore & Ryan Lewis featuring Wanz	341,000	
February 9	"Thrift Shop" †	Macklemore & Ryan Lewis featuring Wanz	357,000	
February 16	"Thrift Shop" †	Macklemore & Ryan Lewis featuring Wanz	381,000	
February 23	"Thrift Shop" †	Macklemore & Ryan Lewis featuring Wanz	389,000	
March 2	"Thrift Shop" †	Macklemore & Ryan Lewis featuring Wanz	412,000	
March 9	"Thrift Shop" †	Macklemore & Ryan Lewis featuring Wanz	363,000	
March 16	"Thrift Shop" †	Macklemore & Ryan Lewis featuring Wanz	326,000	
March 23	"Thrift Shop" †	Macklemore & Ryan Lewis featuring Wanz	306,000	
March 30	"Thrift Shop" †	Macklemore & Ryan Lewis featuring Wanz	270,000	
April 6	"Just Give Me a Reason"	Pink featuring Nate Ruess	241,000	
April 13	"Just Give Me a Reason"	Pink featuring Nate Ruess	286,000	
April 20	"When I Was Your Man"	Bruno Mars	340,000	
April 27	"Just Give Me a Reason"	Pink featuring Nate Ruess	283,000	
May 4	"Just Give Me a Reason"	Pink featuring Nate Ruess	262,000	
May 11	"Can't Hold Us"	Macklemore and Ryan Lewis featuring Ray Dalton	259,000	
May 18	"Can't Hold Us"	Macklemore and Ryan Lewis featuring Ray Dalton	262,000	
May 25	"Can't Hold Us"	Macklemore and Ryan Lewis featuring Ray Dalton	241,000	
June 1	"Can't Hold Us"	Macklemore and Ryan Lewis featuring Ray Dalton	231,000	
June 8	"Can't Hold Us"	Macklemore and Ryan Lewis featuring Ray Dalton	212,000	
June 15	"Blurred Lines"	Robin Thicke featuring T.I. and Pharrell	229,000	
June 22	"Blurred Lines"	Robin Thicke featuring T.I. and Pharrell	315,000	
June 29	"Blurred Lines"	Robin Thicke featuring T.I. and Pharrell	371,000	
July 6	"Blurred Lines"	Robin Thicke featuring T.I. and Pharrell	424,000	
July 13	"Blurred Lines"	Robin Thicke featuring T.I. and Pharrell	423,000	
July 20	"Blurred Lines"	Robin Thicke featuring T.I. and Pharrell	423,000	
July 27	"Blurred Lines"	Robin Thicke featuring T.I. and Pharrell	384,000	
August 3	"Blurred Lines"	Robin Thicke featuring T.I. and Pharrell	340,000	
August 10	"Best Song Ever"	One Direction	322,000	
August 17	"Blurred Lines"	Robin Thicke featuring T.I. and Pharrell	405,000	
August 24	"Blurred Lines"	Robin Thicke featuring T.I. and Pharrell	346,000	
August 31	"Roar"	Katy Perry	557,000	
September 7	"Roar"	Katy Perry	392,000	
September 14	"Roar"	Katy Perry	448,000	
September 21	"Roar"	Katy Perry	373,000	
September 28	"Wrecking Ball"	Miley Cyrus	477,000	
October 5	"Royals"	Lorde	307,000	
October 12	"Royals"	Lorde	294,000	
October 19	"Royals"	Lorde	309,000	
October 26	"Royals"	Lorde	294,000	
November 2	"Rap God"	Eminem	270,000	
November 9	"Royals"	Lorde	222,000	
November 16	"The Monster"	Eminem featuring Rihanna	373,000	
November 23	"Say Something"	A Great Big World and Christina Aguilera	189,000	
November 30	"The Monster"	Eminem featuring Rihanna	243,000	
December 7	"The Monster"	Eminem featuring Rihanna	241,000	
December 14	"Timber"	Pitbull featuring Kesha	237,000	
December 21	"Timber"	Pitbull featuring Kesha	193,000	
December 28	"Say Something"	A Great Big World and Christina Aguilera	233,000	

== See also ==
- 2013 in music
- List of Billboard Hot 100 number-one singles of 2013
