= Toluenediamine =

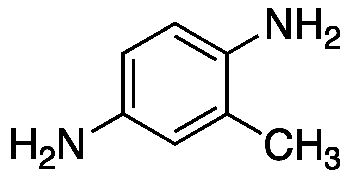
2,5-Diaminotoluene

Toluenediamine may refer to these isomeric organic compounds with the formula C_{6}H_{3}(NH_{2})_{2}(CH_{3}):

- 2,4-Diaminotoluene, precursor to toluene diisocyanate and azo dye.
- 2,6-Diaminotoluene, a common impurity in 2,4-diaminotoluene
- 2,5-Diaminotoluene, precursor to hair dyes.
