= 2,3,5-Trimethylpyrazine =

Names
- Preferred IUPAC name 2,3,5-Trimethylpyrazine
- Other names Pyrazine, 2,3,5-trimethyl-;2,3,5-Trimethyl pyrazine;2,3,5-Trimethyl pyrazine (natural);2,3,5-Trimethylpyrazine;2,3,6-Trimethylpyrazine;5-23-05-00419 (Beilstein Handbook Reference);AI3-34442;BRN 0002423;CCRIS 2932;FEMA No. 3244;Pyrazine, trimethyl-;Trimethylpyrazine

Identifiers
CAS Number	14667-55-1
3D model (JSmol)	Interactive image
ChEBI	CHEBI:190131
ChEMBL	ChEMBL320146
ChemSpider	24972
ECHA InfoCard	100.035.178
EC Number	238-712-0
PubChem CID	26808
UNII	Q8PR0W8TIT
CompTox Dashboard (EPA)	DTXSID1047075
- InChI: InChI=1S/C7H10N2/c1-5-4-8-6(2)7(3)9-5/h4H,1-3H3 Key: IAEGWXHKWJGQAZ-UHFFFAOYSA-N
- SMILES: CC1=CN=C(C(=N1)C)C

Properties
Chemical formula	C_{7}H_{10}N_{2}
Molar mass	122.171 g·mol^{−1}
Appearance	colourless to slightly yellow liquid
Odor	roasted nut, baked potato odour
Density	0.979 g mL^{−1}
Boiling point	173.1 °C (343.6 °F; 446.2 K)
Solubility in water	Alcohol, oils, water (1.521e+004 mg/L at 25 °C (est)
Refractive index (n_{D})	1.5030 to 1.5050

Hazards
- GHS labelling
Pictograms	(GHS02: Flammable) (GHS07: Exclamation mark)
Signal word	Warning
Hazard statements	H226, H302
Precautionary statements	P210, P233, P240, P241, P242, P243, P264, P270, P280, P301+P312, P303+P361+P353, P330, P370+P378, P403+P235, P501
Flash point	54.4 °C (129.9 °F; 327.5 K)
- Lethal dose or concentration (LD, LC)
LD_{50} (median dose)	806 mg/kg rat
- Except where otherwise noted, data are given for materials in their standard state (at 25 °C [77 °F], 100 kPa). Infobox references

2,3,5-Trimethylpyrazine (chemical formula C_{7}H_{10}N_{2}) is one of the most broadly used edible synthesis fragrances. It comes from baked food, fried barley, potatoes, and peanuts. 2,3,5-Trimethylpyrazine is used for the flavor in cocoa, coffee, chocolate, potato, cereal, and fried nuts.

== Physical properties ==
The specific gravity depends on the quality and the producer and ranges from 0.967 to 0.987.

== Synthesis ==
2,3,5-Trimethylpyrazine can be synthesized from 2,3-butanedione and 1,2-diaminopropane. First, 1,2-diaminopropane is synthesized by amination of isopropanolamine in the presence of ammonia and a hydrogenation catalyst: Raney Ni. The effect of the amount of Raney Ni catalyst, the molar ratio of materials, reactions are as follows: the molar ratio of isopropanolamine to ammonia is 1:3.5, the reaction temperature is 160 °C, the reaction is 5 hours, the molar ratio of hydrogen to isopropanolamine is 1:5. Then the reaction consists of synthesis of 2,3,5-trimethyl-5,6-dihydropyrazine and 2,3,5-trimethylpyrazine. The optimum conditions of 2,3,5-trimethyl-5,6-dihydropropyrazine synthesis are established:2,3-butanedione which is mixed with anhydrous ethyl alcohol (the mass ratio of anhydrous ethyl alcohol to 2,3-butanedione was 5:1) is dropped to the mixture of anhydrous ethyl alcohol and 1,2-diaminopropane (the mass ratio of anhydrous ethyl alcohol to 1,2-diaminopropane was 6:1) at the even pace for four hours, the molar ratio of 2,3-butanedione to 1,2-diaminopropane is 1:1.1, the condensation reaction temperature is −5 °C. The best dehydrogen oxidation conditions are as follows: air is used as oxidant, the molar ration of potassium hydroxide and 2,3,5-Trimethyl-5,6-dihydro-pyrazine is 3:1, the mass ratio of ethanol to 2,3,5-trimethyl-5,6-dihydro-pyrazine 10:1, reaction temperature 68 °C, reaction time seven hours.

There are several other ways to synthesis 2,3,5-trimethylpyrazine:

- Piperazine gas phase catalytic dehydrogenation

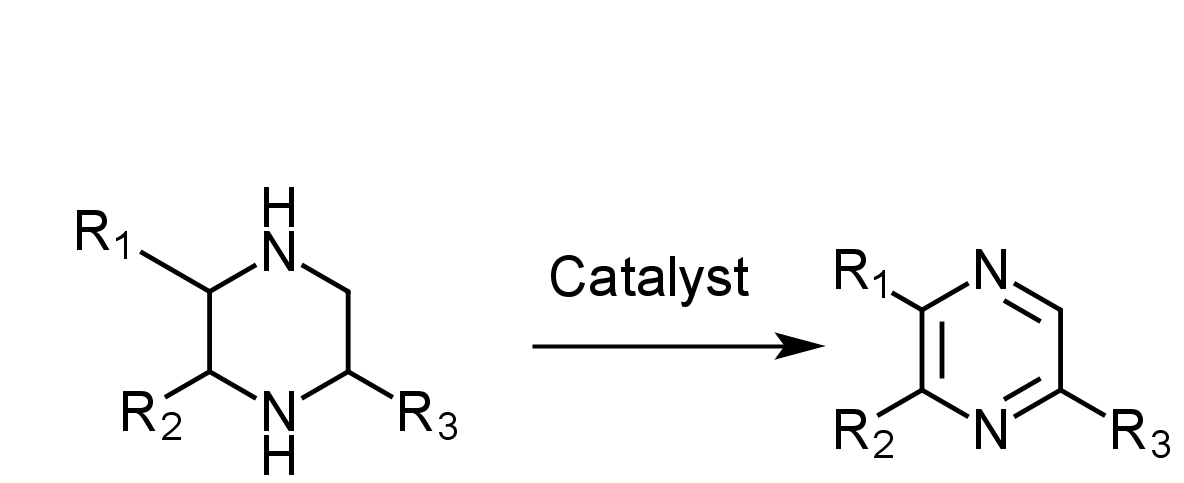

- N-(β alkane alcohol)ethanediamine gas phase catalysis

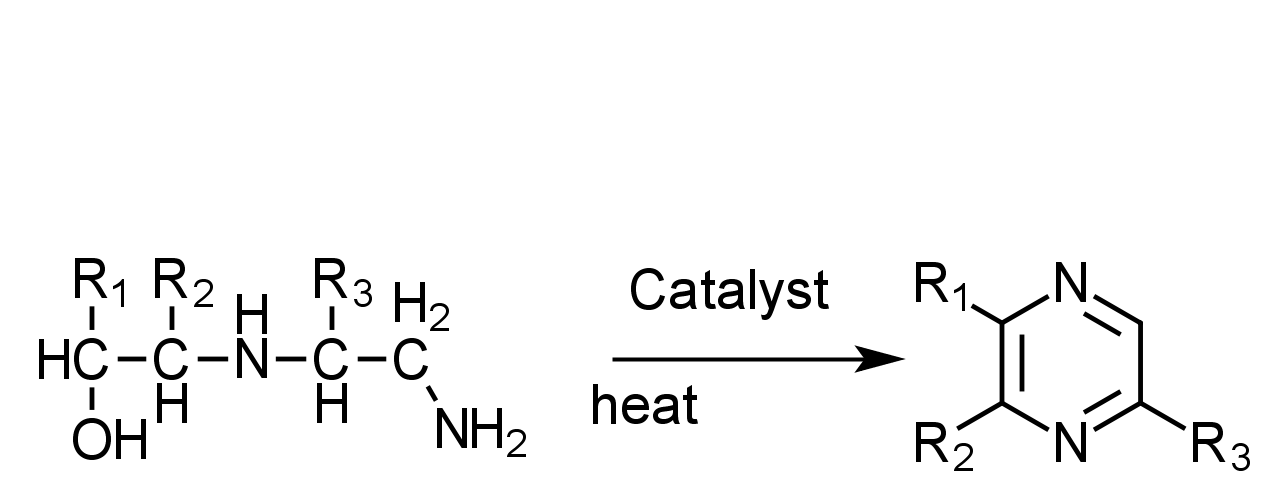

- Ethanediamine and methyl aldehyde gas phase catalysis

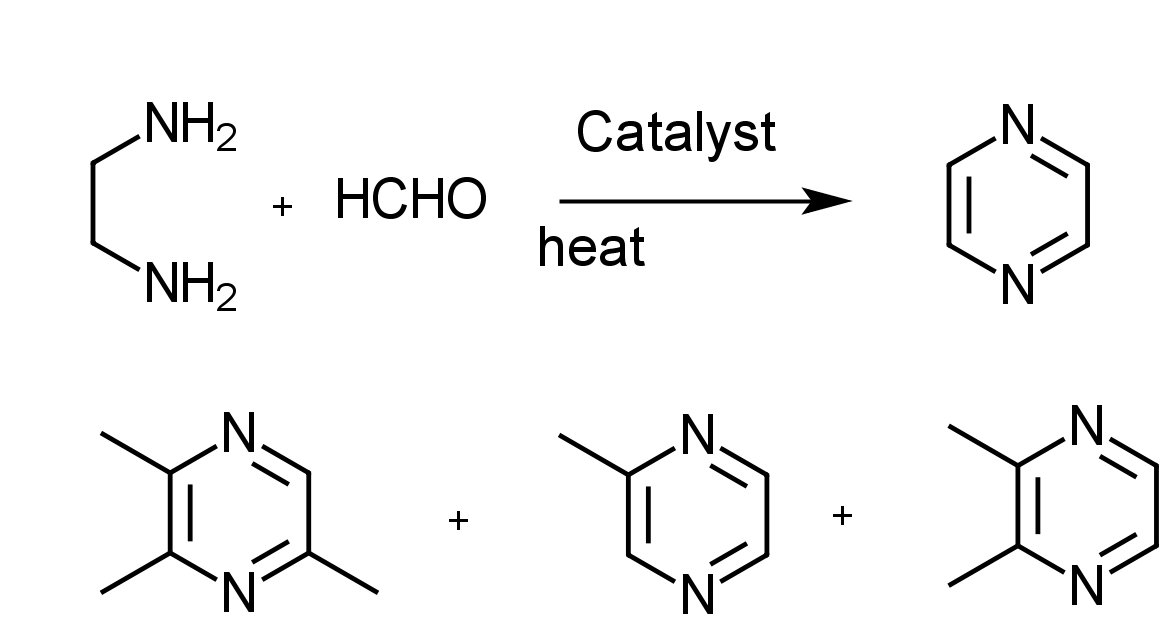

- Diamine and diol gas phase catalysis

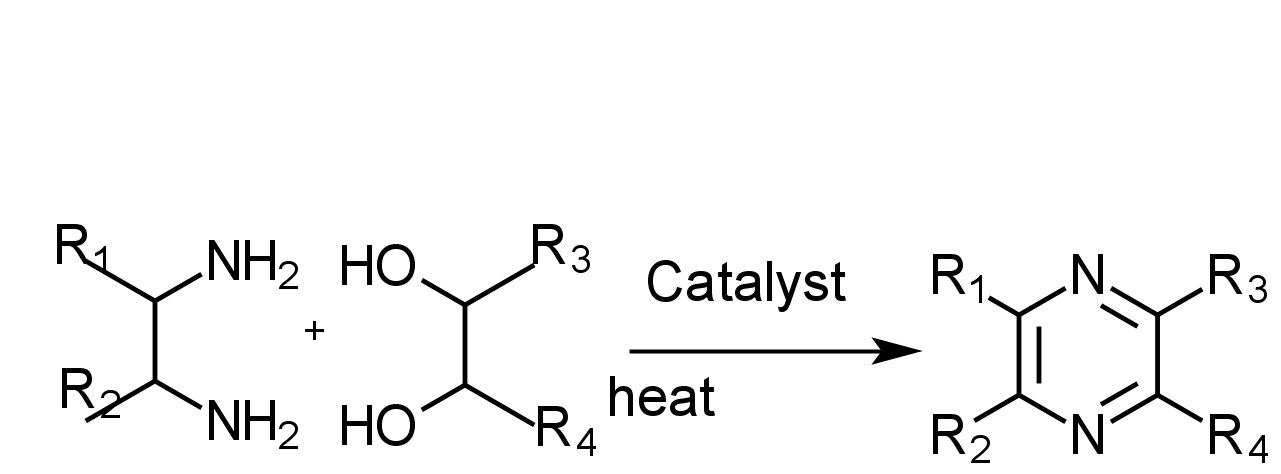

== Use limit in food ==
FEMA (mg/kg)
Soft drinks 5.0～10
Candy 5.0～10
Baked food 5.0～10
Cereal 2.0
Seasoning 2.0
Meat 2.0
Dairy 1.0
Soup 2.0

== Additional references ==
- 2,3,5-三甲基吡嗪 | 14667-55-1
- 2me3me5me-pyrazine - Synthesis
- 14667-55-1, 2,3,5-trimethylpyrazine, CAS No 14667-55-1 2,3,5-trimethylpyrazine
- 2,3,5-三甲基吡嗪,14667-55-1，生产厂家，价格-lookchem
- 2，3，5-三甲基吡嗪的合成研究
- 2,3,5-trimethyl pyrazine, 14667-55-1
- AIST:Spectral Database for Organic Compounds, SDBS
