= Chapatsu =

Japanese style of hair coloring

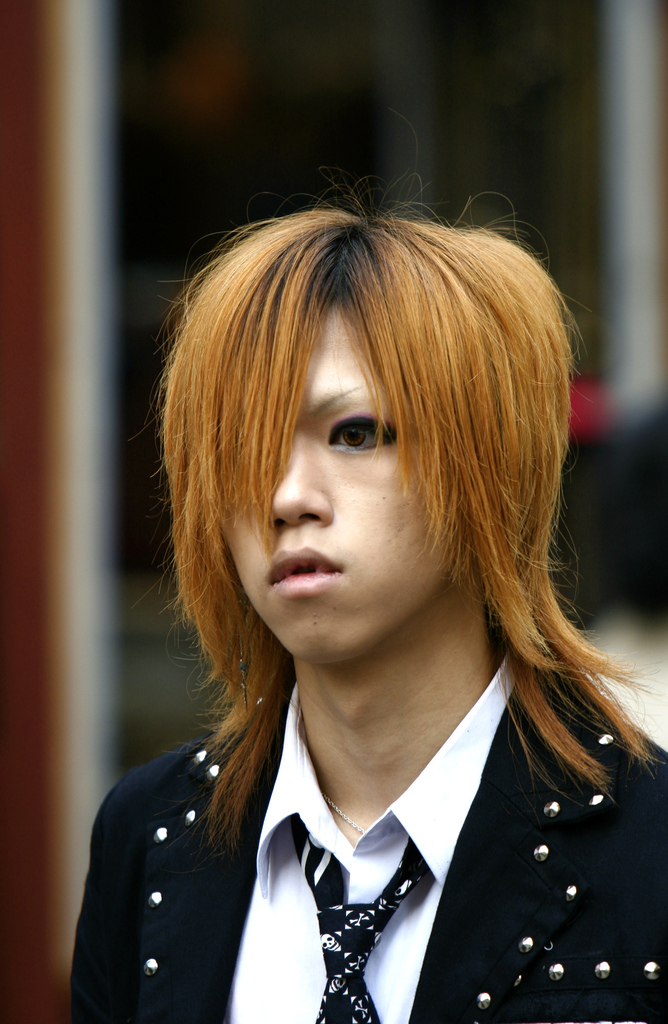
An example of the chapatsu (Japanese boy).

Chapatsu (茶髪/ちゃぱつ), literally "brown hair" in the Japanese language, is a style of bleaching (and occasionally dyeing) hair, found among Japanese teens. The style was once banned at Japanese schools and became a widespread topic of the civic right to self-expression, but discussion of the topic died down due to the ubiquity of the style.

== Etymology ==
The word chapatsu is formed from two morphemes: 茶, meaning "tea or brown, in this case, brown" and 髪, meaning "hair". Chapatsu originally referred to a variety of colors of hair dye, including blonde, red, orange, and blue, it now refers to brown hue. In Japanese the word is also frequently written in hiragana syllabary.

== Style ==
While the style itself began to show up in Tokyo streets during the early to mid-1990s, chapatsu was first described in Imidas, an annual publication of new words and concepts in the Japanese language, in 1997. Chapatsu did not appear in Kōjien, an authoritative dictionary of the Japanese language, until 1998. The style first gained popularity among adolescent girls, seeking to accentuate their tanned skin (rebelling against more traditional definitions of beauty), but quickly became mainstream. By the mid-2000s, however, trends seemed to indicate that the "chapatsu" as a mainstream style was on its way out. Although chapatsu died out as youth-centered fashion trend of rebellion, it came to be accepted not only on young people but also in certain business settings, and it was established before long as a Japanese fashion.

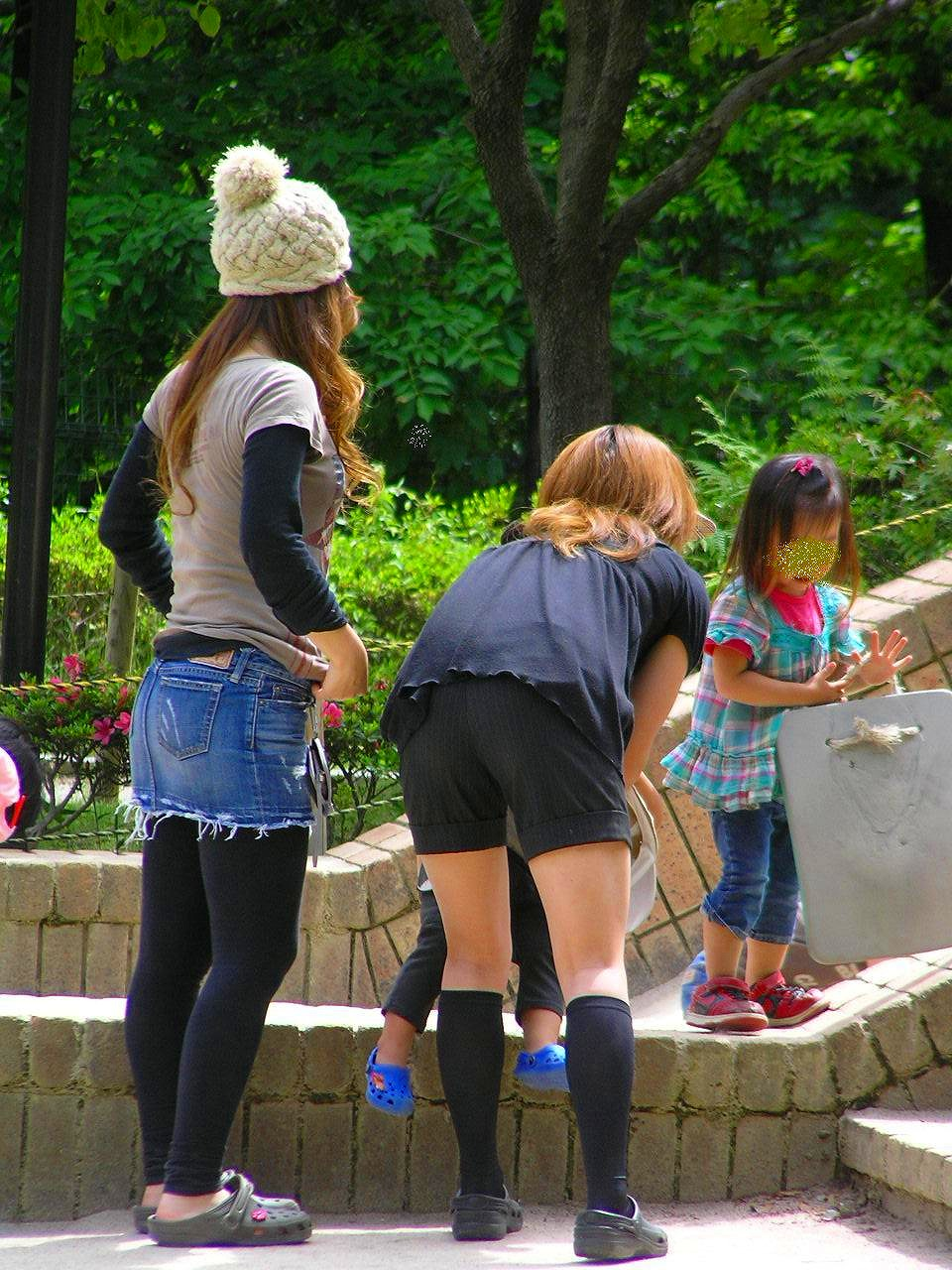
The brown hair also became popular with Yanmama (young mothers).

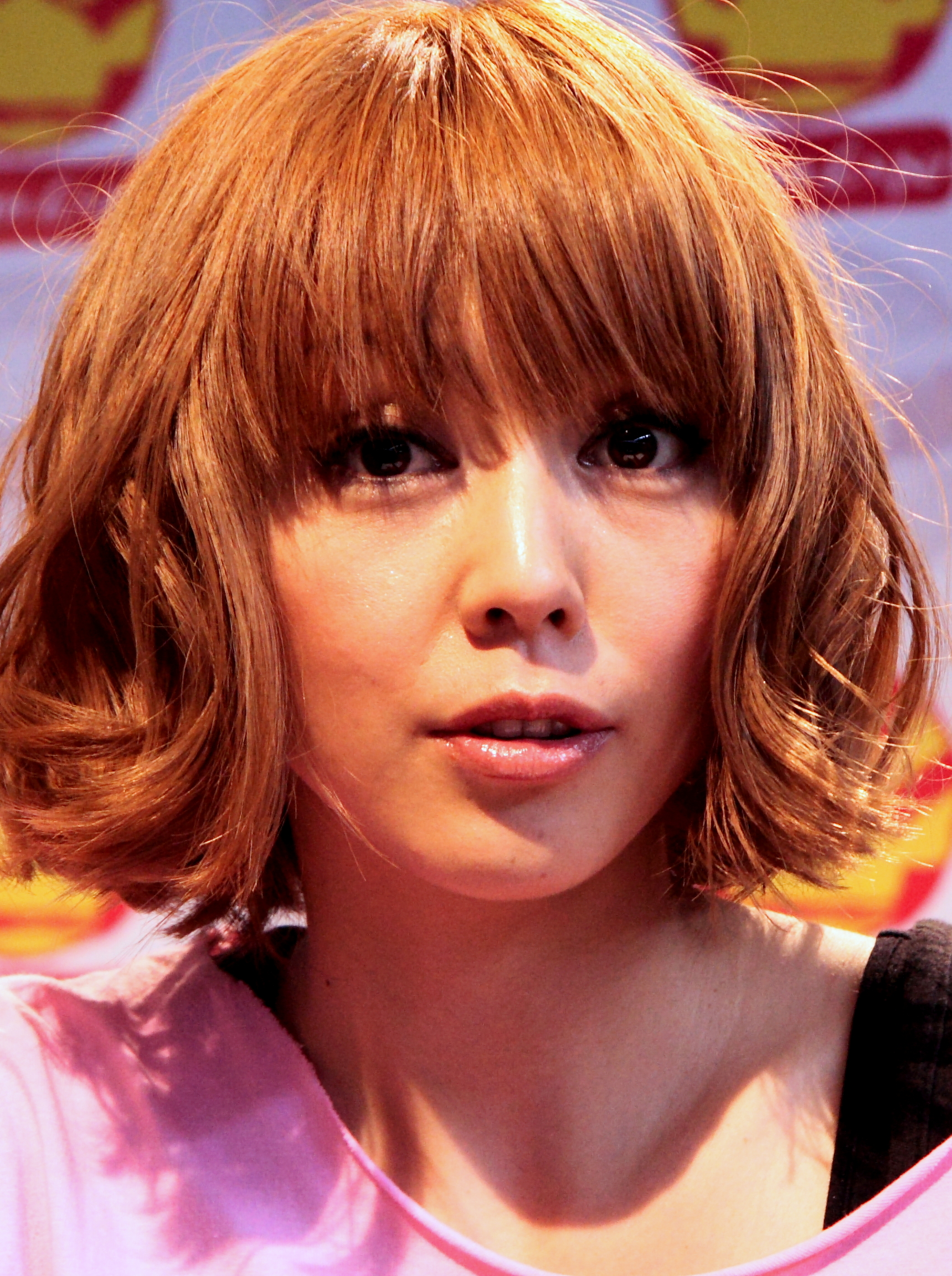
Japanese singer Yumi Yoshimura with a chapatsu.

== See also ==
- Ganguro
