= Ombré =

Gradual blending of color

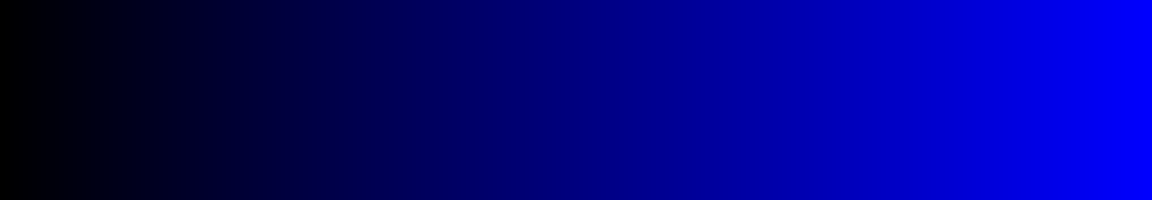
Ombré: black to blue

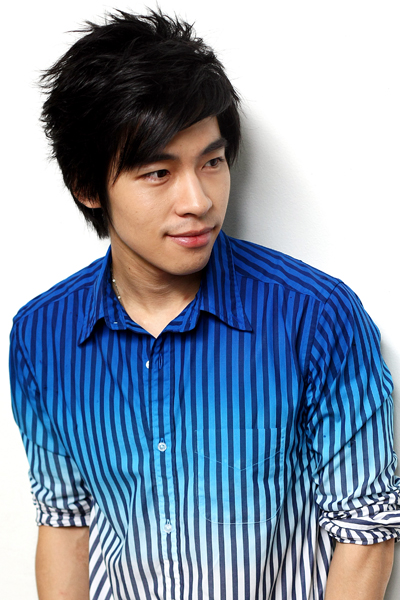
Thai actor-musician Nat Sakdatorn in a blue ombré-dyed shirt with black stripes

Ombré /ˈɒmbreɪ/ (literally "shaded" in French) is the blending of one color hue to another, usually moving tints and shades from light to dark. It has become a popular feature for hair coloring, nail art, and even baking, in addition to its uses in home decorating and graphic design.

In contrast to ombré, sombré is a much softer and gradual shading of one color to another.

== In fashion ==
=== History ===
Using shading or creating an ombré effect is ubiquitous. For instance in fabric printing, a special printing block, called a "rainbowed" block, was used in the early 19th century to produce textiles with graduated color designs. Ombré as a textile treatment came back into fashion in around 1840 and was used throughout the 19th century. In machine embroidery, an ombré effect was achieved by dyeing the threads in graded colors beforehand.

=== 21st century ===
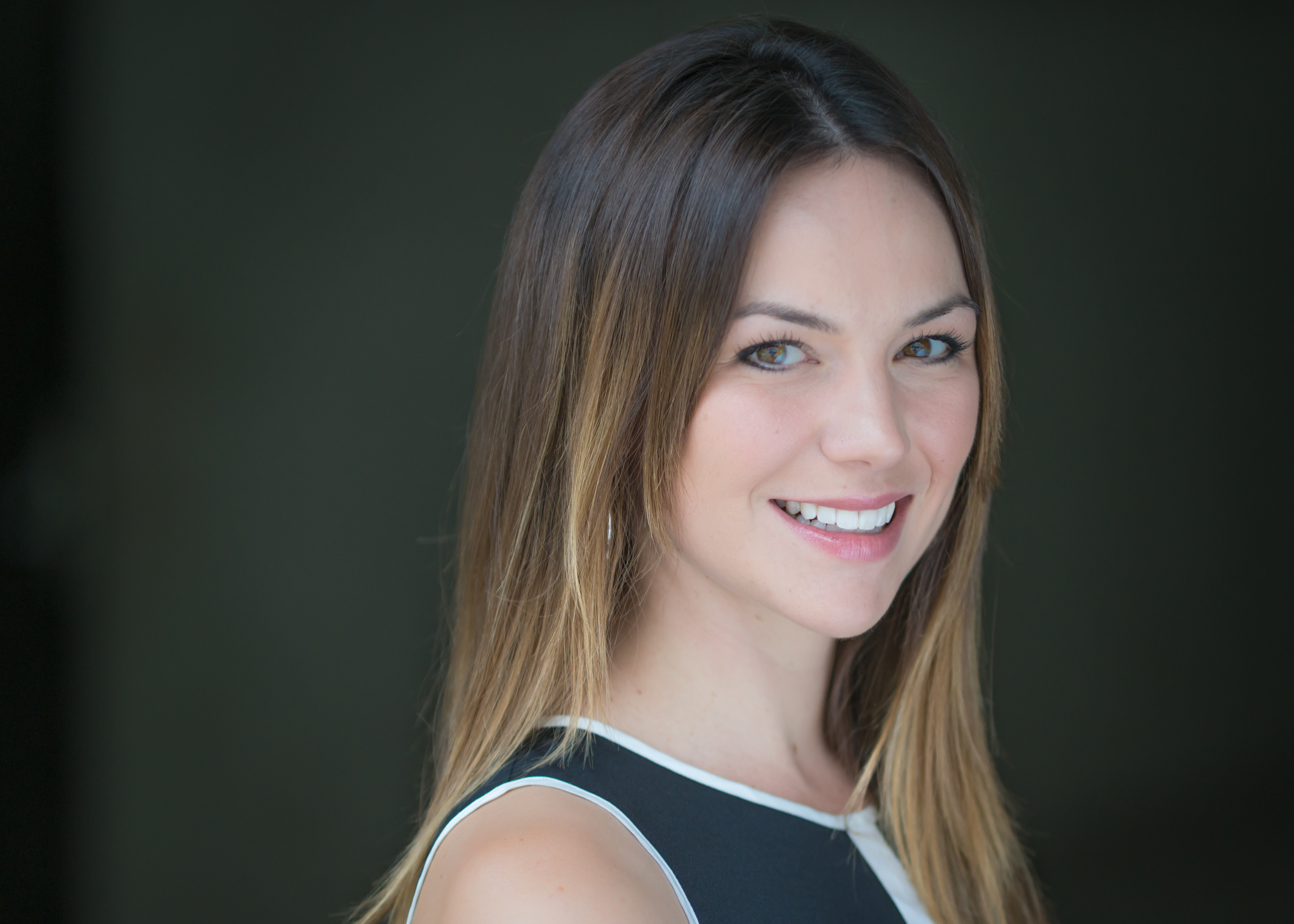
A woman with ombré hair

“Ombré” as a hair-coloring technique had been popularized in 2000 when the singer Aaliyah had her hair dyed in a subtle gradual fade from black at the roots to lighter towards the hair tips. As of 2010, the ombré hair trend was still popular. The style has been adopted by many celebrities, such as Britney Spears, Alexa Chung, Lauren Conrad, Vanessa Hudgens, Drew Barrymore, Beyoncé, and even Jared Leto, among others. One stylist found that the ombré hairstyle requires very little upkeep, making it easier for it to remain on trend. While ombre was initially the gradual lightening of the hair from dark to light, it has expanded to take on various other techniques, including the fading of a natural color from the roots to a more unnatural color (such as turquoise or lavender) at the tips.

The popularization of ombré hair encouraged the spread of this technique to other facets of beauty, such as nail art. The adoption of the ombré nails trend by celebrities such as Lauren Conrad, Victoria Beckham, and Katy Perry, helped popularise it.

== Home ==
Following the early 21st-century trend, many popular home decorators have incorporated ombré into their home decorating styles. Ombré can be used in many products from textiles to glassware, and as a wall-painting technique, where walls are painted in colors graduating to a lighter or darker tone towards the other end. Martha Stewart describes the gentle progression of color in ombré as a transition from wakefulness to slumber. David Kohn Architects have explored the ombré effect in the design of the floor tiling of the interior of an apartment, Carrer Avinyó, Barcelona. The tile pattern is graded in colour from green at one end of the apartment to red at the other to differentiate the two owners' private spaces. The encaustic tiles were manufactured by Mosaics Martí, suppliers of tiles to Antoni Gaudí.

== Baking ==
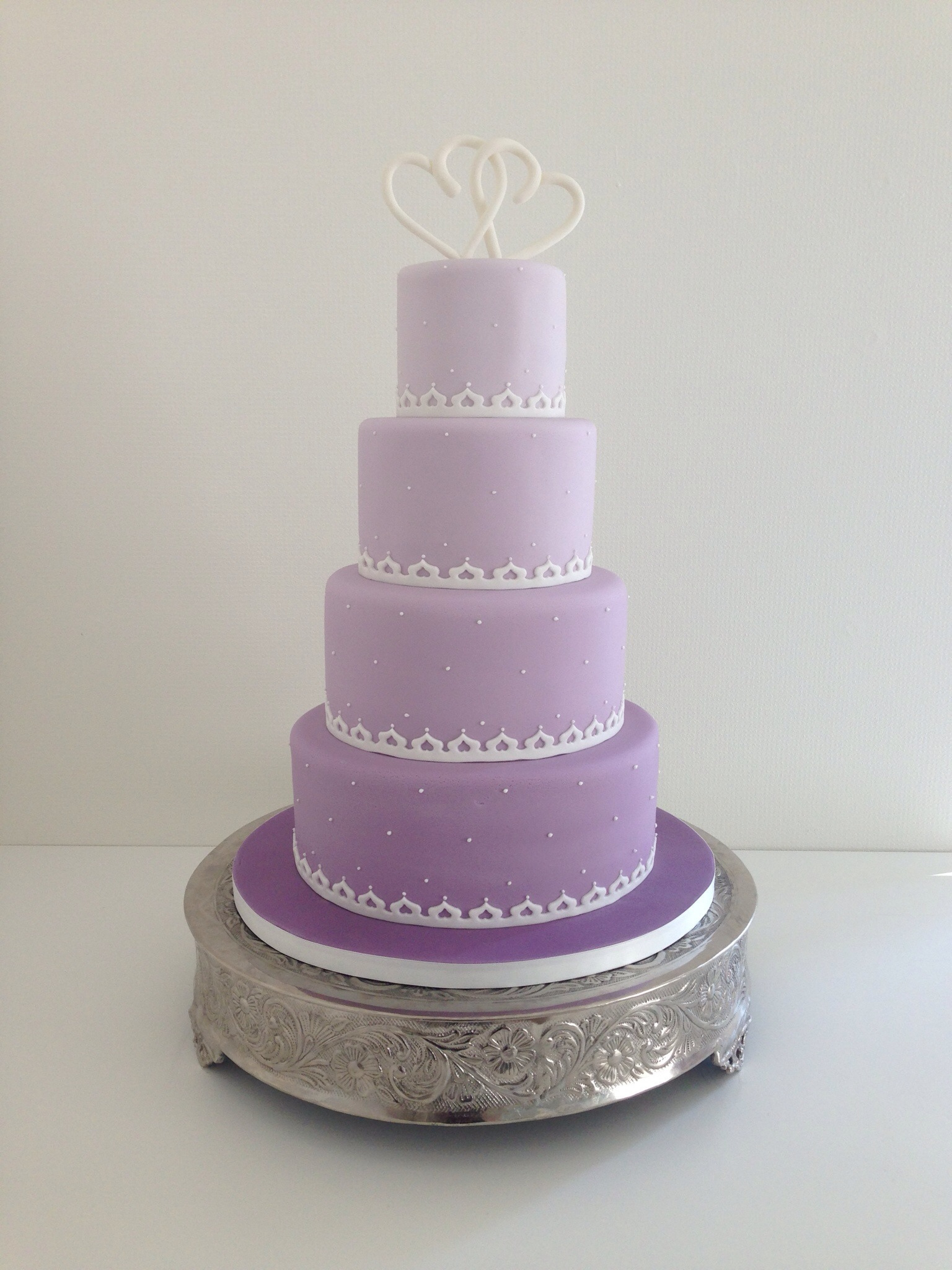
A cake with purple ombré frosting

In baking, ombré effects are typically achieved through applied techniques such as frosting on a cake, but baking individual cake layers in graduated tones from light to dark is possible. The effect can also be achieved by dyeing and stacking the layers of a cake in the ombré fade.

== Makeup ==
Due to the colour range available for different types of cosmetic products, an ombré effect can be achieved by blending two or more shades together on the eyes, lips, or cheeks. The gradient from dark to light is similar to the practice of contouring, where different tints and shades of natural skin tones are blended, but differs in that contouring is often intended to artificially sculpt the face, whereas ombré can be said to simply mean the blending of any two or more shades, natural or otherwise.

== See also ==
- Color gradient
