= Dip dye =

Hair-coloring style that involves dipping the ends of the hair into dye

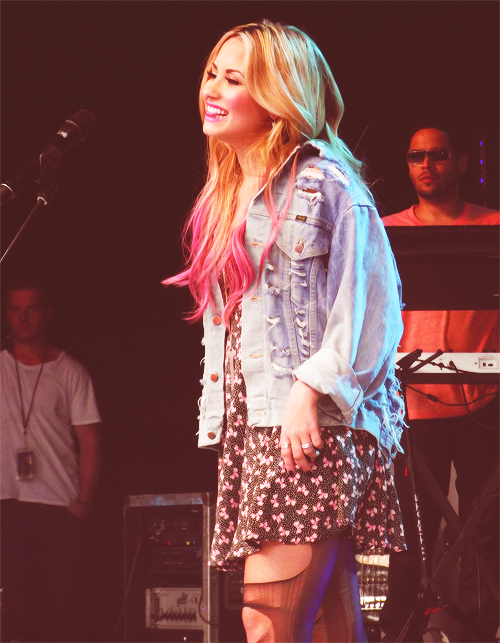
Demi Lovato with a dip dye

Dip dye (also known as tip dyeing) is a hair coloring style that involves dipping the ends of the hair into dye. The dye used can be naturally or brightly colored, the latter being the more popular choice. The method has become increasingly popular as a result of social media and use by celebrities. Dip dye originates from the process of tie dyeing clothing (especially T-shirts).

Dip-dyeing and the ombré hairstyle are similar. However, dip dyeing usually involves brighter neon colors and a less smooth gradient in color than an ombre style, which is typically a more blended and natural coloration. Another similar hair coloring technique that is confusing is balayage because it is so similar to Ombré, but looks like "growing-out" highlights.

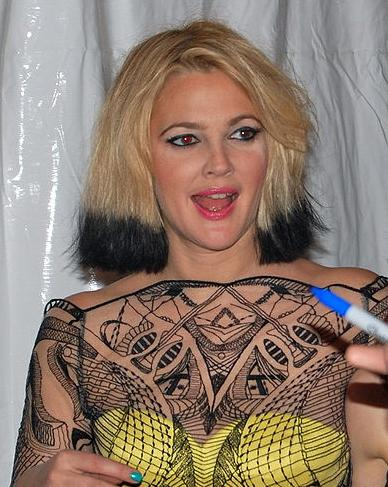
Drew Barrymore with dip dyed hair

== Trends ==
Dip dye hair is one of the biggest trends of the decade with hairstyles. Many celebrities have been seen with this idea of color fading in the hair. Celebrities like Lea Michele and Vanessa Hudgens have represented this trend. Dip dye is similar to the ombre and balayage styles that have a color fade in the hair. These are all ways to color hair without using the highlighting or dyeing processes that use foils. They tend to have more natural looking styles than the highlighting processes.
