= Prodan (dye) =

Names
- Preferred IUPAC name 1-[6-(Dimethylamino)naphthalen-2-yl]propan-1-one
- Other names: Prodan; 1-[6-(Dimethylamino)-2-naphthalenyl]-1-propanone

Identifiers
CAS Number	70504-01-7
3D model (JSmol)	Interactive image
Beilstein Reference	2723587
ChEBI	CHEBI:51909
ChemSpider	96896
PubChem CID	107729
UNII	3KRL7R0ZB7
CompTox Dashboard (EPA)	DTXSID60990711
- InChI: InChI=1S/C15H17NO/c1-4-15(17)13-6-5-12-10-14(16(2)3)8-7-11(12)9-13/h5-10H,4H2,1-3H3
- SMILES: CCC(=O)C1=CC2=C(C=C1)C=C(C=C2)N(C)C

Properties
Chemical formula	C_{15}H_{17}NO
Molar mass	227.307 g·mol^{−1}
Melting point	137 °C (279 °F; 410 K)

Hazards
- Occupational safety and health (OHS/OSH)
Main hazards	May cause skin/eye irritation
Safety data sheet (SDS)	SDS
- Except where otherwise noted, data are given for materials in their standard state (at 25 °C [77 °F], 100 kPa). Infobox references

Prodan is a fluorescent dye (a naphthalene derivative) used as a membrane probe with environment-sensitive coloration, as well as a non-covalently bonding probe for proteins.

Prodan was proposed as a membrane dye by Weber and Farris in 1979. Since then, multiple derivatives have been introduced, such as lypophilic Laurdan (derivative of lauric acid) and thiol-reactive Badan (bromoacetic acid derivative) and Acrylodan.

Being a push-pull dye, Prodan has a large excited-state dipole moment and consequently high sensibility to the polarity of its environment (solvent or cell membrane, including the physical state of surrounding phospholipids). Usually it is concentrated at the surface of the membrane, with some degree of penetration. Excited-state relaxation of prodan is sensitive to whether the linkage between phospholipid hydrocarbon tails and the glycerol backbone is of ether or ester type. Therefore, many studies exploited this sensitivity to explore coexisting lipid domains in dual-wavelength ratio measurements, to detect non-bilayer lipid phases, to map membrane structure changes. However, Prodan presence itself is found to change the structure of membranes.

In proteins, Prodan and Badan are quenched by non-covalent bonding with tryptophan and the oxidation of it by excited Prodan/Badan.

Absorption of Prodan lies in the UV range (361 nm in methanol), but two-photon excitation techniques have been successfully applied. Fluorescence wavelength is highly sensitive to the polarity of the environment. For example, the emission wavelength shifts from 380 nm in cyclohexane to 450 nm in N,N-dimethylformamide to 498 nm in methanol to 520 nm in water. Cyclic voltammetry shows a reversible reduction peak at —1.85 V in acetonitrile and a quasi-reversible one at —0.88 in aqueous buffer (pH 7.3) (vs. NHE). Contrariwise, excited-state reduction potential is +1.6 V in the acetonitrile and +0.6 V in water (vs. NHE). Photostability of Prodan and Laurdan in low-polaritry environments is limited due to undergoing an intersystem crossing in the excited state, with subsequent reactions with triplet oxygen (this also diminishes its quantum yield, which is 0.95 in ethanol but only 0.03 in cyclohexane).
