= 2,4-Diaminotoluene =

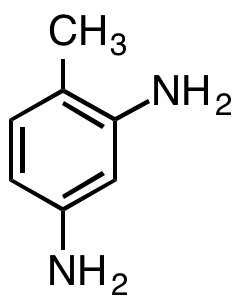

Names
- Preferred IUPAC name 4-Methylbenzene-1,3-diamine
- Other names 2,4-Toluenediamine

Identifiers
| CAS Number | 95-80-7 |
| 3D model (JSmol) | Interactive image |
| ChEBI | CHEBI:34237 |
| ChEMBL | ChEMBL541230 |
| ChemSpider | 6991 |
| ECHA InfoCard | 100.002.231 |
| EC Number | 202-453-1 |
| KEGG | C14401 |
| PubChem CID | 7261 |
| RTECS number | XS9445000 |
| UNII | IS1AKN4HYB |
| UN number | 1709 |
| CompTox Dashboard (EPA) | DTXSID4020402 |
- InChI: InChI=1S/C7H10N2/c1-5-2-3-6(8)4-7(5)9/h2-4H,8-9H2,1H3 Key: VOZKAJLKRJDJLL-UHFFFAOYSA-N
- SMILES: CC1=C(C=C(C=C1)N)N

Properties
| Chemical formula | C_{7}H_{10}N_{2} |
| Molar mass | 122.171 g·mol^{−1} |
| Appearance | White solid |
| Density | 1.521 g/cm^{3} |
| Melting point | 97 to 99 °C (207 to 210 °F; 370 to 372 K) |
| Boiling point | 283 to 285 °C (541 to 545 °F; 556 to 558 K) |

Hazards
- NIOSH (US health exposure limits)
| PEL (Permissible) | none |
| REL (Recommended) | Ca |
| IDLH (Immediate danger) | Ca [N.D.] |
- Except where otherwise noted, data are given for materials in their standard state (at 25 °C [77 °F], 100 kPa). Infobox references

2,4-Diaminotoluene is an aromatic organic compound with the formula C_{6}H_{3}(NH_{2})_{2}CH_{3}. It is one isomer of six with this formula. It is a white solid, although commercial samples are often yellow-tan.

== Preparation ==
It is prepared by hydrogenation of 2,4-dinitrotoluene using a nickel catalyst. Commercial samples often contain up to 20% of the 2,6-isomer.

A laboratory method involves reduction of 2,4-dinitrotoluene with iron powder.

== Use ==
It is mainly used to manufacture toluene diisocyanate, which is a key raw material in polyurethane chemistry. It is still the starting material used when non-phosgene methods of production of toluene diisocyanate are used.

It is also a degradation product of polyurethane materials produced using toluene diisocyanate.

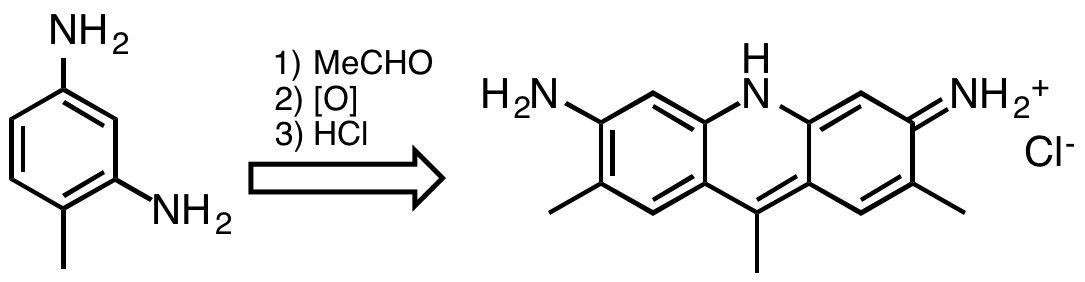
Synthesis of C.I. Basic Yellow 9, an acridine dye.

Its reaction with benzenediazonium chloride gives the cationic azo dye Basic Orange 1. Condensation of 2,4-diaminotoluene with acetaldehyde gives the acridine dye called Basic Yellow 9.

== Toxicity ==
Aromatic amines in general often are classed as toxic and so the toxicity profile of this species has been studied. It has received more in depth study in the 21st century.
