= 2,5-Diaminotoluene =

Names
- Preferred IUPAC name 2-Methylbenzene-1,4-diamine
- Other names 2-Methyl-1,4-benzenediamine; Toluene-2,5-diamine; 2,5-Diaminotoluene

Identifiers
CAS Number	95-70-5
3D model (JSmol)	Interactive image
Beilstein Reference	774521
ChEBI	CHEBI:53619
ChemSpider	6982
ECHA InfoCard	100.002.221
EC Number	202-442-1
KEGG	C19386
PubChem CID	7252
UNII	24JO8Z0RJU
CompTox Dashboard (EPA)	DTXSID6029123
- InChI: InChI=1S/C7H10N2/c1-5-4-6(8)2-3-7(5)9/h2-4H,8-9H2,1H3 Key: OBCSAIDCZQSFQH-UHFFFAOYSA-N
- SMILES: CC1=C(C=CC(=C1)N)N

Properties
Chemical formula	C_{7}H_{10}N_{2}
Molar mass	122.17
Appearance	off white crystals
Density	1.107 g/cm^{3}
Melting point	64 °C (147 °F; 337 K)
Boiling point	273 °C (523 °F; 546 K)

Hazards
- GHS labelling
Pictograms	(GHS06: Toxic) (GHS07: Exclamation mark) (GHS09: Environmental hazard)
Signal word	Danger
Hazard statements	H301, H312, H317, H319, H332, H411
Precautionary statements	P261, P264, P270, P271, P272, P273, P280, P301+P310, P302+P352, P304+P312, P304+P340, P305+P351+P338, P312, P321, P322, P330, P333+P313, P337+P313, P363, P391, P405, P501
Flash point	no
- NIOSH (US health exposure limits)
PEL (Permissible)	none
REL (Recommended)	Ca
IDLH (Immediate danger)	Ca [N.D.]
- Except where otherwise noted, data are given for materials in their standard state (at 25 °C [77 °F], 100 kPa). verify (what is ?) Infobox references

2,5-Diaminotoluene is an organic compound with the formula C_{6}H_{3}(NH_{2})_{2}CH_{3}. It is one isomer of six with this formula. 2,5-Diaminotoluene is a colorless crystalline solid, although commercial samples are often colored owing to air oxidation. It is commonly used in hair coloring.

== Formation and use ==
2,5-Diaminotoluene is prepared through electrolytic reduction of 2,5-dinitrotoluene. Other methods include the reductive cleavage of 4-amino-2,3'-dimethylazobenzene as well as the condensation of 2-amino-1-methylbenzene and toluene-4-sulphonyl chloride to produce 4-toluenesulphono-2-toluidide which is then coupled with diazotized aminobenzenesulphonic acid and reduced.

2,5-Diaminotoluene is a substitute for phenylenediamine (1,4-diaminobenzene) in commercial hair dyes. It is preferred because of its lower toxicity. However, many home hair dyes still use phenylenediamine. In these applications, these diamines function as a primary intermediate, which means that it is first oxidized with hydrogen peroxide and then combined with a coupler to form the hair dye. 2,5-Diaminotoluene is commonly used to produce black, drab and warm browns, and shades of blonde and gray hair dyes.

2,5-Diaminotoluene is also known to be used in the production of dyes for textiles, furs, leathers, biological stains and indicators, wood stains, and pigments. Two examples of dyes produced by 2,5-diaminotoluene are Cl Basic Red 2 and Cl Acid Brown 103.
