= Combe Incorporated =

American personal care company

- Company type: Private
- Industry: Cosmetics
- Founded: 1949; 77 years ago New York, U.S.
- Founder: Ivan Combe
- Headquarters: White Plains, New York, U.S.
- Area served: 100+
- Products: Personal care Haircare
- Owner: Combe family
- Number of employees: 500 (2020)
- Website: combe.com

Combe Incorporated is an American personal care company founded in 1949 by Ivan Combe. Based in White Plains, New York, its products are sold in 100 countries on six continents. Combe primarily promoted his brand names over the company name. It owns numerous brands, including Just for Men, Sea-Bond, Vagisil, and Grecian Formula.

== History ==
Combe was the originator of the Clearasil brand in 1950, then sold the rights to it in 1961 to Richardson-Merrell. In 1952, the company relocated its offices from Manhattan to White Plains, New York.

In June 1974, Combe opened its first manufacturing plant in Rantoul, Illinois. The company launched Vagisil the same year. In 1987, Just for Men was introduced.

Founder Ivan Combe died in 2000, and was then succeeded by his son, Chris.

In October 2002, Combe acquired J.B. Williams, adding Brylcreem, Aqua Velva and Cepacol to its brand stable

In January 2011, Combe sold its cough remedy and skin care business to Reckitt Benckiser, and its foot care business (including Odor-Eaters) to Blistex.

In 2018, the Environmental Defense Fund and other consumer groups filed a complaint with the Food and Drug Administration to force Combe to remove highly toxic lead acetate from Grecian Formula and other hair dyes. As of January 2022, lead acetate is banned, with bismuth citrate used as its replacement due to the mandate.

In December 2020, Combe invested in Virtue Labs, a biotech hair care brand, formulated with a patented bioidentical keratin protein.

In May 2023, Combe acquired BioFilm and its Astroglide brand from the family of its creator, rocket scientist Daniel X. Wray.
