= Velva =

Velva may refer to:

- Velva Darnell (1938–2014), American country and pop singer
- Velva, North Dakota, a city in McHenry County, North Dakota, United States
- Velva Elaine Rudd (1910–1999), an American botanist, specializing in tropical legumes
- Velva (Castiglione Chiavarese), a frazione of Castiglione Chiavarese, Italy
- Aqua Velva, a line of men's grooming products
- Aqua Velva (cocktail)
- Julia Velva, a Roman woman from Eboracum
