= Ivan Combe =

- Born: Ivan DeBlois Combe; April 21, 1911; Fremont, Iowa
- Died: January 11, 2000 (aged 88); Greenwich, Connecticut
- Education: Northwestern University (B.S., 1933); Northwestern University School of Law (1936)
- Occupations: businessman, entrepreneur, and inventor
- Known for: Clearasil, Odor Eaters

Ivan DeBlois Combe (April 21, 1911 – January 11, 2000) was the American inventor of personal-care products, most notably Clearasil and Odor Eaters. In 1949 he established his eponymous company Combe Incorporated in White Plains, New York.

== Early life and career ==
Ivan DeBlois Combe was born in Fremont, Iowa, on April 21, 1911. Combe graduated from Northwestern University in 1933, and earned a law degree from the Northwestern University School of Law in 1936.

He became a salesman for Hydrox Ice Cream and the Wilbur Shoe Polish company before moving to New York City to work for the Young & Rubicam advertising agency. He later joined Pharmacraft, a drug manufacturer, but in 1949, left his vice president position to create his own company.

== Death ==
Combe died in Greenwich, Connecticut on January 11, 2000.

== Legacy ==
After his death, Northwestern University named the Combe Tennis Center in his honor.
