= Just for Men =

American-based men's care brand

- Just For Men hair color product packaging
- Produced by: Combe Incorporated
- Country: United States
- Introduced: 1987; 39 years ago
- Markets: Argentina, Australia, Brazil, Canada, Chile, Germany, India, Ireland, Italy, Israel, Mexico, Netherlands, New Zealand, Singapore, Spain, Thailand, Turkey, United Kingdom, and United States
- Website: justformen.com

Just for Men is an American-based multi-national men's care brand focusing on hair color designed for and marketed to men and manufactured by Combe Incorporated.

== Advertising ==
Just for Men television advertising in the United States features sports celebrities Walt Frazier and Keith Hernandez as sportscasters, whose ads have aired for over five and a half years. A January 2008 spot had them visiting a grey-bearded Emmitt Smith in an NFL style nursing home where Frazier proclaims "Your 'stache is trash!" and "The beard is weird!"

Additionally, Just for Men often sponsors sports events, specific examples including the PGA Tour's "Right on Target Shot" segment and WWE's "Rewind" and "Slam of the Week".

== See also ==
- Grecian Formula
