= Thomas Goulard =

French surgeon (1697–1784)

- Born: 1697; Saint-Nicolas-de-la-Grave, France
- Died: 1784 (aged 86–87)
- Occupations: Surgeon, anatomist
- Known for: Goulard's Extract

Thomas Goulard (1697–1784) was a French surgeon famous for Goulard's extract, a solution of lead(II) acetate and lead(II) oxide which was formerly used as an astringent. Goulard was a surgeon and anatomist in Montpellier who specialized in genitourinary disorders. His best known written work is titled Oeuvres de Chirurgie.
