= It's a Jersey Thing =

- South Park episode
- Episode no.: Season 14; Episode 9
- Directed by: Trey Parker
- Written by: Trey Parker
- Production code: 1409
- Original air date: October 13, 2010

Guest appearance
- Robert Amstler as Arnold Schwarzenegger

Episode chronology
← Previous "Poor and Stupid"	Next → "Insheeption"
- South Park season 14

"It's a Jersey Thing" is the ninth episode of the fourteenth season of the American animated television series South Park, and the 204th episode of the series overall. It premiered on Comedy Central in the United States on October 13, 2010. In the episode, New Jersey is rapidly taking over the nation one state at a time and their next stop is South Park. As the Jerseyites spill into Colorado and approach South Park, the town stands strong against the onslaught.

The episode was written and directed by series co-creator Trey Parker. In its original American broadcast on October 13, 2010, "It's a Jersey Thing" was watched by 3.253 million viewers, according to the Nielsen Media Research. It was the highest-viewed scripted show. It received a 1.9 rating/5% share among adult viewers between ages 18 and 49. This is the first episode to be announced immediately following another's airing since "The Passion of the Jew"; all other episodes since Season 9 have been announced on a Friday or a Monday. However, it is not the first to release a preview clip right after the previous episode. The episode "200" had a preview clip released for it the day after the episode before it, "You Have 0 Friends", was aired (even though that preview clip was not used in the final episode).

The episode revolves around the invasion of South Park by the Jerseyites, based on characters from the MTV reality show, Jersey Shore and from The Real Housewives of New Jersey on Bravo. Footage from the opening credits of the MTV series is used.

== Plot ==
When a family from New Jersey moves into South Park, Sharon invites the family into their home for dinner. The tacky Jersey woman, Teresa Giudice from the Real Housewives of New Jersey, becomes very obnoxious very quickly and starts to insult Sharon and her friends, leading Sharon to insult her calmly. Teresa goes crazy and flips the dinner table and shouts expletives at Sharon, but is calmed down by her husband Joe.

Soon after, many people from New Jersey move into South Park and everyone starts to get annoyed with them. Randy calls a meeting at the Park County Community Center, where he reveals that New Jersey is trying to take over the country and already has everything east of the Rocky Mountains, with all of Colorado in danger of becoming "West Jersey". Meanwhile, after another altercation with the New Jersey housewives and Sharon at the hair salon, Sheila reveals that she is originally from New Jersey after defending Sharon from the other ladies and that she was once a notorious party girl nicknamed "S-Woww-Tittybang". When the other families find out, Cartman shuns Kyle from their group, stating that if he is Jersey (along with being Jewish and ginger, which Cartman already hates him for), he is all bad.

Later that night, Kyle (in a parody of the first transformation scene in Teen Wolf), seemingly unable to control his actions, begins to cut and grease his bushy Jewfro into a style similar to Pauly D's hairstyle from Jersey Shore. He is even more shocked to find Sheila now fully decked out in this fashion; Sheila tells Kyle that "it's not so bad, some people like the Jersey look", only to have Ike scream and faint after looking into the room and spotting them. Sheila reveals to her son that he's technically from New Jersey: Kyle was conceived in New Jersey and during the first two months that Sheila was pregnant with him, she and Kyle's father, Gerald, were living with Sheila's parents in Newark, New Jersey. Whenever either of them is around New Jersey influences, she says, they will start to exhibit the same behavior.

Cartman's usual distrust of Kyle grows even stronger, since Kyle is now the "three J's" - "Jinger, Jersey and Jew", although Stan and Kenny don't seem to care and they just help out the other townspeople try to drive the Jerseyites out. Desperate for assistance, after having built a barricade of junk and handing out a stack of what appears to be lever-action rifles and muskets from crates of mysterious origin, Randy pleads for help from California Governor Arnold Schwarzenegger, who tells him that the state cannot provide any assistance due to budget problems and general lack of concern (then Randy tries telling him that "if Colorado falls, you're next", only to be told that actually Utah and Nevada stand between California and the invasion). Likewise, Japan, along with every other state and country, also refuses to help. At this point, Randy realizes they should get help from their enemies: al-Qaeda. The townspeople are shocked at and deeply against this idea, saying that the feelings of the families of the victims of 9/11 matter for "another ten months" (the tenth anniversary of the attacks).

But then Randy and other men are called to the bar, where in a satire of horror movie clichés, they encounter Snooki, who is depicted as a sex-crazed, barely-humanoid goblin. In desperation, Randy videotapes a request for help from al-Qaeda and sends it to Osama bin Laden. As the townspeople arm themselves and barricade the streets to stave off the invasion, Cartman asks Kyle to meet him at the Sizzler, with the intent of locking him in the meat freezer so he can't help the Jerseyites. Once Cartman opens the freezer, Snooki springs out and begins to rape him and Dog Poo. Kyle now fully transforms into a guido, complete with rings and gold neck chain and calling himself "Kyley B", and proceeds to insult and hit Snooki, until she flees the restaurant—which Cartman actually thanks Kyle for.

In the streets, Randy violently interrogates Michael "The Situation" Sorrentino, who can only answer "It's just a Jersey thing, you know, you just gotta be from Jersey to get it." The townspeople hold off the hordes of Jerseyites until their ammunition runs out and their defense seems futile. However, just as the invaders begin to overrun the barricades, a fleet of al-Qaeda suicide pilots fly in and crash their planes into the ground, killing them all in a parody of Saving Private Ryan.

At a town meeting soon after, Randy proudly thanks bin Laden for his help in stopping the invasion and reveals that their victory has inspired the rest of the East Coast to drive the Jerseyites back to their own state. With the Jerseyites defeated, Cartman tells Kyle "You're a monster, but you're my little monster" - and just as bin Laden receives a hero medal, a Special Forces commando comes in and kills him. At first, the people are shocked, but then Randy happily exclaims "We got him!"

== Production and cultural references ==
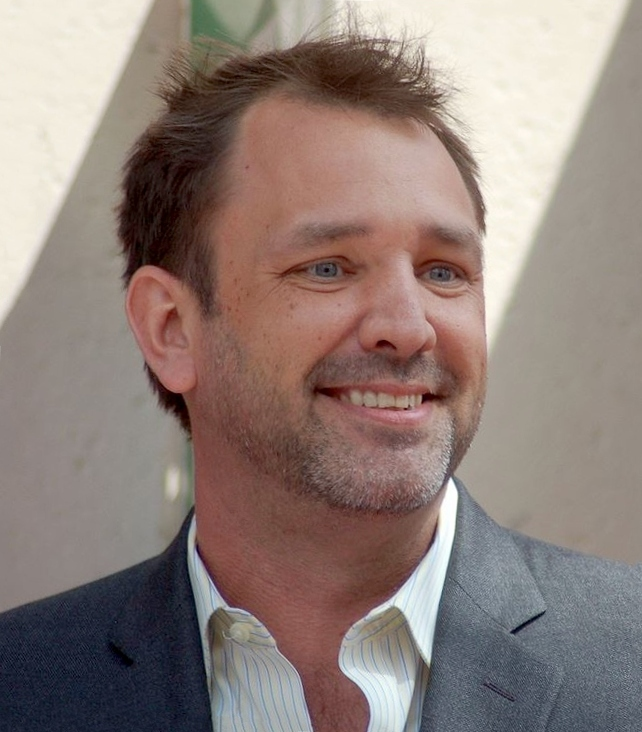
Series co-creator Trey Parker (pictured) wrote and directed "It's a Jersey Thing"

"It's a Jersey Thing" was written and directed by series co-creator Trey Parker. It first aired on October 13, 2010 in the United States on Comedy Central. Like most South Park episodes, "It's a Jersey Thing" was first conceived by Parker and fellow co-creator Matt Stone within a week of the episode's broadcast date.

The episode was originally called "New Jersey". The title was later changed to "It Came from New Jersey" before being finalized as "It's a Jersey Thing".

Kyle's transformation to becoming a Jerseyite is a reference to Teen Wolf.

The scene at the beginning in which Teresa Giudice becomes angry and flips the dinner table at Sharon is a parody of The Real Housewives of New Jersey season one episode six "Finale" involving the final dinner scene.

In 2011, Comedy Central re-aired the episode, along with "Osama bin Laden Has Farty Pants", after the killing of Osama bin Laden.

== Reception ==
=== Ratings ===
In its original American broadcast on October 13, 2010, "It's a Jersey Thing" was watched by 3.253 million viewers, according to Nielsen Media Research, making it the most watched cable television show of the night. The episode received a 2.1 rating/4 share, meaning it was seen by 2.1 percent of the population, and 4 percent of people watching television at the time of its broadcast. Among adult viewers between ages 18 and 49, the episode received a 1.9 rating/5 share, rising one tenth in the ratings resulting in approximately 100, 000 more viewers than the previous episode. Among male viewers between ages 18 and 34, the episode received a 3.9 rating/13 share.

=== Critical response ===
The episode received largely positive reviews. Katla McGlynn of The Huffington Post, referred to the revelation of Snooki as the best moment of the episode. Ramsey Isler of IGN rated the episode with a 7.5/10 saying "the fact that the majority of the story was just a half-hearted satire of Jersey shows that Robot Chicken could've done better, is a sign that something's amiss." Brad Trechak of HuffPost TV stated in his review "As a New Jersey native, I should have been really offended by tonight's episode of South Park. Sadly, I was laughing too hard to notice." He also felt the show "walks a line between humor and bad taste". Sean O'Neal of The A.V. Club rated the episode with a B. He compared the episode to "South Park Is Gay!" and "Stupid Spoiled Whore Video Playset" although he stated that ""It's a Jersey Thing" may not prove to have the lasting appeal of the aforementioned" episodes.

=== Reaction from those spoofed ===
Despite being ridiculed and spoofed by the show, the reactions from the people who were spoofed were mostly positive. Nicole "Snooki" Polizzi wrote on Twitter, "Snooki want smoosh smoosh. [I'm] going to have nightmares tonight lmao!!! [We've] officially made it...". Angelina Pivarnick posted a picture of Snooki as depicted in the episode and commented "Haaaaa wat a jokee. Lil gremlin". DJ Pauly D posted a shot of the Jersey-fied Kyle after a fan said they were "like twins", while The Situation posted a link to the episode while commenting "Southpark Situation! Hilarious!". Castmate Vinny Guadagnino commented "...my face was on South Park, im good now".

Teresa Giudice from The Real Housewives of New Jersey initially claimed to have not watched the episode, but later claimed she was "honored to be mocked by them", especially in light of the other mockeries. Former co-castmember Danielle Staub was pleasantly surprised that "...it wasn't just me being made fun of for a change. You realize you're something else when you're being made into a cartoon. It's pretty funny."

== Home media ==
"It's a Jersey Thing", along with the thirteen other episodes from South Park's fourteenth season, were released on a three-disc DVD set and two-disc Blu-ray set in the United States on April 26, 2011.
