= Vagisil =

Cream to treat vaginal irritation

Vagisil is an American brand of over-the-counter cream used to treat vulvar itching and irritation. It is produced by Combe Incorporated, a company based in White Plains, New York and was introduced in 1974.

The active ingredients are benzocaine (5%), a local anesthetic which reduces the itching, and resorcinol (2%), an antiseptic which treats the skin irritation.

== Products ==
In February, 2021, Vagisil launched new products labelled OMV! which are scented wipes, cleansers and anti itch creams for vaginas and vulvas. The marketing is directed at teenagers, which has been criticized on social media by doctors. OB/GYNs Jen Gunter, Chavone Momon-Nelson and Jocelyn Fitzgerald all expressed worry that the advertising campaign will make teens ashamed of their vaginas and that the treatment will cause issues such as irritation and allergic reaction. They worry that the teens may not seek medical advice for real issues, such as yeast infections that should not be treated with Vagisil. Gunter and Momon-Nelson agree that the vagina should be left alone and does not need special cleaners or refreshing. Vagisil responded to this criticism explaining that their products have an appropriate pH level for external use in the vulvar area and have been tested by independent dermatologists and gynecologists. A spokesperson for Vagisil stated that their products are not for everyone and that they created OMV! in response to active young women who have expressed "...worry about period hygiene and odours". Gunter counters stating menstruation is natural and vaginas are not supposed to smell like the OMV! scents roses or vanilla-clementine.

== In popular culture ==
Vagisil has been the subject of various comedy routines.

In the South Park episode "Poor and Stupid", Cartman sees a commercial for Vagisil which lists short-term memory loss as a possible side effect. He then goes to a pharmacy with Butters Stotch to consume large quantities of the cream in an attempt to become "dumb enough" to perform well in NASCAR races.

Vagisil appears as an alleged sponsor of "Ladies' Bowling" in a series of sketches on the TV show Saturday Night Live. One of the sports commenters in the sketches repeatedly advertises the product with highly inappropriate marketing slogans.

In the TV show The Big Bang Theory, a Vagisil coupon that came in the mail to Sheldon Cooper appears at the end of the second episode of the seventh season, which he presents as a gift to Penny with a comment: "Think of me when you apply it".

In the movie Major League, aging Starting Pitcher Eddie Harris illegally uses Vagisil to increase the drop on his "Curveball".
