= Oak Brook, Illinois =

Suburb of Chicago

- Village
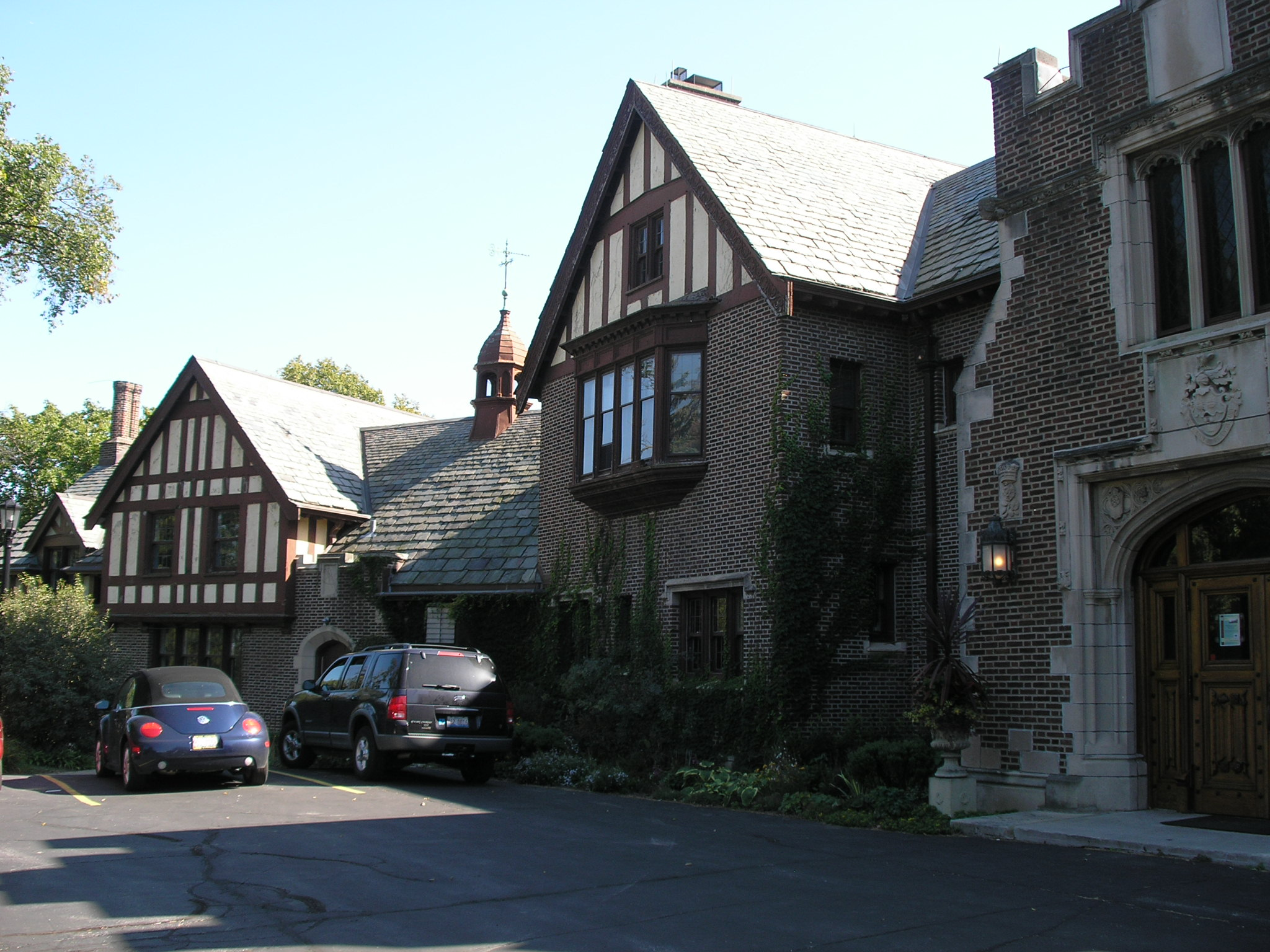
- Mayslake Peabody Estate

- Flag Seal

- Location of Oak Brook in DuPage and Cook Counties, Illinois
- Coordinates: 41°50′14″N 87°57′06″W
- Country: United States
- State: Illinois
- Counties: DuPage, Cook
- Townships: York, Downers Grove, Proviso
- Incorporated: 1958

Government
  - Type: Council–manager

Area
  - Total: 8.30 sq mi (21.49 km^{2})
  - Land: 7.98 sq mi (20.66 km^{2})
  - Water: 0.32 sq mi (0.83 km^{2})
- Elevation: 666 ft (203 m)

Population (2020)
  - Total: 8,163
  - Density: 1,023.4/sq mi (395.15/km^{2})
- Time zone: UTC-6 (CST)
  - Summer (DST): UTC-5 (CDT)
- ZIP Code: 60523
- Area codes: 630 and 331
- FIPS code: 17-54534
- GNIS feature ID: 2399533

Oak Brook is a village in DuPage County and Cook County, Illinois, United States. The population was 8,163 at the 2020 census.

A suburb of Chicago, it contains the headquarters of Ace Hardware, Portillo's Restaurants, Blistex, Federal Signal, CenterPoint Properties, Sanford L.P., TreeHouse Foods, Lions Clubs International, the U.S. Census Bureau Chicago regional office, and former headquarters of McDonald's and Ferrara Candy. The Lizzadro Museum of Lapidary Art moved there in 2019.

== History ==
Oak Brook was originally known as Fullersburg, named after Ben Fuller, an early settler.

Oak Brook was incorporated as a village in 1958, due in large part to the efforts of Paul Butler, a prominent civic leader and landowner whose father had first moved to the vicinity in 1898 and opened a dairy farm shortly thereafter. Prior to incorporation, the name Oak Brook was used by local residents to distinguish their community from neighboring Hinsdale and Elmhurst, going back to the founding of the Oak Brook Civic Association almost two decades earlier.

The original boundaries were smaller than the present extent of the village, but a considerable amount of land was annexed soon after the founding of the village, including the land that is now the site of the Oakbrook Center shopping mall, which opened in 1962.

In 1964 Butler entered a joint venture with the Del E. Webb Corporation of Phoenix, Arizona, to increase development of the area. Webb's construction company constructed dozens of buildings in Oak Brook both commercial and residential. The Webb Corporation's involvement in the development of the village lasted into the late 1970s.

Paul Butler's interest in sport was reflected in the Oak Brook Sports Core, which features polo fields, a golf course (which was at one time the venue for the Western Open), swimming and tennis facilities, and other recreational facilities not commonly found in a village of this size.

== Geography ==
According to the 2021 census gazetteer files, Oak Brook has a total area of 8.29 square miles (21.47 km^{2}), of which 7.96 square miles (20.62 km^{2}) (or 96.11%) is land and 0.32 square miles (0.83 km^{2}) (or 3.89%) is water.

Oak Brook is located about 19 miles (31 km) west of the Chicago Loop (downtown Chicago).

Most of Oak Brook consists of residential subdivisions, with the exception of the Oakbrook Center shopping mall and other retail and office properties along 22nd Street and the Interstate 88 corridor in the northern part of the village.

== Demographics ==
Historical population
Census	Pop.	Note	%±
1960	324		—
1970	4,164		1,185.2%
1980	6,676		60.3%
1990	9,178		37.5%
2000	8,702		−5.2%
2010	7,883		−9.4%
2020	8,163		3.6%
U.S. Decennial Census; 2010 2020

=== Racial and ethnic composition ===
Oak Brook village, Illinois – Racial and ethnic composition Note: the US Census treats Hispanic/Latino as an ethnic category. This table excludes Latinos from the racial categories and assigns them to a separate category. Hispanics/Latinos may be of any race.
Race / Ethnicity (NH = Non-Hispanic)	Pop 2000	Pop 2010	Pop 2020	% 2000	% 2010	% 2020
White alone (NH)	6,480	5,395	4,648	74.47%	68.44%	56.94%
Black or African American alone (NH)	119	154	149	1.37%	1.95%	1.83%
Native American or Alaska Native alone (NH)	0	2	5	0.00%	0.03%	0.06%
Asian alone (NH)	1,750	1,830	2,678	20.11%	23.21%	32.81%
Pacific Islander alone (NH)	1	0	2	0.01%	0.00%	0.02%
Other race alone (NH)	6	3	40	0.07%	0.04%	0.49%
Mixed race or Multiracial (NH)	138	160	245	1.59%	2.03%	3.00%
Hispanic or Latino (any race)	208	339	396	2.39%	4.30%	4.85%
Total	8,702	7,883	8,163	100.00%	100.00%	100.00%

=== 2020 census ===
As of the 2020 census, Oak Brook had a population of 8,163, with 3,038 households and 2,320 families. The population density was 985.16 inhabitants per square mile (380.37/km^{2}). There were 3,308 housing units at an average density of 399.23 per square mile (154.14/km^{2}).

The median age was 55.1 years. 18.2% of residents were under the age of 18 and 35.5% of residents were 65 years of age or older. For every 100 females there were 91.4 males, and for every 100 females age 18 and over there were 89.2 males age 18 and over.

100.0% of residents lived in urban areas, while 0.0% lived in rural areas.

Of all households, 24.9% had children under the age of 18 living in them. 69.5% were married-couple households, 8.5% were households with a male householder and no spouse or partner present, and 20.3% were households with a female householder and no spouse or partner present. About 20.0% of all households were made up of individuals and 15.8% had someone living alone who was 65 years of age or older.

8.2% of housing units were vacant. The homeowner vacancy rate was 1.4% and the rental vacancy rate was 10.4%.

=== Income and poverty ===
The median income for a household in the village was $140,743, and the median income for a family was $175,500. Males had a median income of $136,125 versus $77,067 for females. The per capita income for the village was $79,838. About 2.0% of families and 4.2% of the population were below the poverty line, including 1.0% of those under age 18 and 5.6% of those age 65 or over.

== Economy ==
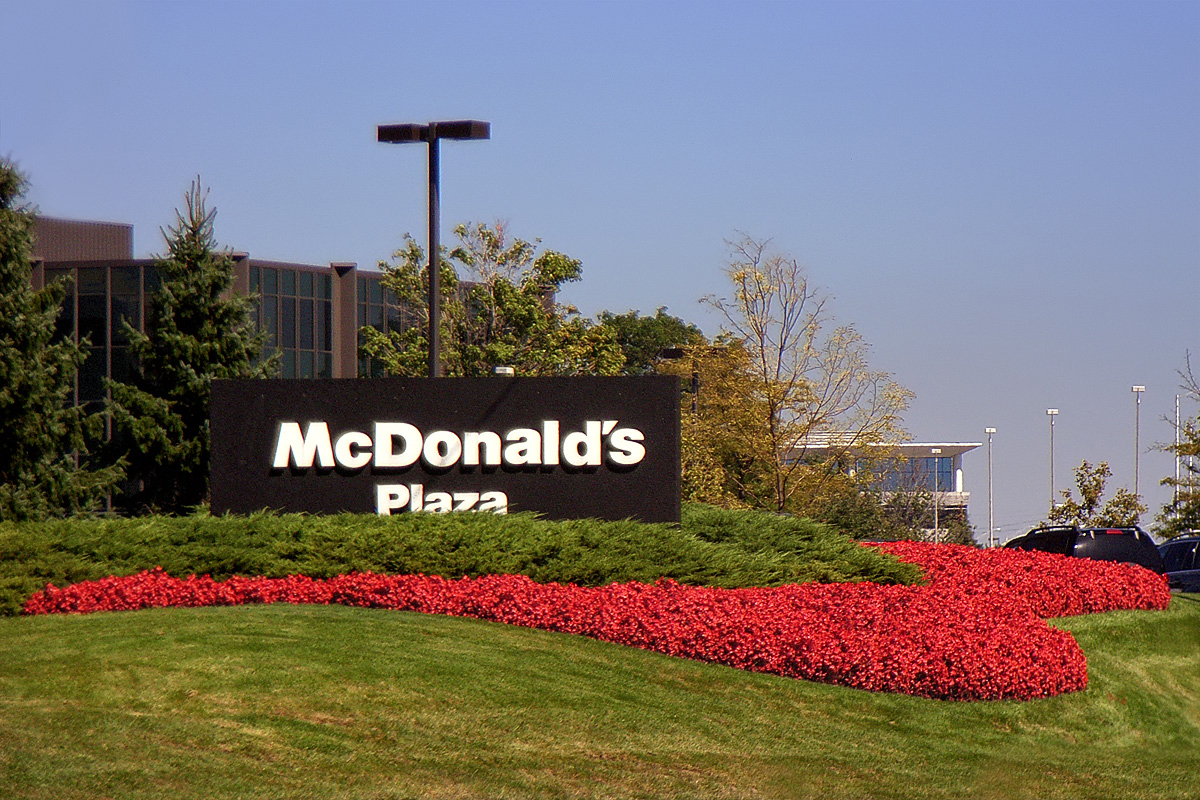
McDonald's Plaza, the former headquarters of McDonald's

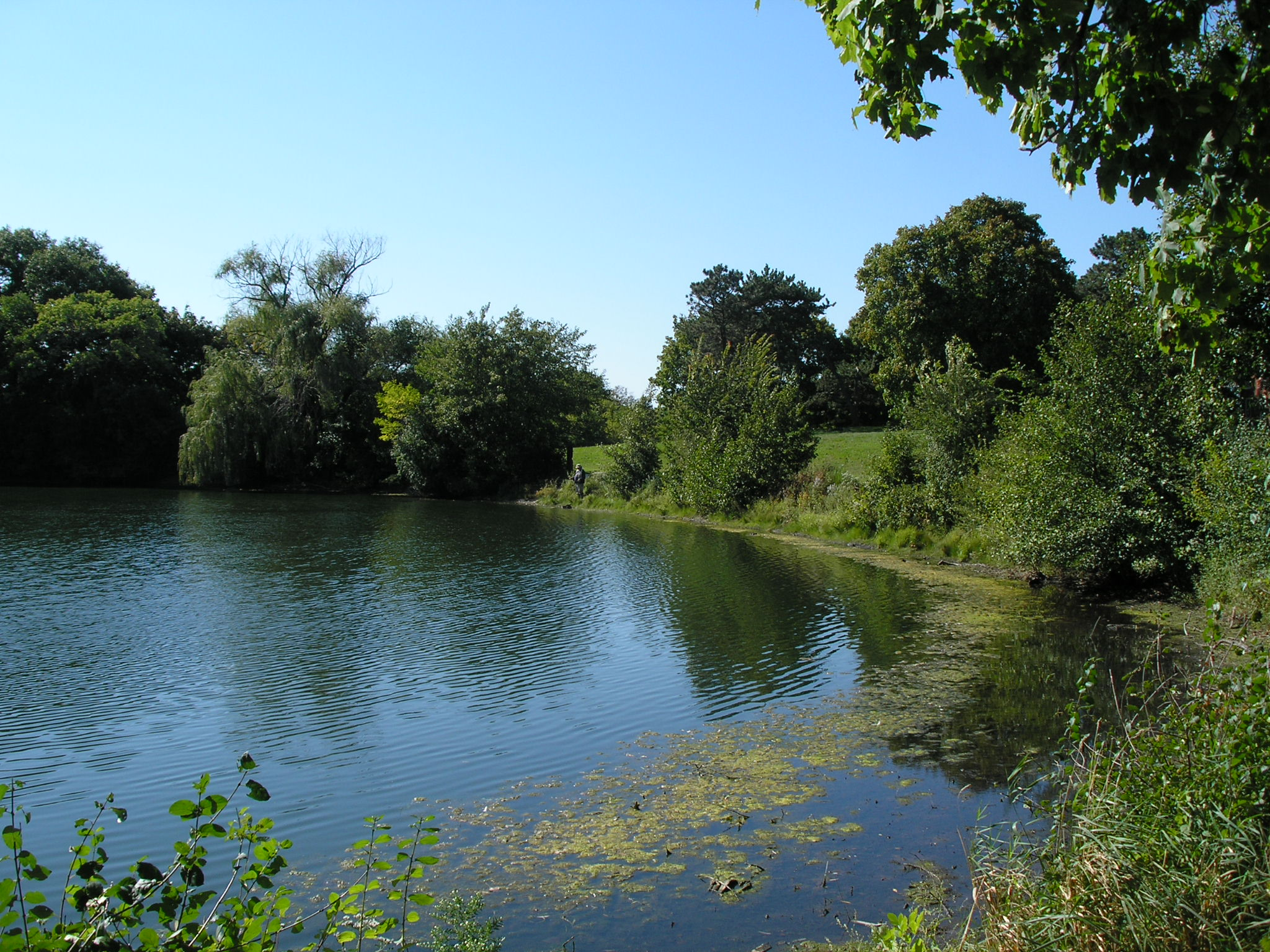
Mayslake Peabody Estate Forest Preserve

While many Oak Brook residents commute to jobs scattered throughout the Chicago metropolitan area, Oak Brook is also the home of many corporate offices. The world headquarters of McDonald's Corporation was in Oak Brook from 1971, when McDonald's moved into the Oak Brook facility from an office within the Chicago Loop, until 2018, when it moved back to Chicago. Other corporations include Ace Hardware, Blistex, Crowe Horwath, TreeHouse Foods, Federal Signal, Sanford, CenterPoint Properties, Dantech Information Technology, Hub Group and Follett Higher Education Group. Global non-profit organizations such as Lions Clubs International, and Zonta International are also based in Oak Brook.

The Institute in Basic Life Principles, a controversial Christian sect founded by Bill Gothard, was formerly based in Oak Brook; however, it would sell its facilities and relocate to Texas.

=== Top employers ===
According to the Village's 2022 Annual Comprehensive Financial Report, the top employers in the city are:

#	Employer	# of Employees
1	Oakbrook Center	7,000
2	Advocate Health Care	1,853
3	Ace Hardware	1,056
4	Hub Group	754
5	Chamberlain Group	680
6	Blistex	462
7	Inland Real Estate Group of Companies	448
8	Millennium Trust	431
9	Lions Clubs International	315
10	TreeHouse Foods	278

== Government ==
Oak Brook vote by party in presidential elections
Year	Democratic	Republican	Third Parties
2024	43.19% 2,153	55.49% 2,766	1.32% 66
2020	46.09% 2,743	52.49% 3,124	1.43% 85
2016	41.35% 2,145	53.96% 2,799	4.68% 243
2012	29.76% 1,403	69.35% 3,270	0.89% 42

== Education ==
=== Public schools ===
School districts in sections in DuPage County include:

- Butler School District 53 (elementary school district)
- Hinsdale Community Consolidated School District 181 (elementary school district)
- Salt Creek School District 48 (elementary school district)
- Hinsdale Township High School District 86, for people zoned to the Butler and Hinsdale elementary school districts
  - Hinsdale Central High School is the zoned high school of parts of Oak Brook in this district.
- DuPage High School District 88, for people zoned to the Salt Creek district
- Elmhurst School District 205 (PK-12)

Brook Forest Elementary, and Butler Junior High, are located in Oak Brook; they are administered by Butler School District 53.

=== Private schools ===
- Sunshine Montessori of Oakbrook

== Infrastructure ==
=== Transportation ===
Oak Brook is served by a network of major federal, state, and county roads, including the Tri-State Tollway (Interstate 294), and the Ronald Reagan Memorial Tollway (Interstate 88). The commercial corridor is served by Pace bus routes.

== Notable people ==
- Frank Calabrese, Sr., made man and caporegime of the Chicago Outfit
- Chris Chelios, Stanley Cup-winning defenseman with the Detroit Red Wings
- William J. Cullerton, World War II flying ace and former radio host
- Bill Gothard, founder of Institute In Basic Life Principles, a controversial Christian sect
- Stan Mikita, Stanley Cup-winning center with the Chicago Blackhawks
- Dick Portillo, founder of the Portillo Restaurant Group
- Ed Rensi, a former CEO of McDonald's
- Frank Thomas, first baseman with several Major League Baseball teams
- Ty Warner, founder of toy company Ty
- Doug Wilson, defenseman with the San Jose Sharks
