= Butler School District 53 =

School district in Illinois, United States

Location
- Oak Brook, Illinois; United States

District information
- Grades: PreK–8
- NCES District ID: 1707980

Students and staff
- Students: 473

Other information
- Website: www.butler53.com

Butler School District 53 is a school district headquartered in Oak Brook, Illinois.

== History ==
Paul O'Malley, who previously played minor league baseball, and was superintendent of Norridge School District 80, became superintendent of Butler 53 on July 1, 2019.

In 2021 the district began purchasing 170 air purifier units as well as using LED lighting in place of fluorescent lighting. The total cost was US$348,076 (equivalent to $413,562 in 2025).
