= Jen Gunter =

Canadian-American gynecologist, columnist, and author

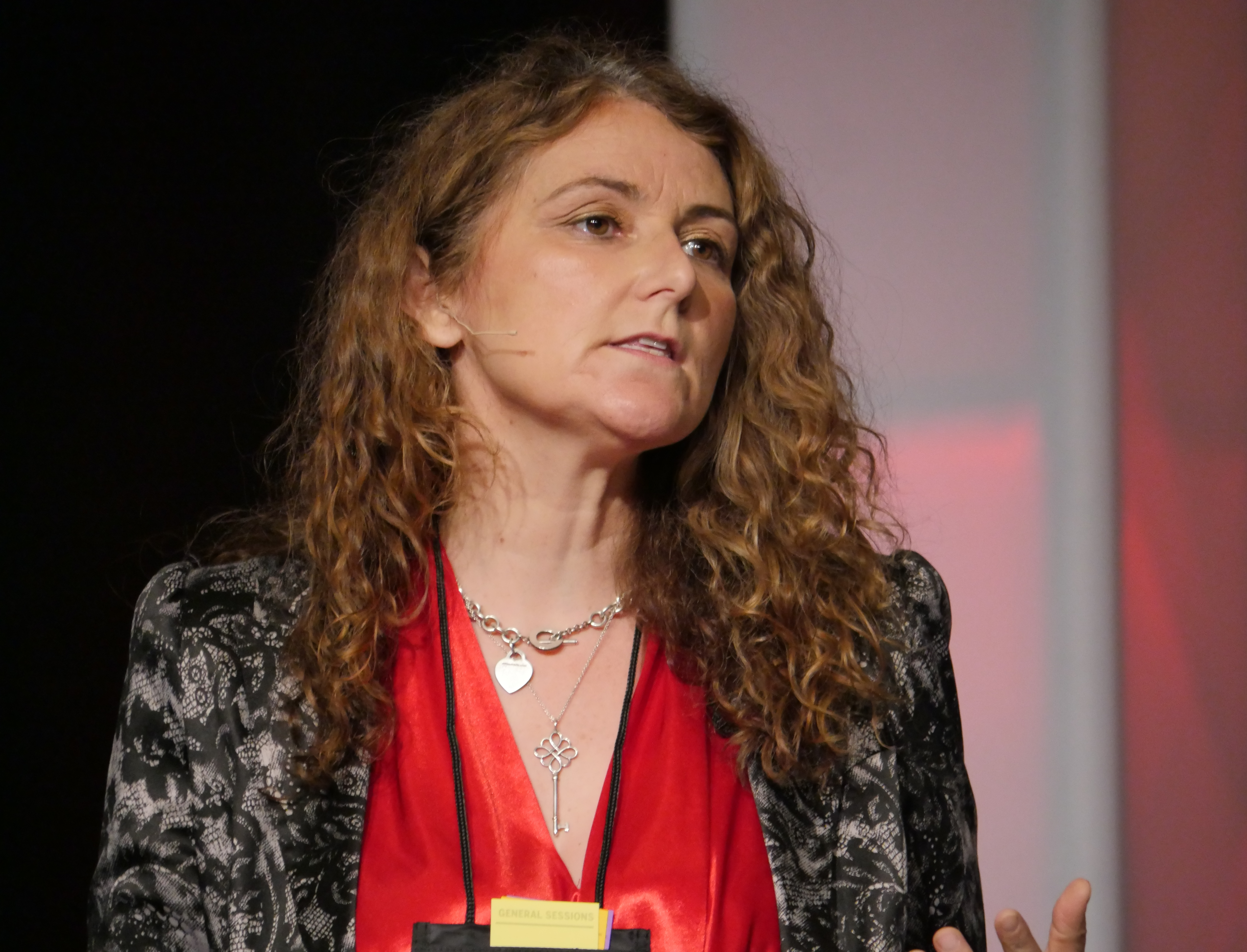
- Jennifer Gunter at CSICon 2018
- Born: Jennifer Gunter; Winnipeg, Manitoba, Canada
- Other name: Dr. Jen
- Education: University of Manitoba (MD), University of Western Ontario, University of Winnipeg
- Occupations: Gynecologist, author, columnist
- Years active: 1996–present
- Website: drjengunter.com

Jennifer Gunter is a Canadian-American gynecologist, a New York Times columnist covering women's health, an author, and a specialist in chronic pain medicine and vulvovaginal disorders.

== Early life and education ==
Gunter was born in Winnipeg, Manitoba, Canada.

A positive experience at the hospital when she was eleven and had a skateboard accident motivated her to decide on a career in health care. Declining sedation, she watched the hospital staff perform an angiogram on her ruptured spleen as they explained the procedure to her.

From 1984 to 1986, Gunter studied at the University of Winnipeg until being accepted into medical school in 1986. In 1990, Gunter graduated from the University of Manitoba College of Medicine. From 1990 to 1995, she completed obstetrics and gynecology training at the University of Western Ontario in London, Ontario. In 1995, Gunter moved to the United States for a fellowship in infectious diseases and women's health at the University of Kansas Medical Center, where she also developed an interest in pain management.

== Career ==
=== Doctor ===
From 1996 to 2001, Gunter worked at the University of Kansas Medical Center for an additional five years after the one-year fellowship ended.

In 2001, Gunter worked as a lecturer at the University of Colorado Hospital in Denver, Colorado. During this time, the loss of one of Gunter's sons in a triplet pregnancy she described as traumatic made her decide to shift her work away from the field of obstetrics. Instead she focused on gynecology, specializing in vaginal and vulval conditions.

Gunter has practiced medicine since 1996. Gunter works as an OB/GYN and a pain medicine physician. Her approach is based on evidence-based medicine integrated with a focus on empathy and the patient experience, which Gunter said she learned from the University of Western Ontario and the adjacency to McMaster University Medical School, which is a center of evidence-based medicine.

Since 2006, she has been at The Permanente Medical Group of Kaiser Permanente in Northern California. At Kaiser, Gunter manages a health clinic for women in the Chronic Pelvic Pain & Vulvo-Vaginal Disorders division.

=== Author ===
In 2004, Gunter delivered triplets prematurely. One was born at 22 weeks and did not survive. The other two were born at 26 weeks. The lack of publicly available, medically sound information about the particular needs of premature babies motivated her to write a book, The Preemie Primer: A Complete Guide for Parents of Premature Babies — from Birth through the Toddler Years and Beyond.

Since 2011, Gunter has written a blog that has reached 15 million views and has generated controversies in the mainstream media. Gunter has been critical of health claims made by celebrities and the careless way that media outlets report on matters such as reproductive health and vaccination. She advocates for more responsible health coverage by the news media, less attention to health advice by celebrities, and for doctors to communicate better with their patients.

In June 2019, The Lancet published an opinion piece by Gunter calling for "a better medical internet" by having more medical experts involved in disseminating adequate medical information to the public. "It is simply not acceptable to me that quality research that can save lives and reduce suffering could be undone by a medical conspiracy theorist or a celebrity looking to sell supplements."

In 2019 to 2020, Gunter wrote two columns on women's health at The New York Times: a monthly column called "The Cycle" and a weekly column called "You Asked". In 2021, Gunter started a newsletter, The Vajenda, focused on providing medical information to women — and combatting medical misinformation.

Gunter is known by the nickname "Twitter's Resident Gynecologist" and has used X (formerly Twitter) to share information about pain management and debunk myths about women's health. As of 2024, her X account reaches over 360,000 followers.

Her book The Menopause Manifesto debuted at number 4 on The New York Times best seller list for "Advice, How-To & Miscellaneous" on June 6, 2021.

=== The Vagina Bible ===
In 2019 Gunter's second book, The Vagina Bible, was published. The book presents medical information about female reproductive anatomy and corrects common myths. Gunter stated that she wrote the book to counter what she considers a large amount of dangerous false information on the web about female health. The book includes a section focusing on trans men and women. The title reached No. 1 on the list of Canadian nonfiction bestsellers, according to the Retail Council of Canada.

During promotion of the book, there was controversy when the publisher's Twitter advertisements were blocked for use of inappropriate language (presumably the word vagina). The ads were only allowed to run after a large online conversation developed.

== Popular culture ==
As a doctor, Gunter has spoken out on a variety of topics affecting women's health, including abortion, the HPV vaccine, and the use of fetal tissue in research. Gunter aims to correct misconceptions about women's health through her books, newspaper column and online discussions. In 2021 to 2023, Gunter hosted a TED Audio Collective podcast called Body Stuff with Dr. Jen Gunter, which aimed to combat common health myths.

In 2015, Gunter's blog post critical of a Toronto Star article that mischaracterized the safety of Gardasil, a HPV vaccine, resulted in an apology by Toronto Star. There was additional discussion and scrutiny over the coverage of vaccine safety in the mainstream press.

=== Goop ===
Gunter is a long-time critic of products sold by Goop, the company owned by actress Gwyneth Paltrow.

Her criticism of one of Goop's products, a jade egg meant to be inserted in one's vagina, came to the attention of a wider audience when her blog post of January 17, 2017, was picked up by a tabloid newspaper. Additional posts elicited a written response from Goop. Goop eventually paid consumer protection fines and refunded the cost of vaginal eggs to customers who purchased them.

This exchange provoked an intervention by Timothy Caulfield, a Canada research chair in health law and policy at the University of Alberta, who supported Gunter's position. Caulfield stated that, "studies have consistently found, for example, that celebrities can have a measurable and less-than-ideal impact on everything from cancer screening to smoking to the food that we eat."

In October 2018, Gunter and archaeologist Sarah Parcak published a study to investigate whether or not jade eggs were used vaginally in ancient China, as Goop's marketing claims they were. A review of the description of 5,000 artifacts available in major databases of Chinese archeology found no mention of such an object.

=== Jensplaining ===
In June 2019, the Canadian Broadcasting Corporation announced the 10-part docuseries called Jensplaining, which aired on its free streaming network, CBC Gem, in August 2019. The series comprised ten episodes, with topics including menstruation, wellness, vaccines, menopause, weight loss, birth and sex.

=== Vagisil ===
In February 2021, Vagisil released a new line of products called OMV!, aimed at teenagers, which include scented wipes, cleansers and anti itch creams for vaginas and vulvas. Gunter expressed concern with OMV! advertising suggesting that something needed to be fixed with teens' vaginas. She explained that vulvas and vaginas take care of themselves and that wipes can be irritating and cause inflammation. Vagisil has responded to criticism of their new line by stating that their products are safe for external use and have been tested by independent dermatologists and gynecologists.

== Shoes ==
Gunter and Fluevog partnered together for The Dr. Gunter shoes, lace-up heels "inspired by her positivity and confidence."

== Personal life ==
Gunter married her husband in 2024. She had been married twice before. Gunter is divorced from her second husband and father of her sons. Gunter and her twin sons have lived in Northern California since 2005. The third son of what would have been triplets died moments after birth at 22 weeks gestation.

Gunter has spoken about her struggles with a lifelong binge eating disorder and said she has considered writing a book about weight loss.

In 2025, Gunter announced that she would be moving back to Canada after three decades in the US. The decision was influenced by the political climate in the US, including losses of women's access to healthcare such as abortions.

== Certifications ==
- American Board of Pain Medicine, Pain Medicine, Diplomate (DABPM)
- American Board of Physical Medicine and Rehab, Pain Medicine (ABPMR (pain))
- American Congress of Obstetricians and Gynecologists, Obstetrics and Gynecology, Fellow (FACOG)
- Royal College of Physicians and Surgeons of Canada, Fellow (FRCS(C))

== Selected works and publications ==
=== Books ===
- Gunter, M.D., Jennifer (2010). The Preemie Primer: A Complete Guide for Parents of Premature Babies—from Birth through the Toddler Years and Beyond. Cambridge, MA: Da Capo Press. ISBN 9780738214146. OCLC 688506407.
- Gunter, Dr. Jen (2019). The Vagina Bible: The Vulva and the Vagina—Separating the Myth from the Medicine. Toronto: Random House Canada. ISBN 9780735277373. OCLC 1109801780.
- Gunter, Dr. Jen (2021). The Menopause Manifesto : Own Your Health with Facts and Feminism. New York, NY: Citadel Press/Kensington Publishing Corp. ISBN 9780806540665. OCLC 1249024122.
- Gunter, Dr. Jen (2024). Blood: The Science, Medicine, and Mythology of Menstruation. Citadel Press/Kensington Publishing Corp.

=== Selected articles ===
- Gunter, Jennifer (December 14, 2010). "We're getting maternity care all wrong". USA Today.
- Gunter, Dr Jen (September 12, 2016). "Yes, Hillary almost fainted: I'm a doctor and it's really OK". TheHill.
- Gunter, M.D, Jen (October 13, 2016). "I'm An Ob/Gyn And A Trump Presidency Scares Me—Here's Why". SELF.
- Gunter, Dr Jen (October 16, 2017). "Trump Health Officials Just Quietly Defined Life As 'Beginning at Conception'". The Cut.
- Gunter, Jen (November 16, 2017). "My Vagina Is Terrific. Your Opinion About It Is Not". The New York Times.
- Gunter, Jen (December 21, 2018). "Your Vagina Is Terrific (and Everyone Else's Opinions Still Are Not)". The New York Times.
- Gunter, Jen (February 26, 2019). "Opinion: I Didn't Kill My Baby". The New York Times.
- Gunter, Jen (May 20, 2019). "Opinion: Medical School Doesn't Teach the 'Woman's Life Is in Danger' Curriculum". The New York Times.
- Gunter, Jen (May 23, 2019). "How to Care for Your Hair ... Down There". The New York Times.
- Gunter, Jen (August 8, 2019). "Stopping the Anxiety of HPV". The New York Times.
- Gunter, Jen (September 19, 2019). "Treating the Incredible Shrinking Vagina". The New York Times.
- Gunter, Jen (October 4, 2019). "PCOS Is More Than a Fertility Issue". The New York Times.

=== Selected journals ===
- Gunter, MD, Jennifer; Clark, MS, Margaret; Weigel, MD, John (April 2000). "Gynecology: Is there an association between vulvodynia and interstitial cystitis?". Obstetrics & Gynecology. 95 (4, S1). The American College of Obstetricians and Gynecologists: S4. doi:10.1016/S0029-7844(00)00577-9. ISSN 0029-7844. OCLC 4924930131.
- Gunter, MD, Jennifer; Smith-King, MD, Maureen; Collins (BGS), Julie; Tawfik, MD, Ossama (July–August 1998). "Vulvodynia: in situ hybridization analysis for human papillomavirus". Primary Care Update for OB/GYNS. 5 (4). Elsevier Science Inc: 152. doi:10.1016/S1068-607X(98)00037-7. PMID 10838282.
- Gunter, Jennifer (September 2003). "Chronic Pelvic Pain: An Integrated Approach to Diagnosis and Treatment". Obstetrical & Gynecological Survey. 58 (9): 615–623. doi:10.1097/01.OGX.0000083225.90017.01. ISSN 0029-7828. OCLC 4654452193. PMID 12972837. S2CID 25101266.
- Gunter, Jennifer (September 2003). "Genital and perianal warts: new treatment opportunities for human papillomavirus infection". American Journal of Obstetrics and Gynecology. 189 (3): S3–S11. doi:10.1067/S0002-9378(03)00789-0. ISSN 0002-9378. OCLC 4651422716. PMID 14532897.
- Gunter, MD, Jennifer (September 2007). "Intimate Partner Violence". Obstetrics and Gynecology Clinics of North America. 34 (3). Elsevier: 367–388. doi:10.1016/j.ogc.2007.06.010. ISSN 0889-8545. OCLC 4933240337. PMID 17921005.
- Gunter, Jennifer (December 2007). "Vulvodynia: New Thoughts on a Devastating Condition". Obstetrical & Gynecological Survey. 62 (12): 812–819. doi:10.1097/01.ogx.0000290350.14036.d6. ISSN 0029-7828. OCLC 4654485023. PMID 18005458. S2CID 22969186.
- Gunter, Jennifer (August 2008). "Ten Suggestions for Discharge Medications: Make Going Home Safer and Easier". Exceptional Parent. 38 (8). EP Global Communications Inc: 22. ISSN 0046-9157. OCLC 424703629. ERIC EJ803043
- Gunter, Jen (March 21, 2011). "Chapter 1: Neurobiology of Chronic Pelvic Pain". In Vercellini, Paolo (ed.). Chronic Pelvic Pain. Oxford, UK: Blackwell Publishing Ltd. pp. 1–6. doi:10.1002/9781444391855.ch1. ISBN 9781444330663. OCLC 5151389380.
- Gunter, Jennifer; Parcak, Sarah (October 25, 2018). "Vaginal Jade Eggs: Ancient Chinese Practice or Modern Marketing Myth?". Female Pelvic Medicine & Reconstructive Surgery. 25 (1): 1–2. doi:10.1097/SPV.0000000000000643. PMID 30365448. S2CID 53113146.
- Gunter, Jen (June 2019). "Medical misinformation and the internet: a call to arms". The Lancet. 393 (10188): 2294–2295. doi:10.1016/S0140-6736(19)31206-1. ISSN 0140-6736. OCLC 8164688620. PMID 31180024. S2CID 179122378.
