= Poor and Stupid =

- South Park episode
- Episode no.: Season 14; Episode 8
- Directed by: Trey Parker
- Written by: Trey Parker
- Production code: 1408
- Original air date: October 6, 2010

Episode chronology
← Previous "Crippled Summer"	Next → "It's a Jersey Thing"
- South Park season 14

"Poor and Stupid" is the eighth episode and mid-season premiere of the fourteenth season of the American animated television series South Park, and the 203rd overall episode of the series. It aired on Comedy Central in the United States on October 6, 2010. In the episode, Cartman wants to become a NASCAR racer, but he feels that he cannot because he is not "poor and stupid enough" to fulfill his dream. After some experiments, his dream comes true, and he receives his own race car after his consumption of Vagisil brings massive attention to the product, much to the dismay of his friend Kenny, who tries to stop Cartman from giving his favorite event a bad reputation.

"Poor and Stupid" received a mixed reception. 3.139 million viewers watched the episode, according to Nielsen Media Research, making it the second most watched cable television show of its airdate, losing the number one spot to the baseball game between the New York Yankees and the Minnesota Twins during the 2010 American League Division Series.

== Plot ==
The episode opens as Stan and Kyle find Cartman crying in front of his locker, lamenting that he is disheartened by an essay assignment by Mr. Garrison: "What I Want to Be When I Grow Up". Cartman elaborates that it is his dream to become a NASCAR driver, though believes this dream is unachievable, explaining that he is neither "poor" nor "stupid" enough, and utilizes Kenny (who innocently confirms that he is a NASCAR fan) as an example of the poverty he must achieve to become a NASCAR driver.

Dismayed at Cartman's views of NASCAR, Kenny, Stan, and Kyle effectively convince Cartman that he's actually very poor and very stupid, though Cartman wishes to become far poorer and more stupid to bolster his chances of achieving his goal. Cartman immediately turns to Butters for help in becoming as poor and stupid as possible: giving Butters all his money and ordering him to spend it all and never give it back. Later, while watching Two and a Half Men, Cartman sees a commercial for Vagisil that lists short-term memory loss as a possible side effect, thus he shoplifts some and consumes it.

On race day, Butters convinces a driver to abandon his car because his wife has been raped, as Cartman hops into his car, though his total lack of knowledge causes an accident that lands him in the hospital. The doctor reprimands Cartman for the foolishness of his stunt, which he explains is the stupidest he's ever seen: restoring Cartman's hope. Cartman's antics cause the news media to wonder if all NASCAR fans are as stupid as he seems to be, infuriating Kenny who begins to take serious matters into his own hands.

Kenny, furious at Eric's behavior, storms to Cartman's house just in time for a visit from Vagisil founder Geoff Hamill and his wife Patty. Since Cartman's determination has brought considerable attention to Vagisil, Hamill rewards him with his own Vagisil-sponsored racecar: further galling Kenny. Before his first race, Cartman posts bigoted and ignorant statements on his podcast and the media concludes that "NASCAR really is just for the poor and stupid". Kenny decides that he must put a stop to Cartman. Kenny tries to smuggle a hunting rifle into the racetrack though it is confiscated by security, who reassure him that he can buy another in the gift shop.

At Cartman's first race in his Vagisil car, he drives badly: crashing into other drivers, pulling Danica Patrick under the wheel, and mowing down spectators. When Kenny tries to interrupt, he's knocked onto the track; 2 cars crash to avoid him, leaving Cartman's the only car remaining in the race. Suddenly, Patty Hamill, fed up of her husband's disrespectful and condescending remarks toward her, gets onto the track and takes Jimmie Johnson's damaged car. She beats Cartman and wins the race, much to Hamill's sheer disappointment, now that his company is ruined. Cartman apologizes to Kenny (who, surprisingly is still alive) for trying to become a NASCAR driver, and gives his future up, still believing that he is too smart for NASCAR. He demands that Butters give back his money, then yells at him for having done what he was told and gotten rid of it. Kenny watches in disbelief and confusion.

== Production and theme ==
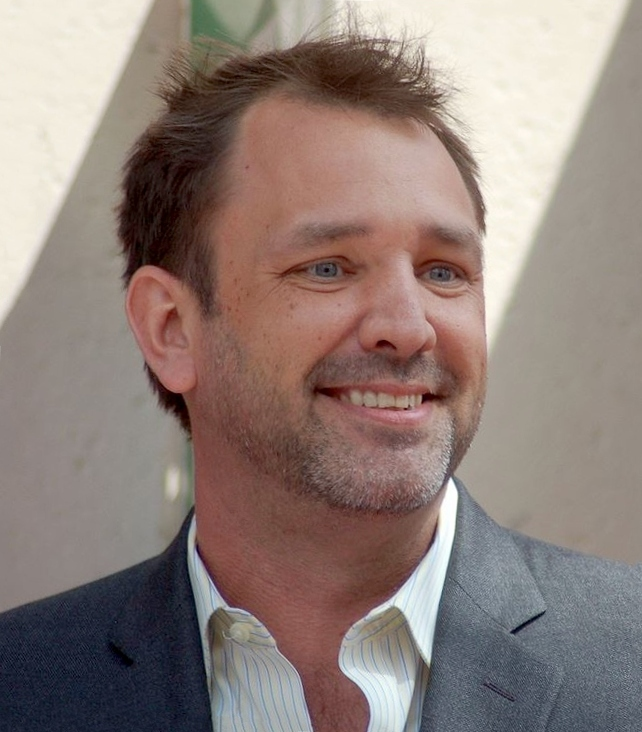
Series co-creator Trey Parker wrote and directed "Poor and Stupid"

"Poor and Stupid" was written and directed by series co-founder Trey Parker, and was rated TV-MA LV in the United States. It first aired on October 6, 2010 in the United States on Comedy Central.

The episode satirizes stereotypes associated with the NASCAR community. In the episode, Cartman claims that all NASCAR drivers and fans are poor and stupid, and that he too must become so in order to become a NASCAR driver. The NASCAR drivers are portrayed as well-spoken and the NASCAR fans are depicted as being fairly smart; it is only Cartman's stereotypical impersonation of the NASCAR community that casts them in a negative light.

== Reception ==
=== Ratings ===
In its original American broadcast on October 6, 2010, "Poor and Stupid" was watched by 3.139 million viewers, according to Nielsen Media Research, making it the second most watched cable television show of the night, losing the number one spot to the baseball game between the New York Yankees and the Minnesota Twins during the 2010 American League Division Series. The episode received a 2.0 rating/4 share, meaning it was seen by 2 percent of the population and 4 percent of the people watching television at the time of its broadcast. Among adult viewers between ages 18 and 49, the episode scored a 1.8 rating/5 share and among male viewers between ages 18 and 34, the episode received a 3.8 rating/12 share.

=== Critical response ===
"Poor and Stupid" received mixed reviews. The A.V. Club gave the episode a B− rating. IGN gave the episode a score of 7 out of 10. Reviewer Ramsey Isler described the episode as "docile" by South Park standards and asserted that the episode lacks the show's "signature style of biting ridicule". Despite some winning one-liners and sight gags he considered the episode among the weaker episodes of the season so far and hoped for more in future episodes. Brad Trechak of TV Squad said that, while the episode had some humorous moments, the episode "doesn't feel like Matt [Stone] and Trey [Parker] at their best", and criticized the satire as "not [being] the sort of sharp social satire we would expect from South Park." Writing for The Yorker, Simon Cocks wrote that the episode turned out to be "reliable yet ultimately disappointing". Merrill Barr of Film School Rejects was more positive, calling "Poor and Stupid" a "fine episode of South Park".

None of the NASCAR drivers lampooned in "Poor and Stupid" were reported to be offended by their depiction in the episode. Driver Jeff Gordon said that he thought, although the episode was making fun of NASCAR, it was still good publicity for the sport.

In January 2018, Danica Patrick appeared on the Joe Rogan Experience and said she felt "honored" to be parodied in the episode, and that it was one of the first instances when she felt she "made it."

== Home media ==
"Poor and Stupid", along with the thirteen other episodes from South Park's fourteenth season, were released on a three-disc DVD set and two-disc Blu-ray set in the United States on April 26, 2011.
