= Stridex =

Topical medication for acne

Stridex (originally spelled Stri-Dex) is an American over the counter medication used for acne treatment and prevention. It comes in the form of non-individually wrapped cotton pads saturated with salicylic acid or benzoyl peroxide and a combination of other non-prescription topical acne medications. Most products in the Stridex line contain as the active ingredient salicylic acid (0.5–2.5%); Stridex Power Pads contain benzoyl peroxide (2.5%), a nonprescription acne treatment medication. Common side effects include, but are not limited to, dryness of the skin, possible burning, and tingling. In 2013, the FDA started to investigate a possible link between benzoyl peroxide- and/or salicylic acid-based acne prevention medicine with hypersensitivity and anaphylactic reactions, although they neither recalled any products nor required any specific product-specific warnings.

Stridex was first released in 1959 by Lehn & Fink and was the first acne treatment pad which did not require a prescription for purchase. It is part of the Smithsonian's permanent collection. In 1996, it was purchased by Blistex, Inc.
