= Lead(II) acetate =

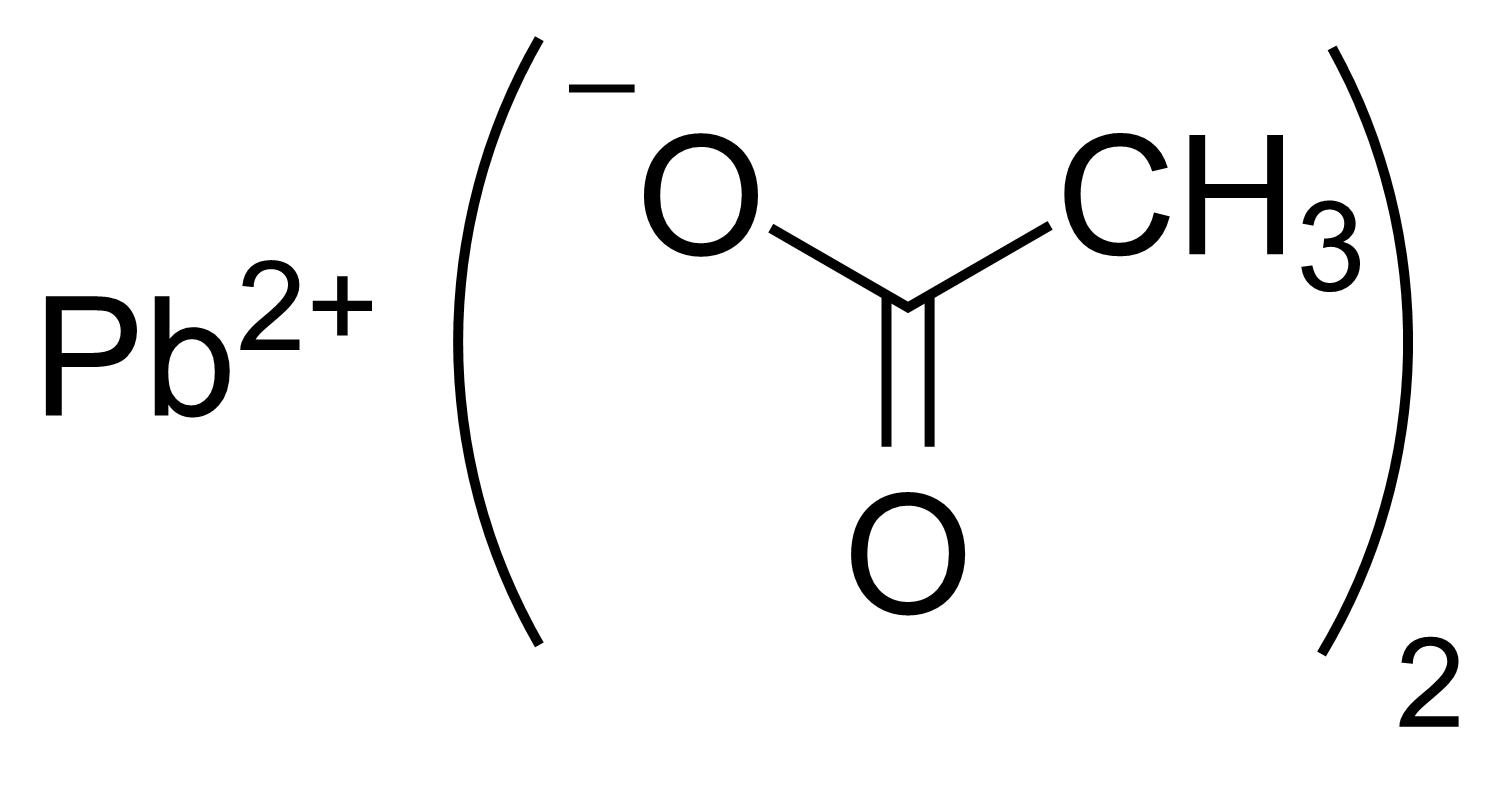
- Skeletal formula of lead(II) acetate

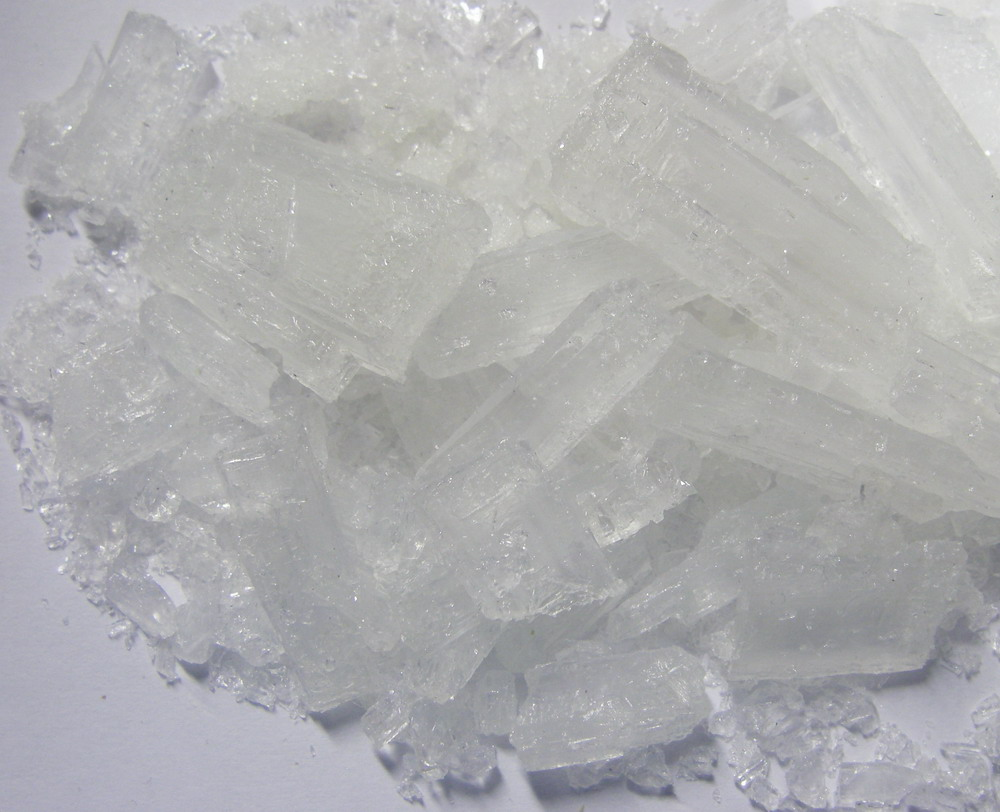
- Toxic lead sugar or lead(II) acetate

Names
- IUPAC name Lead(II) acetate
- Systematic IUPAC name Lead(II) ethanoate
- Other names Plumbous acetate, Sugar of Lead, lead diacetate, lead sugar, Salt of Saturn, Goulard's powder

Identifiers
CAS Number	301-04-2; 6080-56-4 (trihydrate); 1335-32-6 (basic)
3D model (JSmol)	Interactive image
ChEBI	CHEBI:31767
ChEMBL	ChEMBL1909062
ChemSpider	8956
ECHA InfoCard	100.005.551
EC Number	206-104-4
MeSH	lead+acetate
PubChem CID	16685321
RTECS number	OF8050000
UNII	KL498O6790; RX077P88RY (trihydrate); BW7DT27250 (basic)
CompTox Dashboard (EPA)	DTXSID6020773
- InChI: InChI=1S/2C2H4O2.Pb/c2*1-2(3)4;/h2*1H3,(H,3,4);/q;;+2/p-2 Key: GUWSLQUAAYEZAF-UHFFFAOYSA-L
- SMILES: CC(=O)[O-].CC(=O)[O-].[Pb+2]

Properties
Chemical formula	Pb(C_{2}H_{3}O_{2})_{2}
Molar mass	325.29 g/mol (anhydrous); 379.33g/mol (trihydrate)
Appearance	White powder or colourless, efflorescent crystals
Odor	Slightly acetic
Density	3.25 g/cm^{3} (20 °C, anhydrous); 2.55 g/cm^{3} (trihydrate); 1.69 g/cm^{3} (decahydrate)
Melting point	280 °C (536 °F; 553 K) (anhydrous); 75 °C (167 °F; 348 K) (trihydrate) decomposes at ≥ 200 °C; 22 °C (72 °F; 295 K) (decahydrate)
Boiling point	Decomposes
Solubility in water	Anhydrous: 19.8 g/100 mL (0 °C); 44.31 g/100 mL (20 °C); 69.5 g/100 mL (30 °C); 218.3 g/100 mL (50 °C)
Solubility	Anhydrous and trihydrate are soluble in alcohol, glycerol
Solubility in methanol	Anhydrous: 102.75 g/100 g (66.1 °C); Trihydrate: 74.75 g/100 g (15 °C); 214.95 g/100 g (66.1 °C)
Solubility in glycerol	Anhydrous: 20 g/100 g (15 °C); Trihydrate: 143 g/100 g (20 °C)
Magnetic susceptibility (χ)	−89.1·10^{−6} cm^{3}/mol
Refractive index (n_{D})	1.567 (trihydrate)

Structure
Crystal structure	Monoclinic (anhydrous, trihydrate); Rhombic (decahydrate)

Thermochemistry
Std enthalpy of formation (Δ_{f}H^{⦵}_{298})	−960.9 kJ/mol (anhydrous) −1848.6 kJ/mol (trihydrate)

Hazards
- Occupational safety and health (OHS/OSH)
Main hazards	Neurotoxic, probable human carcinogen
- GHS labelling
Pictograms	(GHS08: Health hazard) (GHS09: Environmental hazard)
Signal word	Danger
Hazard statements	H360, H373, H410
Precautionary statements	P201, P273, P308+P313, P501
NFPA 704 (fire diamond)	2 1 1
Flash point	Non-flammable
- Lethal dose or concentration (LD, LC)
LD_{50} (median dose)	400 mg/kg (mice, oral)
LC_{Lo} (lowest published)	300 mg/kg (dog, oral)

Related compounds
Other cations	Lead(IV) acetate
- Except where otherwise noted, data are given for materials in their standard state (at 25 °C [77 °F], 100 kPa). verify (what is ?) Infobox references

Lead(II) acetate, also known as lead(II) ethanoate and formerly known as sugar of lead (or of Saturn), is a white crystalline chemical compound with a slightly sweet taste. Its chemical formula is usually expressed as Pb(CH_{3}COO)_{2} or Pb(OAc)_{2}, where Ac represents the acetyl group. Like many other lead compounds, it causes lead poisoning. Lead acetate is soluble in water and glycerin, and slightly soluble in ethanol. With water it forms the trihydrate, Pb(OAc)_{2}·3H_{2}O, a colourless or white efflorescent monoclinic crystalline substance.

The substance is used as a reagent to make other lead compounds and as a fixative for some dyes. In low concentrations, it formerly served as the principal active ingredient in progressive types of hair colouring dyes. Lead(II) acetate is also used as a mordant in textile printing and dyeing, and as a drier in paints and varnishes. It was historically used as a sweetener and preservative in wines and in other foods and for cosmetics.

== Production ==
Lead(II) acetate can be made by boiling elemental lead in acetic acid and hydrogen peroxide. This method will also work with lead(II) carbonate or lead(II) oxide.

Pb + H_{2}O_{2} + 2 H^{+} → Pb^{2+} + 2 H_{2}O
Pb^{2+} + 2 AcO^{−} → Pb(OAc)_{2}

Lead(II) acetate can also be made by dissolving lead(II) oxide in acetic acid:

PbO + 2 AcOH → Pb(OAc)_{2} + H_{2}O

Lead(II) acetate can also be made via a single-displacement reaction between copper acetate and lead metal:

Cu(OAc)_{2} + Pb → Cu + Pb(OAc)_{2}

== Structure ==
The crystal structure of anhydrous lead(II) acetate has been described as a 2D coordination polymer. In comparison, lead(II) acetate trihydrate's structure is a 1D coordination polymer. In the trihydrate, the Pb^{2+} ion's coordination sphere consists of nine oxygen atoms belonging to three water molecules, two bidentate acetate groups and two bridging acetate groups. The coordination geometry at Pb is a monocapped square antiprism. The trihydrate thermally decomposes to a hemihydrate, Pb(OAc)_{2}·1/2H_{2}O, and to basic acetates such as Pb_{4}O(OAc)_{6} and Pb_{2}O(OAc)_{2}.

Comparison of anhydrous and trihydrate crystal structures
	Anhydrous Pb(OAc)_{2}	Trihydrate Pb(OAc)_{2}·3H_{2}O
Lead coordination sphere		
Strongly bonded aggregation	2D sheet	1D chain
Weakly bonded aggregation	sheets stacked with hydrophobic surfaces in contact	chains linked by hydrogen bonds

== Uses ==
Lead acetate is used as a precursor to other lead compounds such as the various carbonates.

=== Niche and laboratory uses ===
Lead(II) acetate paper is used to detect the poisonous gas hydrogen sulfide. The gas reacts with lead(II) acetate on the moistened test paper to form a grey precipitate of lead(II) sulfide.

An aqueous solution of lead(II) acetate is a byproduct of the process used in the cleaning and maintenance of stainless steel firearm suppressors (silencers) and compensators when using a 1:1 ratio of hydrogen peroxide and white vinegar (acetic acid). The solution is agitated by the bubbling action of the hydrogen peroxide, with the main reaction being the oxidation of lead by hydrogen peroxide and subsequent dissolution of lead oxide by the acetic acid, which forms lead acetate. Because of its high toxicity, this chemical solution must be appropriately disposed by a chemical processing facility or hazardous materials centre. Alternatively, the solution may be reacted with sulfuric acid to precipitate nearly insoluble lead(II) sulfate. The solid may then be removed by mechanical filtration and is safer to dispose of than aqueous lead acetate.

Lead acetate is also used sometimes to stain samples in preparation for electron microscopy.

== Historical uses ==
=== Sweetener ===
Like other lead(II) salts, lead(II) acetate has a sweet taste, which led to its historical use as a sugar substitute in both wines and foods. The ancient Romans, who had few sweeteners besides honey, would boil must (unfiltered grape juice) in lead pots to produce a reduced sugar syrup called defrutum, concentrated again into sapa. This syrup was used to sweeten wine and to sweeten and preserve fruit. It is possible that lead(II) acetate or other lead compounds leaching into the syrup might have caused lead poisoning in those who consumed it. Lead acetate is no longer used in the production of sweeteners because of its recognized toxicity. Legislation prohibiting its use as a wine sweetener circa 1750 proved ineffective until decades later, when chemical methods of detecting its presence had been developed.

The earliest documented fatal poisoning of an individual by lead acetate was that of Pope Clement II, who died in October 1047. A toxicological examination of his remains conducted in the mid-20th century confirmed centuries-old rumors that he had been poisoned with sugar of lead. It is not clear whether he was assassinated.

In 1787 painter and biographer Albert Christoph Dies swallowed, by accident, approximately 3/4 ounce (20 g) of lead acetate. His recovery from this poison was slow and incomplete. He lived with illnesses until his death in 1822.

Although the use of lead(II) acetate as a sweetener was already illegal at that time, composer Ludwig van Beethoven may have died of lead poisoning caused by wines adulterated with lead acetate (see also Beethoven's liver).

In 1887, 38 hunting horses belonging to Captain William Hollwey Steeds were poisoned in their stables at Clonsilla House, Dublin, Ireland. At least ten of the horses died. Captain Steeds, an "extensive commission agent", had previously supplied the horses for the Bray and Greystones Coach. It transpired that they had been fed a bran mash that had been sweetened with a toxic lead acetate.

=== Cosmetics ===
Lead(II) acetate and white lead have been used in cosmetics throughout history.

It was once used for men's hair colouring products like Grecian Formula. The manufacturer did not remove lead acetate from its product until 2018. Lead acetate has been replaced by bismuth citrate as the progressive colorant. Its use in cosmetics has been banned in Canada by Health Canada since 2005 (effective at the end of 2006) based on tests showing possible carcinogenicity and reproductive toxicity, and it is also banned in the European Union.

=== Medical uses ===
Lead(II) acetate solution was a commonly used folk remedy for sore nipples. In modern medicine, for a time, it was used as an astringent, in the form of Goulard's extract, and it has also been used to treat poison ivy.

During the Lewis and Clark Expedition, on May 10, 1805, Captain Meriwether Lewis wrote that he used "sugar of lead" mixed with white vitriol and water as a treatment for sore eyes.

In the 1850s, Mary Seacole applied lead(II) acetate, among other remedies, against an epidemic of cholera in Panama.

=== Other historic uses ===
Lead acetate was used in making of slow match during the Middle Ages. It was made by mixing vinegar with litharge, a natural form of lead(II) oxide. It was also used in chemical coloring of metals.

Sugar of lead was a recommended agent added to linseed oil during heating to produce "boiled" linseed oil, the lead and heat acting to cause the oil to cure faster than raw linseed oil.

Lead(II) acetate ("salt of Saturn") was used to synthesise acetone which was then known as "spirit of Saturn" for being made with the salt of Saturn and thought to be a lead compound in the 17th century. Sir Isaac Newton called it not "salt of Saturn" but "sugar of Saturn", Saccharum Saturnii, and used it to make a prism for his refractive experiments by pouring a solution of water and Saccharum Saturnii into a prism made of recycled mirror glass.

== See also ==
- Saturn's Tree
