= Insheeption =

- South Park episode
- Episode no.: Season 14; Episode 10
- Directed by: Trey Parker
- Written by: Trey Parker
- Production code: 1410
- Original air date: October 20, 2010

Episode chronology
← Previous "It's a Jersey Thing"	Next → "Coon 2: Hindsight"
- South Park season 14

"Insheeption" (/ɪnˈʃiːpʃən/) is the tenth episode of the fourteenth season of the American animated television series South Park, and the 205th episode of the series overall. It premiered October 20, 2010, on Comedy Central in the United States. In the episode, Stan and Mr. Mackey suffer a hoarding disorder. In an attempt to find the cause for it, they get trapped in Mr. Mackey's dream. The episode spoofs the TV show Hoarders, Hoarding: Buried Alive, and the film Inception.

The episode was written and directed by series co-creator Trey Parker, and was rated TV-MA-LV in the United States and MA15+(a) in Australia.

== Plot ==
After Wendy expresses concern that Stan suffers from compulsive hoarding, he agrees to have it checked. A hoarding specialist named Dr. Chinstrap, as well as the rest of the student body, help Stan go through his locker, which is stuffed with some disgusting items, including a maggot-infested sandwich and broken toothbrush which Stan, who soon loses his composure, refuses to give up, shocking Kyle, Kenny, Cartman, Wendy and the rest of the school. They send him to Mr. Mackey, who does not know what hoarding is; Stan discovers that Mackey is a hoarder himself.

Stan and Mackey, along with a sheep herder named Mr. Yeoman (repeatedly misidentified as a sheep "hoarder"), are hooked up to a machine which Chinstrap and his assistant Dr. Pinkerton explain that they will help them figure out why they are hoarders by drifting them to their subconscious. Moments later, in Mackey's subconscious, he is being bullied by a boy named Billy Thompson, who threatens to attack Mackey on a field trip the next day. Mackey then runs into Stan and the sheep hoarder who, as the scientists explain, are there because of the power of Mackey's dream. Within the dream, Stan goes home with Mackey and tries to talk him out of the dream, but Mackey instead plays with his Lite-Brite and other 70s-era toys and watches ZOOM. Randy insists he has to rescue his son from the dream despite Chinstrap's warning that he will be stuck there forever.

The dream moves on to the next morning when Stan, Mackey, the sheep hoarder, and the kids board a bus for the field trip. Stan suddenly sees Randy, who, for some reason, has transformed into a butterfly. Stan asks if he has come to help, but Randy reveals that, while that was his intention, he is more concerned with getting "butterfly poon". Pinkerton claims that they have called in another group of "experts" in the form of the main characters from Inception (one of them shapeshifting into NFL quarterback Matt Hasselbeck) to go into the dream to create a "dream within a dream" and rescue them, with Chinstrap providing boombox sounds recreating Inception's music theme during the explanation. The second group, the cast from Inception, comes in shooting at people before going into the dream, where they proceed to shoot even more people in the woods as the group arrives. Stan, the sheep hoarder, and Mackey are introduced to Woodsy Owl, an owl with the tagline "give a hoot, don't pollute" before being put in with Billy and his two friends.

Chinstrap and Pinkerton are now seen courting firefighters to get into the dream and begin trying to explain the events to Sharon (compared to a taco inside of a taco inside a Taco Bell inside a KFC within a mall inside a dream), who claims it all sounds ridiculous and stupid. A pizza guy arrives and is sent in as well, as Sharon is told she does not understand because she is not smart. Within the dream, Mackey and Stan are running from the bullies when Stan convinces Mackey to stand up for himself. Back in reality, Chinstrap decides the dream has become too powerful, and at this point, they must court "the most powerful dream infiltrator in the world" who is Freddy Krueger. While Freddy Krueger does not wish to come back, stating that Chinstrap needed him to murder several teenagers in the belief that it would help 'stop the Russians', they convince him to help out a final time.

Within Mackey's dream, Mackey prepares for a fight, only for the second group of experts to arrive, killing Billy and the tormentors before the firefighters arrive, which they assume would cure Mackey and end the dream. But when they realize Mackey is not waking up, he remembers what happened, explaining he ran from the bullies and went into a shack, where someone talked nicely to him but then touched him in a bad way. Mackey then comes upon that same shack and enters, revealing another young Mackey being sexually molested by Woodsy Owl. Woodsy then turns into a nightmarish monster, killing the sheep hoarder and overpowering the Inception cast before being killed from behind by Freddy Krueger.

With Woodsy destroyed, everyone wakes up, and Mackey explains he must have become a hoarder after believing Woodsy molested him because he wasn't trying hard enough not to pollute. Freddy is beyond remorse because he could not save the sheep herder (ironically, the only one who recognizes him correctly as a shepherd). Having come to terms with Mackey's childhood trauma, they suggest to Stan that he move on to his therapy now, but he claims to have a better idea. He is then seen throwing out the items in his locker. Wendy and Kyle ask him what his problem was, and Stan says that after what happened with Mackey, he does not want any therapy. Kyle suggests that maybe that "was your therapy." Finally, Chinstrap comes out again doing the Inception soundtrack as the episode ends.

== CollegeHumor borrowings ==
Upon the episode's release, Dan Gurewitch from the humor website CollegeHumor, noted several similarities between Insheeption and his own Inception parody video, "Inception Characters Don't Understand Inception", which he had made with David Young and first posted to the CollegeHumor website on July 19, 2010. He discovered that many lines from the South Park episode seemed to be lifted almost verbatim from their sketch. Matt Stone later issued an apology, admitting when they had intended to parody the complexity of Inception, they did not have a copy of the film to reference, instead turning to the internet for information on the film. Stone explained:

"We thought their joke was that a lot of those lines were actually in the movie, and they were banging them against each other, and showing that the Inception characters didn't even know Inception. That was a mistake, and it was an honest mistake… It's just because we do the show in six days, and we're stupid and we just threw it together. But in the end, there are some lines that we had to call and apologize for."

Gurewitch has since said that their apology was accepted, and that he and Young plan to "meet up with Matt and Trey when they're in New York."

== Reception ==
=== Ratings ===
In its original American broadcast on October 20, 2010, "Insheeption" was seen by 2.891 million viewers according to Nielsen Media Research, making it the most watched cable television show of the night. The episode received a 1.8 rating/3 share, meaning it was seen by 1.8 percent of the population, and 3 percent of people watching television at the time of its broadcast. Among adult viewers between ages 18 and 49, the episode received a 1.6 rating/5 share, dropping three-tenths in the ratings in stated demographic since the previous episode. Among male viewers between ages 18 and 34, the episode scored a 3.4 rating/11 share.

=== Critical response ===
Emily St. James of The A.V. Club gave the episode a B rating.

IGN gave the episode a score of 7 out of 10 and wrote: "This episode had a great premise, and I did find myself laughing a couple of times (Cartman's few lines in this story are hilarious), but this installment gave me the impression that the creative team weren't really trying that hard. I've said it before, but it bears repeating – it seems like these new episodes are more like Robot Chicken fare (no offense to you RC lovers out there, though South Park is not to be compared to Robot Chicken), than the usual stuff we've come to expect from SP. Maybe the team is distracted by other things, or maybe the debacle with the Mohammed episode took some wind out of their sails, but the spark seems to be missing, and I'm hoping it returns soon."

TVfanatic.com rated the episode 4 out of 5 and said, "We thought the episode was actually pretty spot on and fantastic."

== Home media ==
Insheeption, along with the thirteen other episodes from South Park's fourteenth season, were released on a three-disc DVD set and two-disc Blu-ray set in the United States on April 26, 2011.
