= Basic lead acetate =

Identifiers
CAS Number	1335-32-6
3D model (JSmol)	Interactive image
ChemSpider	4447479
ECHA InfoCard	100.014.210
EC Number	215-630-3
PubChem CID	5284406
UNII	BW7DT27250
UN number	2291 1616
CompTox Dashboard (EPA)	DTXSID1020774
- InChI: InChI=1S/2C2H4O2.4H2O.3Pb/c2*1-2(3)4;;;;;;;/h2*1H3,(H,3,4);4*1H2;;;/q;;;;;;3*+2/p-6 Key: VLOJXAQYHIVPFI-UHFFFAOYSA-H
- SMILES: CC(=O)[O-].CC(=O)[O-].[OH-].[OH-].[OH-].[OH-].[Pb+2].[Pb+2].[Pb+2]

Properties
Chemical formula	C_{4}H_{10}O_{8}Pb_{3}
Molar mass	807.7 g·mol^{−1}
Appearance	white solid

Hazards
- GHS labelling
Pictograms	(GHS08: Health hazard) (GHS09: Environmental hazard)
Signal word	Warning
Hazard statements	H351, H360, H373, H410
Precautionary statements	P201, P202, P260, P273, P281, P308+P313, P314, P391, P405, P501
- Except where otherwise noted, data are given for materials in their standard state (at 25 °C [77 °F], 100 kPa). Infobox references

Basic lead acetate, also known as subacetate of lead, is the inorganic compound with the formula Pb_{3}(OH)_{4}(O_{2}CCH_{3})_{2}. A white solid, it is one of several lead acetates.

== History ==
Goulard's extract is a solution of lead(II) acetate and lead(II) oxide used as an astringent during the 18th, 19th and early 20th centuries. It was named after its introducer, Thomas Goulard. Lead poisoning and the development of more effective astringents caused doctors to abandon its use. Synonymous or very closely related formulations were known as liquor plumbi subacetis dilutus, eau de Goulard, extract of Saturn, vinegar of Saturn, and liquid acetate of lead. The white water eau de Saturne differed from eau de Goulard in not containing alcohol, but was often confused with it. Goulard's extract was a primary ingredient in both Goulard's cerate and Goulard's water.
