= Lead acetate =

Lead acetate can refer to:

- Lead subacetate (Basic lead acetate), Pb_{3}(OH)_{4}(CH_{3}COO)_{2}
- Lead(IV) acetate (plumbic acetate), Pb(CH_{3}COO)_{4}
- Lead(II) acetate (lead diacetate), Pb(CH_{3}COO)_{2} and the trihydrate Pb(CH_{3}COO)_{2}^{.}3H_{2}O
