= Kank-A =

Kank-A is an American brand of liquid pharmaceutical product marketed by Blistex used primarily to treat canker sores. It is applied directly on the sore and works by numbing the local area (with benzocaine) to prevent discomfort and forming a protective mucous barrier with a compound benzoin tincture that protects the ulcer from further irritation, allowing it to heal more rapidly.

As of 2014, Kank-A comes in two varieties, the original providing oral pain relief against canker sores, and a soft gel that provides oral pain relief of toothaches.
