= Odor-Eaters =

American foot-care brand

Odor-Eaters is an American brand of foot-care products designed to reduce foot odor. The line started with insoles that are made of latex and contain activated carbon, which neutralizes odors. As of January 2011, the brand is owned by Blistex Inc.

== History ==
Odor-Eaters is an American brand of foot-care products designed to reduce foot odor. Herbert Lapidus invented the namesake insoles while employed as Combe Incorporated's head of a research and development. The insoles are made of latex and contain activated carbon, which neutralizes odors. Combe already marketed Johnson's Foot Soap, so it introduced the product under the Johnson's brand in 1974.

Combe extended the brand beyond insoles to include odor-reducing foot sprays. In 1981, Combe licensed Chipman-Union to manufacture socks under the Odor-Eaters brand name. The socks contained an odor inhibiting agent that withstood laundering. Kmart and Walmart carried the socks. Production of the socks ended in 2011.

In January 2011, Combe sold its foot care product line to Blistex Inc.

== Sponsorship ==
In 1988, Combe took over sponsorship of a national Rotten Sneakers Contest to promote its Odor-Eaters brand. A Vermont sporting goods store owner originated the event in 1979, to advertise athletic shoes. Blistex continues to market the Odor-Eaters products and to sponsor the Rotten Sneakers Contest.
