= Grecian Formula =

Men's hair dye brand

Grecian Formula was a men's hair coloring product from Combe Incorporated. Until 2018 (see below) the formulation used in the United States contained lead(II) acetate. Because lead acetate was banned in cosmetics in Canada and the European Union, the formulations sold there did not contain it. In 2017, the Environmental Defense Fund and other consumer groups filed a complaint with the Food and Drug Administration to force the removal of lead acetate from Grecian Formula and other hair dyes. As of July 2018, ingredients of Grecian Formula are water, isopropyl alcohol, triethanolamine, bismuth citrate, sodium thiosulfate, fragrance, and panthenol. Lead acetate has been replaced by bismuth citrate as the progressive colorant.
