= Clearasil =

Brand of skin care and acne medication

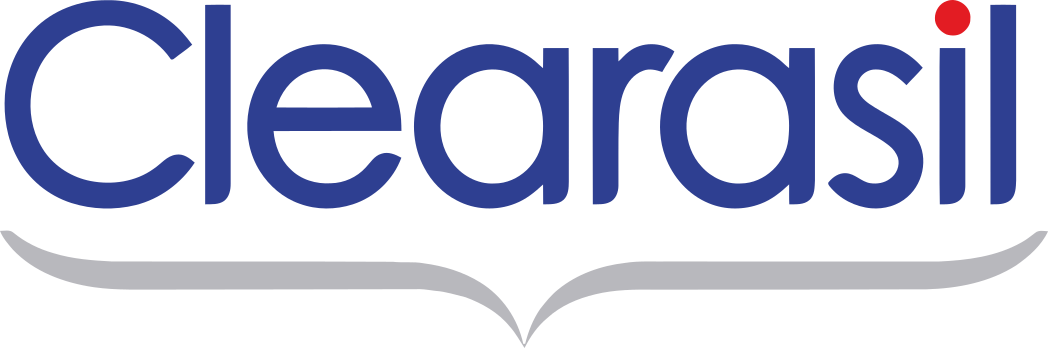
- Logo
- Current owner: Reckitt Benckiser
- Country: United States
- Introduced: 1950; 76 years ago
- Previous owners: Ivan Combe; Richardson-Vicks; Procter & Gamble; Boots Healthcare International
- Website: www.clearasil.com

Clearasil is an American brand of skin care and acne medication, whose products contain chiefly benzoyl peroxide, sulfur and resorcinol, triclosan, or salicylic acid as active ingredients. Clearasil has a wide range of products both for rapid and sometimes slow acne treatment and for everyday prevention. The products are marketed to customers worldwide.

== History ==
Clearasil was invented in the United States in 1950 by Ivan Combe with the help of chemist Kedzie Teller. At this time, it was the first dermatological brand created specially for younger skin to fight against pimples (acne). The active ingredients in the original product were sulfur and resorcinol, similar to the pre-existing adult acne product Acnomel. Combe used the popular ABC television show American Bandstand to help promote the product and its superior smell.

In 1960 the brand was bought by Richardson-Vicks. In 1975, Wolfman Jack signed a contract promoting the product Clearasil Acne Ointment. In 1985 Richardson-Vicks was acquired by Procter & Gamble together with Clearasil. In 2000 Clearasil moved to the Boots Group portfolio. In 2006 Boots Healthcare International was purchased by the British-Dutch company Reckitt Benckiser.

== Controversy ==
A 2018 ad titled Pimples Make Terrible Prom Dates was called homophobic by critics, who accused it of promoting anti-gay stereotypes. The ad features two teenage girls preparing for Prom, when one discovers a pimple. The pimple is shown as an effeminate man with a shrieking voice in a pink ruffled suit who punctuates his words with a flamboyant kick before flipping his hair back and settling into a pointed toe pose. After, an application of Clearasil kills it, and their prom dates are saved.

== See also ==
- Benzoyl peroxide
