= Blistex =

American Consumer Discretionary Company

Blistex Inc.
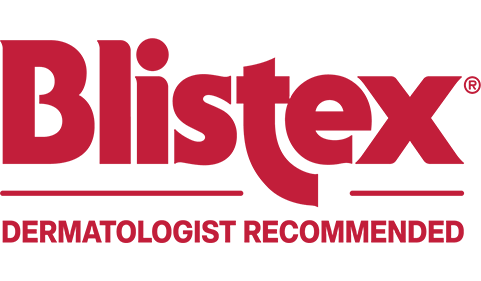
- Type: Private
- Industry: Personal Care Products
- Founded: 1947; 79 years ago
- Headquarters: Oak Brook, Illinois, US
- Products: Pharmaceuticals
- Website: blistex.com

Blistex Inc. is an American consumer products company headquartered in Oak Brook, Illinois. Founded in 1947, in the business of developing and marketing lip care products, its offerings have grown to include other brands including Odor-Eaters, Stridex, and Kank-A.

== Description ==
Blistex Inc. was founded in 1947 in the business of developing and marketing lip care products. It manufactures and sells a wide range of lip balm, lip ointment, and other lip-related products under the Blistex brand name.

Blistex is headquartered outside of Chicago in Oak Brook, Illinois. The company operates a production facility in Oak Brook, Illinois, and is a member of the Illinois Manufacturers' Association. As of November 2021, Blistex products are sold around the world.
