= Aqua Velva =

American brand of grooming products

Aqua Velva is an American brand of grooming products targeted at men. Its best-known product is the Ice Blue aftershave introduced in 1917 by the J.B. Williams Company.

== History ==
Aqua Velva was first trademarked in 1917 by the J.B. Williams Company and later acquired by the Beecham Group in 1982, SmithKline Beecham in 1989, then by GlaxoSmithKline from 2000 until it was sold to Combe Incorporated in 2002. As of 2016, it is marketed by Combe Incorporated and Unilever (formerly Sara Lee) in Europe. Aqua Velva products include Classic Ice Blue, Ice Sport, and Musk, as well as Original Sport (sold only in Canada). The Classic Ice Blue serves as the original version of Aqua Velva.

Combe Incorporated began shipping Aqua Velva exclusively in plastic "Shatterproof" bottles on February 1, 2010. Previously, it had been packaged in glass bottles. The change was made reportedly at customer request, and the new plastic packaging contains the same product, with no changes in formulation.

== Reception ==
In James Jones' autobiographical war novel The Thin Red Line, a PX store is set up behind the lines during the Battle of Guadalcanal, which stocked exactly two products: Barbasol shaving foam and Aqua Velva aftershave. Within seven hours, the entire Aqua Velva stock was sold out, while plenty of Barbasol was still available. The reason for this was the high alcohol content of Aqua Velva; mixed with canned grapefruit juice, the aftershave tasted passable and ensured a “solid high” for the narrator's entire company. Later, the alcohol in Aqua Velva was denatured with denatonium benzoate.

In a nod to the blue color, a cocktail called Aqua Velva is made with vodka, gin, lemon-lime, and blue curacao. Among other things, this is discussed in the film Zodiac — The Killer's Trail as the favorite drink of author Robert Graysmith.

Gallery

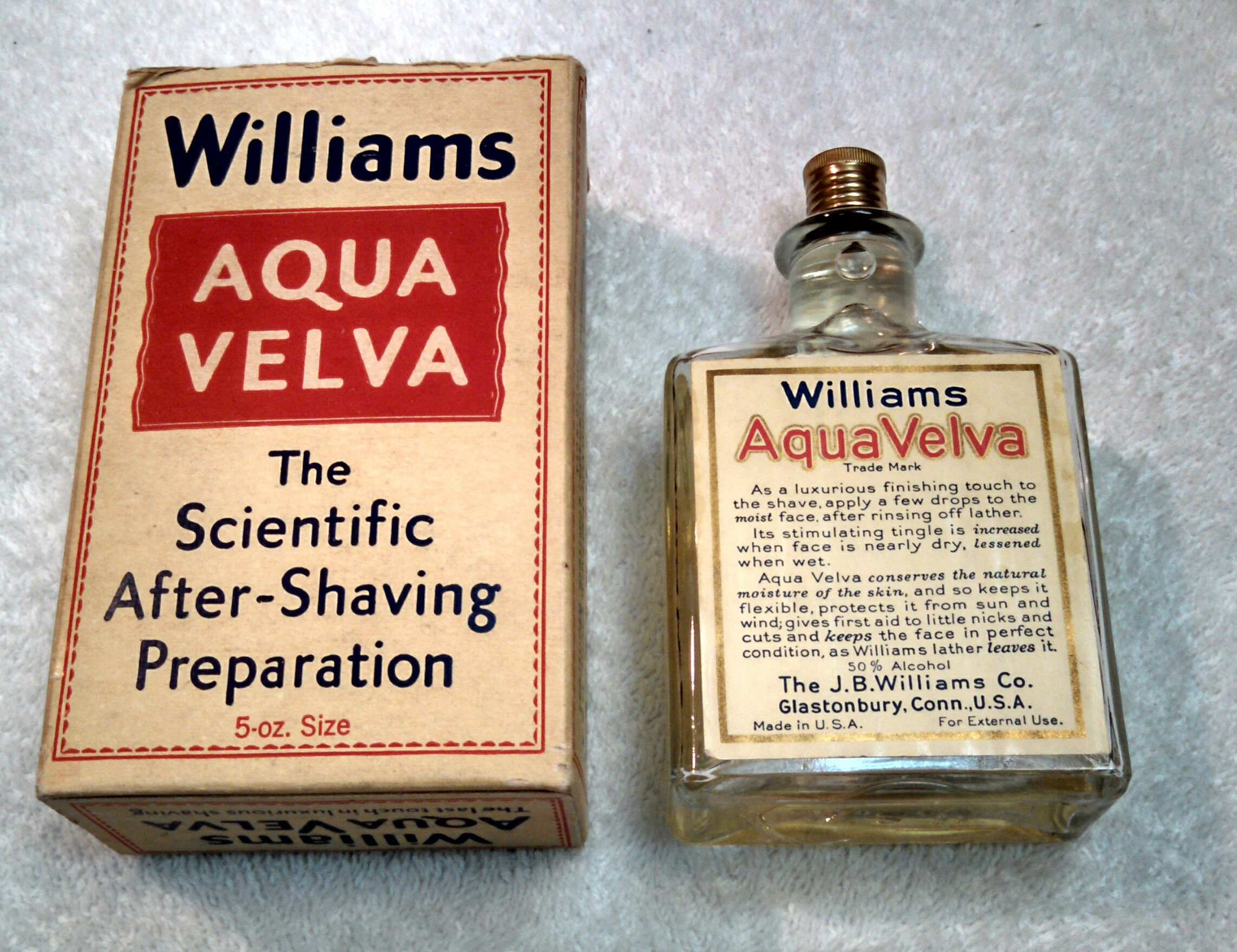
Original Aqua Velva bottle from the 1930s

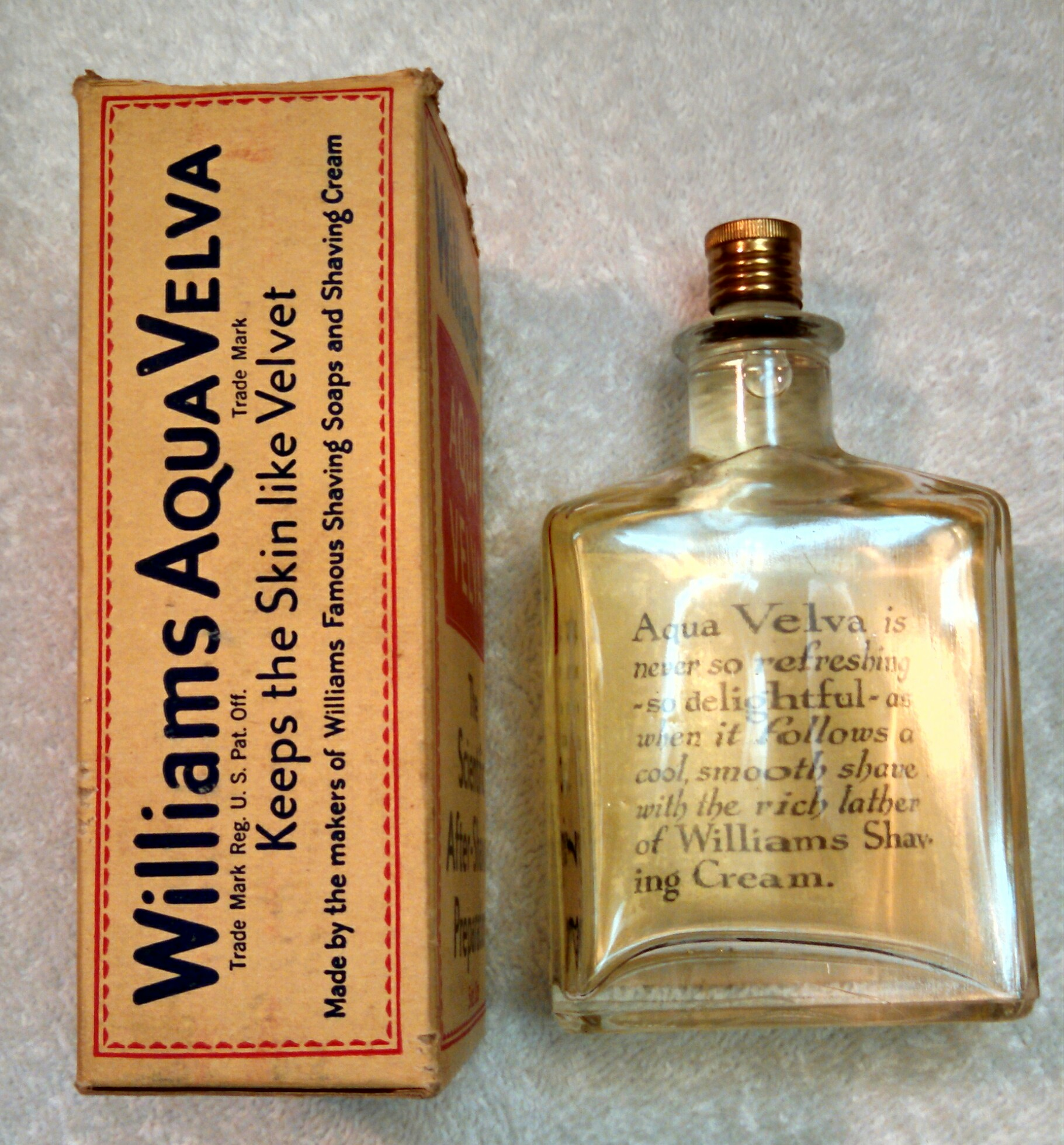
Aqua Velva bottle from the 1930s, showing the back of bottle and side of the outer box

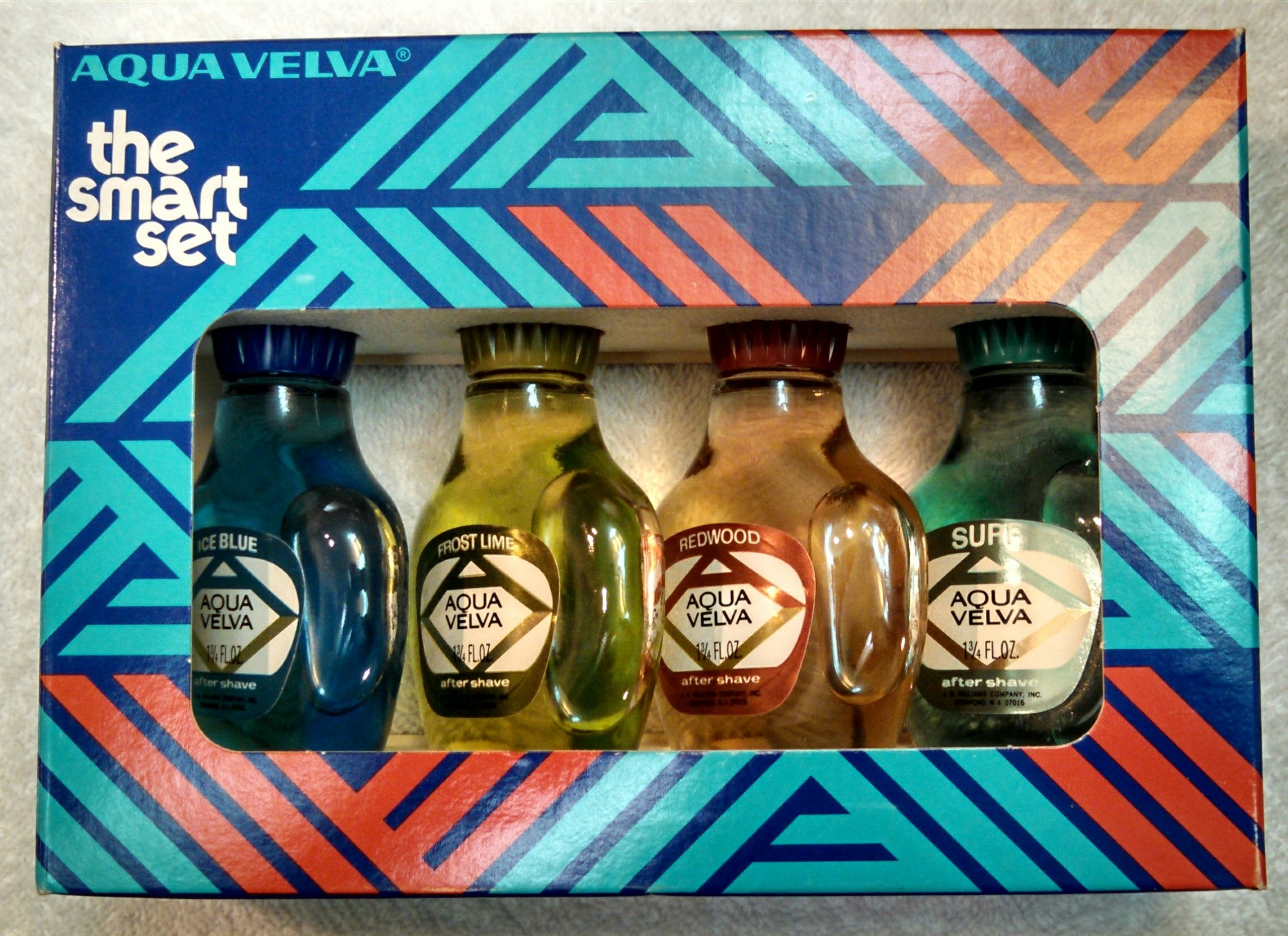
"The Smart Set" from the 1970s: a combination of Aqua Velva aftershave scents normally sold around the holidays.

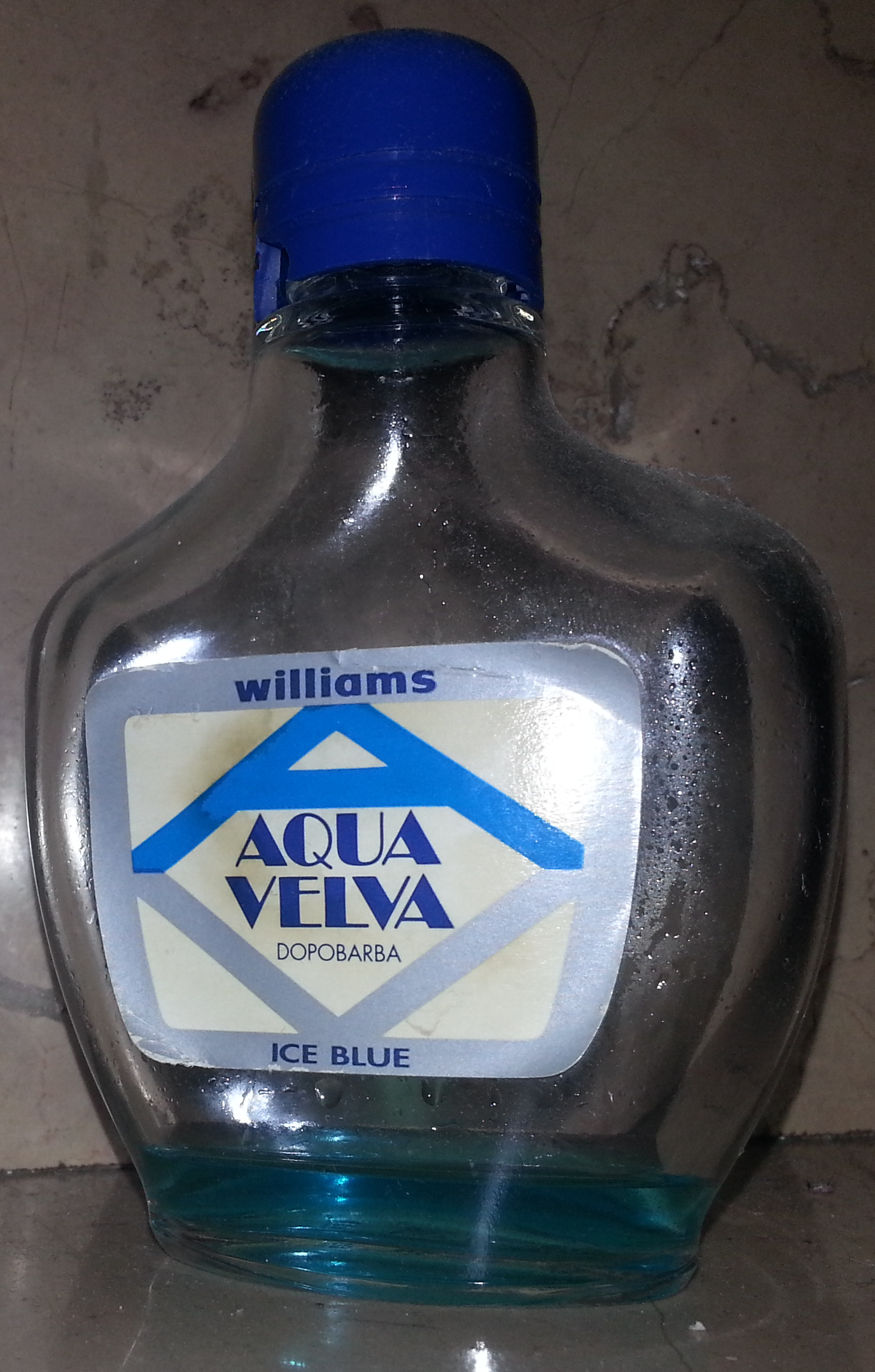
"Williams Aqua Velva" in 100 ml glass bottle (marketed in Italy)

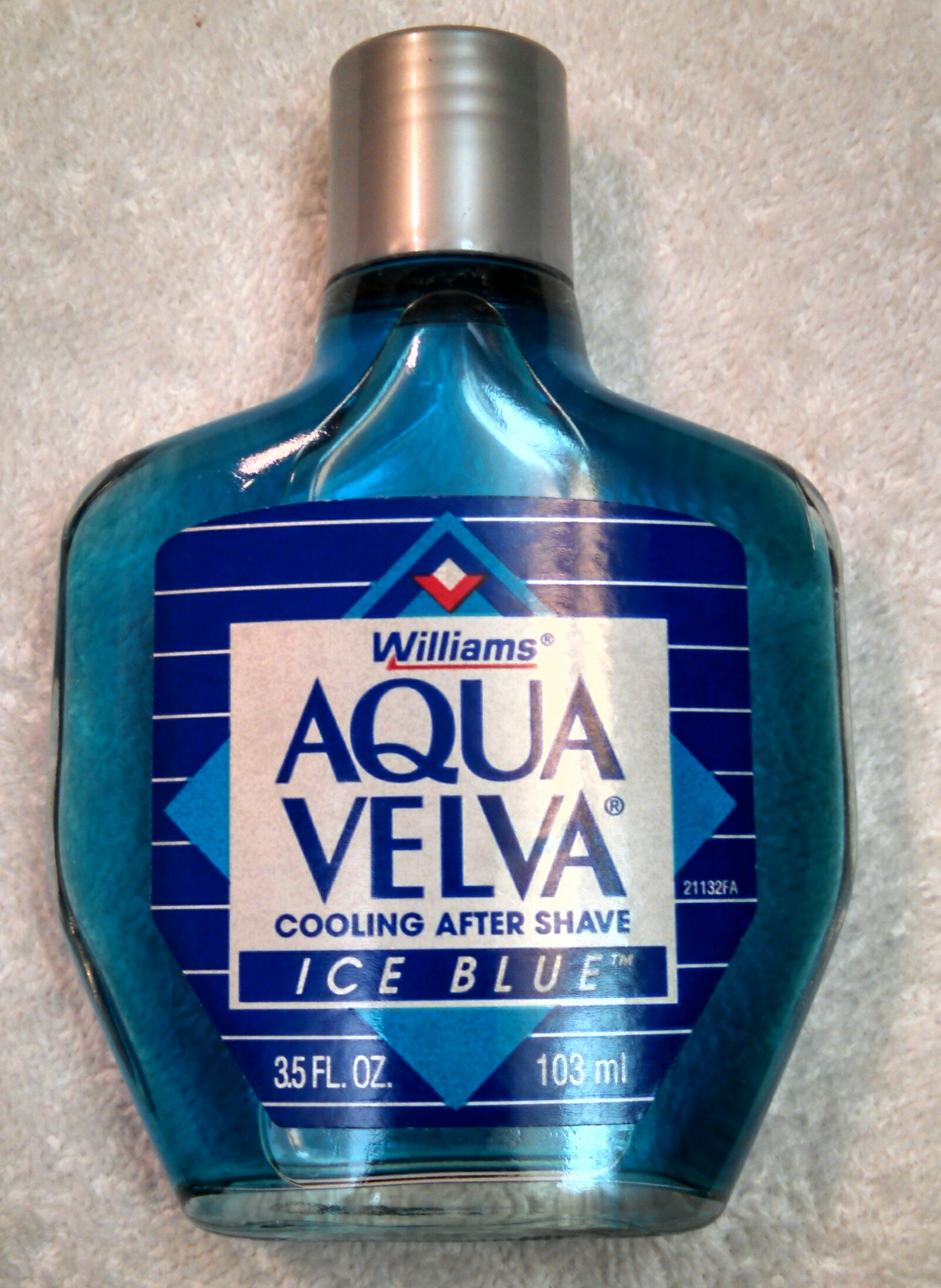
Aqua Velva Ice Blue bottle from the early 2000s

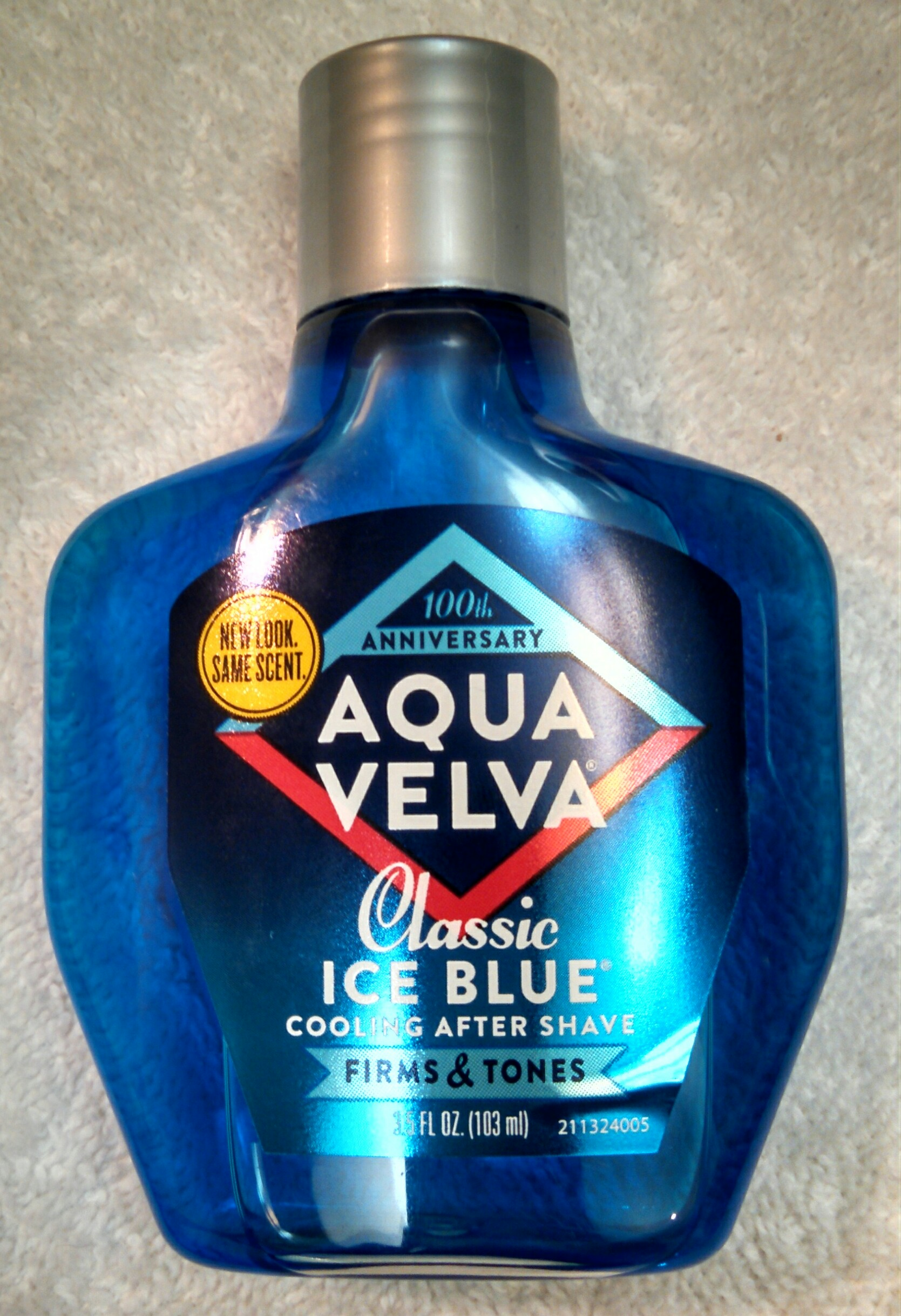
A 100th-anniversary Aqua Velva Ice Blue bottle from 2017

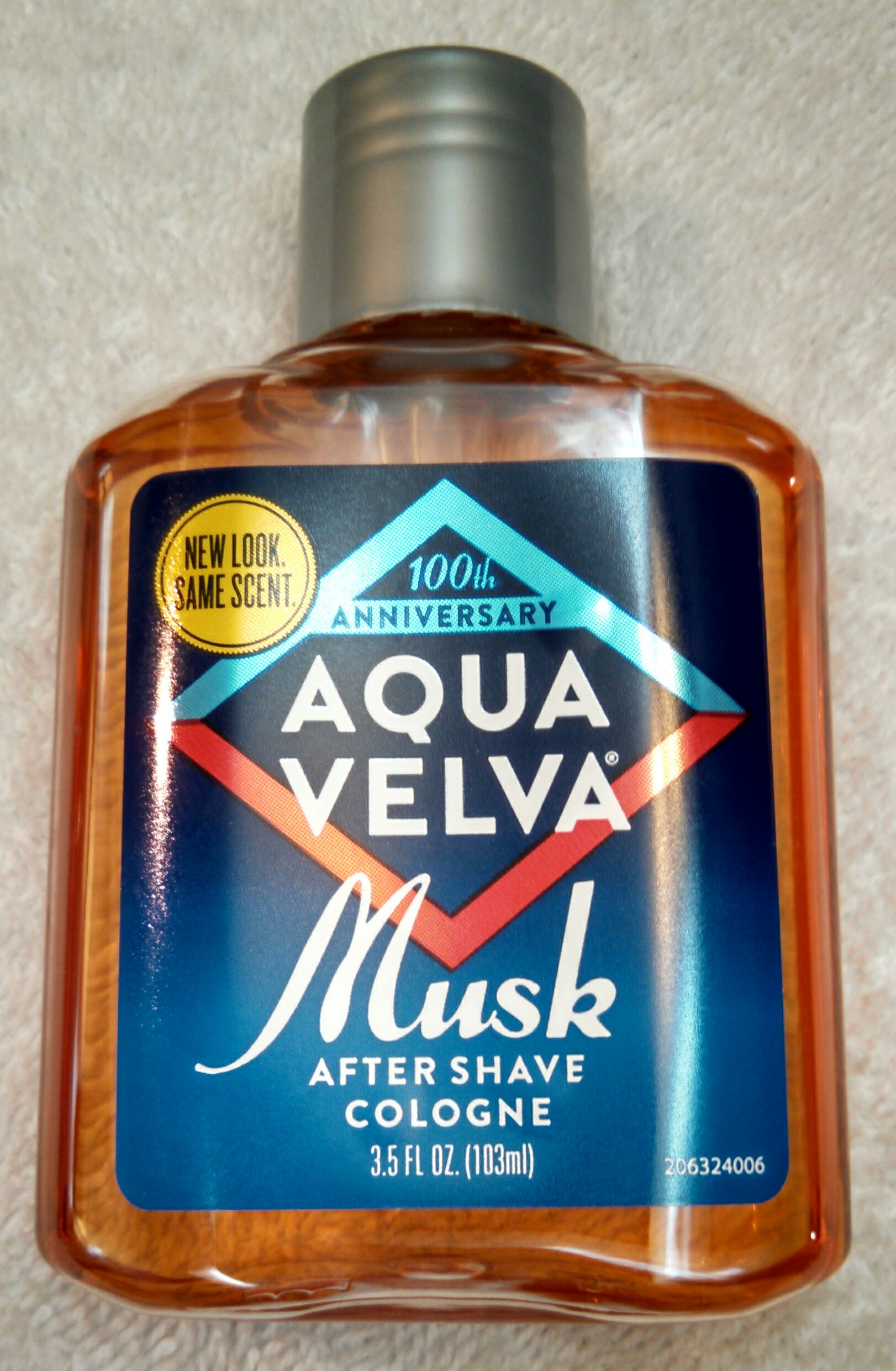
A 100th-anniversary Aqua Velva Musk bottle from 2017
