= Aqua Velva (cocktail) =

Vodka and gin based cocktail

- Origin: Aqua Velva
- Colour: Blue
- Ingredients: Vodka, gin, lemon-lime, pineapple juice and Blue Curaçao
- Base spirit: Vodka

An Aqua Velva is a cocktail made with vodka, gin, lemon-lime, and blue curaçao. The curaçao gives the drink the color of Ice Blue Aqua Velva aftershave, which was advertised with the slogan that it "gives your skin a drink."

In the 2007 film Zodiac, the cocktail is depicted as author Robert Graysmith's favored drink. The cocktail's origins prior to the film are uncertain.

== See also ==
- Blue Lagoon (cocktail)
