= Astringent =

Chemical compound that tends to shrink or constrict body tissues

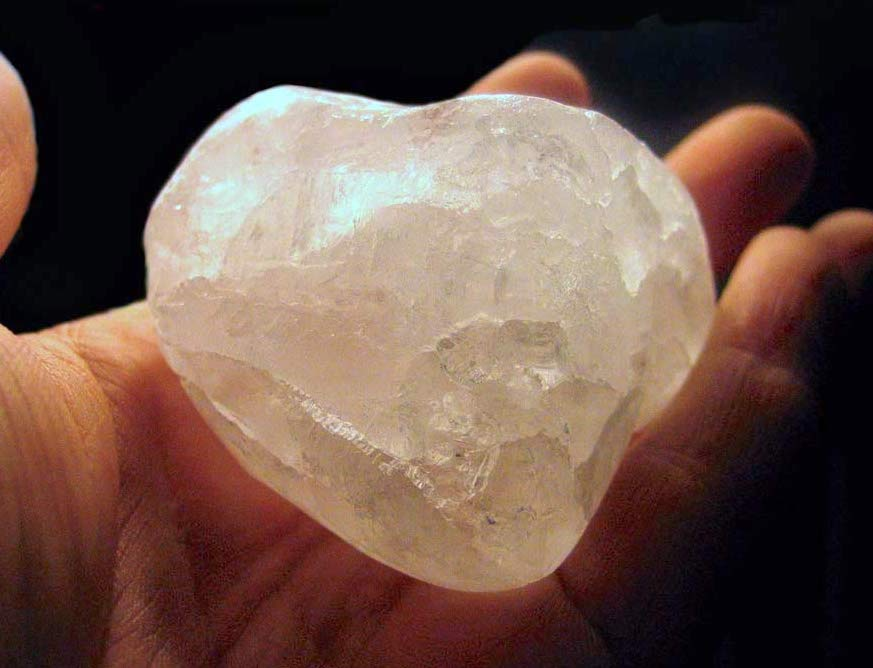
A crystal of the astringent alum

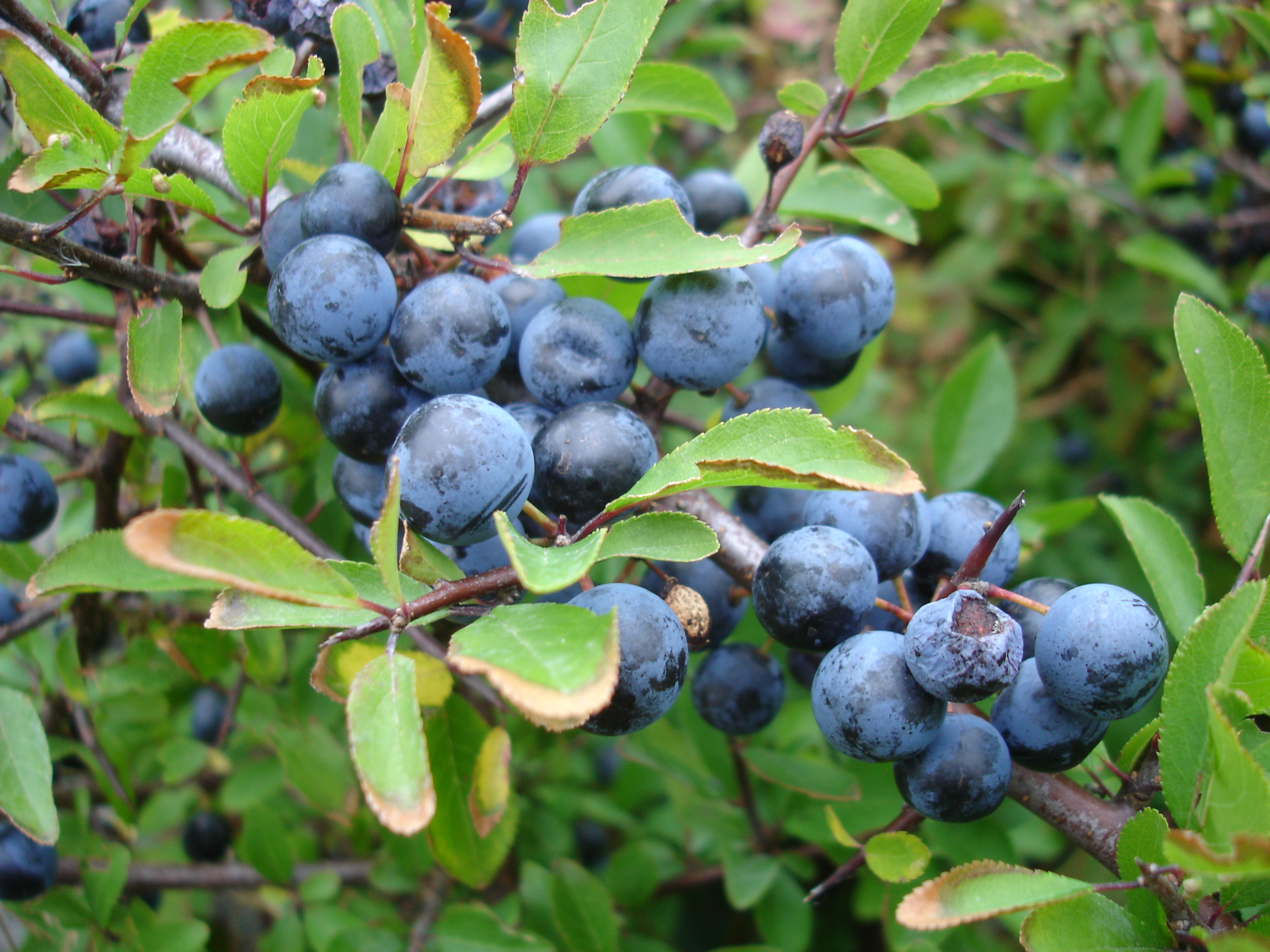
The astringents and acids in fresh blackthorn berries (sloes) give the fruit its sourness.

An astringent (sometimes called adstringent) is a chemical that shrinks or constricts body tissues. The word derives from the Latin adstringere, which means "to bind fast". Astringency, the dry, puckering or numbing mouthfeel caused by the tannins in unripe fruits, lets the fruit mature by deterring eating. Tannins, being a kind of polyphenol, bind salivary proteins and make them precipitate and aggregate, producing a rough, "sandpapery", or dry sensation in the mouth.

In a scientific study, astringency was still detectable by subjects who had local anesthesia applied to their taste nerves, but not when both these and the trigeminal nerves were disabled.

== Uses ==
In medicine, astringents cause constriction or contraction of mucous membranes and exposed tissues and are often used internally to reduce discharge of blood serum and mucous secretions. This can happen with a sore throat, hemorrhages, diarrhea, and peptic ulcers. Externally applied astringents, which cause mild coagulation of skin proteins, dry, harden, and protect the skin. People with acne are often advised to use astringents if they have oily skin. Mild astringents relieve such minor skin irritations as those resulting from superficial cuts; allergies; insect bites; anal hemorrhoids; and fungal infections such as athlete's foot. Redness-reducing eye drops contain an astringent. Use of Goulard's extract has been discontinued since being found to cause lead poisoning.

== Examples ==
Some common astringents are alum, acacia, sage, yarrow, witch hazel, bayberry, distilled vinegar, very cold water, and rubbing alcohol. Astringent preparations include silver nitrate, potassium permanganate, zinc oxide, zinc sulfate, Burow's solution, tincture of benzoin, and such vegetable substances as tannic and gallic acids. Balaustines are the red rose-like flowers of the pomegranate, which are very bitter to the taste. In medicine, their dried form has been used as an astringent. Some metal salts and acids have also been used as astringents.

Calamine lotion, witch hazel, and yerba mansa are astringents, as are the powdered leaves of the myrtle. Ripe fruits and fruit parts including blackthorn (sloe berries), Aronia chokeberry, chokecherry, bird cherry, rhubarb, quince, jabuticaba and persimmon fruits (especially when unripe), banana skins (or unripe bananas), cashew fruits and acorns are astringent. Citrus fruits, like lemons, are somewhat astringent. The tannins in some teas, coffee, and red grape wines like Cabernet Sauvignon and Merlot produce mild astringency. Astringency is used in classifications of white wine.
