= The Real Housewives of New Jersey season 9 =

Season of television series

The Real Housewives of New Jersey
- Season 9
- Starring: Teresa Giudice; Melissa Gorga; Dolores Catania; Margaret Josephs; Jennifer Aydin; Jackie Goldschneider
- No. of episodes: 18

Release
- Original network: Bravo
- Original release: November 7, 2018 – March 6, 2019

Season chronology
- ← Previous; Season 8 Next → Season 10

The ninth season of The Real Housewives of New Jersey, an American reality television series, aired on Bravo in the United States. The season WAS primarily filmed in New Jersey in 2018, and the reunion in January 2019. The season was announced by Bravo on September 21, 2018. The season premiered on November 7, 2018. The season finale aired on February 13, 2019, and a three-part reunion special in February and March 2019.

The season focuses on the lives of returning cast members Teresa Giudice, Melissa Gorga, Dolores Catania, Margaret Josephs and new cast members Jennifer Aydin and Jackie Goldschneider. Original cast member Danielle Staub appears as a friend of the housewives for the second consecutive season.

== Production and crew ==
The Real Housewives of New Jersey was officially renewed for its ninth season on April 11, 2018. Amy Kohn, Deanna Markoff, Dorothy Toran, Jessica Sebastian, Jordana Hochman, Lauren Volonakis, Lucilla D'Agostino, Luke Neslage and Andy Cohen are recognized as the series' executive producers; it is produced and distributed by Sirens Media.

== Cast and synopsis ==
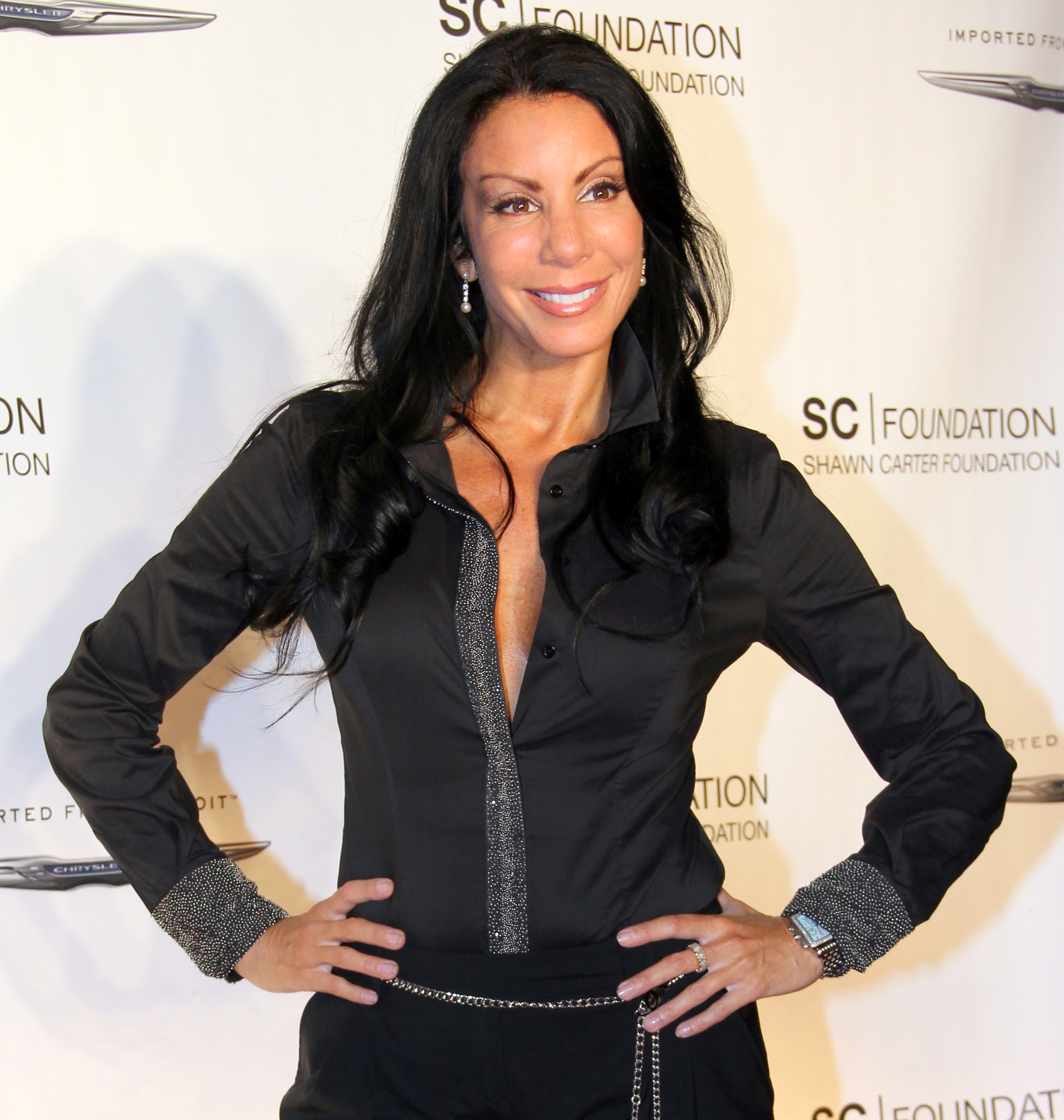
Danielle Staub appears in a recurring role.

In December 2017, it was announced Siggy Flicker had departed the series. Teresa Giudice, Margaret Josephs, Dolores Catania, and Melissa Gorga returned for the season, while former housewife Danielle Staub returned in a "friend of" capacity, with Jennifer Aydin and Jackie Goldschneider joining the cast.

== Episodes ==
The Real Housewives of New Jersey season 9 episodes
No. overall	No. in season	Title	Original release date	U.S. viewers (millions)
149	1	"Wives and Misdemeanors"	November 7, 2018	1.19
150	2	"Easter Wives Hunt"	November 14, 2018	1.02
151	3	"The Jersey Breakfast Club"	November 21, 2018	0.92
152	4	"Housewives & Heifers"	November 28, 2018	1.14
153	5	"Turkish Delights"	December 5, 2018	1.15
154	6	"Last Fling Before the Ring"	December 12, 2018	1.00
155	7	"Brunch Gone Bad"	December 19, 2018	1.18
156	8	"Bridezilla of Bimini"	December 30, 2018	1.37
157	9	"Communion and Confession"	January 2, 2019	1.18
158	10	"From Turkey with Love"	January 9, 2019	1.29
159	11	"Whine Country"	January 16, 2019	1.12
160	12	"Mudslinging in Mexico"	January 23, 2019	1.32
161	13	"Camels, Cabo & Catfights"	January 30, 2019	1.41
162	14	"Heroines in Heels"	February 6, 2019	1.31
163	15	"Hotheads and Hookahs"	February 13, 2019	1.20
164	16	"Reunion Part 1"	February 20, 2019	1.36
165	17	"Reunion Part 2"	February 27, 2019	1.36
166	18	"Reunion Part 3"	March 6, 2019	1.50
