= The Real Housewives of New Jersey season 10 =

American reality television series

The Real Housewives of New Jersey
- Season 10
- Starring: Teresa Giudice; Melissa Gorga; Dolores Catania; Margaret Josephs; Jennifer Aydin; Jackie Goldschneider
- No. of episodes: 19

Release
- Original network: Bravo
- Original release: November 6, 2019 – March 18, 2020

Season chronology
- ← Previous; Season 9 Next → Season 11

The tenth season of The Real Housewives of New Jersey, an American reality television series, aired on Bravo. The season was primarily taped in New Jersey from March 2019 to June 2019, while the reunion was shot in January 2020. It was announced by Bravo on September 25, 2019 and premiered on November 6, with the finale airing on February 26, 2020, ahead of a three-part reunion special in March 2020.

The season focuses on the lives of returning cast members Teresa Giudice, Melissa Gorga, Dolores Catania, Margaret Josephs, Jennifer Aydin, and Jackie Goldschneider. Original cast member Danielle Staub once again appears as a friend of the housewives for the third and final time.

== Production and crew ==
Amy Kohn, Dorothy Toran, Jessica Sebastian, Jordana Hochman, Lauren Volonakis, and Andy Cohen are recognized as the series' executive producers; it is produced and distributed by Sirens Media.

== Cast and synopsis ==
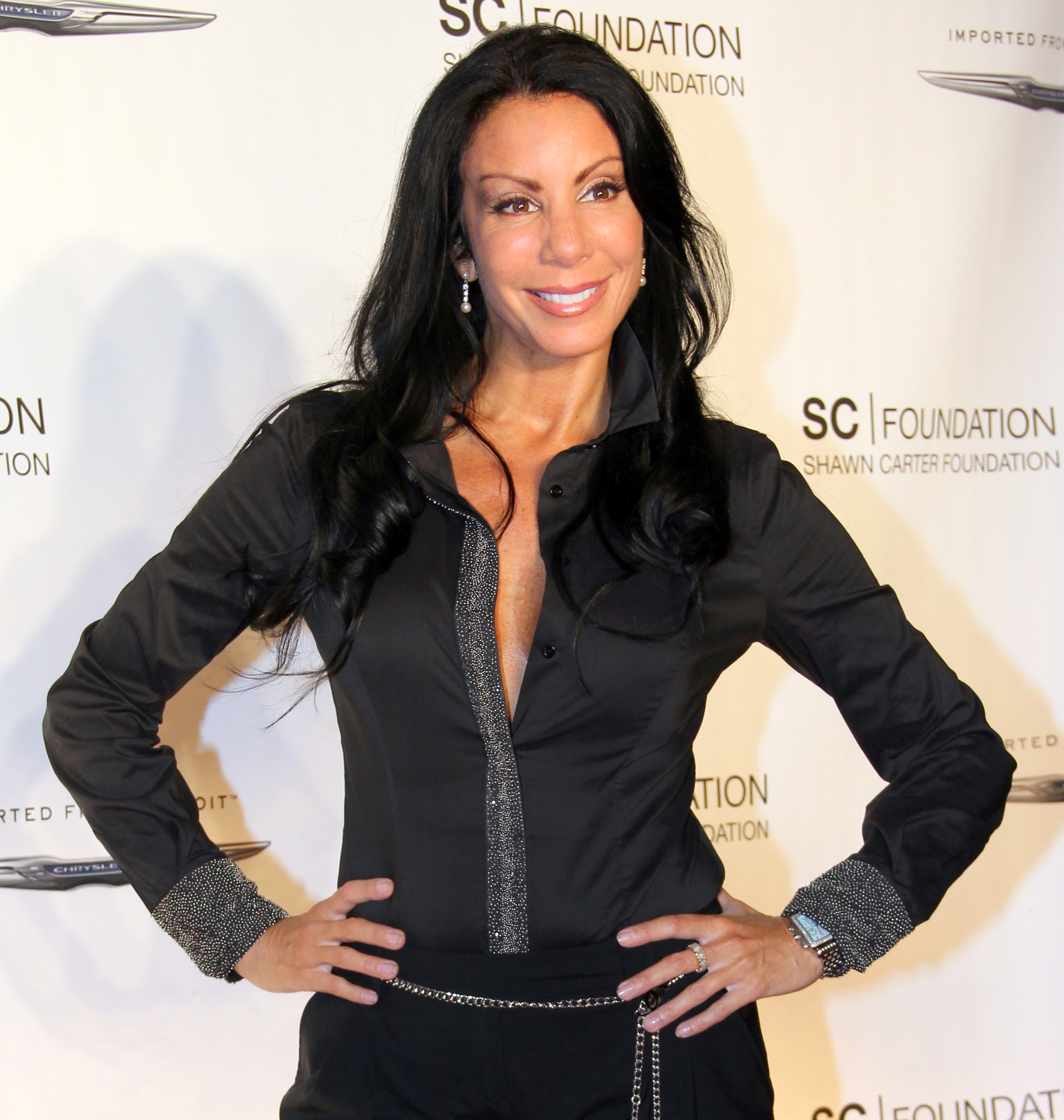
Danielle Staub appears in a recurring role.

In April 2019, former cast member Caroline Manzo declined an offer to return to the series as a friend of the housewives, calling it "insulting" for producers to offer her a non full-time role. The cast from season nine remained, with Danielle Staub appearing as a friend of the housewives for the third consecutive season.

An after show for the tenth season started streaming online via YouTube on December 11, 2019. It features all six main cast members, Staub, Marty Caffrey, Joe Benigno and Frank Catania giving their commentary about the recent episode.

In January 2020, Staub stated on Watch What Happens Live with Andy Cohen that she would be leaving the series for the second time after the season. In the same month, a reunion special for the tenth season was filmed in New Jersey Performing Arts Center, with Cohen serving as the host.

== Episodes ==
The Real Housewives of New Jersey season 10 episodes
No. overall	No. in season	Title	Original release date	U.S. viewers (millions)
-	-	"Joe and Teresa: Unlocked"	October 27, 2019	1.27
Andy Cohen interviews Teresa and Joe Guidice regarding their status in life.
167	1	"Sex, Lies and Video Debates"	November 6, 2019	1.23
Teresa awaits the release of her husband from prison, while rumors of her cheating spread. Jackie confronts Jennifer about a video.
168	2	"On Lock Down"	November 13, 2019	1.06
Teresa and her daughters struggle as Joe Guidice is released from prison and transferred to an immigration detention facility. Dolores organizes an event to get Teresa's mind off her troubles, and Danielle clashes with both Jennifer and Margaret.
169	3	"40 and Fancy Free"	November 20, 2019	1.01
Melissa worries about her birthday party. Marge Sr. goes job hunting in the city. Dolores tries to move her relationship forward with her boyfriend. Ramona Singer of The Real Housewives of New York City appears.
170	4	"Jamaican Jailbait"	November 27, 2019	0.96
The women head to Jamaica for Jennifer's birthday. Dolores reveals her dislike of Jackie. Teresa responds to Margaret's joke about alleged infidelity.
171	5	"Cut from a Different Cloth"	December 4, 2019	1.09
The feud between Jackie and Dolores continues. Teresa confronts Margaret for making fun about the cheating rumors. The women speculate on Joe Guidice's fate.
172	6	"Baby Breezes and Bad News"	December 11, 2019	1.01
Dolores' former husband and boyfriend sit down. Teresa reveals that Danielle slept with Marty again. Joe Giudice gets a decision about his immigration appeal.
173	7	"The Last Supper"	December 18, 2019	0.95
The women prepare for Easter as Teresa's family deals with Joe losing his immigration appeal. Jennifer's daughter discovers the sexual orientation of her uncle. Jackie talks about the challenges of her eating disorder.
174	8	"Hair Today, Gone Tomorrow"	January 1, 2020	1.19
Teresa invites Danielle and the rest of the women shopping, where an altercation occurs between Margaret and Danielle.
175	9	"Abs & Jabs"	January 8, 2020	1.30
Melissa prepares for her fashion show, in which Dolores' son will be walking. Teresa sides with Danielle over Margaret. Jackie discusses her eating issues with her kids and father.
176	10	"Mama Drama"	January 15, 2020	1.14
Margaret hosts a Mother's Day brunch. Jackie plans a trip, hoping for a reconciliation between Margaret and Teresa. Jennifer tries to convince her mother to accept her brother's sexual orientation.
177	11	"Clearing the Heir"	January 22, 2020	1.26
The ladies' vacation gets turned upside down when Jennifer throws utensils at Melissa. Teresa opens up to the women about her relationship with her husband.
178	12	"The Hamptons Hangover"	January 29, 2020	1.30
Unable to make peace with Jackie and Melissa, Jennifer leaves the trip early. Teresa visits her husband in the detention facility. Margaret deals with her mother, Marge Sr.
179	13	"Sorry Not Sorry"	February 5, 2020	1.29
Margaret hosts a twentieth anniversary party for her business. Joe Gorga confronts Bill Aydin regarding their sex life.
180	14	"Something in the Water"	February 12, 2020	1.13
Jennifer considers apologizing to Melissa, as the ladies head to Jersey Shore for another getaway.
181	15	"Secrets Revealed"	February 19, 2020	1.18
On vacation at the Jersey Shore, Jennifer and Margaret continue to clash. Melissa sits down with Danielle, who reveals that Teresa encouraged her to assault Margaret.
182	16	"Family Reunion"	February 26, 2020	1.35
Teresa learns that Danielle has thrown her under the bus. Months later, she and her daughters travel to Italy to visit her recently deported husband, as they decide the fate of their marriage.
183	17	"Reunion Part 1"	March 4, 2020	1.28
The cast of The Real Housewives of New Jersey sit down with Andy Cohen to relive the moments of the season.
184	18	"Reunion Part 2"	March 11, 2020	1.31
Danielle Staub faces the women.
185	19	"Reunion Part 3"	March 18, 2020	1.32
The reunion concludes as Danielle Staub says goodbye and departs the series for a final time.
