= The Real Housewives of New Jersey season 8 =

The Real Housewives of New Jersey
- Season 8
- Starring: Teresa Giudice; Melissa Gorga; Dolores Catania; Siggy Flicker; Margaret Josephs
- No. of episodes: 16

Release
- Original network: Bravo
- Original release: October 4, 2017 – January 31, 2018

Season chronology
- ← Previous; Season 7 Next → Season 9

The eighth season of The Real Housewives of New Jersey, an American reality television series, airing on Bravo in the United States. The season was primarily filmed in 2017. The season was announced by Bravo on August 22, 2017. The season premiered on October 4, 2017. The season finale aired on January 10, 2018, and a two-part reunion special in January 2018.

The season focuses on the lives of returning cast members Teresa Giudice, Melissa Gorga, Dolores Catania, Siggy Flicker and new cast member Margaret Josephs. Original cast member Danielle Staub returns to the series, appearing as a friend of the housewives.

This season marked the final appearance of Siggy Flicker.

== Production and crew ==
The Real Housewives of New Jersey was officially renewed for its eighth season on April 27, 2017. Amy Kohn, Luke Neslage, Rebecca Toth Diefenbach, Valerie Haselton, Lucilla D'Agostino, and Andy Cohen are recognized as the series' executive producers; it is produced and distributed by Sirens Media.

== Cast and synopsis ==
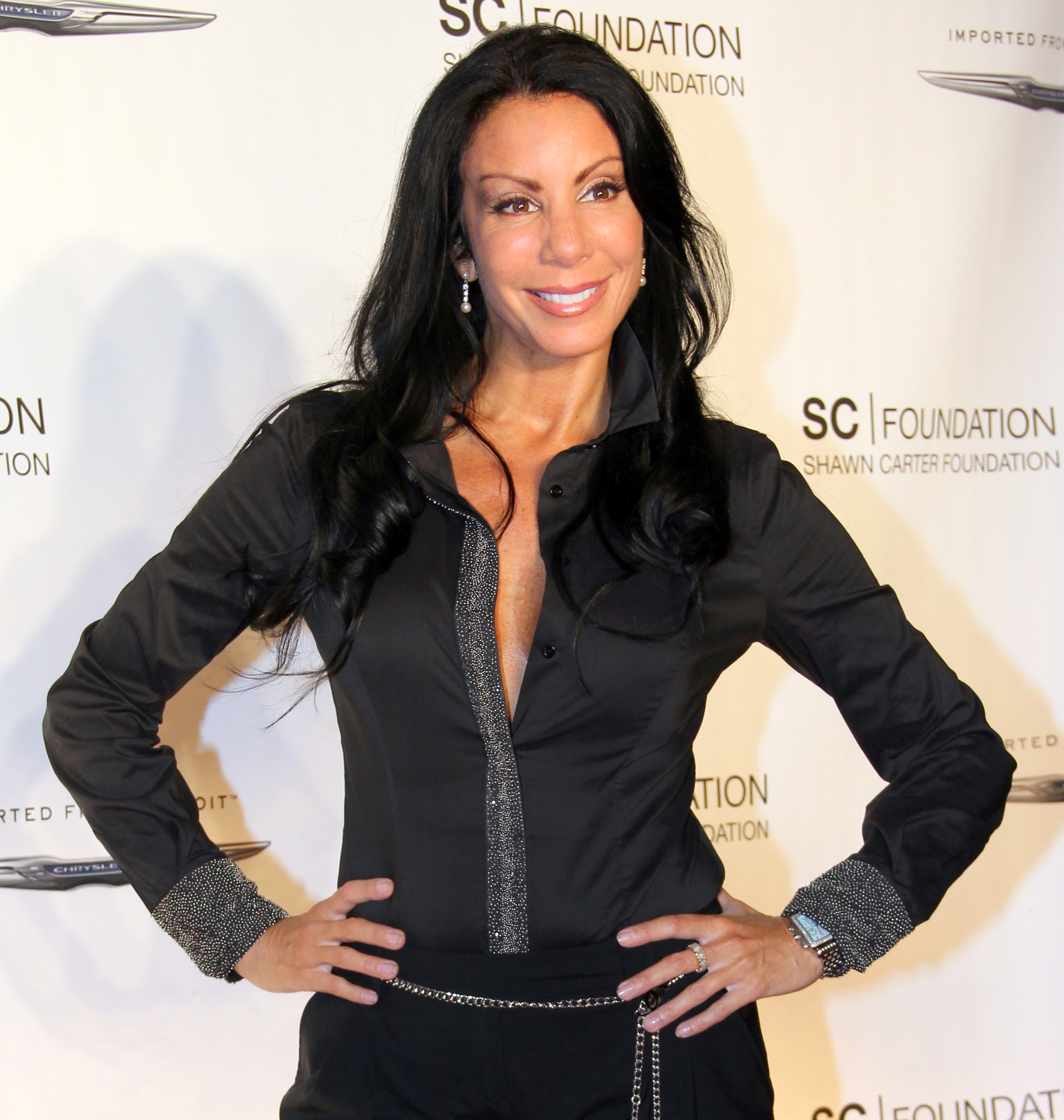
Danielle Staub appears in a recurring role.

In April 2017, Jacqueline Laurita announced she had departed the series. In May 2017, former housewife and recurring cast member Kathy Wakile also confirmed she would not be returning to the series. Teresa Giudice, Melissa Gorga, Dolores Catania, and Siggy Flicker returned for the season, while former housewife Danielle Staub returned in a "friend of" capacity. Former friend-of, DePaola also returns in a guest capacity. Laurita's departure made Giudice the only remaining original cast member as of season eight.

== Episodes ==
The Real Housewives of New Jersey season 8 episodes
No. overall	No. in season	Title	Original release date	U.S. viewers (millions)
133	1	"Shaddy Beach"	October 4, 2017	1.44
As Teresa struggles with the loss of her mom and the reality of being a single parent while her husband Joe is in prison, her friends plan a getaway to Boca Raton. She and her brother Joe Gorga go to their parents' house to collect some of their mother's belongings. Dolores' ex-husband Frank moves back in, and Siggy's career aspirations cause friction in her marriage. Siggy introduces Margaret Josephs to their group, but tensions flare when Danielle Staub makes her return.
134	2	"Let Them Eat Cake"	October 11, 2017	1.26
After an explosive fight on their trip, Siggy and Dolores have aligned themselves against Teresa and Melissa. As the girls grow closer to Margaret, the rift between Margaret and Siggy turns ugly. Dolores deals with the challenges of having her ex-husband and their son Frankie under the same roof for the first time in eighteen years. Joe Gorga tries to spend more time with his father, helping him deal with the loss of his wife.
135	3	"The Apology"	October 18, 2017	1.29
Margaret throws a launch party for her purse line, but Siggy and Dolores refuse to attend, causing Margaret to question how things got so bad with Siggy. Teresa begins to work on a book and Joe makes an important business decision without consulting Melissa. Frank and Dolores spar over the best way to handle Frankie.
136	4	"The Public Shaming of Melissa"	October 25, 2017	1.27
As the Gorgas' restaurant opening approaches, tension mounts between Melissa and Teresa as they are forced to work together professionally. Siggy throws a cocktail party, but her anger over the cake destroyed in Boca comes back to haunt Melissa. Danielle reveals a secret to Teresa that could potentially destroy Teresa's friendship with Dolores.
137	5	"Not Over It"	November 1, 2017	1.26
As Dolores begins to get serious with her new boyfriend, Siggy comes up with a plan for dealing with her empty nest syndrome. Margaret starts developing a shoe line while Teresa, Melissa, and Joe prepare for the Gorgas' tasting party. Melissa and Teresa get into a huge fight.
138	6	"Growing Up Jersey"	November 8, 2017	1.11
Teresa takes her daughters and her dad on vacation to Puerto Rico, but the fun quickly turns into family turmoil. Meanwhile, back in Jersey, Margaret and Dolores face off to confront their issues and Siggy tries to get control of her emotions by getting hormone therapy. Later, Melissa and Joe argue over how to parent Antonia.
139	7	"A Retreat to Remember"	November 15, 2017	1.20
As Teresa and Dolores try to repair their fragile friendship, Dolores drops a bomb on Teresa regarding Danielle. Later, Siggy hosts a Women's Empowerment Retreat that turns quickly into a Dolores vs. Danielle battleground. Meanwhile, Margaret and Melissa worry that they will feel the wrath of Siggy again.
140	8	"Walking on Broken Glass"	November 29, 2017	1.16
While at Siggy's retreat, the girls delve deep into their personal issues: Margaret opens up about her relationship with her step-kids and Teresa talks about her resentment towards Joe. Later, back in Jersey, Dolores plans a charity event and Teresa seeks advice from Siggy about her book. Meanwhile, Melissa and Margaret plan a fun surprise for all the ladies but tensions flare when Siggy and Dolores confront Teresa with a rumor they heard from Kim D.
141	9	"When Chairs Fly"	December 6, 2017	1.23
Tensions are running at an ultimate high as Teresa, Melissa, Margaret, and Danielle square off with Dolores, Siggy, and Kim D. at the annual Posche Fashion Show. When Teresa confronts Kim D. face-to-face about the cheating rumors, it leaves the group more divided than ever and questioning whether they should travel to Italy together.
142	10	"Meltdown in Milan"	December 13, 2017	1.22
The girls take a trip to Milan, Italy in the hopes of repairing their fractured friendships, but the tensions lead to a fight that may divide the group forever. Meanwhile, back in Jersey, Joe has a guys' night.
143	11	"Fauxpology"	December 20, 2017	1.16
Still in Milan, Margaret tries to mend her friendship with Siggy with a shocking result. Later, Margaret and Danielle go to a shoe factory to develop Margaret's shoe line. Meanwhile, with Siggy still unwilling to forgive Margaret, Teresa tries to talk some sense into her and Dolores and Melissa have a heart to heart. Later, back in Jersey, Joe checks in with the Giudice kids.
144	12	"Ain't No Misbehaving"	January 3, 2018	1.31
Teresa models in a photo shoot and Dolores takes her son on a college tour. The kitchen isn't the only thing heating up as the Gorgas prepare for their restaurant opening when Teresa and Melissa go head-to-head over a business decision. Danielle receives some closure she has been wanting.
145	13	"Prisons, Proposals and Parties"	January 10, 2018	1.26
Teresa visits her husband in prison with a plan to demand an apology. Dolores receives advice from her ex-husband about her boyfriend, while Danielle's boyfriend decides to take their relationship to the next level. Margaret celebrates her birthday and Siggy has a mishap that makes some of the women question her honesty. As the ladies reunite for one last time, unexpected alliances are formed.
146	14	"Reunion Part 1"	January 17, 2018	1.39
The ladies of Jersey come back together to hash out their differences, relive their funniest moments and reflect on the loss of Teresa's mom. But the biggest surprises comes when Kim D arrives on set, forcing the ladies to take sides and pushing Teresa to her limit.
147	15	"Reunion Part 2"	January 24, 2018	1.30
Teresa accuses Kim D of being a Madame, Danielle and Dolores' face off, and the whole cast revisits their epic trip to Italy where one comment about Hitler changed the nature of their friendships forever.
148	16	"Reunion Secrets Revealed"	January 31, 2018	0.97
Check out funny and surprising never-before-seen moments from the ladies of the Garden State: a Gorga/Giudice Easter celebration gets completely out of control, Margaret and Siggy show surprising BFF potential at a photo shoot, Danielle crosses the line in the Gorgas restaurant bathroom, Gia reveals her true feelings about her dad returning home, and more.
