= The Real Housewives of New Jersey season 12 =

The Real Housewives of New Jersey
- Season 12
- Left to right: Josephs, Goldschneider, Gorga, Giudice, Catania and Aydin
- Starring: Teresa Giudice; Melissa Gorga; Dolores Catania; Margaret Josephs; Jennifer Aydin; Jackie Goldschneider
- No. of episodes: 16

Release
- Original network: Bravo
- Original release: February 1 – May 17, 2022

Season chronology
- ← Previous; Season 11 Next → Season 13

The twelfth season of The Real Housewives of New Jersey, an American reality television series, was broadcast on Bravo from February 1, 2022. Its executive producers were Jordana Hochman, Amy Kohn, Lauren Volonakis, Eric Fuller, Taylor Lucy Choi, and Andy Cohen. The season focused on the lives of returning cast members Teresa Giudice, Melissa Gorga, Dolores Catania, Margaret Josephs, Jennifer Aydin and Jackie Goldschneider. Traci Johnson joined the cast as a Friend of the Housewives.

The season marked the final regular appearance of Jackie Goldschneider.

== Production and crew ==
Production started filming for the 12th season in May of 2021 and wrapped in early August. The original premiere date was supposed to be in December, however was delayed to February 1, 2022. The trailer and cast photo were released on December 21, 2021.

== Cast ==
All housewives returned from Season 11.

== Episodes ==
The Real Housewives of New Jersey season 12 episodes
No. overall	No. in season	Title	Original release date	U.S. viewers (millions)
201	1	"Smoke, Mirrors and Foggy Diamonds"	February 1, 2022	1.10
202	2	"House of Hypocrisy"	February 8, 2022	0.89
203	3	"A Very Jersey Kegger"	February 15, 2022	1.04
204	4	"Shady Down the Shore"	February 22, 2022	0.98
205	5	"Jersey Shore Showdown"	March 1, 2022	1.01
206	6	"Bromance Breakup"	March 8, 2022	0.96
207	7	"Allegation Aggravation"	March 15, 2022	1.04
208	8	"Forest of Fury"	March 22, 2022	1.00
209	9	"There's No Crying in Softball"	March 29, 2022	0.98
210	10	"The Horny Hungarians"	April 5, 2022	1.11
211	11	"Nightmare in Nashvegas"	April 12, 2022	0.98
212	12	"Lady Drama Mamas"	April 19, 2022	1.11
213	13	"Showdown in Smashville"	April 26, 2022	1.17
214	14	"Reunion Part 1"	May 3, 2022	1.12
215	15	"Reunion Part 2"	May 10, 2022	1.13
216	16	"Reunion Part 3"	May 17, 2022	1.09
