= The Real Housewives of New Jersey season 11 =

The Real Housewives of New Jersey
- Season 11
- Starring: Teresa Giudice; Melissa Gorga; Dolores Catania; Margaret Josephs; Jennifer Aydin; Jackie Goldschneider
- No. of episodes: 15

Release
- Original network: Bravo
- Original release: February 17 – May 26, 2021

Season chronology
- ← Previous; Season 10 Next → Season 12

The eleventh season of The Real Housewives of New Jersey, an American reality television series, was broadcast on Bravo from February 17, 2021. It is primarily filmed in New Jersey; its executive producers are Amy Kohn, Jessica Sebastian, Jordana Hochman, Lauren Volonakis, and Andy Cohen.

The Real Housewives of New Jersey focuses on the lives of returning cast members Teresa Giudice, Melissa Gorga, Dolores Catania, Margaret Josephs, Jennifer Aydin and Jackie Goldschneider.

== Production and crew ==
Amy Kohn, Jessica Sebastian, Jordana Hochman, Lauren Volonakis, and Andy Cohen are recognized as the series' executive producers; it is produced and distributed by Sirens Media.

Production on the series was set to begin in March 2020, but was delayed due to the COVID-19 pandemic. Production began in July 2020 and wrapped in October 2020.

== Cast and synopsis ==
In January 2020, former fulltime housewife and recurring cast member Danielle Staub announced she would be departing the series for the second time. Giudice, Gorga, Catania, Josephs, Aydin and Goldschneider returned. In addition to this, Michelle Pais, through her connection with Giudice, makes regular guest appearances throughout the season.

== Episodes ==
The Real Housewives of New Jersey season 11 episodes
No. overall	No. in season	Title	Original release date	U.S. viewers (millions)
186	1	"C U Next Tuesday?"	February 17, 2021	1.13
187	2	"Licked Up and Down"	February 24, 2021	1.09
188	3	"Guys Gone Wild"	March 3, 2021	1.09
189	4	"Redo and Rewind"	March 10, 2021	1.03
190	5	"Kiss My Peach"	March 17, 2021	1.00
191	6	"Dildos Down the Shore"	March 24, 2021	1.03
192	7	"Old Feuds Never Die"	March 31, 2021	1.11
193	8	"Memorial Mayhem"	April 7, 2021	1.01
194	9	"Pineapple Puss"	April 14, 2021	1.05
195	10	"Sinking Ships"	April 21, 2021	0.97
196	11	"Teresa in Love"	April 28, 2021	1.02
197	12	"Teresa's Mystery Man"	May 5, 2021	1.06
198	13	"House of Horrors"	May 12, 2021	1.01
199	14	"Reunion Part 1"	May 19, 2021	1.08
200	15	"Reunion Part 2"	May 26, 2021	N/A
