= Josephs =

Josephs is an English surname, and may refer to

- Janielle Josephs (born 2000), Jamaican athlete
- Joshua Josephs (born 2003), American football player
- Margaret Josephs (born 1947), American former reality television personality
- Michael Josephs (1763–1849), English lexicographer and Hebraist
- Moeneeb Josephs (born 1980), South African footballer
- Robert Josephs (born 1961), American Professor of Psychology
- Wilfred Josephs (1927–1997), English composer

== See also ==
- Joseph (surname)
- Josephson
