= The Real Housewives of New Jersey season 13 =

The Real Housewives of New Jersey
- Season 13
- Left to right: Fuda, Josephs, Gorga, Catania, Giudice, Aydin and Cabral
- Starring: Teresa Giudice; Melissa Gorga; Dolores Catania; Margaret Josephs; Jennifer Aydin; Danielle Cabral; Rachel Fuda
- No. of episodes: 19

Release
- Original network: Bravo
- Original release: February 7 – June 13, 2023

Season chronology
- ← Previous; Season 12 Next → Season 14

The thirteenth season of The Real Housewives of New Jersey, an American reality television series, was broadcast on Bravo from February 7, 2023. It is primarily filmed in New Jersey; its executive producers are Jordana Hochman, Sarah Howell, Mioshi Hill, Lauren Volonakis, Maggie Langtry, Lisa Levey and Andy Cohen.

The Real Housewives of New Jersey focuses on the lives of returning cast members Teresa Giudice, Melissa Gorga, Dolores Catania, Margaret Josephs and Jennifer Aydin. Danielle Cabral and Rachel Fuda join the cast, with Jennifer Fessler joining the cast as a Friend of the Housewives along with former full time Housewife Jackie Goldschneider.

== Production and crew ==
Jordana Hochman, Sarah Howell, Mioshi Hill, Lauren Volonakis, Maggie Langtry, Lisa Levey and Andy Cohen are recognized as the series' executive producers; it is produced and distributed by Sirens Media.

== Cast and synopsis ==
Giudice, Gorga, Catania, Josephs and Aydin returned, with Goldschneider returning in a recurring capacity. Danielle Cabral and Rachel Fuda join the cast, with Jennifer Fessler joining as a Friend of the Housewives. Upon the casting announcement, Goldschneider told People that she had initially been offered a full-time contract, however, due to her personal struggles with her eating disorder, she declined and was instead demoted to a recurring "friend" role.

== Episodes ==
The Real Housewives of New Jersey season 13 episodes
No. overall	No. in season	Title	Original release date	U.S. viewers (millions)
217	1	"New Friends, Same Jersey"	February 7, 2023	0.85
218	2	"Family, Family, Family"	February 14, 2023	0.86
219	3	"Boys Will Be Boys"	February 21, 2023	0.87
220	4	"Housewarming History Lesson"	February 28, 2023	0.87
221	5	"Driving Miss Crazy"	March 7, 2023	0.79
222	6	"All Bats Are Off"	March 14, 2023	0.82
223	7	"Shots and Shade"	March 21, 2023	0.87
224	8	"Pizza Gate"	March 28, 2023	0.94
225	9	"Coffee Talk"	April 4, 2023	0.85
226	10	"The Italian Invasion"	April 11, 2023	0.90
227	11	"I Smell a Rat"	April 18, 2023	0.77
228	12	"Sláinte!"	April 25, 2023	0.97
229	13	"Messes & Bridesmaid Dresses"	May 2, 2023	0.83
230	14	"Rat in the Street"	May 9, 2023	0.82
231	15	"Flappers of Fury"	May 16, 2023	1.02
232	16	"Teresa Gets Married"	May 23, 2023	0.98
233	17	"Reunion Part 1"	May 30, 2023	1.18
234	18	"Reunion Part 2"	June 6, 2023	1.19
235	19	"Reunion Part 3"	June 13, 2023	1.25
