= The Real Housewives of New Jersey season 7 =

Seventh season of the reality television series The Real Housewives of New Jersey

The Real Housewives of New Jersey
- Season 7
- Cover used by the iTunes Store (Left to right) Flicker, Laurita, Giudice, Gorga, and Catania
- Starring: Teresa Giudice; Jacqueline Laurita; Melissa Gorga; Dolores Catania; Siggy Flicker
- No. of episodes: 18

Release
- Original network: Bravo
- Original release: July 10 – November 13, 2016

Season chronology
- ← Previous; Season 6 Next → Season 8

The seventh season of The Real Housewives of New Jersey, an American reality television series, premiered on July 10, 2016, and is broadcast on Bravo. It is primarily filmed in North Jersey; its executive producers are Rebecca Toth Diefenbach, Valerie Haselton, Lucilla D'Agostino, Jim Fraenkel, Omid Kahangi, Caroline Self, and Andy Cohen.

The Real Housewives of New Jersey focuses on the lives of returning cast members Teresa Giudice, Melissa Gorga, and Jacqueline Laurita; Laurita returned after leaving the series during season 6. Former cast members Kathy Wakile, Rosie Pierri, Nicole Napolitano and Teresa Aprea appeared periodically throughout the season. Former housewives, Aprea, Napolitano and Marchese were replaced by new cast members Dolores Catania and Siggy Flicker.

This season marked the final appearance of Jacqueline Laurita.

== Production and crew ==
The Real Housewives of New Jersey was officially renewed for its seventh season on February 8, 2016. Rebecca Toth Diefenbach, Valerie Haselton, Lucilla D'Agostino, Jim Fraenkel, Omid Kahangi, Caroline Self, Andy Cohen and Tess Gamboa Meyers are recognized as the series' executive producers; it is produced and distributed by Sirens Media.

== Cast and synopsis ==
The seventh season was announced in May, after having a nearly 2-year hiatus. Dina Manzo, who had previously returned for Season 6 after a three-season hiatus did not film this season due to geographic reasons, as she no longer lives in the Garden State. One season stars Amber Marchese and twins Nicole and Teresa made their departures as well, however made a guest appearance, making Teresa Giudice and Melissa Gorga the only full-time cast members to return from Season 6. Jacqueline Laurita, who departed from the show after the fifth season, returned. Siggy Flicker and Dolores Catania joined the cast for the seventh season. Kathy Wakile and Rosie Pierri featured as friends of the housewives. Robyn Levy, Christina Flores and Kim DePaola also made guest appearances.

This season focuses on the return of Teresa Giudice from her eleven-month prison sentence as she slowly readjusts to life as a free woman, and back to being the wife and mother she always was. It also focuses on her attempts to repair fractured relationships with the Gorgas and Jacqueline.

== Episodes ==
The Real Housewives of New Jersey season 7 episodes
No. overall	No. in season	Title	Original release date	U.S. viewers (millions)
115	1	"Jingle Bells and Prison Cells"	July 10, 2016	1.74
Melissa goes against her husband's wishes by taking the first steps to opening her own boutique. Two new housewives, Siggy Flicker and Dolores Catania, are introduced through catching up with Jacqueline. Jacqueline hosts a cocktail party where she receives an unexpected message from Teresa. Teresa returns home from prison just in time to spend Christmas with her family.
116	2	"A Very Hairy Christmas"	July 17, 2016	1.63
Melissa and Teresa reunite at Melissa's Christmas Eve dinner. Dolores attempts to help mend Teresa and Jacqueline's friendship, leaving Jacqueline surprised when she receives a phone call.
117	3	"Leopard Is the New Black"	July 24, 2016	1.55
Teresa is surprised when Jacqueline arrives at her door, and she wants answers. Melissa has issues with her new business partner Jackie. Siggy hosts a birthday party for Dolores.
118	4	"A Life to Envy"	July 31, 2016	1.54
It's all business in Jersey as Melissa opens her boutique, Teresa records her audiobook for her memoir, Turning the Tables and Jacqueline takes steps on a business venture of her own. Dolores discusses veterinary school with her daughter. Later, drama arises between Siggy and Teresa as they discuss tabloids and gossip.
119	5	"Dinner Interrupted"	August 14, 2016	0.86
Jacqueline and Teresa's newly repaired friendship is derailed when old tensions resurface during a dinner hosted by Jacqueline. Meanwhile, Siggy is shocked when her kids confront her with some news; Melissa is proud when her kids walk in Fashion Week; and Dolores endeavors towards independence. Melissa and Teresa continue to grow closer.
120	6	"Swimming with the Gefilte Fishes"	August 21, 2016	1.38
The ladies plan a trip in celebration of Teresa's ankle monitor being removed. Siggy takes some steps in reconnecting with her Jewish faith, while Dolores continues with her home renovation. Later, Melissa confronts Jacqueline on her dispute with Teresa.
121	7	"Spa-Cation"	August 28, 2016	1.35
The wives head to a spa. Jacqueline struggles with her son and reaches a breaking point, while Dolores struggles with the impending loss of her sick 12-year-old dog. Siggy opens up about her husband's past and Melissa continues to deal with the responsibilities of her new business. Teresa and Jacqueline reach a point where they must decide whether they move forward as friends or foes. * Note: not counting reunions or specials this is the 100th episode in the series
122	8	"All Bets Are Off"	September 5, 2016	1.59
Melissa and her business partner Jackie have a disagreement, leading Melissa to spend more time at home with her family. Siggy comforts Dolores after Dolores' dog, Boo, passes away. Rosie Pierri seeks to repair the relationship with Joe Giudice, her cousin-in-law. Teresa hosts a launch party for Turning the Tables. She and Gia spend mother-daughter time together. Tensions rise as Joe Giudice's prison sentence draws closer.
123	9	"Driving Miss Siggy"	September 11, 2016	1.58
Joe and Melissa reach an impasse when Joe is frustrated about Melissa's working, so Melissa hosts a dinner with her family. Teresa and her daughters visit Jacqueline and Nicholas. Siggy's son Joshua celebrates his 17th birthday. Rosie Pierri and Kathy Wakile want to make peace with their cousin Teresa. Dolores returns to work at her gym.
124	10	"Cut The Cancer Out"	September 18, 2016	1.52
Emotions soar in New Jersey when Jacqueline chokes up over a special proposal and Teresa fumes during a strained family reunion. In addition, Dolores focuses on her gym business, and Melissa suggests a group getaway to Vermont.
125	11	"Rage On My Ass"	September 25, 2016	1.71
The group drives to a mountaintop resort in Vermont; Jacqueline and Teresa's friend, Robyn, get into a scuffle in the van; Dolores and Siggy struggle to keep the peace; Jacqueline and Robyn get into a fiery argument at the bonfire.
126	12	"The Other C Word"	October 2, 2016	1.80
In Vermont, Siggy and Dolores comfort Jacqueline after her fight with Robyn. Teresa and Melissa don't understand why Jacqueline is playing the victim, prompting Jacqueline to lose her cool and say things she'll never be able to take back.
127	13	"Picking Sides"	October 9, 2016	1.37
The women continue to lick their wounds following the tumultuous Vermont trip. Melissa gets bad news about her boutique and Jacqueline's husband Chris shares shocking news about his family. Teresa leans on her faith as her husband heads to prison.
128	14	"The Importance of Being Family"	October 16, 2016	1.73
Teresa struggles to stay strong as her husband Joe begins his 41-month prison sentence; Siggy visits the Holocaust Memorial and recounts her father's journey to freedom; Dolores shops for her housewarming party.
129	15	"Nama'Stay Away From Me"	October 23, 2016	1.69
The women clash at Dolores's house-warming party and Melissa prepares for her upcoming fashion show. Siggy attempts to go the extra mile for her mother while Jacqueline and Dolores find themselves feuding over a frosty phone call.
130	16	"And Then There Were Four"	October 30, 2016	1.67
Melissa hosts her first ever Envy fashion show in an attempt to prove that her boutique is legitimate. Dolores decides to surprise her ex-husband and Teresa begins to consider her future from a financial point of view. The women meet for lunch where Siggy acts as the mediator but conflict with both Teresa and Melissa ultimately leads to Jacqueline fleeing the scene.
131	17	"Reunion Part One"	November 6, 2016	1.91
The women relive the wildest moments from a roller-coaster season; Melissa and Teresa come face to face with Jacqueline for the first time since the meltdown; Siggy shares information about her hysterectomy; Teresa levels a shocking accusation.
132	18	"Reunion Part Two"	November 13, 2016	1.94
Joe Gorga and Chris Laurita join the women to discuss Teresa's allegation; Dolores strives to keep the group from unraveling; Jacqueline writes off a relationship; Siggy makes a wish for the group that comes true.
