= The Real Housewives of New Jersey season 14 =

The Real Housewives of New Jersey
- Season 14
- Promotional poster via Peacock
- Starring: Teresa Giudice; Melissa Gorga; Dolores Catania; Margaret Josephs; Jennifer Aydin; Danielle Cabral; Rachel Fuda
- No. of episodes: 14

Release
- Original network: Bravo
- Original release: May 5 – August 11, 2024

Season chronology
- ← Previous; Season 13

The fourteenth season of The Real Housewives of New Jersey, an American reality television series, was broadcast on Bravo from May 5, 2024. It was primarily filmed in New Jersey; its executive producers are Jordana Hochman, Sarah Howell, Mioshi Hill, Lauren Volonakis, Maggie Langtry and Andy Cohen.

The Real Housewives of New Jersey focuses on the lives of returning cast members Teresa Giudice, Melissa Gorga, Dolores Catania, Margaret Josephs, Jennifer Aydin, Danielle Cabral and Rachel Fuda, with Jackie Goldschneider and Jennifer Fessler serving as Friends of the Housewives.

This season marked the final appearances of Margaret Josephs, Jennifer Aydin, Danielle Cabral, and Rachel Fuda.

== Production and crew ==
Filming for the fourteenth season began in August 2023 and concluded in October 2023. Jordana Hochman, Sarah Howell, Mioshi Hill, Lauren Volonakis, Maggie Langtry and Andy Cohen are recognized as the series' executive producers; it is produced and distributed by Sirens Media.

In September 2023, Jennifer Aydin and Danielle Cabral were temporarily suspended from filming due to a physical altercation.

On June 1, 2024, People Magazine reported that the cast would not film a traditional reunion, as production felt the cast was incapable of having a civilized discussion.

== Cast and synopsis ==
The entire cast from the thirteenth season returned.

== Episodes ==
The Real Housewives of New Jersey season 14 episodes
No. overall	No. in season	Title	Original release date	U.S. viewers (millions)
236	1	"Birthday Bombshell"	May 5, 2024	0.84
237	2	"The Icing on the Brain Cake"	May 12, 2024	0.74
238	3	"Shore-ing Up Sides"	May 19, 2024	0.70
239	4	"A League of Their Own Worst Enemy"	May 26, 2024	0.62
240	5	"Glitz & Blitz"	June 2, 2024	0.75
241	6	"Margs & Marriage"	June 9, 2024	0.70
242	7	"Gifts & Receipts"	June 16, 2024	0.67
243	8	"Trouble in Tulum"	June 23, 2024	0.79
244	9	"Behind Frenemy Lines"	June 30, 2024	0.79
245	10	"Inner Piece of My Mind"	July 14, 2024	0.76
246	11	"Sleepover With One Eye Open"	July 21, 2024	0.72
247	12	"Don't Trial This at Home"	July 28, 2024	0.59
248	13	"When All Is Said and Done"	August 4, 2024	0.87
249	14	"Off the Rails"	August 11, 2024	0.71
