= The Real Housewives of New Jersey season 2 =

Season of television series

The Real Housewives of New Jersey
- Season 2
- Cover used by the iTunes Store (Left to right) Staub, Giudice, Laurita, Caroline, and Dina Manzo
- Starring: Dina Manzo; Teresa Giudice; Jacqueline Laurita; Caroline Manzo; Danielle Staub
- No. of episodes: 18

Release
- Original network: Bravo
- Original release: May 3 – September 6, 2010

Season chronology
- ← Previous; Season 1 Next → Season 3

The second season of The Real Housewives of New Jersey, an American reality television series, was broadcast on Bravo. It aired from May 3, 2010, until September 6, 2010, and was primarily filmed in Franklin Lakes, New Jersey. Its executive producers are Rebecca Toth Diefenbach, Valerie Haselton, Lucilla D'Agostino, Jim Fraenkel, Omid Kahangi, Caroline Self, Tess Gamboa Meyers and Andy Cohen.

The Real Housewives of New Jersey focuses on the lives of Dina Manzo, Teresa Giudice, Jacqueline Laurita, Caroline Manzo and Danielle Staub. It consisted of eighteen episodes.

This season marked the final regular appearance of Danielle Staub. It also marked the first departure of Dina Manzo. She eventually returned for the show's 6th season.

== Production and crew ==
With the success of the first season averaging 2.55 million total viewers, Bravo announced the renewal of the second season on October 6, 2009. The season premiere "Water Under the Table" was aired on May 10, 2010, while the sixteenth episode "The Heads of Family Will Roll" served as the season finale, and was aired on August 23, 2010. It was followed by a two-part reunion which marked the conclusion of the season and was broadcast on August 30 and September 6, 2010. Rebecca Toth Diefenbach, Valerie Haselton, Lucilla D'Agostino, Jim Fraenkel, Omid Kahangi, Caroline Self, Tess Gamboa Meyers and Andy Cohen are recognized as the series' executive producers; it is produced and distributed by Sirens Media.

== Cast and synopsis ==
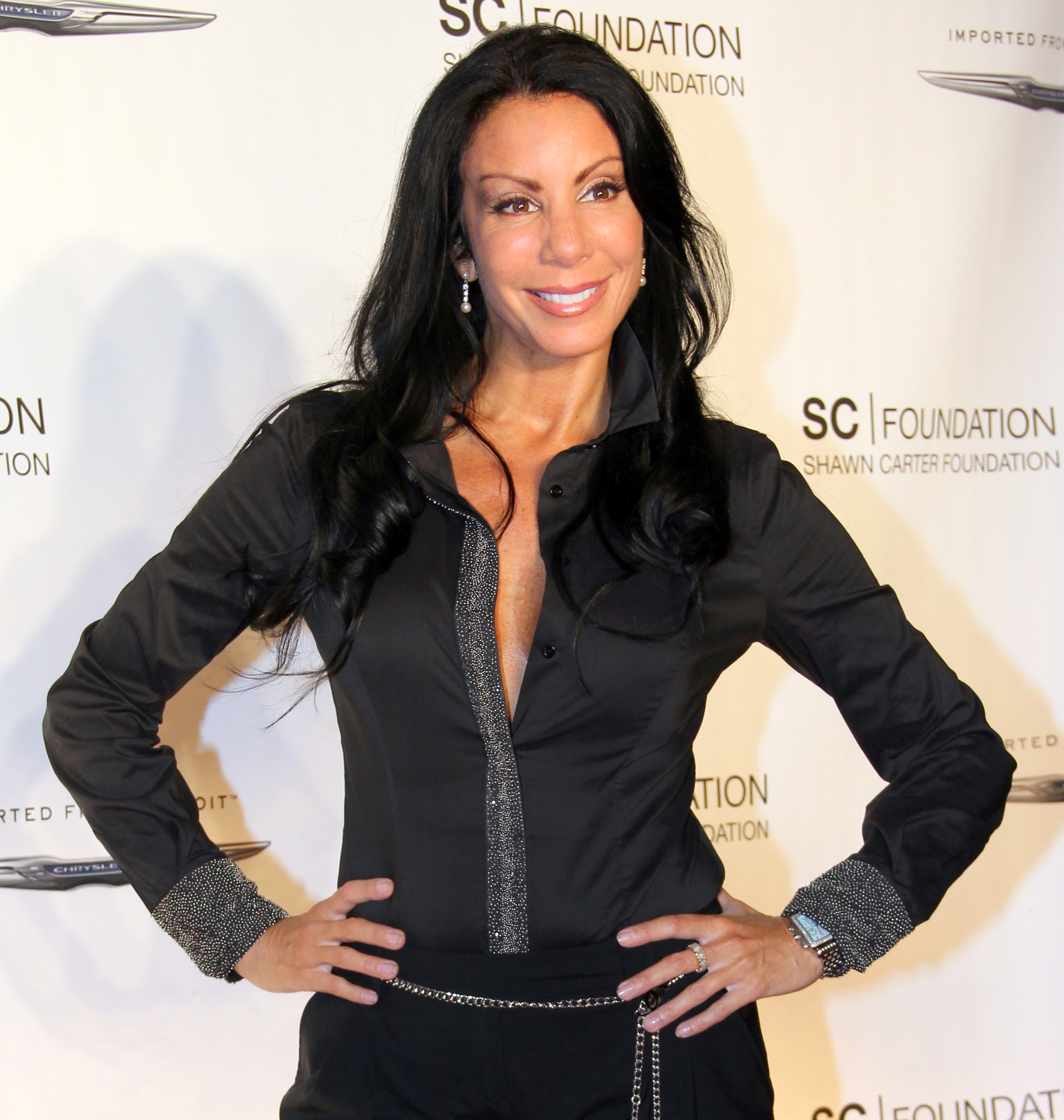
Danielle Staub appears in a lead role.

The second season saw no regular cast changes made at the beginning of the series. The season begins where the first ended- Danielle being on the outs with the other ladies and still trying to intercept the inner-circle. Throughout the series, the cast continues to fight with Danielle and continue to unite with one another as friends and family. In episode 7, "Play at Your Own Risk", it saw Dina Manzo departing from the series to get rid of Danielle and spend more time with her family.

== Episodes ==
The Real Housewives of New Jersey season 2 episodes
| No. overall | No. in season | Title | Original release date | U.S. viewers (millions) |
|---|---|---|---|---|
| 11 | 1 | "Water Under the Table" | May 3, 2010 | 2.33 |
In the Season 2 premiere, Teresa gets her girls ready for their first day of school, Jacqueline has a baby boy, and Caroline throws a bash for the local Sheriff. Jacqueline's husband tells her he would prefer she not see Danielle again and that he doesn't want her in their house. When Danielle hears of the party, she insists it means nothing to her but starts out on a drive-by of Caroline's house. Her daughters make her abandon the drive-by.
| 12 | 2 | "Generation Vexed" | May 10, 2010 | 2.00 |
Jacqueline and her daughter Ashley discuss Ashley's bad girl behavior. Caroline and Teresa question Jacqueline's continued association with Danielle. When Lauren starts dating Albie's best friend Vito, it causes friction in the Manzo clan, but Caroline does her best to let her babies work it out themselves. Danielle's daughter Christine gets featured on the cover of Daily, and she and Teresa's daughter Gia are invited to walk the runway during New York Fashion Week. Danielle arranges a luncheon of her close friends to celebrate Christine's success, and she invites Dina and Jacqueline. Although they both apparently declined her invitation ahead of time, during the luncheon Danielle draws her guests' attention to Jacqueline and Dina's absence.
| 13 | 3 | "Catty-Walk" | May 17, 2010 | 2.03 |
The drama continues when Danielle accuses Jacqueline of not being her own woman, further alienating Jacqueline. Dina is tired of the negativity and sees a Zen expert to purge Danielle from her life. Meanwhile, a pregnant Teresa and a determined Danielle see their daughters model in Fashion Week, but mishaps unfold on the runway and both daughters’ fashion careers are in doubt.
| 14 | 4 | "Babies, Bubbles and Bubbies" | May 24, 2010 | 2.16 |
Teresa and Joe welcome their fourth bambina and Teresa asks Dina to be the baby's godmother. Chris Manzo gets an inside look at his dream business, and Jacqueline gets a look inside her husband's safe. Jacqueline will have no more to do with Danielle. The Brownstone prepares for a charity event, but the Manzo-Laurita family don't know that a friend has asked Danielle to present the check. Danielle prepares by arranging for an ex-convict friend to accompany her as "back-up." Caroline is aghast when she hears Danielle will attend.
| 15 | 5 | "Into the Lion's Den" | May 31, 2010 | N/A |
Teresa and Joe bring the new baby home from the hospital. Jacqueline meets Ashley's boyfriend's mother, while Caroline's son and daughter go to dinner with the couple. Danielle arrives at the Brownstone charity event with Kim G., and an entourage including a Hell's Angel. As she was not invited to bring so many people, no table space is available and the event organizers (not the Manzos) ask that she and her entourage leave. Danielle claims that the Manzos penalized the young girl whose medical treatment was the object of the event and hints that the Manzos made a "big mistake" in offending her entourage, even though she was not supposed to bring them.
| 16 | 6 | "It's Not Me, It's You" | June 7, 2010 | 2.43 |
After the Brownstone event, Danielle gets what she says is a threatening text from Jacqueline's daughter Ashley, and ponders legal action. Teresa's daughter Gia fails a film audition and starts dialect coaching for a Jersey accent. Kim G. criticizes Danielle's choice of "escorts" to the charity event, and with Jacqueline at a beauty shop, Kim vents frustration at Danielle's behavior. At a family dinner, the Manzo-Lauritas and Giudices toast getting Danielle out of their lives. Dina asks to meet Danielle to discuss their relationship; Danielle fears an "ambush" and has her ex-con on hand. The discussion gets off to a bad start.
| 17 | 7 | "Play at Your Own Risk" | June 14, 2010 | 2.74 |
Dina and Danielle's meeting ends in argument. Danielle and friends including Kim G. mock a text Dina sent Danielle. Kim asks Jacqueline about Ashley and Danielle's Facebook war. The Manzos go pumpkin-picking with the Giudices, Ashley and her boyfriend, who is asked to a family poker game where the men will "initiate" him. At the game Jacqueline tells Danielle's ex, Steve, that she objects to his sale of Danielle's sex tape. Steve explains that the tape is of Danielle alone, and that she herself dropped legal action to stop the sale. Derek holds up well, but a fight between Jacqueline and Ashley interrupts the game. Danielle and friends go for a pole-dancing lesson so she can feel sexy when dating. Dina decides to leave the series to get rid of Danielle and spend more time with her family.
| 18 | 8 | "Bubbies Gone Bad" | June 21, 2010 | 2.84 |
Teresa, Caroline and Jacqueline have lunch and regret Dina's absence. Caroline's daughter Lauren finishes beauty school, but Caroline's son Albie may not be able to continue his legal studies. Ashley considers moving home but is daunted by her stepfather Chris' anger at her fight with Jacqueline at the poker game, and by the rules he imposes if she wants to live at home again. Danielle has surgery to correct her third breast implant operation. Teresa and Joe's housewarming party is disrupted when Kim G. discusses Danielle though the Manzo-Laurita women don't want to talk about her. Note: Dina Manzo alongside Melissa and Joe Gorga are briefly seen at Teresa's housewarming party.
| 19 | 9 | "Posche Spite" | June 28, 2010 | 2.71 |
Caroline discusses Albie with her sisters. Kim D. asks Teresa and Jacqueline to a Posche fashion show Danielle may attend. Danielle hears that Kim D. asked them, claims the Posche desk clerk insulted her and won't shop there again. Caroline wants her husband to retire but he offers only to reduce his hours. Danielle arrives late for the show with Kim G. and a bodyguard. Kim D. sits with Teresa and Jacqueline at the show, so Danielle insists Kim set up the show to insult her. After the show, Teresa tries to talk with Danielle. Kim G. tries to keep everyone calm but Danielle responds badly to Teresa.
| 20 | 10 | "Country Clubbed" | July 12, 2010 | 3.28 |
Teresa and Danielle's exchange ends in a wild chase through the country club. Ashley pulls out some of Danielle's extensions. Danielle calls the police. Ashley makes a Facebook comment on the incident. Jacqueline and Chris warn Ashley that another incident will get her thrown out of the house. Danielle's energist calls Jacqueline to remove negative energies, with doubtful results. Danielle mulls legal action against Ashley. Albie's lawyer gives him hopeful news about law school.
| 21 | 11 | "Staub Wounds" | July 19, 2010 | 2.74 |
Danielle presses charges against Ashley, and takes boxing instruction to protect herself. Caroline and Jacqueline feel Danielle is going after one of their children just because they rejected her friendship. Kim "G." is with Danielle at the courthouse and promises to support her in court, but then visits Jacqueline, who says it's wrong to play both sides as Kim appears to be doing. Albie can continue his law studies, but may have to attend an out-of-state school.
| 22 | 12 | "Youth Will Be Served" | July 26, 2010 | 2.58 |
Teresa and Joe celebrate their tenth wedding anniversary in true Giudice style, despite money woes Joe admits to Chris. Joe's new business gets help from some very hands-on customers and his little princesses learn a tough lesson in the process. Ashley gets a summons to answer Danielle's complaint against her and intends to countersue Danielle, but Jacqueline and Chris think not. Danielle focuses on Christine's sweet 16, which is a success. While his law school applications are pending, Albie enters the police academy.
| 23 | 13 | "Don't Drink the Holy Water" | August 2, 2010 | 2.64 |
Dina Manzo returns as Audriana Giudice is christened in a typical Giudice festival. Chris Manzo has his 1 year anniversary as a Brownstone worker. Danielle confides to Kim G. that she wants to find her birth mother, and Danielle takes her daughter Christine for a first adult doctor's visit. A chance remark by Christine tips off Danielle that Kim G. is friendly with the Manzo-Lauritas and Teresa, even to the point of revealing to Teresa what was told to her in confidence. Danielle tells another friend to avoid Kim. On hearing this, Kim apologizes to Jacqueline for ignoring her advice about Danielle. Danielle asks Kim G. to a restaurant meeting and after a furious public dispute, the two part ways. Note: Dina Manzo makes an appearance; Melissa Gorga and Kathy Wakile are shown briefly sitting at a table at Audriana's christening.
| 24 | 14 | "The Chanels of Venice" | August 9, 2010 | 3.08 |
Joe Giudice has a one-car accident and is charged with DUI (to Danielle's delight). Teresa, Caroline and Jacqueline and extended families fly to Venice, where Teresa manages to find a chance to spend. On their cruise ship for Naples the generational mix is complicated, and even Caroline and Albert become babysitters for the young Giudices, who are not entirely cooperative. Jacqueline overindulges the first night out and misses Milania Giudice's fourth birthday party, at which Milania falls asleep at dinner and wakes up cranky, refusing her birthday cake.
| 25 | 15 | "Hills Are Alive With Giudice" | August 16, 2010 | 2.58 |
The Manzos, Lauritas and Giudices arrive in Naples and are on their way to visit the Giudice family outside of town. Joe quickly loses his temper with Teresa about all the things she brought and all the things she wants to buy while in Italy. Caroline and Albert get tired easily due to all the walking in the village where the Giudices live, especially involving the numerous steep steps. Teresa gets to see the apartment where Joe was born from the street below. The final reunion dinner Teresa planned goes off without a hitch. Finally, everyone returns home, happy from the trip but sad that they will have to deal with Danielle soon enough.
| 26 | 16 | "The Heads of Family Will Roll" | August 23, 2010 | 3.36 |
At a family dinner, Caroline announces that she will try to save Ashley from criminal charges and try to mediate directly with Danielle. Danielle is surprised to see Caroline has her phone number and is skeptical of the idea, but agrees to meet her. The meeting starts off quietly, but deteriorates when Danielle says that she will not drop the charges and that Ashley should pay for her mistake. Things get worse when Danielle lists the times she feels Caroline's family wronged her. Caroline asks what she has done to Danielle; when Danielle cannot name a reason, she reverses the question with Caroline stating that her entire family is an extension of her and therefore Danielle wounded Caroline. Danielle leaves when Caroline says, "When I said you were garbage, I meant that you were garbage." Both women tell their families that the fight between them is over.
| 27 | 17 | "Reunion: Part 1"^{†} | August 30, 2010 | 3.85 |
The women meet for the first time in over a year at the Borgata Hotel and Casino in Atlantic City. Tempers soon explode over a dispute regarding Ashley. When Danielle makes a remark about Teresa's nephew, Teresa bolts from her couch and yells at Danielle not to bring up her family. Danielle walks off-set, further angering Teresa; Caroline chastises her for "giving [Danielle] what she wanted." The "ominous thing" from last season's reunion regarding Dina is revealed; Danielle allegedly tried to have Child Protective Services take Dina's daughter Lexi. Danielle smugly makes a comment about "having her lawyers" put a gag order on Dina not allowing her to discuss the issue, which enrages the other women as they feel Danielle can comment but Dina cannot defend herself. Danielle is taken to task for various comments, ranging from her pronunciation of "women" to the way Teresa dresses her kids to how Danielle's sex tapes may embarrass her young daughters via classmates' taunts. Danielle claims that the show edits the cast to appear as certain types of people; Caroline responds that they are all who they are and the editing doesn't change that.
| 28 | 18 | "Reunion: Part 2"^{†} | September 6, 2010 | 3.21 |

^† denotes a "super-sized" 75-minute episode (with advertisements; actual runtime around 55 minutes).
