= The Real Housewives of New Jersey season 6 =

Sixth season of the reality television series The Real Housewives of New Jersey

The Real Housewives of New Jersey
- Season 6
- Cover used by the iTunes Store (Left to right) Marchese, Manzo, Gorga, Giudice, Napolitano, and Aprea
- Starring: Dina Manzo; Teresa Giudice; Melissa Gorga; Teresa Aprea; Amber Marchese; Nicole Napolitano

Release
- Original network: Bravo
- Original release: July 13 – November 20, 2014

Season chronology
- ← Previous; Season 5 Next → Season 7

The sixth season of The Real Housewives of New Jersey, an American reality television series, premiered on July 13, 2014, and is broadcast on Bravo. It is primarily filmed in North Jersey and Central Jersey; its executive producers are Rebecca Toth Diefenbach, Valerie Haselton, Lucilla D'Agostino, Jim Fraenkel, Omid Kahangi, Caroline Self, and Andy Cohen.

The Real Housewives of New Jersey focuses on the lives of returning cast members Teresa Giudice, Melissa Gorga, and Dina Manzo; Manzo returned after originally leaving the series during season 2. Former cast members Jacqueline Laurita and Kathy Wakile appeared periodically throughout the season, but were replaced, as was Caroline Manzo, by Teresa Aprea, Amber Marchese, and Nicole Napolitano.

This season marked the final appearances of original cast member Dina Manzo, and the only appearances of newcomers Amber Marchese, Teresa Aprea and Nicole Napolitano.

== Production and crew ==
The Real Housewives of New Jersey was officially renewed for its sixth season on April 8, 2014, while its official trailer premiered on May 14, 2014. Rebecca Toth Diefenbach, Valerie Haselton, Lucilla D'Agostino, Jim Fraenkel, Omid Kahangi, Caroline Self, and Andy Cohen are recognized as the series' executive producers; it is produced and distributed by Sirens Media.

== Cast and synopsis ==
"Well, I'm asked back pretty much every year to be honest with you. It never felt right. This year, it kind of felt right between the changes going on in my life, and Teresa [Giudice] and I have organically gotten closer this past summer because of what she's going through... We became close friends again, hanging out, and it organically just happened. And they asked me last-minute. I came in last-minute."

— Dina Manzo discussing her decision to return to The Real Housewives of New Jersey.

Two of the five housewives featured on the fifth season of The Real Housewives of New Jersey returned for the sixth installment. Caroline Manzo, one of the series' original housewives, announced her departure shortly after the fifth season concluded in October 2013, and began filming for her spin-off series Manzo'd with Children. Jacqueline Laurita and Kathy Wakile, who respectively joined the series during the first and third seasons, confirmed their exits from the program in February and May 2014. Bravo officially announced the cast for the sixth season, which consists of six housewives, on May 14, 2014.

Teresa Giudice and her husband Joe handle the fallout of their highly publicized legal difficulties, while Melissa Gorga and her husband Joe embark on a business venture in the sanitation industry. Breast cancer survivor and new housewife Amber Marchese wishes to rekindle her former friendship with Gorga, while twins Teresa Aprea and Nicole Napolitano join as the second and third new Housewives of the season. Teresa and her husband Rino own a successful restaurant in Little Italy, Manhattan, while the single Nicole balances her professional pursuits with a budding relationship. Caroline Manzo's estranged sister Dina Manzo announced her return for the sixth season later in October 2013; she was originally included as an original Housewife during the first season, but left during season 2. Manzo is depicted strengthening her longtime companionship with Giudice, beginning to date while continuing with her divorce, and sending her daughter Lexi to college.

== Episodes ==
The Real Housewives of New Jersey season 6 episodes
No. overall	No. in season	Title	Original release date	U.S. viewers (millions)
96	1	"What a Difference a Plea Makes"	July 13, 2014	2.14
The season begins with Teresa reconnecting with Dina and Melissa during her legal battles. New housewife Amber reaches out to her former friend Melissa to rekindle their friendship. At Amber's party, Dina, Teresa and Melissa meet two new friends, twins Nicole Napolitano and Teresa Aprea. Meanwhile, Amber addresses her mixed feelings regarding Melissa and her previous battle with cancer.
97	2	"O, Christmas Tre"	July 20, 2014	1.64
Dina struggles with being alone as her daughter Lexi applies to college, meanwhile Teresa Aprea encourages her son to join the family business. Teresa Giudice's legal battles weigh heavily on her as she struggles to keep things normal for her family.
98	3	"Trash-Talking"	July 27, 2014	1.89
Melissa and her husband explore a new business opportunity, a state-of-the-art trash truck. Teresa Giudice also focuses on her business and invites her friends and family over to try new recipes for her new dessert line. Amber is conflicted as her husband chooses to keep his distance from Teresa Giudice due to her legal battles and his job as a mortgage broker. The twins aren't happy when they hear that someone is spreading rumors about Nicole.
99	4	"A Hairy Situation"	August 3, 2014	1.75
Nicole hosts a "First Responders" themed party with her boyfriend Bobby. The party doesn't quite go to plan when things heat up after Nicole confronts Amber on the rumors she has been spreading.
100	5	"One Flew Over the Chicken's Nest"	August 10, 2014	2.01
The "First Responders" party comes to a dramatic conclusion. Dina struggles with moving on with her love life, as feelings for her ex still hold her back. Amber and Melissa sit down to discuss the alleged rumors.
101	6	"The Family Business"	August 17, 2014	1.71
Melissa and her husband continue to pursue their new family business while Teresa Aprea and her partner work on expanding theirs. Nicole, still bothered by Amber's remarks, attempts to prove her wrong with some PDA. Feeling isolated from the group, Amber receives a phone call that leaves her leaning on her family for support.
102	7	"Roses Are Red, Dina Is Blue"	August 24, 2014	1.83
The ladies celebrate Valentine's Day in their own way. More rumors are thrown around when Victoria Gotti reveals some information to Amber and Teresa Giudice.
103	8	"Guilt Trip"	September 7, 2014	1.82
With the rumor mill in motion, news spreads about Teresa Giudice's legal battles. Dina and Melissa try to cheer her up by planning a surprise getaway. Amber texts some nasty insults to Nicole's boyfriend. Teresa and Joe make a very important legal decision.
104	9	"There Will Be Bloodwork"	September 14, 2014	1.83
Dina says goodbye to an employee who has become more like family. Teresa Aprea and her husband face a medical scare. The Giudices deal with their decision to plead guilty and Amber receives some news from her doctor.
105	10	"The Day of Jacqueline"	September 21, 2014	2.01
Dina, Melissa and the twins travel to a sunnier locale to get away from the snow in New Jersey. Dina struggles with knowing a secret about the twins' family that threatens the good nature of the getaway. Back in New Jersey, Amber waits for news about her cancer. Teresa Giudice faces a reality check and Jacqueline returns to confront her. * Note: Including reunions but not including lost footage or special episodes this is the 100th episode of the series
106	11	"Gators and Haters"	September 28, 2014	1.91
Still in Florida, tensions continue to arise between Jim, Bobby and Dina. In New Jersey, Teresa Giudice attempts to respond to Jacqueline's texts.
107	12	"Pack Your Bags and Get Out!"	October 5, 2014	2.26
In Florida, the conflict reaches a new level when the twins' family secret is revealed. The Giudices plan a getaway to New York, while Jacqueline and Chris struggle with their relationship.
108	13	"Sorry, Not Sorry"	October 12, 2014	2.18
Teresa and Rino Aprea plan a party for the launch of their new restaurant, however it seems that not everyone is invited. With a Ladybug event on the horizon, Dina attempts to get Teresa Giudice to apologize to the twins.
109	14	"Judgement Day"	October 19, 2014	2.44
Dina's Ladybug event may be derailed due to the tensions between the two Teresas. Melissa and Joe take a step towards their dream home by breaking ground and Amber begins to lose her hair again. Teresa and Joe Giudice finally learn their fate in federal court.
110	15	"Secrets Revealed Part 1"	October 26, 2014	1.80
The viewers get a look at never before seen footage of a trip to Atlantic City; Joe Giudice babysitting Milania; and Teresa Giudice and her cousin Kathy getting into a dispute over a Christmas gift.
111	16	"Reunion Part 1"	November 2, 2014	2.23
The reunion begins with the ladies reuniting to discuss some events of the season. Kathy and her sister Rosie join the stage which causes Teresa Giudice to exit the stage when the topic of her legal issues arises. Dina reveals where her relationship with her sister Caroline stands.
112	17	"Reunion Part 2"	November 6, 2014	1.40
The reunion continues with the ladies' husbands and significant others joining the stage. Teresa Giudice reveals how the show has changed her over the years and Joe opens up about his father's death.
113	18	"Reunion Part 3"	November 11, 2014	1.63
The reunion concludes with continued discussions between the wives and their significant others. Teresa Giudice opens up on her regrets and most memorable moments with the show. The Teresas argue and Dina reveals her experience with the season after her hiatus from the series.
114	19	"Secrets Revealed Part 2"	November 20, 2014	0.86
More never-before-seen moments from season 6 are revealed.
