= Walter Josephs =

Walter Josephs (22 November 1822 – 24 January 1893) was an English educationalist and Jewish communal worker.

== Biography ==
Josephs was born in London, the son of noted Hebraist and businessman Michael Josephs. He attended Hyman Hurwitz's Highgate Academy.

He was closely connected with the management of several Jewish educational and charitable institutions. He served as the honorary secretary of the Jews' Infant School from its founding in 1840 and was involved with the Jews' Free School, the West Metropolitan Jews' School, the Jews' Hospital, the Jews' Emigration Society, and the Anglo-Jewish Association.

Josephs was a vocal proponent of reform within Jewish religious practices, and in 1874 founded the Association for Effecting a Modification in the Liturgy of the German Jews.

== Honours ==
In 1837, Josephs was awarded the Freedom of the City of London. He was also the first Jew to be admitted into the Drapers' Company. In recognition of his dedication to Jewish education, Josephs was honoured in January 1877 with a testimonial commemorating his many years of service.
