= Mordecai Paldiel =

Jewish historian

- Markus Wajsfeld
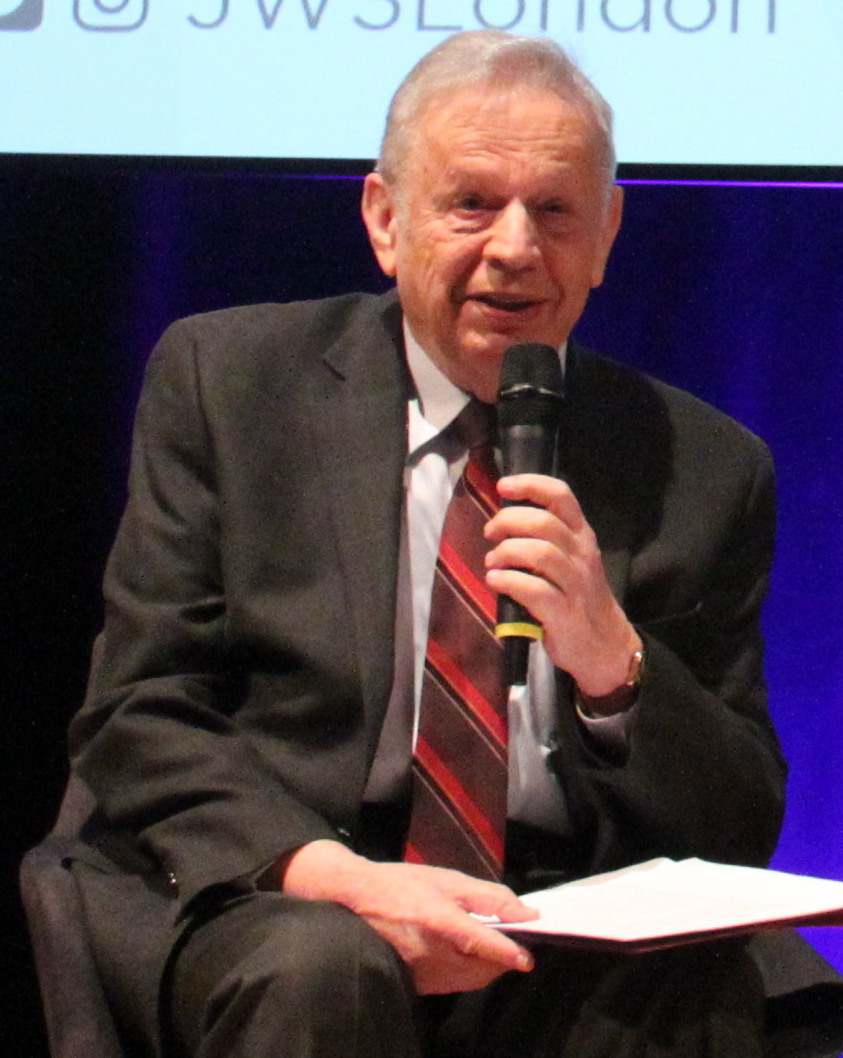
- Paldiel in 2019
- Born: March 10, 1937 (age 89); Antwerp, Belgium
- Education: Hebrew University (BA); Temple University (MA; PhD)
- Spouse: Rachel Mizrahi (m. 1966)
- Children: 3, including Siggy Flicker

Mordecai Paldiel (born Markus Wajsfeld, March 10, 1937) is a lecturer at Stern College (Yeshiva University) and Queens College in New York.

== Early life and education ==
Paldiel was born into a Hasidic family of Szlomo Wajsfeld, a diamond trader originally from Miechów near Kraków, and Hinde (née Labin) from Uhnów (now Ukraine) as one of their five children before World War II. Thanks to a Catholic Priest who was able to smuggle them across the border, the family fled from Nazi occupied Belgium via France to Switzerland in 1940 when he was 3 years old. Later after the war the family emigrated to New York:

When you have stories of people who acted contrary to that and said 'I'm going to save lives, even at risk to myself,' you should talk about these people too. The good deeds should rub off on you too.

He received a Bachelor of Arts from Hebrew University and a Master of Arts and PhD in Religion and Holocaust Studies from Temple University in Philadelphia. Paldiel is the former Director (1984–2007) of the Department of the Righteous Among the Nations at Yad Vashem in Jerusalem. He has written several books devoted to the subject including The Path of the Righteous: Gentile Rescuers of Jews During the Holocaust published in 1993 by the KTAV Publishing House.

== Personal life ==
Paldiel married Rachel Mizrahi in 1966 in Israel. The couple has 3 children, son Eli and daughters Sigalit "Siggy" and Iris.

His eldest daughter Siggy Flicker is a relationship expert and television personality who appeared on the Bravo reality television series The Real Housewives of New Jersey from 2016 to 2018.

== Publications ==
- Mordecai Paldiel (1982), Secular Dualism: The 'religious' Nature of Hitler's Antisemitism, Temple University
- Mordecai Paldiel (1992), כל המקיים נפש אחת: חסידי אומות העולם וייחודם University of Michigan
- Mordecai Paldiel (1993), The Path of the Righteous: Gentile Rescuers of Jews .., ISBN 0881253766
- Mordecai Paldiel (1996), Sheltering the Jews: stories of Holocaust rescuers, ISBN 0800628977
- Mordecai Paldiel (2006), Churches and the Holocaust: Unholy Teaching .., ISBN 088125908X
- Mordecai Paldiel (2007), Diplomat Heroes of the Holocaust, ISBN 0881259098
- Mordecai Paldiel (2007), The righteous among the nations, ISBN 0061151122
- Mordecai Paldiel (2011), Saving the Jews: Men and Women who Defied the Final Solution, ISBN 1589797345
- Mordecai Paldiel (2017), Saving One's Own: Jewish Rescuers During the Holocaust, ISBN 0827612974.
