= Michael Josephs (Hebraist) =

English Hebraist, merchant, and communal leader (1763–1849)

- Born: October 8, 1763; Königsberg, Prussia
- Died: February 9, 1849 (aged 85); London, United Kingdom
- Spouse: Sarah Nathan (died 1843)
- Writing career
- Notable work: Midrash Millin (1834)

Michael Josephs (Hebrew: מאיר בן יוסף; October 8, 1763 – February 9, 1849), also known as Myer Königsberg (Yiddish: מאיר קעניגסבערג), was an English Hebraist, merchant, and communal leader. He is best known for his English and Hebrew lexicon, Midrash Millin.

== Early life and education ==
Michael Josephs was born in Königsberg, Prussia, in 1763. He left his hometown at the age of 12 to study at a yeshiva in Berlin. While there, he gained the patronage of Chief Rabbi Hirschel Levin, was introduced to Moses Mendelssohn, and became associated with the Haskalah. He was originally known as Meyer Königsberg, after his birthplace.

== Career ==
In 1781, Josephs relocated to London, where he pursued a career in commerce while maintaining a strong interest in Hebrew literature. Josephs was regarded as one of the foremost Hebraists in England during his time, and his expertise was consulted by prominent rabbis. In 1830, he helped establish the Society for the Cultivation of the Hebrew Language and Literature, which lasted only one year. He contributed to various Hebrew periodicals, with his poetic works published in The Hebrew Review, The Voice of Jacob, and The Jewish Chronicle.

Alongside Chief Rabbi Solomon Hirschell and Joshua Van Oven, Josephs was instrumental in founding the Jews' Free School in Spitalfields in 1817. Josephs took an active role in teaching and examining both students and teachers. He also served as a Life Governor of the Jews' Hospital and Treasurer of the Great Synagogue.

In his correspondences, Josephs indicated some support for religious reform, including the abolition of "small customs which disturbed order" such as noisemakers on Purim.

== Death and legacy ==
Josephs died in London on February 9, 1849. Upon his death, Leopold Dukes composed a Hebrew epitaph in his honour. His son Walter donated several hundred volumes from Joseph's library to Jews' College in 1861.

== Work ==
Josephs authored several works of poetry and prose in Hebrew, including odes and anniversary poems for different Jewish associations. For many years he composed the Hebrew odes recited at the anniversary banquets of the Jews' Free School.

His major work was an English-Hebrew dictionary titled Midrash Millin ('Interpretation of Words'), published in 1834 and dedicated to Duke of Sussex, a prominent patron of Hebrew studies. The English entries were based on Johnson's Dictionary of the English Language, while their Hebrew translations were sourced from vocabulary found in both the Tanakh and Rabbinic literature. He also compiled an unpublished Rabbinical Hebrew-English dictionary of scientific and philosophical terms.

=== Selected publications ===
- Laws of the Congregation of the Great Synagogue, Duke's Place, London (in Hebrew and English). London: J. Wertheimer. 1827.
- Midrash Milim. An English and Hebrew Lexicon to Which is Added a Selection of Proper Names Occurring in Scriptures and in Rabbinical Writings. London: B. Wertheim. 1834.
- Jeshurun's Praise: A Hebrew Poem in Honor of Sir Moses Montefiore on His Return from His Mission to the East (in Hebrew, English, and German). London: J. Wertheimer. 1841.
