= Robert Josephs =

American neuroscientist (born 1961)

Robert A. Josephs (born March 29, 1961) is an American Professor of Psychology at The University of Texas at Austin who has conducted research on the behavioral, emotional, and cognitive effects of acute alcohol intoxication. Currently, his primary area of research is on human behavioral endocrinology with an emphasis on hormone-gene interactions, and hormone-hormone interactions.

== Biography ==
He graduated from Cornell University in 1983. Before entering graduate school in the Fall of 1984, he spent a year teaching algebra, geometry, and trigonometry to inmates at the Tompkins County Jail in Ithaca, NY. He received his M.S. in Social Psychology from the University of Washington in 1986, and his Ph.D. in Social Psychology from the University of Michigan in 1990. He was hired as an Assistant Professor of Psychology at the University of Texas at Austin in 1990 and is now a Full Professor. He is a Member of the Institute For Neuroscience, and the Institute for Mental Health Research, both located in Austin, Texas.
