= Dolores Catania =

American television personality (born 1970)

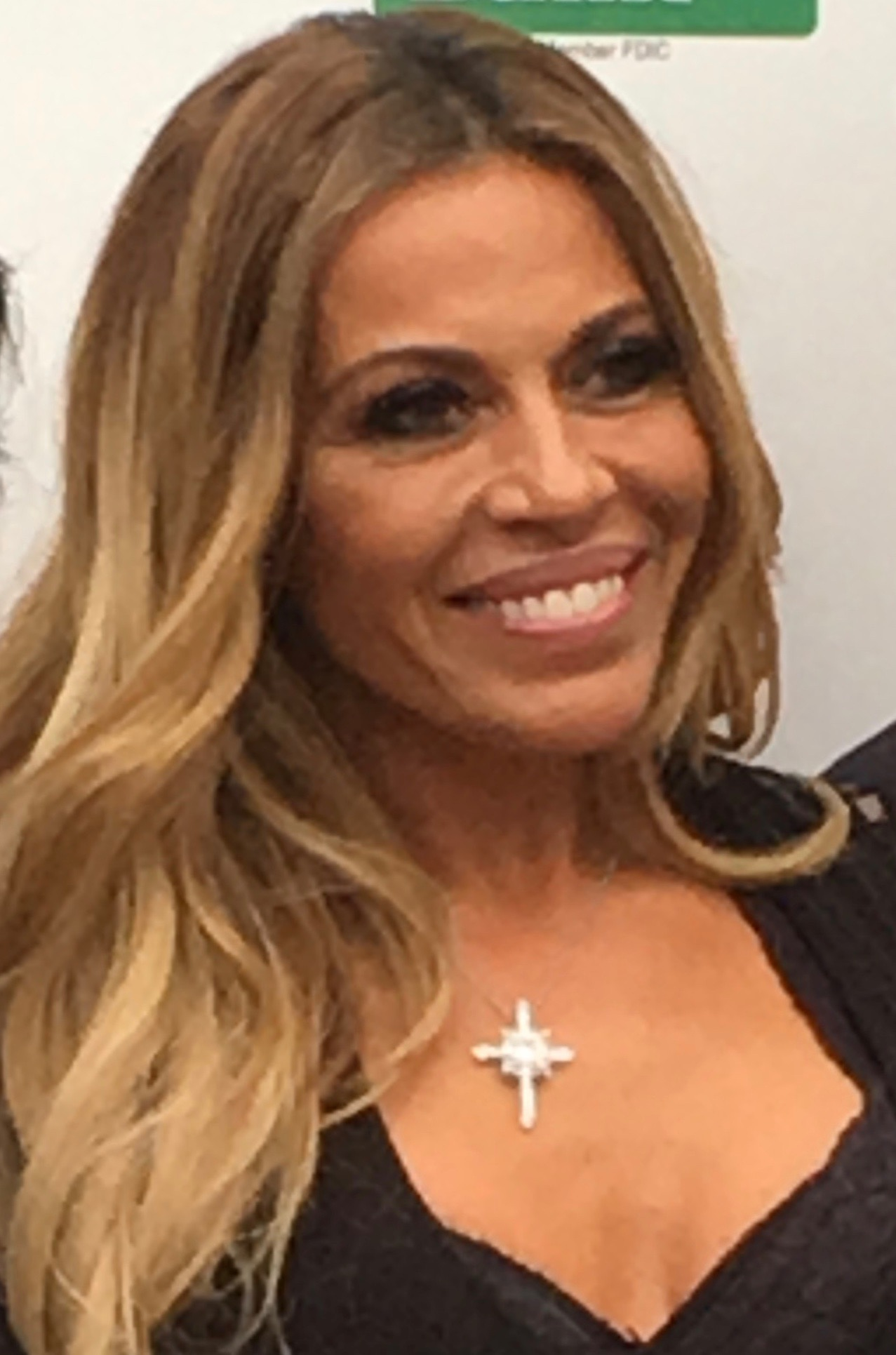
- Catania at premiere of Breaking Points
- Born: Dolores Spagnola; December 28, 1970 (age 55); Paterson, New Jersey, U.S.
- Occupations: Entrepreneur; philanthropist; television personality
- Years active: 2009–present
- Spouse: Frank Catania II (m. 1994; div. 1998)
- Partner(s): David Principe (2017–2021); Paulie Connell (2021–present; engaged)
- Children: 2

Dolores Catania (née Spagnola; born December 28, 1970) is an American television personality, philanthropist, and entrepreneur. She is best known as a main cast member of the reality television show The Real Housewives of New Jersey, appearing in that capacity since the show's seventh season in 2016.

== Early life ==
Catania was born in Paterson, New Jersey to Lawrence and Valerie Spagnola. Her father is a former Paterson Chief of Police and her mother is a homemaker. She has three sisters, Laura, Tonya, and Valerie "Val", and a brother, Louis.

Catania and her siblings were raised in Paterson along with her fellow Real Housewives of New Jersey co-star Teresa Giudice and Giudice's cousin and former cast member Kathy Wakile.

In season 11 of The Real Housewives of New Jersey, Dolores revealed that her parents have remained happily married, despite living separately since her father became Paterson's Chief of Police.

== Career ==
Prior to her career in television, Catania worked as a waitress and shampoo girl before becoming a corrections officer, following her aspirations to become a cop; she later became a realtor and surgical assistant.

In 2016, Catania gained wide recognition when she joined the cast of Bravo's The Real Housewives of New Jersey for its seventh season, having previously made subsequent appearances on the show during its early seasons. In February 2017, she and her ex-husband Frank Catania opened the Powerhouse Fitness Center in Whippany, New Jersey. She was voted "Miss Congeniality" across the entire Real Housewives syndicate by Bravo fans in 2018. The same year she appeared in the short film Breaking Points.

In 2019, Catania re-entered real estate with Frank, specializing in flipping houses and listing a Wayne, New Jersey property in April 2019. Despite setbacks attributed to COVID-19, they continued their house flipping business throughout 2021. In 2024, Catania revealed she and Frank were no longer working together in real estate.

In June 2024, Catania was announced as one of the competitors of the Peacock reality competition series, The Traitors for the third season, which premiered on January 9, 2025. She won the series as a "Faithful", alongside Lord Ivar Mountbatten, Gabby Windey, and Dylan Efron. In November 2025, it was announced that Catania would be joining the debut season of The Real Housewives of Rhode Island in a friend of capacity. In August 2026, Catania was a celebrity judge in People magazine's World's Cutest Rescue Dog Contest.

== Philanthropy ==
In February 2017, Catania donated $100,000 worth of infant items to new parents at St. Joseph's Children's Hospital in Paterson, New Jersey. Since 2017, Catania has hosted the annual 'Battle for Brooklyn' fundraising softball game for Maimonides Breast Cancer Hospital at Maimonides Park in Brooklyn, with their events often raising over $100,000. Participants of the event have included Teresa Giudice, Melissa Gorga, Margaret Josephs, Kelly Killoren Bensimon, Dorinda Medley and Chanel Ayan. In October 2020, she was recognized by Maimonides Hospital by receiving the Pink Ambassador of Hope Award at their annual Pink Runway Fashion Show.

In April 2020, in attempt to benefit those affected by the Coronavirus pandemic, Catania collaborated with Spartan Team Preps, RX Water, Dolce Aesthetics NY, and Muves footwear to donate 100 meals, 240 water bottles, 100 face masks and gloves, and 100 pairs of shoes, in addition to her partnership with the nonprofit Oasis, which provided groceries to underprivileged women and children, and The Kids For Kids Foundation's Hamburgers for Heroes initiative, which provided meals to officers and first responders.

In May 2020, she, along with Julian Edelman, Isiah Thomas and Skylar Astin worked with 333 Charity and the UJA-Federation of New York to raise funds for Holocaust survivors who were unable to leave their homes due to the coronavirus. Also that year, she was given the key to the city of Paterson in recognition of her dedication to the community.

In July 2025, she told Us Weekly she donated her share of the $204,300 grand prize money she won on The Traitors to shelters.

== Personal life ==
Dolores married Frank Catania on September 16, 1994. The pair have two children, Gabrielle "Gaby" (born 1995) and Frank "Frankie" III (born 1998). During her first season as Housewife, Catania disclosed that Frank had been unfaithful while she was nine months pregnant with Frankie, effectively ending their marriage.

In 2017, she started dating maternal-fetal medicine specialist David Principe. The two were introduced by Catania's friend and former co-star Siggy Flicker. The couple announced their split in December 2021.

In 2021, she began dating Paul "Paulie" Connell, the Dublin-born father of two sons, whom she met in a line at an Apple Store. She moved into his home shortly after they began dating. In November 2025, Connell proposed to Catania in the same Apple Store where they first met.
