= Siggy Flicker =

Israeli American relationship specialist

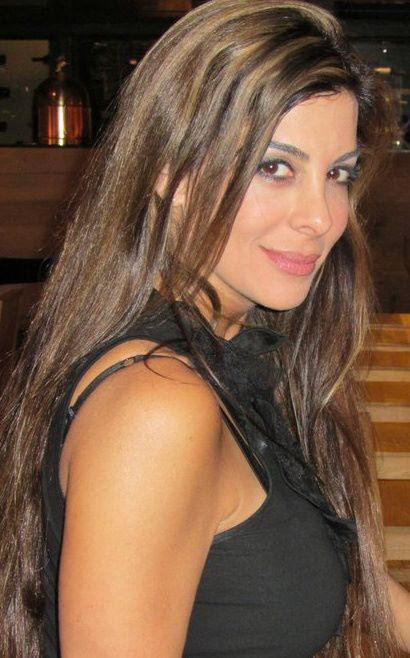
- Flicker in 2014
- Born: Sigalit Paldiel; June 1, 1967 (age 59); Jerusalem, Israel
- Education: Cherry Hill West High School
- Alma mater: Monmouth University (BA)
- Occupations: Professional matchmaker; television personality; public speaker; advocate
- Political party: Democrat (before 2016); Republican (since 2016)
- Spouses: Mark Flicker (m. 1997; div. 2007) Michael Campanella (m. 2012)
- Children: 2
- Family: Mordecai Paldiel (father)

Sigalit "Siggy" Flicker (née Paldiel; born June 1, 1967) is an Israeli-American advocate, relationship expert, television personality and public speaker. Flicker initially gained recognition as a matchmaker, making guest appearances on numerous morning and talk shows, and hosting the VH1 series Why Am I Still Single?!, displaying her expertise. From 2016 to 2018, she was a main cast member on Bravo's The Real Housewives of New Jersey.

Since then, Flicker has been an advocate for Israelis and Israeli Jews; often speaking out against antisemitism. In 2025, she was appointed to the U.S. Holocaust Memorial Council by United States President Donald Trump.

== Early life and education ==
Flicker was born in Jerusalem, Israel, in 1967, when her mother Rachel went into labor "in an Israeli bomb shelter," and her father, Mordecai Paldiel, fought in the Six-Day War. She and her family moved to the United States when she was five, settling in Cherry Hill, New Jersey. She is of Ashkenazi Jewish and Mizrahi Jewish descent with Polish, Ukrainian, and Iraqi roots. Her mother named her Sigalit after the Hebrew word for "violet." Her father is a lecturer at Stern College for Women and Queens College. After graduating from Cherry Hill High School West, she attended Monmouth University, where she subsequently earned a Bachelor of Arts degree in communications, while supporting herself by working as a waitress at a TGI Fridays.

== Career ==
Upon graduating from college, Flicker began her career as a professional matchmaker and has appeared as a guest on television programs, including The Wendy Williams Show, Good Morning America, Dr. Phil, and The Today Show, offering relationship advice. After she and her husband of 10 years divorced amicably, she acted as his matchmaker. In 2011, after having been a matchmaker for more than 20 years, Flicker hosted the VH1 reality dating show, Why Am I Single?! Each episode featured two clients, a man and a woman, who were having trouble dating. Flicker sent each client on a test date with one of her recruiters without informing the clients who they're dating. Afterward, she gave each client lessons in an effort to improve their dating habits.

In 2013, she began writing monthly relationship advice columns for Marie Claire entitled 'Single with Siggy'. In 2015, Flicker published her relationship-advice book, Write Your Own Fairy Tale: The New Rules for Dating, Relationships, and Finding Love on Your Terms.

In August 2015, Flicker, along with television personality Sammi "Sweetheart" Giancola and Clare Galterio started their podcast, Just Sayin'. In May 2016, Flicker was announced as the newest cast member for the seventh season of Bravo network's reality series, The Real Housewives of New Jersey, making her the first Israeli cast member of the franchise. On December 22, 2017, Flicker announced her departure from the show after two seasons.

=== Advocacy and recognition ===
Flicker has been an advocate for Jews and Israelis for many years, often speaking at events or raising awareness about Jewish history and The Holocaust. In June 2018, Flicker was the grand marshal at the 54th Annual Salute to Israel Day Parade in New York City, where she co-chaired the accompanying concert in Central Park. The following month, she was honored at the seventh annual Algemeiner Summer Benefit. In June 2019, she spoke at the Jewish National Fund's first Women for Israel event.

Since 2020, Flicker has served as the national spokeswoman for JEXIT, a political movement aiming to encourage American Jews to leave the Democratic Party.

On May 7, 2025, President Trump appointed Flicker along with twelve others as members of the U.S. Holocaust Memorial Council for the Holocaust Museum, which replaced members of the council that Trump had previously fired. In September, The Jerusalem Post included Flicker on their list of "50 Most Influential Jews", ranked 45th in a group entry of "seven pro-Israel influencers," which also included actress Gal Gadot, writer Hen Mazzig, and executive director of UN Watch, Hillel Neuer.

== Personal life ==
In 1997, she married Mark Flicker, with whom she has two children. The couple divorced in 2007. In 2012, she married Michael Campanella, both of whom previously resided in Tenafly, New Jersey, before relocating to Boca Raton, Florida.

Flicker is a public supporter of Donald Trump and the Republican party, having previously been a Democrat prior to 2016. She is also a member of Trump's Mar-a-Lago Club. In 2024, her stepson, Tyler Campanella, was arrested for participating in the 2021 January 6 attack on the United States Capitol.
