= Danielle Staub =

American reality television personality (born 1962)

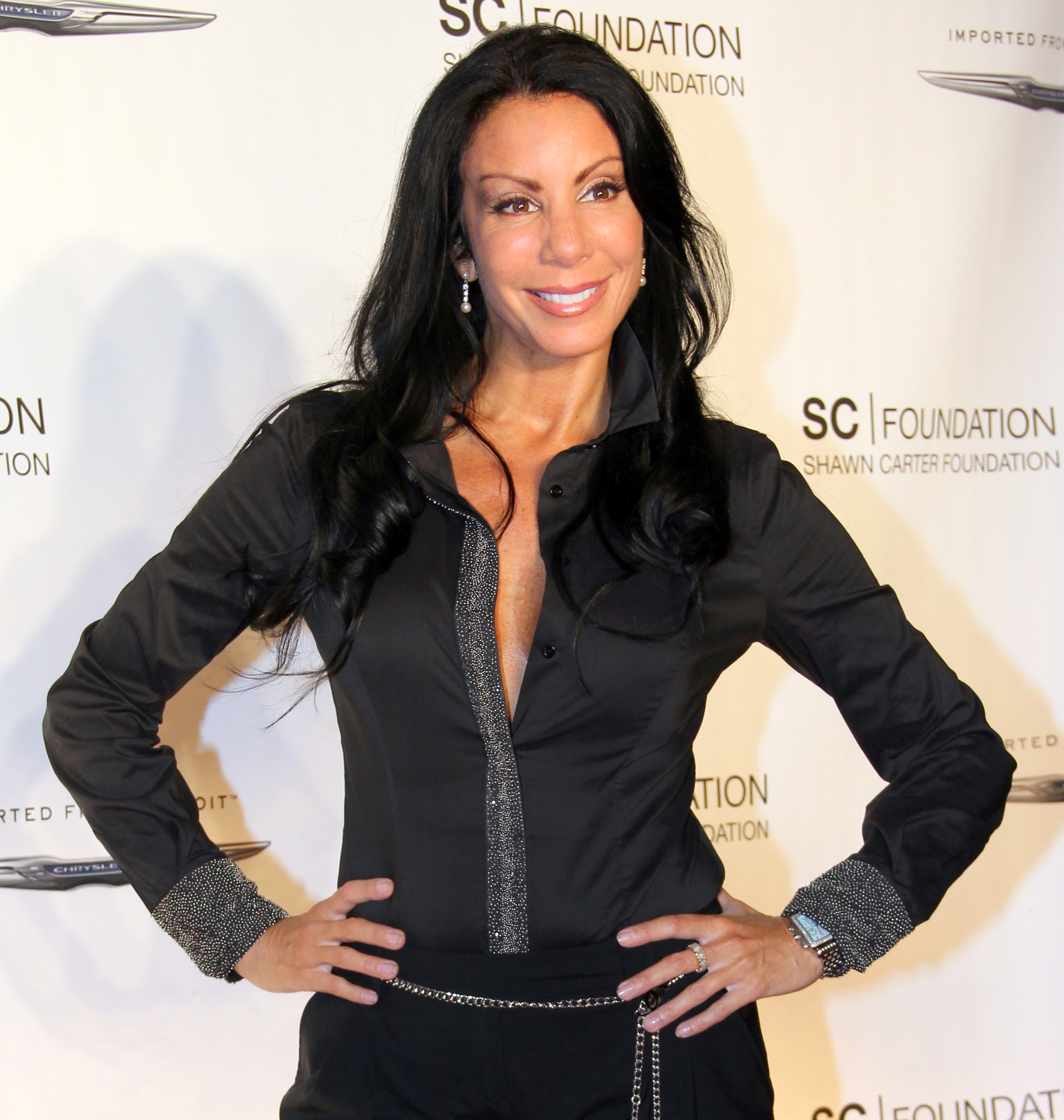
- Staub in September 2011
- Born: Beverly Ann Merrill; July 29, 1962 (age 64); Wayne, New Jersey, U.S.
- Occupation: Television personality
- Years active: 2001–present
- Spouses: Kevin Maher (m. 1986; div. 1987) Thomas Staub (m. 1993; div. 2007) Marty Caffrey (m. 2018; div. 2019)
- Children: 2

Danielle Staub (born Beverly Ann Merrill; July 29, 1962) is an American reality television personality. In May 2009, she came to prominence after being cast in the reality television series The Real Housewives of New Jersey, as a main cast member for two seasons (2009–10), and afterward as a friend for three more seasons (2017–20).

== Early life ==
Staub was adopted and raised in Athens, Pennsylvania. She said in her autobiography The Naked Truth that multiple relatives sexually abused her, writing, "The memory goes back as far as 8 years old. By 11, I started fighting back."

== Career ==
In 2001, Staub briefly acted in an episode of All My Children. In 2009, Staub joined the cast of The Real Housewives of New Jersey, where she appeared in the first two seasons. After weeks of speculation, Bravo announced that Staub would not be returning to the show for season three, giving no reason.

In September 2010, she appeared on the Style Network comedy program The Dish. She acted in several sketches, including a surprise cold open where she tried to take over as the show's host after leaving the real presenter, Danielle Fishel, bound and gagged backstage. In 2011, Staub starred in a food-related reality series for VH1 called Famous Food, in which they would "[revamp] a restaurant from the ground up." In August 2017, it was announced that Staub would return to The Real Housewives of New Jersey, in a "friend of the housewives" capacity. She appeared as a recurring cast member for seasons 8, 9 and 10. On January 8, 2020, Staub announced her permanent departure from The Real Housewives of New Jersey.

In July 2020, Staub launched a podcast Absolutely Danielle.

In October 2023, Staub appeared as a surprise guest on House of Villains.

== Personal life ==
Staub has been married three times. She was married to Kevin Maher from 1986 to 1987, and to Thomas Staub, the father of her daughters Christine and Jillian, from 1993 to 2007. In May 2017, it was announced Staub was engaged to Marty Caffrey. The two wed in May 2018. In August 2018, it was announced the couple would divorce. Their divorce was finalized on February 21, 2019.

In June 2010, her home in Wayne, New Jersey, which had been featured on The Real Housewives of New Jersey, was put up for sale. In June 2012, Staub filed for bankruptcy. As of the end of 2014, the property was listed as a short sale in connection with Staub's successful completion of a bankruptcy filing.

== Controversies and legal situations ==
During the first season of The Real Housewives of New Jersey, other participants in the reality show confronted Staub with Charles Kipps' book Cop Without a Badge, which recounted events that surrounded Kevin Maher, an undercover FBI informer, who had once been married to Staub; Cop Without a Badge also included an account of Staub's arrest. Known at the time as Beverly Merrill, Staub cooperated with authorities and received five years' probation. Staub had been arrested in June 1986, but she denied many of the other allegations Maher had made. Staub's autobiography The Naked Truth was released on May 25, 2010, and in it, she wrote that her arrest was a matter of "wrong place/wrong time."

In October 2009, Staub's ex-husband Kevin Maher sued her for defamation of character after allegations were made about him; it was settled out of court. In October 2010, Staub was sued again by Maher for making false allegations in her memoir The Naked Truth, after notifying the publisher Simon & Schuster, a lawsuit would be filed if the book was published.

In 2009, Staub pressed charges against Ashley Holmes, the daughter of fellow Housewife Jacqueline Laurita, for pulling out her hair extension at a fashion show in Wayne, New Jersey. In January 2010, Holmes, then 19, was convicted of assault and fined $189.

== Bibliography ==
- The Naked Truth (autobiography, with Steven Priggé) 2010, Gallery; ISBN 978-1-4391-8289-5
