= Margaret Josephs =

American entrepreneur, fashion designer, and television personality

- Born: Margaret Katona; April 9, 1967 (age 59); Elizabeth, New Jersey, U.S.
- Other name: The Marge
- Education: Fashion Institute of Technology (BA)
- Occupations: Designer; entrepreneur; television personality
- Years active: 1999–present
- Known for: Macbeth Collection; The Real Housewives of New Jersey
- Spouses: Jan Josephs (m. 1994; div. 2013) Joe Benigno (m. 2013)
- Children: 1
- Website: www.macbethcollection.com

Margaret Katona Josephs (born April 9, 1967) is an American designer, entrepreneur and television personality. She is the owner, founder and designer of a lifestyle brand called The Macbeth Collection. She garnered greater recognition in 2017, when she joined the Bravo reality television series The Real Housewives of New Jersey in its eighth season, where she remained a prominent role before departing after its fourteenth season.

== Early life and education ==
Josephs was born in Elizabeth, New Jersey to Hungarian immigrants and raised in Mahopac, New York. She would attend Austin Road Elementary School and graduate from Mahopac High School in 1985, before earning a degree in fashion design at the Fashion Institute of Technology.

Afterwards, she worked in New York's Garment Center as a dress designer. While working here, she was inspired by the prints and fabrics she worked with which later influenced her own line. After the birth of her son, she decided to establish her own line of decoupage home accessories.

== Career ==
Josephs launched The Macbeth Collection in 1999, after realizing the popularity of her decoupage metal buckets and accessories. It has successfully transitioned into a lifestyle brand including tech, clothing and fashion accessories. In 2012, CNN Money reported that The Macbeth Collection brought in an annual sale of $26 million. According to Women's Wear Daily, the MacBeth Collection was sued for copyright infringement by popular brand Vineyard Vines.

In 2015, Josephs developed the lifestyle accessory line Candie Couture, which is sold at Walmart. In August 2017, it was announced Josephs had joined the cast of The Real Housewives of New Jersey for its eighth season, which premiered on October 4, 2017. In March 2026, Josephs announced her departure from the series after seven seasons.

From 2020, she started her podcast, Caviar Dreams, Tuna Fish Budget with Margaret Josephs with co-host Lexi Barbuto; the podcast ended in 2023. The following year, Josephs released her memoir of the same name, Caviar Dreams, Tuna Fish Budget How to Survive in Business and Life. In 2023, Josephs and Barbuto launched their mocktail line Soirée; the beverage brand is low calorie, gluten free, and comes in four flavors (Coco colado, Teajito, Marge-a-rite and Cool breeze).

== Personal life ==
Josephs currently resides in Englewood, New Jersey. She is a former resident of Tenafly, where her former home has been featured in many publications, such as 201 Magazine. Margaret Josephs married her first husband, Jan Josephs, in New York City. They had one son together and Jan Josephs had three children from a previous marriage. She is now married to her second husband, Joe Benigno.

== Awards and honors ==
- Country Living Entrepreneur of the Year, 2007
- Honorary Judge on the panel of Country Living Entrepreneur of the Year, 2008
