= Teresa Giudice =

American TV personality (born 1972)

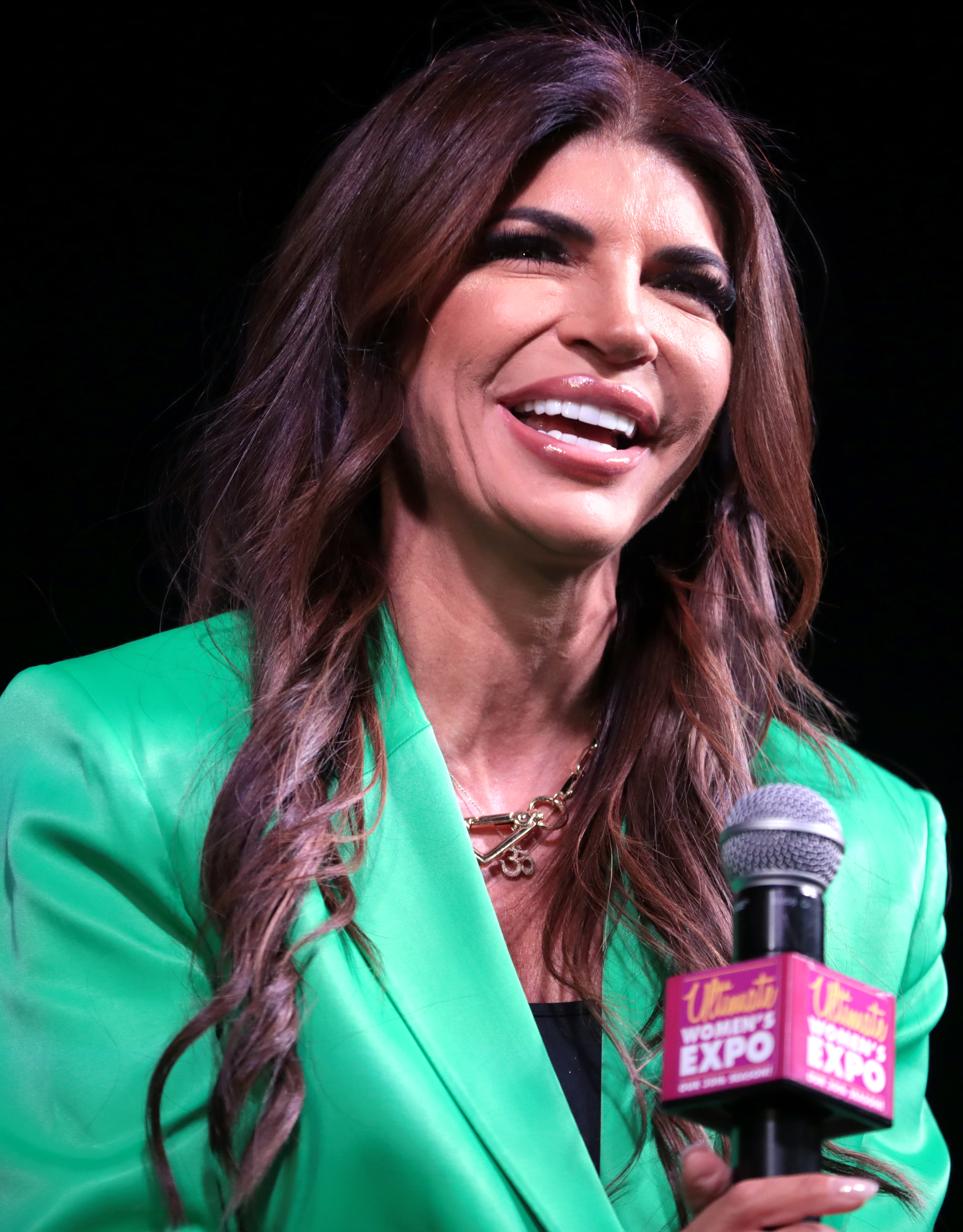
- Giudice in 2023
- Born: Teresa Gorga; May 18, 1972 (age 54); Paterson, New Jersey, U.S.
- Education: Berkeley College (AA)
- Occupation: Television personality
- Years active: 2009–present
- Spouses: Joe Giudice (m. 1999; div. 2020) Louie Ruelas (m. 2022)
- Children: 4, including Gia
- Relatives: Melissa Gorga (sister-in-law); Kathy Wakile (cousin)

Teresa Giudice (/ˈdʒuːdɪtʃeɪ/ JOO-ditch-ay, (Note: Often pronounced with the Anglicized reading /ˈdʒuːdaɪs/ JOO-dysse, a pronunciation Giudice herself tolerates but advises against.) Italian: [teˈrɛːza ˈdʒuːditʃe]; née Gorga; born May 18, 1972) is an American television personality and author best known for being a main cast member on The Real Housewives of New Jersey since 2009. Besides appearing on the show, Giudice wrote multiple New York Times bestseller cookbooks and was featured on Donald Trump's The Celebrity Apprentice 5 (2012).

In December 2015, she was released from prison after serving 11 months of a 15-month sentence for fraud, while her husband and four daughters resided in the Towaco section of Montville, New Jersey. She is known for her extravagant lifestyle and highly publicized financial and legal troubles leading up to her felony conviction and prison sentence. Her ex-husband, Joe, began his 41-month sentence in March 2016.

== Early life ==
Giudice was born Teresa Gorga in Paterson, New Jersey, to Giacinto and Antonia Campiglia Gorga, Italian immigrants from Sala Consilina, Campania. She and her younger brother Giuseppe "Joe" Gorga were raised in the Roman Catholic faith. She studied fashion marketing at Berkeley College in New Jersey.

== Career ==
Giudice worked for Macy's as an associate buyer. She has been a cast member of The Real Housewives of New Jersey since season one. Since season eight, she has been the last-remaining original cast member of the show. In 2009, one of Giudice's infamous stunts on the show was her flipping a dinner table on Danielle Staub for telling Giudice to "pay attention".

Since starring on Housewives, Giudice has co-authored three successful cookbooks that include recipes handed down from her mother: Skinny Italian (May 4, 2010), Fabulicious (May 3, 2011), and Fabulicious!: Fast & Fit (May 8, 2012) alongside a memoir, co-written with K.C. Baker, Turning the Tables: From Housewife to Inmate and Back Again, revolving around her time in prison. Giudice's sixth book, Standing Strong, was released on October 3, 2017. All four books have been New York Times Best Sellers. Giudice also created Fabellini, a line of bellini cocktails, as well as a haircare line with Jerel Sabella named after Giudice's daughter Milania.

In 2012, Giudice joined the cast of The Celebrity Apprentice 5 (also known as The Apprentice 12), and ultimately raised $70,000 for her selected charity, The NephCure Foundation, before being fired in task 13, placing fifth.

Giudice starred in The Real Housewives Ultimate Girls Trip, a spin-off featuring various women from The Real Housewives franchise, which premiered on Peacock in November 2021.

On September 8, 2022, Giudice was announced as a contestant on season 31 of Dancing with the Stars. She was partnered with Pasha Pashkov. They were eliminated week 2, finishing in 15th place. Later that year, she made an appearance in the VH1 television film Fuhgeddabout Christmas.

On March 27, 2024, it was announced that Giudice would be competing as a contestant on the second season of E!'s reality competition series House of Villains, which premiered that October. In 2024, she also launched Turning The Tables By Teresa Giudice, a podcast with the Hurrdat Media Network.

== Personal life ==
Teresa was married to Giuseppe "Joe" Giudice on October 23, 1999, in Newark, New Jersey. He is an Italian citizen born in Sala Consilina, Italy, and brought to Paterson, New Jersey, by his parents when he was a one-year-old. He worked as a construction builder and restaurant owner in New Jersey. He never obtained U.S. citizenship. They have four daughters together: Gia (b. January 2001), Gabriella (b. October 2004), Milania (b. February 2006), and Audriana (b. September 2009), whom she gave birth to while taping the second season of the show.

After her release from prison, Giudice became a competitive bodybuilder.

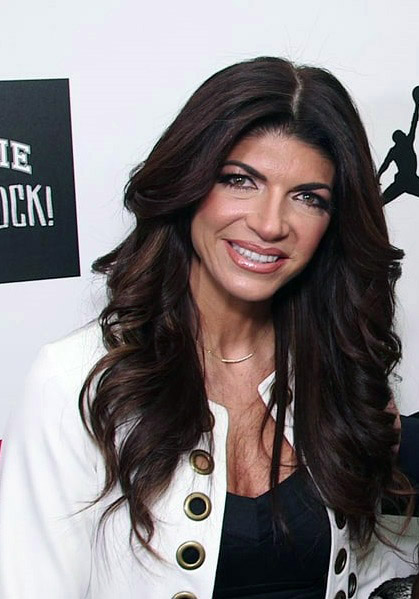
Giudice at New York Fashion Week 2016

Giudice supported Donald Trump, whom she worked for on The Apprentice, in the 2016 United States presidential election saying "I think he's amazing. I think he'll make a great president."

Teresa Giudice's mother, Antonia Gorga, died on March 3, 2017, at age 66 from pneumonia. Her father, Giacinto Gorga, died on April 3, 2020, at age 76. Her parents both appeared many times on the television show.

In December 2019, it was announced that Giudice and her husband had separated after 20 years of marriage. Teresa filed for divorce a few months later, and in September 2020, a rep confirmed the divorce had been finalized.

In July 2020, Giudice started dating Luis "Louie" Ruelas, and they became engaged in October 2021. The couple was married on August 6, 2022, in East Brunswick, New Jersey. He has two sons. Teresa Gets Married, featuring the couple's wedding, aired on Bravo on May 23, 2023.

Giudice has ADHD.

== Legal issues ==
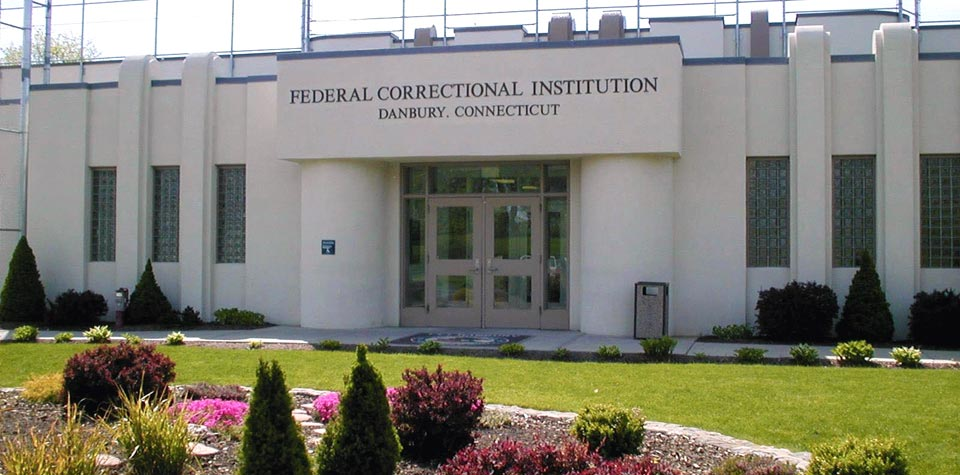
FCI Danbury, where Giudice was incarcerated

In October 2009, the Giudices filed for bankruptcy. An auction of furniture from their Montville, New Jersey, home was initially scheduled for August 22, 2010, but was postponed and then canceled as the couple withdrew their bankruptcy petition.

On July 29, 2013, Teresa and Joe Giudice were charged with conspiracy to commit mail fraud, wire fraud, and bank fraud, making false statements on loan applications, and bankruptcy fraud in a 39-count indictment. The indictment also charged Joe Giudice with failing to file tax returns for 2004 through 2008, during which time he allegedly earned nearly $1 million. Teresa's attorney told the Associated Press she would plead not guilty and "we look forward to vindicating her."

On August 14, 2013, the two pleaded not guilty to financial fraud charges in federal court in Newark, New Jersey.

Joe Giudice stood trial on November 19, 2013, on separate state charges that he used marriage and birth certificates belonging to his brother to fraudulently obtain a driver's license in 2010. Giudice's own driver's license had been suspended following a DUI arrest on January 13, 2010. After he was convicted, Joe's license was suspended for 12 months and he was sentenced to 20 days of community service. As he employed the same defense attorney in both trials, U.S. District Judge Esther Salas moved the date of the tax case, involving both Teresa and Joe, from October 8, 2013, to February 24, 2014.

On March 4, 2014, Teresa and Joe entered guilty pleas to 41 counts of fraud following a deal struck with federal prosecutors. They were accused of engaging in bank, mail, wire, and bankruptcy fraud, which allegedly saw them net over $5 million over a 10-year period. Joe was additionally charged with failure to file a tax return. As part of his guilty plea, he admitted that during the tax years 2004 through 2008, he received income totaling $996,459 but did not file tax returns for those years. On October 2, 2014, Teresa was sentenced to 15 months in federal prison; Joe was sentenced to 41 months, followed by his potential deportation to Italy. Together, the couple were ordered to pay $414,588 in restitution.

The couple were allowed to stagger their sentences so one parent could stay with their children. She began her sentence first on January 5, 2015. Accompanied by her lawyer, she surrendered herself to the Federal Correctional Institution in Danbury, Connecticut (seven hours ahead of schedule). At Danbury, Teresa was known as Inmate No. 65703-050 and was scheduled for a two-month early release on February 16, 2016. She was ultimately released on December 23, 2015.

In July 2015, Giudice's primary residence in Towaco, New Jersey was in the preliminary stages of foreclosure, while the couple's summer home in Beach Haven West, in Stafford Township, New Jersey, was foreclosed; the latter was auctioned in a sheriff's sale on August 18, 2015, and received no bids. Their mortgage holder bought back the residence for $100. In November 2015, Giudice's primary residence was no longer in foreclosure.

In December 2014, Giudice filed a $5 million lawsuit against her bankruptcy lawyer, James Kridel, for failing to meet with her before filing bankruptcy documents. In March 2017, the lawsuit was announced to be moving forward.

In June 2018, it was announced Giudice's bankruptcy case from 2009 had been dismissed. Giudice will pay restitution to the New Jersey state department of treasury and the IRS.

An immigration court ruled in October 2018 that Joe Giudice, who never obtained U.S. citizenship despite living in the country most of his life, was to be deported back to Italy when he finished his prison sentence. In March 2019, he completed his 41-month sentence at Allenwood Federal Prison in Allenwood, Pennsylvania, and was transferred to a federal facility in western Pennsylvania that houses immigration detainees. In October 2019, Giudice voluntarily returned to Italy to await a decision on the appeal of his deportation case rather than remain in federal custody. In April 2020, Giudice's third appeal was denied. He moved to the Bahamas in 2020 and works in the construction industry.

== Filmography ==
Film and television roles
Year	Title	Role	Notes
1997	Donnie Brasco	Shocked Stripper	Film; uncredited
2009	Mercy	Housewife #2	Episode: "I'm Not That Kind of Girl"
2009–present	The Real Housewives of New Jersey	Herself	251 episodes
2010	Who Wants to Be a Millionaire	Herself	Celebrity Player; 4 episodes
2010	The Fashion Show	Herself	Episode: "Real to Genteel"
2012	Celebrity Apprentice	Herself	Contestant; 14 episodes
2015	Teresa Checks In	Herself	3 episodes
2021, 2026	The Real Housewives Ultimate Girls Trip	Herself	Main cast; Seasons 1 & 5
2022	Good Morning America	Herself	Guest
2022	Dancing with the Stars	Herself	Contestant (Season 31)
2022	Fuhgeddabout Christmas	Herself	VH1 Christmas Movie
2024	House of Villains	Herself	Contestant; Season 2
2025	Special Forces: World's Toughest Test	Herself	Contestant; Season 4

== Bibliography ==
- Giudice, Teresa; MacLean, Heather; Fink, Ben (Photographer) (April 16, 2010). Skinny Italian: Eat It and Enjoy It? Live La Bella Vita and Look Great, Too! (paperback ed.). Hachette Books. ASIN B003HG5RAM.
- Giudice, Teresa; MacLean, Heather (May 3, 2011). Fabulicious!: Teresa's Italian Family Cookbook (paperback ed.). Running Press. ISBN 978-0-7624-4239-3.
- Giudice, Teresa; MacLean, Heather (May 8, 2012). Fabulicious!: Fast & Fit: Teresa's Low-Fat, Super-Easy Italian Recipes (Original ed.). Running Press. ISBN 978-0-7624-4544-8.
- Giudice, Teresa; MacLean, Heather (May 7, 2013). Fabulicious!: On the Grill: Teresa's Smoking Hot Backyard Recipes (paperback ed.). Running Press. ISBN 978-0-7624-4977-4.
- Giudice, Teresa; Baker, K.C. (February 9, 2016). Turning the Tables: From Housewife to Inmate and Back Again (Hardcover ed.). Teresa Giudice (1000). ASIN B01FMW5SF2.
- Giudice, Teresa (October 3, 2017). Standing Strong. Gallery Books. ISBN 978-1-5011-7919-8.
