= James "Pate" Philip =

American politician (1930–2023)

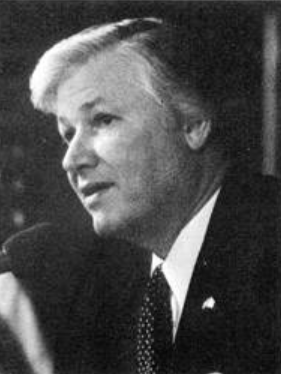
- Philip circa. 1981

President of the Illinois Senate
- In office January 1993 – January 2003
- Preceded by: Philip J. Rock
- Succeeded by: Emil Jones Jr.

Member of the Illinois Senate from the 23rd district 40th district (1975–1983)
- In office January 1975 – January 2003
- Preceded by: Jack T. Knuepfer
- Succeeded by: Ray Soden

Personal details
- Born: May 26, 1930 Elmhurst, Illinois, U.S.
- Died: November 21, 2023 (aged 93) Wood Dale, Illinois, U.S.
- Party: Republican
- Spouse: Nancy Philip
- Children: 4
- Education: Kansas State College

Military service
- Allegiance: United States
- Branch/service: (United States Marine Corps) Marine Corps
- Years of service: 1950–1953

James Peyton "Pate" Philip (May 26, 1930 – November 21, 2023) was an American politician. A longtime Republican member of the Illinois General Assembly, Philip served both the Illinois House of Representatives and the Illinois Senate including a decade as the President of the Illinois Senate. He was known as a highly influential politician, both for the projects that he passed and blocked in state government and for his often blunt comments.

Richard S. Williamson, the White House chief of intergovernmental affairs under Ronald Reagan, deemed him "one of the most important Republicans in the Midwest".

== Early life and career ==
James Peyton Philip was born on May 26, 1930, in Elmhurst, Illinois. He attended York Community High School, Kansas City Junior College, and Kansas State College. Philip was drafted into the United States Marine Corps at the onset of the Korean War, though he was not deployed overseas. He was a district sales manager for Pepperidge Farm for 38 years and retired in 1992.

== Early political career ==
Philip was elected York Township Auditor in 1965 and was elected President of the Illinois Young Republicans the same year.

== Illinois House ==
In 1965, the Illinois Supreme Court resolved a longstanding reapportionment issue and Philip opted to run for the Illinois House in the 37th district. The 37th district consisted of York, Addison, Bloomingdale and Wayne townships along with the City of West Chicago in Winfield Township. He was elected as one of the district's three representatives with Gene L. Hoffman and Bill Redmond. During his first term, he was assigned to the Committees on Conservation, Fish and Game; Executive; Industry and Labor Relations. Republican Lee A. Daniels succeeded Philip as one of three House members from the 40th district as Republican Gene Hoffman and Democrat Bill Redmond were reelected.

== Illinois Senate ==
In 1974, Republican incumbent Jack T. Knuepfer chose to retire from the Illinois Senate. Philip defeated John L. Benzin, a former member of the DuPage County Board of Tax Review, in the Republican primary. In the general election, Philip faced Democratic candidate Bud Loftus. In the aftermath of the Watergate scandal, Philip won 22,318 votes to Loftus's 20,984 votes; a slim 3.08% margin in then-staunchly Republican DuPage County.

Philip was chosen as the Illinois Senate Minority Leader in 1981 after the death of Dr. David C. Shapiro. Philip had been the assistant minority leader since 1979. In January 1993, after the Republicans gained a majority in the Illinois Senate, he was elected as President of the Illinois Senate and remained in that role until 2003 when Democrats became the majority. He retired shortly after his unopposed reelection and was replaced by Ray Soden.

=== Senate District ===
The 40th district to which Philip was elected was in northeastern DuPage County which would be the center of Philip's various constituencies during his Senate career. In the 1981 reapportionment, the 40th district was renumbered the 23rd district and included all of Addison Township and portions of York, Milton, Winfield, Bloomingdale, and Schaumburg townships. This map, drawn by Democrats, forced Philip to move from Elmhurst to Wood Dale. After Republicans won map-making power in 1991, the 23rd district included all of Addison Township, O'Hare International Airport, and portions of York Township in DuPage County and Schaumburg and Leyden townships in Cook County. In the 2001 decennial apportionment, the 23rd district lost its portions that were in Cook County and included all or parts of the localities of Bloomingdale, Roselle, Glendale Heights, Carol Stream, Glen Ellyn, Itasca, Addison, Wheaton, Winfield, Bensenville, Wood Dale, Elmhurst, Villa Park, and Lombard.

== Political positions ==
=== Chicago school reform ===
Philip's oft-repeated pronouncements that giving more money to the Chicago public school systems would be like "pouring money down a rat-hole" helped provide the impetus for what Philip said was one of his most important accomplishments—instituting a series of reforms that removed power from school boards rife with corruption. The major beneficiary of these reforms was Chicago mayor Richard M. Daley, who with chief executive officer of Schools Paul Vallas removed previous money-wasting reformers from their posts and closed a $1.4 billion deficit over four years without the need to request more state funding. The legislative reforms also challenged the long-standing assertion from Philip's opponents (notably, the Chicago Teachers Union) that Philip harbored a strong dislike for Chicago and its school system.

=== Lake Calumet Airport ===
In 1990, Mayor Richard M. Daley, announced his proposal for the Lake Calumet Airport, which would have resulted in the demolition of all of Hegewisch, along with portions of Burnham and Calumet City. The airport faced staunch opposition from Hegewisch residents. Philip opposed the Lake Calumet Airport, believing an airport in Peotone, then regarded as an alternate site, would be better suited for an airport. He also opposed the state government paying $2 billion of the airport's costs. In the face of this opposition, Daley declared the airport proposal "dead" and focused on plans to expand O'Hare International Airport.

=== Criminal Justice ===
Philip's legislative stances on crime were mixed. With backing from the gun lobby representing downstate hunters, Philip fought to reduce the penalty for illegal possession of firearms to a misdemeanor. However, he also fought to expand the death penalty to apply to all convicted murderers. The proposed legislation he endorsed also proposed mandatory 10–year prison sentences with no chance of parole for using firearms in a "safe retail zone", defined as shopping malls, strip malls and commercial districts with more than three stores. Philip expressed a preference for expanding this portion of the law to all gun-related crimes, not just safe retail zones. State's attorneys in the six-county Chicago metropolitan area agreed with Philip's stance on gun crimes, but were mixed with regards to changes in the death penalty.

=== DuPage Tollway ===
In June 1984, Philip, then the Republican minority leader of the Illinois Senate, helped push through legislation authorizing the construction of a tollway, Interstate 355, then referred to as simply the DuPage Tollway.

== Controversy ==
Philip was also known for making numerous controversial comments on various topics throughout his career. Many, including former Illinois gubernatorial candidate Dawn Clark Netsch, labeled him as both holding and vocally expressing racial prejudice. However, Philip himself said that he was not racist, saying "When you criticize minorities, whether you're right or wrong, their reaction is it's a racist remark."

During the corruption trial of former Gov. George Ryan's top aide Scott Fawell, "Pate" Philip was called as a witness. Prosecutors asked about Philip's 50-year high school reunion—a 1999 $15,000 bash at Navy Pier set up by Scott Fawell. Philip said he never asked for any special treatment, but was happily surprised by it. It was only after the Chicago Sun-Times revealed the party that Philip paid for it out of his campaign fund.

You had a freebie didn't you?", asked prosecutor Pat Collins. "It would appear that way," said Philip.

Also during the trial, prosecutors released a document including ten pages of favors granted to former Senate President Pate Philip.

Philip spoke with Larry Hall, who wore a hidden recorder and taped the conversations as a part of an undercover government investigation. Philip agreed to try to get Hall's sister a job with the secretary of state's office in exchange for Hall's fundraising activities. Prosecutors allege Hall gave $1,400 to Philip's campaign shortly after the conversation.

Philip was criticized for looking into the voter histories of students applying for legislative scholarships, which are funded by the taxpayers of Illinois. In 2001, all five of Philip's scholarships went to Republican primary voters or to students whose parents voted Republican, and the same trend was observed over the prior five years.

Philip, with backing from the gun lobby, fought to reduce the penalty for illegal possession of firearms to a misdemeanor.

== Electoral history ==
- 2002 Race for Illinois Senate — 23rd district
  - Unopposed
- 1998 Race for Illinois Senate — 23rd district
  - James "Pate" Philip (R), 31,347
  - Rita Gonzalez (D), 13,961
- 1994 Race for Illinois Senate — 23rd district
  - James "Pate" Philip (R), 29,452
  - Keith Petropoulos (D), 13,100
- 1990 Race for Illinois Senate — 23rd district
  - Defeated William C. Kaiser (D)

== Personal life ==
Philip was married to Nancy and they had four children. James "Pate" Philip State Park, located in DuPage County, is named after Philip.

Philip received a heart bypass at Elmhurst Memorial Hospital in June 2004. Philip's stepson Randy Ramey was appointed to the Illinois House in 2005.

On November 21, 2023, Philip died at his home in Wood Dale, Illinois, at the age of 93.

Illinois House of Representatives
Preceded by At-large district abolished	Member of the Illinois House of Representatives from the 37th district 1967–1973; Served alongside: Gene L. Hoffman, William A. Redmond	Succeeded by Tobias Barry; Kenneth W. Miller; Joseph B. Ebbesen
Preceded by Joseph Fennessey; Carl T. Hunsicker; Carl W. Soderstrom	Member of the Illinois House of Representatives from the 40th district 1973–1975; Served alongside: Gene L. Hoffman, William A. Redmond	Succeeded by Lee A. Daniels
Illinois Senate
Preceded by Jack T. Knuepfer	Member of the Illinois Senate from the 40th district 1975–1983	Succeeded by Aldo DeAngelis
Preceded by Timothy F. Degnan	Member of the Illinois Senate from the 23rd district 1983–2003	Succeeded by Ray Soden
Preceded by David C. Shapiro	Minority Leader of the Illinois Senate; 1981–1993	Succeeded by Emil Jones
Political offices
Preceded by Philip J. Rock	President of the Illinois Senate; 1993–2003	Succeeded by Emil Jones
