= Gene L. Hoffman =

American educator and politician

Gene L. Hoffman (September 26, 1932 – December 28, 2007) was an American educator and politician.

Born on a farm near Canton, Illinois, Hoffman served in the United States Army. He received his bachelor's degree from Illinois State University and his master's and doctorate degrees from Northern Illinois University. He lived in Elmhurst, Illinois and taught social studies at Fenton High School in Bensenville, Illinois. From 1967 to 1991, Hoffman served in the Illinois House of Representatives and was a Republican. Hoffman died from Alzheimer's disease at Garden Terrace in Aurora, Colorado.

== Notes ==
Illinois House of Representatives
Preceded by At-large district abolished	Member of the Illinois House of Representatives from the 37th district 1967–1973; Served alongside: James Philip (1967–1973), William A. Redmond (1967–1973)	Succeeded by Tobias Barry; Kenneth W. Miller; Joseph B. Ebbesen
Preceded by Joseph Fennessey; Carl T. Hunsicker; Carl W. Soderstrom	Member of the Illinois House of Representatives from the 40th district 1973–1991; Served alongside: James Philip (1973–1975), William A. Redmond (1973–1981), Lee A. Daniels (1975–1983), Hubert J. Loftus (1982–1983)	Succeeded by Dan Cronin
