= Tom Cullerton =

American politician

Member of the Illinois Senate from the 23rd district
- In office January 9, 2013 – February 23, 2022
- Preceded by: Carole Pankau
- Succeeded by: Diane Pappas

Village President of Villa Park
- In office May 2009 – May 2013
- Preceded by: Joyce Stupegia
- Succeeded by: Deborah Bullwinkel

Personal details
- Born: September 20, 1969 (age 57) Evanston, Illinois
- Party: Democratic
- Education: University of Kansas
- Profession: Chief Public Affairs Officer Strategia Consulting

Military service
- Allegiance: United States
- Branch/service: United States Army
- Years of service: 1990–1993

Thomas E. Cullerton is an American politician and lobbyist. Cullerton was a member of the Illinois Senate representing the 23rd district from 2013 until resigning in 2022. During his tenure, the 23rd district spanned northern DuPage County and included all or parts of Addison, Bloomingdale, Bartlett, Carol Stream, Glendale Heights, Hanover Park, Itasca, Roselle, Villa Park, West Chicago, Wayne, Wood Dale and Medinah. Prior to his service in the Illinois Senate he was the Village President of Villa Park from 2009 to 2013 and served one term as a village trustee from 2005 to 2009.

== Early and personal life ==
After graduating high school from Loyola Academy Cullerton went to the University of Kansas. In 1990 Cullerton enlisted in the US Army and served as an 11H TOW Gunner until being honorably discharged in 1993. After moving to DuPage County, Cullerton decided to become active in the community. He formed and served as a captain a local neighborhood watch. He also became a member of the Knights of Columbus, the American Legion, and coaches little league with his team winning the 2011 Farm League World Series.

He is married to his wife, Stacey, and they have three sons. A distant cousin, John Cullerton, served as President of the Senate.

== Village President of Villa Park ==
In 2005 Tom Cullerton was elected a trustee for Villa Park. He served one term before defeating incumbent Joyce Stupegia in a three-way race to become Village President in 2009. While in office he was an active member of the DuPage Mayors & Managers Conference and the Metropolitan Mayors. While Village President, the other mayors from municipalities in DuPage County Board District 2 elected him to serve as their representative on the DuPage Water Commission. Later that year, Cullerton was recognized by the Sierra Club for reducing the village's carbon footprint via Cool Cities. In the 2013 municipal elections, Cullerton was succeeded as Village President by Deb Bullwinkle.

== Illinois Senate ==
=== Election ===
In November 2011 Tom Cullerton announced his candidacy for state senate in the newly redrawn 23rd district. In the March 2012 primary he won the Democratic nomination defeating two perennial candidates. In the general election he faced incumbent State Senator Carole Pankau, the winner of the Republican nomination against State Representative Randy Ramey. Cullerton was endorsed by the Illinois AFL–CIO, Personal PAC, Planned Parenthood, Equality Illinois and the Illinois Sierra Club. Tom Cullerton won the general election defeating 20 year Springfield incumbent Senator Pankau by a margin of a little over 2,000 votes to become the first Democratic member of the Illinois Senate from DuPage County.

=== Tenure ===
Senator Cullerton was first sworn in to represent the 23rd district on January 9, 2013. At the beginning of the General Assembly, Senator Cullerton joined a bipartisan group of lawmakers who turned down a pension as part of the effort to fix the state's pension system. In January 2013, Senator Cullerton proposed his first bill which would allow county boards to more easily reduce crime in residential areas by adopting crime free rental housing ordinances.

==== Government consolidation ====
In 2012, DuPage County performed a review that found a variety of small units of government that provide mosquito abatement, sanitary and street lighting services cost taxpayers $300 million annually. These districts included small entities such as the one square mile Century Hill Street Lighting District whose board members had wanted to dissolve the district, but were unable to.

In response, Cullerton introduced SB 494 as a pilot program to allow for consolidation of these types of government bodies. The bill would allow the DuPage County Board to pass ordinances to dissolve thirteen small units of government after an audit issued by the County Board Chair was completed. The dissolution of a district could to be overturned via referendum by voters in that district. The bill’s cosponsors included suburban legislators and it was supported by Republican County Board Chair Dan Cronin. On April 25, the bill was passed unanimously in the Illinois Senate and on May 6, its house counterpart sponsored by Deb Conroy passed the Illinois House of Representatives with 108 yes votes. The bill was signed into law by Pat Quinn in August. Since then, DuPage County has been able to pass an ordinance to dissolve the Fairview Fire Protection District.

In 2015, Representative Jack Franks a co-sponsor of SB 494 proposed legislation to give McHenry and Lake counties the same ability to consolidate small, special purpose districts.

==== Education ====
Concerned that Illinois had some of the weakest civic education programs in the country, Cullerton and State Representative Deb Conroy proposed the creation of the Task Force on Civic Education. The commission recommended Illinois establish a requirement for a civics course as a part of a broader revision of the state's social studies standards, that the state establish a project-based and/or service learning requirement, student involvement in elections and professional development for teachers who teach civics.

After the task force released its findings, Cullerton introduced a bill which would put the task force's recommendations into place. The bill passed the Senate with 46 votes and passed the House with 81 votes. The McCormick Foundation and other non-profit organizations pledged $3 million to cover the costs of civics education training for teachers in poorer school districts. The bill was signed into law by Bruce Rauner on August 21, 2015 to take effect during the 2016–2017 school year.

Citing the rising costs associated with a college education, Cullerton served as the co-sponsor of a bill that would allow students who achieve at least a 3 on an AP test to receive post-secondary level course credit at public colleges and universities. This would make Illinois competitive with neighboring states who have that policy. The colleges themselves would be allowed to decide the number of credits granted for a particular score.

==== Anti-heroin legislation ====
DuPage County, the bulk of Cullerton’s district, has seen an increase in heroin use in the county. This was accompanied by an epidemic of overdoses and at one point the county was averaging one overdose death per week. In 2014, DuPage County began to train officers in the use of Narcan, a medication that reverses the effect of opioids like heroin in overdoses. Since the start of the program, 25 overdose deaths have been prevented through the use of Narcan by first responders.

In 2015, Cullerton served as Chief Co-sponsor of SB 10 which would amend the Alcoholism and Other Drug Abuse and Dependency Act to allow local law enforcement to the list of entities that may apply for grants to create or support local drug overdose prevention, recognition, and response projects including grants for training in the use of narcan to stop overdoses. In September, Cullerton voted to override Bruce Rauner's veto of the Heroin Crisis Act.

==== Crowdfunding ====
Cullerton served as the Chief Senate Sponsor for HB 3429. HB 3429 would create an intrastate exemption for crowdfunding. Under the bill nonaccredited investors who meet certain income criteria would be able to invest $5,000 per company per year. The bill was signed into law by Governor Rauner on July 29, 2015 to take effect January 1, 2016.

==== Veterans affairs ====
In 2014, citing an increase in suicide among U.S. military veterans Cullerton sponsored legislation to create the Illinois Veteran Suicide Task Force. The task force is charged with investigating the causes of veteran suicide and forming policy recommendations for the Illinois General Assembly to act on. Cullerton, a veteran of the United States Army, was appointed to the task force. In 2018, Cullerton was appointed to Governor-elect J. B. Pritzker's transition committee on Veterans Affairs.

=== Committee assignments ===
During the 100th General Assembly, Cullerton is assigned to the following committees: Agriculture; Committee of the Whole; Higher Education; Labor; State Government (Vice-Chairperson); Telecommunications & InfoTechnology; Veterans Affairs (Chairperson); Pub. High. Ed. Adm. Cost. Tui. Fees; Sub. on Compensation and Benefits.

In the 99th General Assembly, Cullerton was a member of the following committees: Appropriations II, Labor, State Government & Veterans Affairs, Transportation, Energy and Public Utilities and the Committee of the Whole. He also served as Vice-Chairperson of the Local Government committee.

=== Embezzlement charges and conviction ===
On August 2, 2019, Cullerton was indicted by federal authorities on one count of conspiracy to embezzle from a labor union and 39 counts of embezzlement from a labor union. Cullerton is a member of the International Brotherhood of Teamsters. Shortly after his election, Cullerton was hired by union official John T. Coli as a labor organizer for Teamsters Joint Council 25, a position which, according to the indictment, allowed him to collect a full salary and benefits despite performing little or no work for the union. Cullerton resigned his seat in the Illinois Senate on February 23, 2022, the same day he announced his intent to plead guilty to 1 count of embezzlement.

In June 2022, Cullerton was sentenced to 366 days in prison for embezzlement. In April 2023, he could get an early release from prison after serving about seven months of his sentence.

== Electoral history ==
2018 General Election Results- Illinois's 23rd Senate District
Party	Candidate	Votes	%
Democratic	Tom Cullerton	39,604	54.9
Republican	Seth Lewis	32,582	45.1
Democratic hold			

On November 8, 2016, Cullerton won re-election against Republican Seth Lewis.

2016 General Election Results- Illinois's 23rd Senate District
Party	Candidate	Votes	%
Democratic	Tom Cullerton	44,643	50.7
Republican	Seth Lewis	43,429	49.3
Democratic hold			

Illinois State Senate 23rd District General Election, 2012
Party	Candidate	Votes	%
Democratic	Tom Cullerton	39,025	51.33
Republican	Carole Pankau (incumbent)	37,008	48.67
Democratic gain from Republican			

Illinois State Senate District 23 Democratic Primary, 2012
Party	Candidate	Votes	%
Democratic	Tom Cullerton	3,130	40.76
Democratic	Kevin Allen	2,344	30.52
Democratic	Greg Brownfield	2,206	28.72
Total votes		7,680	100

Village President of Villa Park election, 2009
Party	Candidate	Votes	%
Independent	Thomas Cullerton	1,872	53.81
Independent	Albert Bulthuis	1,133	32.57
Independent	Joyce Stupegia (incumbent)	474	13.62
Total votes		3,479	100

== See also ==
- Illinois Senate
- Illinois Senate elections, 2012
