= William A. Redmond =

American politician (1908–1992)

Bill Redmond

64th Speaker of the Illinois House of Representatives
- In office January 1975 – January 1981
- Preceded by: W. Robert Blair
- Succeeded by: George Ryan

Member of the Illinois House of Representatives from the 40th district 37th district (1966-73) At large (1964-66) 36th district (1959-64)
- In office January 1959 – December 1981
- Preceded by: Fred W. Anderson
- Succeeded by: Hubert J. Loftus

Personal details
- Born: November 25, 1908 Chicago, Illinois
- Died: December 11, 1992 (aged 84) Elmhurst, Illinois
- Party: Democratic
- Spouse: Rita Riordan
- Children: Two Daughters, One Son
- Education: Marquette University (B.E.); Northwestern University (J.D.)
- Profession: Attorney

Military service
- Allegiance: United States of America
- Branch/service: United States Navy
- Years of service: 1942-1946
- Rank: Lieutenant Commander
- Unit: U.S. Naval Intelligence

William Aloysius Redmond (1908–1992) was a member of the Illinois House of Representatives representing portions of DuPage County from 1959 until his retirement in 1981. During the 79th, 80th and 81st general assemblies, he served as Speaker of the House.

== Early life and career ==
Bill Redmond was born in Chicago on November 25, 1908. At the age of 5, he became a child model on the packages of Little Sun Maid Raisins.

After graduating high school, he attended Marquette University where he earned a bachelor of engineering. He also played football, wrestled and played baseball for Marquette. In 1934, he graduated from Northwestern University's School of Law where he was a member of the Young Democrats.

His first job out of college was at the firm of Loesch, Scofield, Loesch and Burke. He continued there until he entered the United States Navy as a Lieutenant, junior grade at the outbreak of World War II. He served in Naval Intelligence and as a Naval Security officer. He was honorably discharged in 1946 with the rank of lieutenant commander.

After the war, he returned to practicing law and became the first attorney in Bensenville, Illinois. His experiences during the Great Depression having made him a staunch Democrat, he became involved in the small Democratic Party of largely Republican DuPage County, eventually becoming its chairman in 1968. In 1948, after encouragement from Paul Douglas and Adlai Stevenson he ran for DuPage County State's Attorney and received the highest vote total of anyone up to that time, but lost. He made his second run for office in 1950 when he ran for county judge.

== Illinois General Assembly ==
In his third run for office, Redmond won a seat in the Illinois House's 36th district, which included all of DuPage County. He was one of the 36th district's three representatives (along with John N. Erlenborn and Lee E. Daniels) in the Illinois House. He succeeded Democrat Fred W. Anderson of Downers Grove.

The 1960 reapportionment process was stalled by partisan gridlock. Subsequently, the Illinois Supreme Court ordered an at large election for all 177 members of the Illinois House in 1964. Voters were given ballots three feet long. After a 1965 Illinois Supreme Court Case to resolve the redistricting issue, Redmond's home was drawn into the 37th district which consisted of York, Addison, Bloomingdale and Wayne townships along with the City of West Chicago in Winfield Township. He was reelected as one of the district's three representatives with Gene L. Hoffman and Pate Philip.

He sponsored many pieces of legislation during his tenure including the creation of an Equality of Economic Opportunity Commission, created the Illinois State Board of Education, and advocated for increased mass transportation for his suburban district. He helped to create the South Suburban Transit Authority and the Regional Transportation Authority.

=== 1975 Speaker election ===
In 1975, Mayor Richard J. Daley supported Democratic leader Clyde L. Choate of Anna. Governor Dan Walker objected to Choate for personal reasons and supported Gerald A. Bradley of Bloomington. J. Glenn Schneider of Naperville, a legislator from Redmond's DuPage County, had reservations about a Choate speakership. He drafted Redmond to run for Speaker. No candidate, which at various points in time included up to eleven Democrats and the Republican leader James R. Washburn could get the 89 votes required to be elected Speaker.

After days of ballots, Daley and Walker finally chose Redmond as a compromise candidate as he was the only candidate no one could object to who had the experience to preside over the House. Choate refused to drop out and, with a small group of Democrats, held out against Redmond as the Democratic compromise choice. Over a week after the election for Speaker began; newly elected Republican Lee A. Daniels crossed party lines to vote for Redmond. After Daniels vote, a weekend recess was called. On Monday, Daniels and a small group of Republicans cast their votes for Redmond. This block included five Chicagoans, Daniels and Gene A. Hoffman; the latter two of whom were from Redmond's district.

=== Speaker of the House ===
Redmond became a respected legislator on both sides of the aisle and during the 79th General Assembly; he was elected Speaker of the House as a compromise candidate. His election was made possible by the defection of freshman representative and future speaker Lee A. Daniels from his party.

As Speaker, he took a hands off approach with legislation and toured areas of downstate Illinois that may have otherwise not met anyone from the Democratic leadership. He became the first Democrat to be elected Speaker for three terms.

In December 1981, Redmond chose to retire after twenty four years in the Illinois House. Longtime Democratic activist and attorney Hubert J. "Bud" Loftus of Addison was appointed to replace him.

== Post assembly life and legacy ==
After stepping down from the legislature, Redmond was appointed to the Illinois Prison Review Board by Governor James R. Thompson. Redmond retired from the practice of law in 1986. In April 1992, he stepped down as the longtime chair of the DuPage County Democratic Party. He died in December of that year. The Redmond Recreational Complex in his hometown of Bensenville is named after him.
