= 1996 Illinois elections =

- November 5, 1996
- Turnout: 66.30%

Elections were held in Illinois on November 5, 1996.

Primaries were held March 19, 1996.

== Election information ==
=== Turnout ===
For the primaries, turnout was 29.46%, with 1,804,626 ballots cast (with 902,635 Democratic ballots, 868,030 Republican ballots, 1,993 Libertarian, 498 Harold Washington, and 31,470 nonpartisan ballots cast).

For the general election, turnout was 66.30%, with 4,418,270 ballots cast.

=== Straight-ticket voting ===
Illinois had a straight-ticket voting option in 1996. This would be the last Illinois election with straight-ticket voting, as it would be abolished in Illinois in 1997.

Party	Number of straight-ticket votes
Democratic	946,889
Republican	744,122
Harold Washington Party	2,062
Libertarian	3,757
Natural Law	524
Reform	14,374
U.S. Taxpayers'	474

== Federal elections ==
=== United States President ===
Illinois voted for the Democratic Party ticket of Bill Clinton and Al Gore.

=== United States Senate ===
Democrat Dick Durbin was elected to succeed outgoing Democratic Senator Paul Simon.

=== United States House ===
All 20 of Illinois’ seats in the United States House of Representatives were up for election in 1996.

Both the Democratic and Republican parties flipped one seat held by the other party, leaving the party the composition of Illinois' House delegation 10 Democrats and 10 Republicans.

== State elections ==
=== State Senate ===
1996 Illinois Senate election
- November 5, 1996

40 of 59 seats in the Illinois Senate 30 seats needed for a majority
	Majority party	Minority party
Party	Republican	Democratic
Last election	33	26
Seats won	31	28
Seat change	▼2	▲2
- Results: Democratic gain Republican hold Democratic hold No election
President before election
James Philip
Republican
Elected President
James Philip
Republican

40 out of 59 seats in the Illinois Senate were up for election in 1996. Republicans retained control of the Illinois Senate, which they had held since 1993, having secured a majority from the 1992 election.

=== State House of Representatives ===
1996 Illinois House of Representatives election
- November 5, 1996

All 118 seats in the Illinois House of Representatives 60 seats needed for a majority
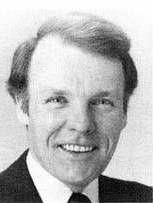

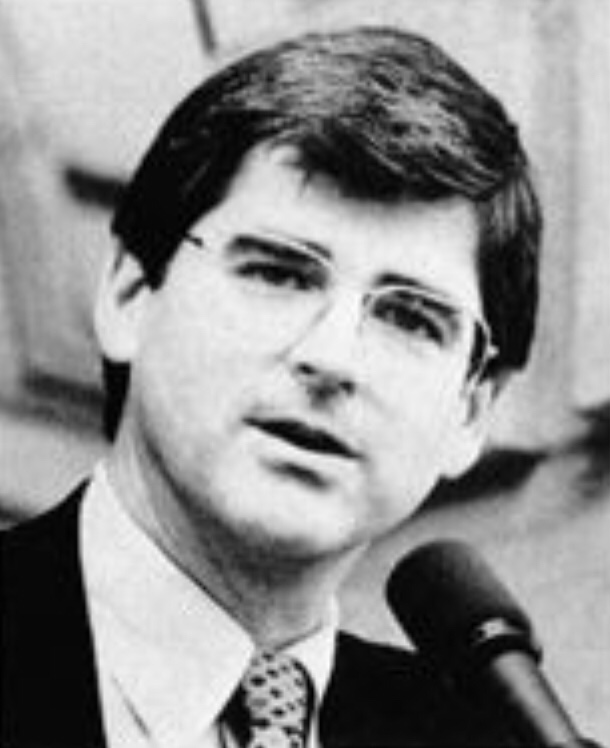
	Majority party	Minority party
Leader	Michael Madigan	Lee Daniels
Party	Democratic	Republican
Leader's seat	22nd	46th
Last election	54	64
Seats won	60	58
Seat change	▲6	▼6
- Results: Democratic gain Democratic hold Republican hold
Speaker before election
Lee Daniels
Republican
Speaker-Elect
Michael Madigan
Democratic

All of the seats in the Illinois House of Representatives were up for election in 1996. Democrats flipped control of the Illinois House of Representatives, which had been held by Republicans since 1995 after they had won a majority in the 1994 election.

=== Judicial elections ===
Judicial elections were held.

== Local elections ==
Local elections were held. These included county elections, such as the Cook County elections.
