= Wood Dale, Illinois =

Wood Dale Wood Dale, IL
- City
- City of Wood Dale
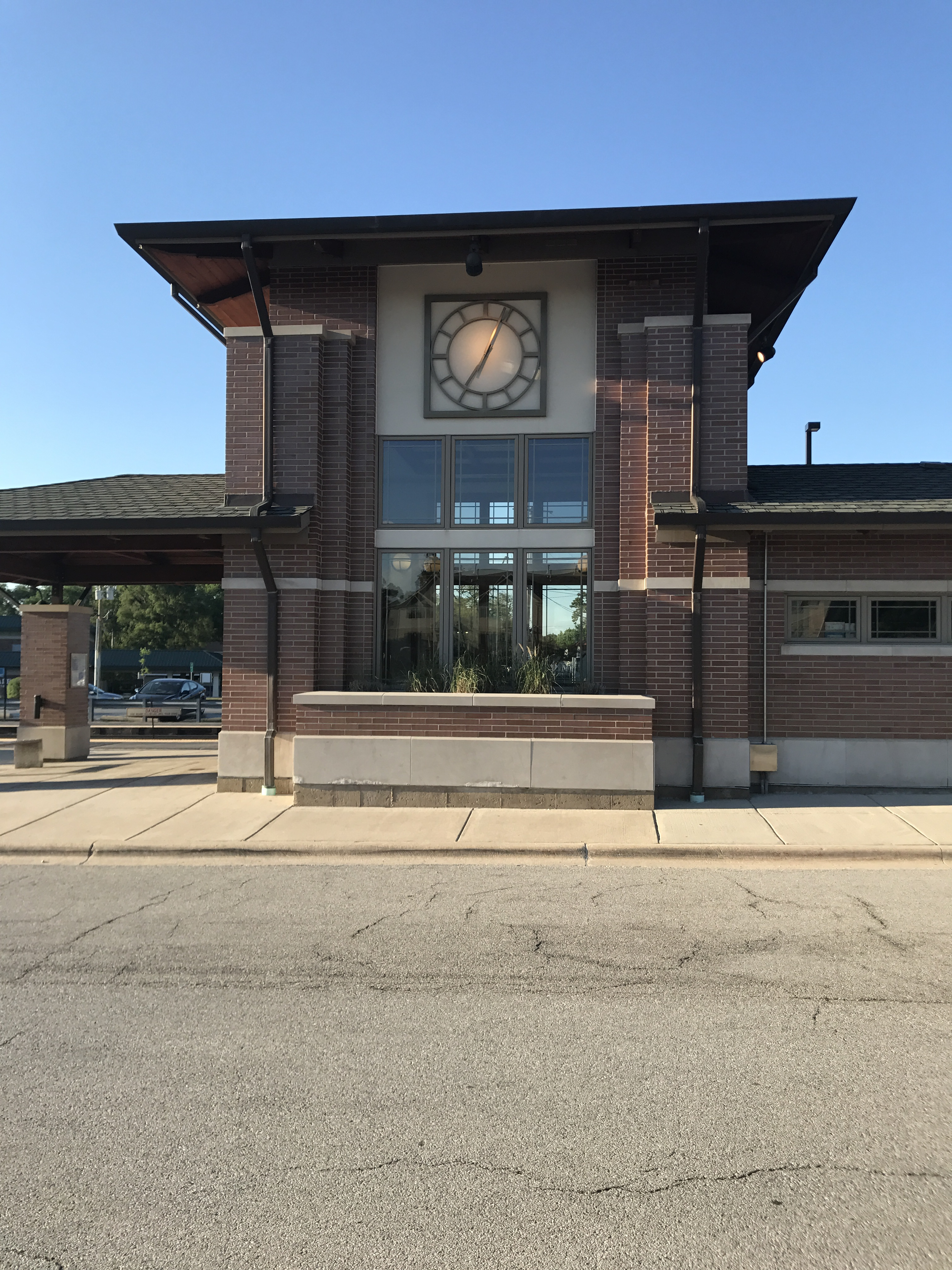
- Wood Dale Metra Station

- Seal
- Motto: Working Together to Make Life Better
- Location of Wood Dale in DuPage County, Illinois.

- Location of Illinois in the United States
- Coordinates: 41°57′47″N 87°58′42″W
- Country: United States
- State: Illinois
- County: DuPage
- Township: Addison
- Founded: 1928

Government
  - Type: Council-manager
  - Mayor: Nunzio Pulice

Area
  - Total: 4.85 sq mi (12.55 km^{2})
  - Land: 4.75 sq mi (12.29 km^{2})
  - Water: 0.10 sq mi (0.26 km^{2})
- Elevation: 686 ft (209 m)

Population (2020)
  - Total: 14,012
  - Density: 2,953.7/sq mi (1,140.44/km^{2})
- Time zone: UTC-6 (CST)
  - Summer (DST): UTC-5 (CDT)
- ZIP Code(s): 60191
- Area code: 630
- FIPS code: 17-82985
- GNIS feature ID: 2397360
- Website: http://www.wooddale.com

Wood Dale is a city in Addison Township, DuPage County, Illinois, United States. Per the 2020 census, the population was 14,012.

== History ==
Wood Dale was originally known as Lester's Station, after John Lester, an early settler.

== Geography ==
According to the 2021 census gazetteer files, Wood Dale has a total area of 4.89 square miles (12.67 km^{2}), of which 4.78 square miles (12.38 km^{2}) (or 97.91%) is land and 0.10 square miles (0.26 km^{2}) (or 2.09%) is water.

Wood Dale shares borders with Elk Grove Village (on the north), Bensenville (east), Addison (south, southwest) and Itasca (west).

== Demographics ==
Historical population
Census	Pop.	Note	%±
1930	230		—
1940	738		220.9%
1950	1,857		151.6%
1960	3,071		65.4%
1970	8,831		187.6%
1980	11,251		27.4%
1990	12,425		10.4%
2000	13,535		8.9%
2010	13,770		1.7%
2020	14,012		1.8%
U.S. Decennial Census; 2010 2020

=== Racial and ethnic composition ===
Wood Dale city, Illinois – Racial and ethnic composition Note: the US Census treats Hispanic/Latino as an ethnic category. This table excludes Latinos from the racial categories and assigns them to a separate category. Hispanics/Latinos may be of any race.
Race / Ethnicity (NH = Non-Hispanic)	Pop 2000	Pop 2010	Pop 2020	% 2000	% 2010	% 2020
White alone (NH)	11,048	9,918	8,970	81.63%	72.03%	64.02%
Black or African American alone (NH)	71	158	240	0.52%	1.15%	1.71%
Native American or Alaska Native alone (NH)	10	9	8	0.07%	0.07%	0.06%
Asian alone (NH)	439	721	846	3.24%	5.24%	6.04%
Pacific Islander alone (NH)	7	0	0	0.05%	0.00%	0.00%
Other race alone (NH)	12	11	35	0.09%	0.08%	0.25%
Mixed race or Multiracial (NH)	180	157	268	1.33%	1.14%	1.91%
Hispanic or Latino (any race)	1,768	2,796	3,645	13.06%	20.31%	26.01%
Total	13,535	13,770	14,012	100.00%	100.00%	100.00%

=== 2020 census ===
As of the 2020 census, Wood Dale had a population of 14,012, with 5,402 households, including 3,684 family households.

The median age was 43.7 years. 18.1% of residents were under the age of 18 and 19.7% were 65 years of age or older. For every 100 females, there were 97.0 males, and for every 100 females age 18 and over, there were 96.0 males.

100.0% of residents lived in urban areas, while 0.0% lived in rural areas.

Of households, 27.1% had children under the age of 18 living in them. 51.6% were married-couple households, 16.4% were households with a male householder and no spouse or partner present, and 25.6% were households with a female householder and no spouse or partner present. 24.4% of all households were made up of individuals, and 12.1% had someone living alone who was 65 years of age or older.

The population density was 2,868.37 inhabitants per square mile (1,107.48/km^{2}). There were 5,599 housing units at an average density of 1,146.16 per square mile (442.53/km^{2}). Of all housing units, 3.5% were vacant. The homeowner vacancy rate was 0.9% and the rental vacancy rate was 3.9%.

=== Income ===
The median income for a household in the city was $75,521, and the median income for a family was $88,365. Males had a median income of $46,114 versus $32,100 for females. The per capita income for the city was $36,563. About 5.4% of families and 7.1% of the population were below the poverty line, including 8.7% of those under age 18 and 8.9% of those age 65 or over.

=== Education ===
Wood Dale has two primary schools, Oakbrook Elementary School(k-2) and Westview Elementary School(3–5) , and one middle school, Wood Dale Junior High School(6–8) as well as Holy Ghost. Wood Dale shares Fenton High School with Bensenville.

== Economy ==
The top 5 employing industry sectors in Wood Dale are manufacturing (13.6%), retail trade (11.0%), health care (9.7%), wholesale trade (5.4%) and administration (8.4%). A plurality of the workforce commutes from Chicago, followed by Wood Dale itself, Elk Grove Village and Bensenville. The top 5 employing industry sectors of community residents are wholesale trade (20.3%), manufacturing (18%), manufacturing (11.3%), administration (10.6%) and healthcare (7.5%). The median income for a household in the city was $57,509, and the median income for a family was $62,289. Males had a median income of $45,884 versus $35,247 for females. The per capita income for the city was $25,507. About 2.9% of families and 4.1% of the population were below the poverty line, including 5.9% of those under age 18 and 3.2% of those age 65 or over. At one time Claire's had a distribution facility in Wood Dale. That function is now handled by its Hoffman Estates office.

=== Principal employers ===
According to Wood Dale's 2025 Annual Comprehensive Financial Report, the top employers in the city are:

#	Employer	# of Employees
1	Prime Now LLC	705
2	Quest Diagnostics	550
3	Videojet	479
4	AAR Corp	464
5	Nvenia	273
6	Power Solutions	244
7	Wiegel Tool Works	230
8	Tempco Electric	217
9	Nippon Express	200
10	All Tile, Inc./All Holdings Inc.	150

== Transportation ==
Wood Dale has a station on Metra's Milwaukee District West Line, which provides daily rail service between Elgin, Illinois, and Chicago, Illinois (at Union Station). Illinois Route 390 is in the city's corporate limits near the northern border of the city and has an exit to Wood Dale Road.

== Sister cities ==
- Cefalù, Italy
- (United States) Chicago, Illinois

== Notable people ==
- Colin Brady, American animator and film director, raised in Wood Dale.
- Rick DeLorto (born 1949), American racing driver, born in Wood Dale and was a Wood Dale resident.
- Henry Hyde (1924–2007), Republican member of the United States House of Representatives from 1975 to 2007, resided in Wood Dale.
- Natalie Jaresko (born 1965), Ukraine's Minister of Finance (2014–2016); raised in Wood Dale.
- Monica Pedersen, Chicago designer for HGTV shows Designed to Sell and Dream Home.
- James "Pate" Philip (1930–2023), 36th President of the Illinois Senate (1993–2003); lived in Wood Dale.
- Ray Soden, Illinois state senator; lived in Wood Dale.
- Jim Spivey (born 1960), retired American middle-distance runner and three time Olympian, raised in Wood Dale.
- Christine Winger, Republican member of the Illinois House of Representatives (2015–2019). She served as a member of the Wood Dale City Council prior to serving as State Representative.
