= Lee A. Daniels =

American politician

Lee Daniels
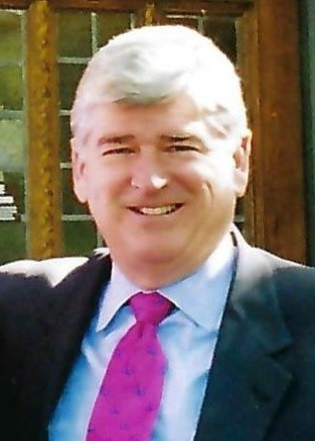
- Daniels in 2004

Chair of the Illinois Republican Party
- In office 2001 – July 2002
- Preceded by: Richard S. Williamson
- Succeeded by: Gary MacDougal

Minority Leader of the Illinois House of Representatives
- In office January 8, 1997 – January 8, 2003
- Preceded by: Michael Madigan
- Succeeded by: Tom Cross
- In office January 5, 1983 – January 11, 1995
- Preceded by: Michael Madigan
- Succeeded by: Michael Madigan

68th Speaker of the Illinois House of Representatives
- In office January 11, 1995 – January 8, 1997
- Preceded by: Michael Madigan
- Succeeded by: Michael Madigan

President of the National Conference of State Legislatures
- In office 1989–1990
- Preceded by: John L. Martin
- Succeeded by: Samuel B. Nunez Jr.

Member of the Illinois House of Representatives from the 46th district
- In office January 1983 – January 2007
- Preceded by: district created
- Succeeded by: Dennis Reboletti

Member of the Illinois House of Representatives from the 40th district
- In office January 1975 – January 1983 Serving with Gene L. Hoffman (R) (1975-1983); Bill Redmond (D) (1975-1981); Hubert J. Loftus (D) (1981-1983)
- Preceded by: Pate Philip
- Succeeded by: District Abolished

Personal details
- Born: Lee Albert Daniels; April 15, 1942 (age 84) Lansing, Michigan, U.S.
- Party: Republican
- Spouse: Pamela Daniels
- Children: 5
- Education: John Marshall Law School; University of Iowa
- Profession: Attorney
- Website: Official website

Lee Albert Daniels (born April 15, 1942) is an American attorney and retired Republican Party politician who served as the Speaker of the Illinois House of Representatives from 1995 to 1997. He represented parts of suburban DuPage County from 1975 to 2007 and led the House Republicans from 1983 to 2003, including nine consecutive terms as Minority Leader. Daniels also chaired the Illinois Republican Party from 2001 until his resignation in 2002 and served as President of the National Conference of State Legislatures from 1989 to 1990.

Daniels first contested in the 1974 elections after winning the primary in March, and was elected as one of the three representatives for the 40th district. He would serve until 1983, when his district was abolished as part of the Cutback Amendment. He ran to represent the 46th district as its sole representative, winning in the 1982 general election. In 1994, the Republicans secured a government trifecta after regaining control of the House. Daniels was subsequently elected Speaker, serving until 1997. After the 1996 elections, Democrats again regained the House, and Daniels stepped down as Speaker. Daniels continued to lead the Republicans in the House, serving as Minority Leader until 2003. Although he resigned as Chair of the Illinois GOP in July 2002, Daniels led his party through the 2002 elections, in which the Republican Party lost 4 seats. Daniels subsequently resigned as Minority Leader, being succeeded by Tom Cross.

Daniels contested in the 2004 elections and won his seat, but ultimately declined to run in 2006; he was succeeded by Republican Dennis Reboletti. After retiring from politics, Daniels has been chairman of the board of directors of Haymarket Center, a nonprofit drug treatment center based primarily in Chicago, since 2014. He also has been involved in academics; "Daniels Hall" of Elmhurst University was named after him.

== Early life ==
Lee Daniels was born April 15, 1942, in Lansing, Michigan to Albert and Evelyn Daniels while they were university students. His grandfather was Lee E. Daniels, was a Republican politician who served as the State's Attorney for DuPage County and as a member of the Illinois House of Representatives. Albert Daniels was a Lieutenant (JG) in the U.S. Navy and served on the USS Frazier DD60 in the Pacific theater during WWII; the elder Daniels earned various awards and citations for his service, culminating in an honorable discharge in 1946. He would go on to serve as Assistant Illinois Attorney General from 1972 to 1985.

Daniels was raised in Elmhurst, Illinois. He is a graduate of the University of Iowa and earned a law degree from John Marshall Law School.

Daniels served for six and a half years on the York Township Board of Auditors.

== Legal career ==
Daniels became authorized to practice law in November 1967. In 1971, William J. Scott appointed Daniels a Special Assistant Attorney General. Daniels would serve in the position until 1974. In his position with Scott's office, Daniels headed the investigation into and civil litigation against Equity Funding. He worked at the firm of Daniels & Faris from 1967 to 1982 and was an equity partner Katten Muchin & Zavis from 1982 to 1981. He retired in 2006 from the Chicago law firm of Bell Boyd & Lloyd, where he was an equity partner.

== Illinois House of Representatives ==
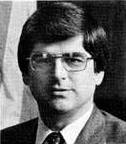
Official portrait, 1985

Daniels was elected to the Illinois House of Representatives in the 1974 general election with Republican incumbent Gene L. Hoffman and Democratic incumbent William A. Redmond as one of three members from the 40th district. That same election, the Democratic Party won control of the Illinois House of Representatives. At the start of the 79th General Assembly, the Democratic caucus was fractured between various legislators for the position of Speaker of the Illinois House of Representatives. Over a week after the election for Speaker began; Daniels crossed party lines on the 89th ballot to vote for his fellow 40th district legislator William A. Redmond, now the Democratic compromise choice, against Democratic holdout Clyde Choate and Republican leader James R. Washburn. After Daniels vote, a weekend recess was called. On Monday, Daniels and a small group of Republicans, including Daniels, cast their votes for Redmond.

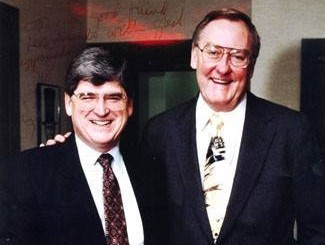
Daniels with Governor Jim Thompson

Daniels served as a member of the Illinois House of Representatives from 1975 to 2007. After the Cutback Amendment abolished multi-member districts and cumulative voting, Daniels ran against Democrat and fellow 40th district incumbent Bud Loftus. Daniels defeated Loftus in the heavily Republican 46th district. Daniels rose through the Republican ranks serving as the Majority Whip during the 82nd General Assembly before becoming the leader of the House Republican Caucus during the 83rd General Assembly. He served as the Republican leader from 1983 to 2003. He was Speaker of the House from 1995 to 1997. From 1989 to 1990 he was the President of the National Conference of State Legislatures.

After Richard Williamson resigned as chair of the Illinois Republican Party to take a position with the United Nations, Daniels, who had previously been Governor George Ryan's pick to lead the Republican Party two years earlier, was selected by the state central committee by a 16-1-1 vote. He served as chairman until July 15, 2002.

== Post-legislative career ==
Daniels serves as a member (2010–present) and chairman (2014-present) of the board of directors of Haymarket Center, a nonprofit drug and alcohol treatment center in Chicago. He recently served as chairman of the College of DuPage Presidential Search Committee (2015-2016). He previously served on the Elmhurst Memorial Healthcare board of trustees, Elmhurst Memorial Healthcare board of governors, and the Elmhurst Memorial Hospital Foundation board. Other boards Daniels has served on include Inland Diversified Real Estate Trust, Inc., the Suburban Bank and Trust Company of Elmhurst board of directors, Elmhurst Federal Savings and Loan Association board of directors, and the DuPage Easter Seals board of directors.

He has received numerous honors, including an honorary Doctorate of Law from Elmhurst College, where he serves as a distinguished fellow. In 2008 Elmhurst College renamed its Computer Science and Technology Center "Daniels Hall."

On September 27, 2011, Senate President John Cullerton appointed Daniels to a two-year term as a public member on the Illinois Advisory Council on Alcoholism and Other Drug Dependency. The sixty member council advises the executive branch on ways to encourage public understanding and support of department programs; proposed rules and licensure; and formulation and implementation of the comprehensive state plan for intervention, prevention, and treatment of alcoholism and other drug abuse and dependency.

== Personal life ==
Daniels is married to Pamela Daniels. They have 5 children and live in Elmhurst, Illinois. Daniels and his wife key in helping constrict the Abraham Lincoln Library and Museum; Daniels helped secure state funds with Governors Jim Edgar and George Ryan while Pamela Daniels served as the first Treasurer of the museum's foundation. Pam Daniels also served on the Illinois Historic Preservation Agency until 2007.

Daniels' father, Albert, died in 2008.

Illinois House of Representatives
Preceded by Pate Philip	Member of the Illinois House of Representatives from the 40th district 1975–1983; Served alongside: Gene L. Hoffman, Bill Redmond, Hubert J. Loftus	Succeeded by Gene L. Hoffman
Preceded by Fred J. Tuerk; Fred J. Schraeder; Don Saltsman	Member of the Illinois House of Representatives from the 46th district 1983–2007	Succeeded by Dennis Reboletti
Preceded by Gerald A. Bradley; Monroe L. Flinn	Majority Whip of the Illinois House of Representatives; 1981–1983; Served alongside: William Benjamin Polk	Succeeded by Peg McDonnell Breslin; Ralph C. Capparelli
Preceded by Michael Madigan	Minority Leader of the Illinois House of Representatives; 1983–1995	Succeeded by Michael Madigan
Preceded by Michael Madigan	Minority Leader of the Illinois House of Representatives; 1997–2003	Succeeded by Tom Cross
Political offices
Preceded by Michael Madigan	Speaker of the Illinois House of Representatives; 1995–1997	Succeeded by Michael Madigan
Party political offices
Preceded by Richard S. Williamson	Chair of the Illinois Republican Party; 2001–2002	Succeeded by Gary MacDougal
