= Market Day Local =

Food cooperative based in Itasca, Illinois

Market Day Local, Inc. (commonly known as Market Day), is a food cooperative based in Itasca, Illinois, that operates in 27 states across the United States. It is known for its school fundraising program.

== History ==
In 1973, Trudi Temple began purchasing flowers wholesale at the Randolph Street Market and reselling them to raise funds for local churches and impoverished communities abroad. She then formed a food cooperative to sell fresh produce. In 1975, Temple began holding the fundraisers at her daughter's school, Walker Elementary School in Clarendon Hills, Illinois. Parents filled out preorder forms and picked up their orders at the school, with a portion of the proceeds going to the school. Later, Temple added meats, seafood, and poultry to the monthly sales, and expanded to other churches, schools, and nonprofit organizations.

By 2000, Market Day Corporation had raised more than $250 million for more than 6,000 schools in 20 metropolitan areas in nine states. The company operated out of corporate headquarters in Itasca, a primary distribution center in Wood Dale, Illinois, and six other warehouses in Atlanta; Burlington, New Jersey; Columbus, Ohio; Dallas; Indianapolis; and Milwaukee. An in-house carrier, Apple Trucking, was part of a nationwide fleet of 175 trucks, many of which were driven by off-duty firefighters. By this time, Market Day had discontinued fresh produce sales; 80% of the inventory was frozen goods. Participating schools received 10–40% of proceeds, depending on the item, and usually relied on parent–teacher association volunteers to operate on-site sales. On September 14, 2000, the first Market Day retail store opened at the company's primary distribution center in Wood Dale, Illinois, with plans for more locations.

In 2013, foodservice distributor Gordon Food Service purchased Market Day Corporation. Market Day items appeared in a dedicated freezer case at GFS Marketplace cash and carry stores. At checkout, customers could designate any participating organization to receive a five-percent give-back from Market Day items or one percent from other store items. GFS shut down the Market Day program in 2015.

In 2019, Theresa Krueger purchased the Market Day brand from GFS to form Market Day Local and began direct home deliveries and pop-up sales. Krueger's Chicago-based Krueger Sausage had been one of Market Day's original vendors.
