= Colin Brady =

American animator and film director

Colin Brady is an American animator and film director. He is a graduate of the California Institute of the Arts (CalArts), has worked as lead animator, animation director, supervising animator and co-director with animated film powerhouses Pixar and Industrial Light & Magic. His credits have included Toy Story, Toy Story 2, A Bug's Life, Men in Black II, Lemony Snicket's A Series of Unfortunate Events, and many others.

A native of Wood Dale, Illinois, Brady graduated from Fenton High School in Bensenville, Illinois. He started studying mechanical engineering at USC but dropped out in favor of CalArts to pursue animation.

After graduating Brady joined Rhythm & Hues Studios worked as animator on Binx the cat in Hocus Pocus.

He later joined Pixar and worked as animator on Toy Story, A Bug's Life and Toy Story 2. Brady directed on Toy Story 2 from July '97 to Jan '99 when the film went from a DVD to theatrical release. Brady also directed on the "Toy Story Animated Storybook" and the Toy Story Activity Center.

On Hulk and Lemony Snicket, Brady and his team pioneered the motion capture of attack dogs and even eight-month-old infants. On Lemony Snicket, Brady helped develop an inexpensive system to reliably track facial motion.

While working at Imagi Studios he was appointed as director for Astro Boy a part originally given to Eric Leighton the director of Dinosaur, but was switched with David Bowers.

In addition, Brady was supervising animator on Men in Black II and E.T. The Extraterrestrial Special Edition. He then worked as director on The Legend of Santa Claus at Lumenas Animation Studios.

Brady supervised at Pixomondo for the "Terra Nova" TV series and on Martin Scorsese's "Hugo".

Brady worked at Lightchaser Animation as an animation director for a few years before returning briefly to Pixomondo.

In 2019, Brady signed on to help create AMGI Studios, a new animation studio focused on using innovative technology to create high quality animations in real time. Brady is currently the Chief Creative Officer of AMGI studios.

== Filmography ==
- The Legend of Santa Claus (2013 - Director: Lumenas)
- The Lazarus Effect (2010 - Associate Producer: HBO Films)
- Anime: Drawing a Revolution (2007 - Himself)
- TMNT (2007 - Additional Animation Supervisor: Imagi Studios)
- Everyone's Hero (2006 - Director: 20th Century Fox)
- Lemony Snicket's A Series of Unfortunate Events (2004 - Animation Supervisor: ILM)
- The Making of 'Hulk' (2003 - Himself)
- Hulk (2003 - Animation Supervisor: ILM)
- E.T. the Extra-Terrestrial: 20th Anniversary Celebration (2002 - Himself)
- E.T: The Extra-Terrestrial (2002 - Animation Supervisor: 2002 special edition)
- Magnolia (1999 - Animator: ILM)
- Toy Story 2 (1999 - Additional Story Material, New Characters Designer: Pixar)
- A Bug's Life (1998 - Additional Animator: Pixar)
- Loose Tooth (1997 - Composer)
- Toy Story (1995 - Animator: Pixar)
- Hocus Pocus (1993 - Animator: Rhythm & Hues)
