= Churchville School =

- U.S. National Register of Historic Places
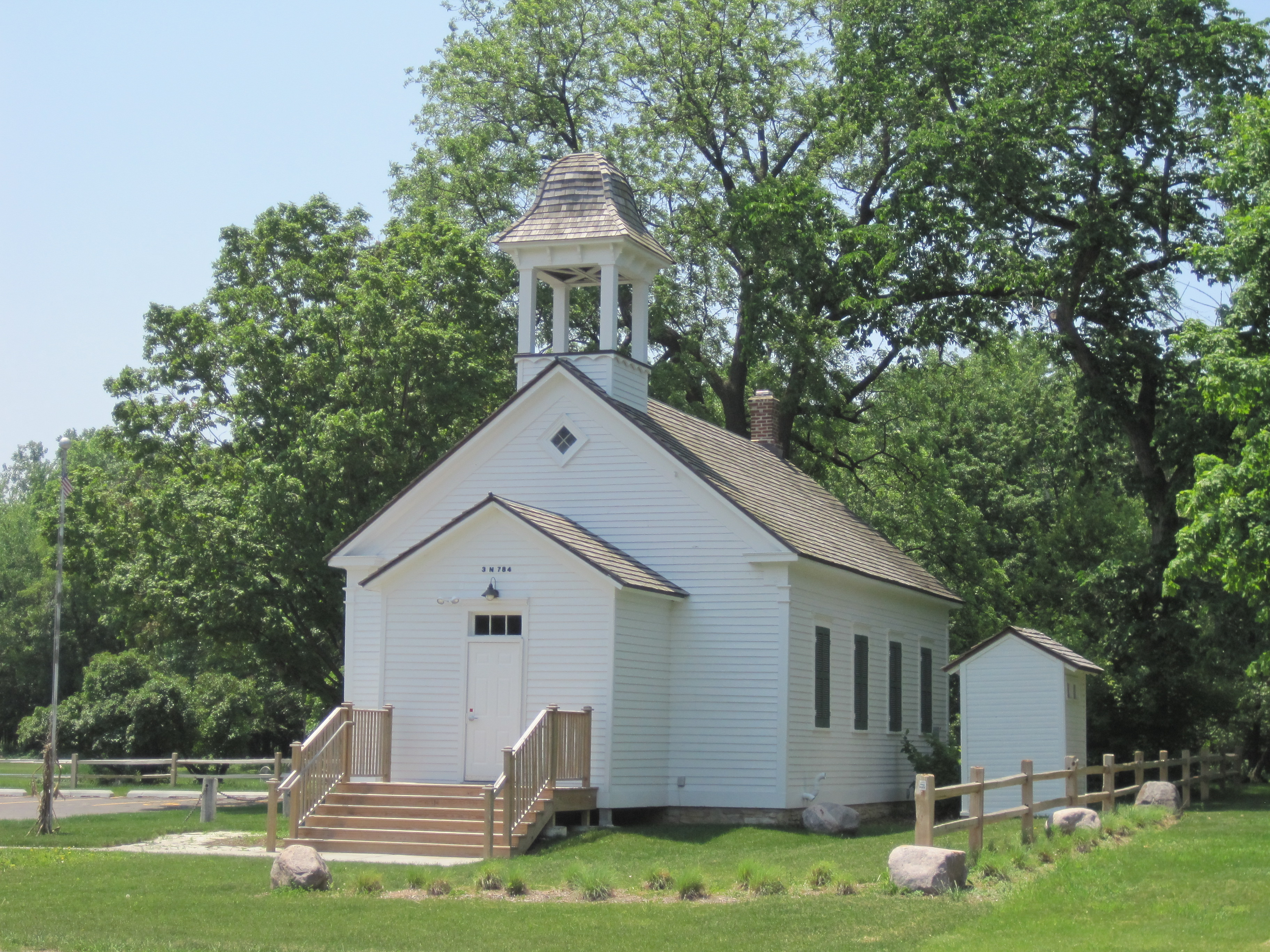
- Churchville School in 2011

- Location within Illinois Location within the United States
- Location: 3N 784 Church Rd. Bensenville, DuPage County, Illinois
- Coordinates: 41°56′5″N 87°57′13″W
- Area: less than one acre
- Built: 1846
- Architectural style: Greek Revival
- NRHP reference No.: 99000114
- Added to NRHP: February 5, 1999

Churchville School, also known as Fischer School, is a former school building located in unincorporated Bensenville, Illinois.

== History ==
Originally part of a schoolhouse for the original settlers of Addison Township, the first known date of use was 1846. Designated into Illinois School District #3, the land that the school was built on was donated by August Fischer. Classes were routinely held in the building until 1931. An Evangelical Lutheran church and a school for German-speaking children were also built on the grounds, but both were destroyed in a 1924 fire.

The building continued to see usage as a meeting place for organizations such as the Boy Scouts of America, and served as a polling station. In order to continue to qualify as a member of District #3, classes were held once annually until 1950, when the ownership of the school reverted to the Fischer family. Renovations occurred over a two-year span starting in 1967, and a local historic society began giving occasional tours of the school. Later, Elmhurst School District #205 began to maintain the building and offered regular tours. In 1999, it was added to the list of the National Register of Historic Places. The ownership of the school was given to the town of Elmhurst in 2001.

== Architecture ==
Churchville School is on the west side of Church Road north of Grand Avenue. It is a rectangular Greek Revival building. The front-gabled roof (facing east) is covered with cedar shingles and features a small brick chimney on the west end. The east end has a square belfry tower with a bell-shaped roof. Wood brackets decorate the soffit of the tower's eaves. The belfry was probably added to the building at a later date, probably in the 1850s or 1860s. The vestibule at the front of the building was also probably added at that time. The belfry roof is covered with asphalt shingles. The bell is no longer hanging; it is instead on display at the foot of the belfry. The foundation of the building is limestone, set in irregular courses. The siding of the building is wooden clapboard. A two-step wooden landing leads to the main entrance to the vestibule. A three-panel window decorates the area above the door. The door is a modern six-panel wood door. A simple cornice adorns the soffits on the north and south eaves. Simple pilasters are found at the main building's corners. A diamond-shaped window is above the vestibule on the main building. The northern and southern elevations have four one-over-one windows with decorative wood cornices and sills. The windows are decorated to appear like twelve-over-twelve windows, a feature that was probably added during renovations in the 1960s.
