= Senator Shapiro =

Senator Shapiro may refer to:

- David C. Shapiro (1925–1981), Illinois State Senate
- Florence Shapiro (born 1948), Texas State Senate
