= Ray Soden =

American politician (1925–2012)

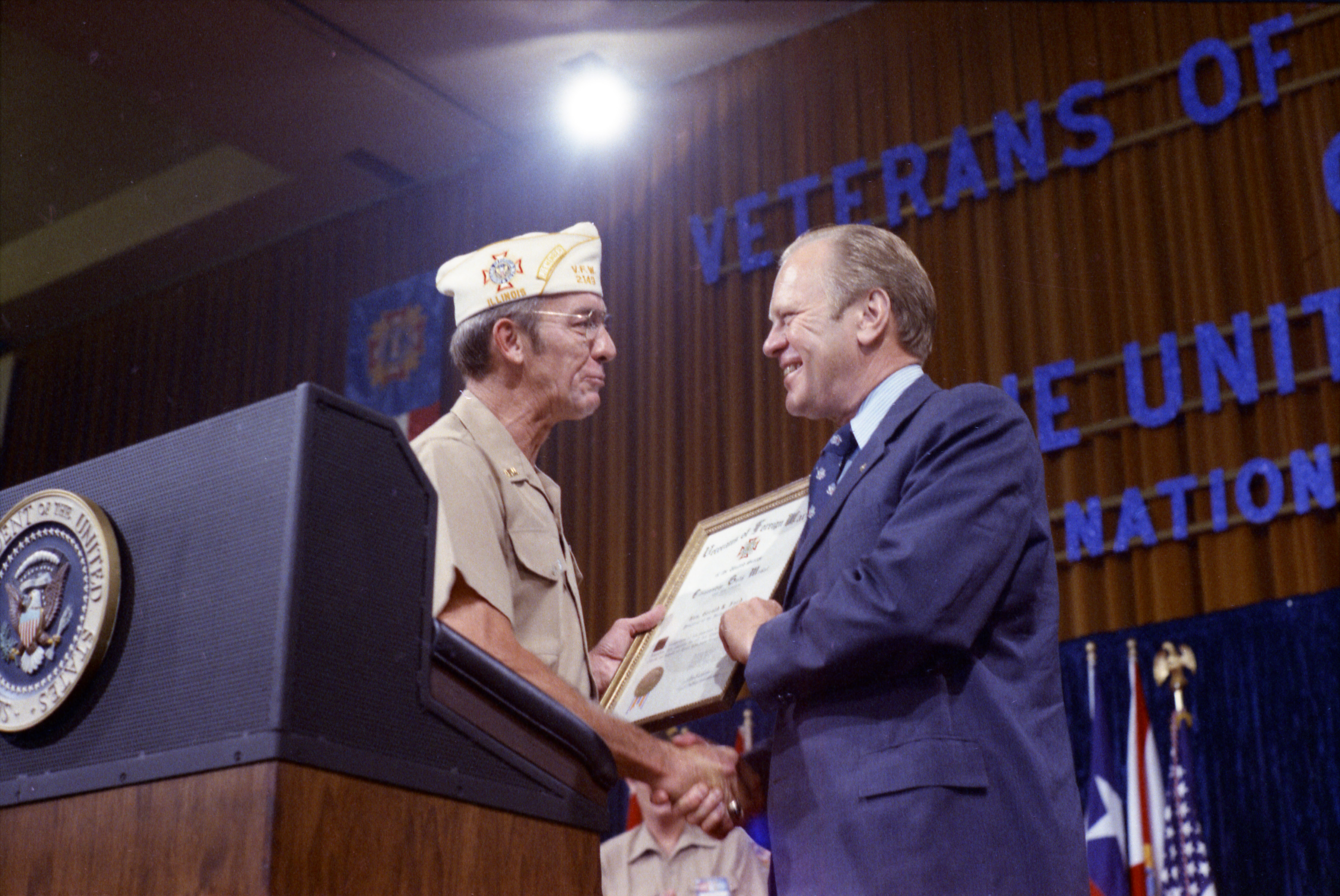

Member of the Illinois Senate from the 23rd district
- In office April 26, 2003 – January 3, 2005
- Preceded by: James Philip
- Succeeded by: Carole Pankau

Personal details
- Born: March 26, 1925 Chicago, Illinois
- Died: June 22, 2012 (aged 87) St. Joseph, Michigan
- Party: Republican
- Spouse: Shirley

Military service
- Allegiance: United States
- Branch/service: United States Navy
- Years of service: World War II

Raymond R. "Ray" Soden (March 26, 1925 – June 22, 2012) was an American politician.

== Early life ==
Raymond R. Soden was born March 26, 1924 in Chicago to a Polish American family. He was raised in the Montclare neighborhood and graduated from Steinmetz High School. He went to the Air Forces Institute and the College of DuPage. Soon after the attack on Pearl Harbor, Soden enlisted in the Navy. Initially, he was assigned as a musician, but applied for sea duty. He took part in the invasions of North Africa, Okinawa, Leyte Gulf, Guam, Saipan, Guadalcanal, and Iwo Jima. He served aboard the USS Claxton (DD-571). After the war, he became an engineer for the Illinois Bell Telephone Company and retired in 1982.

== Veterans advocacy ==
Soden was a member of the Veterans of Foreign Wars and was involved with veterans' affairs. After serving as the Illinois Commander of the Veterans of Foreign Wars, Soden was appointed a member of the Illinois Veterans' Commission. He assumed the role June 16, 1965. On November 19, 1969, Governor Richard B. Ogilvie appointed Soden the Chairman of the Illinois Veterans' Commission. On August 24, 1973, Soden was named the National Commander-in-Chief of the Veterans of Foreign Wars. During his time as national commander, he was a staunch opponent of amnesty for draft evasion in the Vietnam War.

== Political career ==
A Republican, in 1977, Soden was elected the Addison Township Supervisor. In 1982, he was elected to serve on the DuPage County, Illinois Board of Commissioners. In December 1988, Soden defeated County Board Chairman Jack T. Knuepfer in a 14–12 vote to become the President of the DuPage County Forest Preserve. Soden did not run for reelection to the county board in 1992. D. Dewey Pierotti succeeded Soden as a member of the county board from district 1 while Commissioner John J. Case succeeded him as the head of the Forest Preserve Commission.

Longtime Senator James "Pate" Philip resigned from the Illinois Senate effective April 30, 2003. The Legislative Committee of the Republican Party of the 23rd Legislative District, chaired by Pate Philip, appointed Ray Soden to the vacancy after their initial choice, former Judge Duane Walter, faced blowback for conduct while on the bench. He did not seek election in the 2004 election. In 2004, he was a member of the Bush-Cheney National Veterans Steering Committee. He resigned January 5, 2005. The winner of the 2004 general election, Carole Pankau, was appointed to succeed Soden. Soden died of lung disease at a hospital in St. Joseph, Michigan.

== Notes ==
Political offices
Preceded by James Philip	Illinois Senator; 2003 – 2005	Succeeded by Carole Pankau
