= Carole Pankau =

American politician

Member of the Illinois Senate from the 23rd district
- In office 2005–2013
- Preceded by: Ray Soden
- Succeeded by: Tom Cullerton

Personal details
- Born: August 13, 1947 (age 78) Boone Grove, Indiana
- Party: Republican
- Spouse: Anthony John
- Profession: Politician

Carole Pankau (born 1947) is a former Illinois State Senator from the Republican Party, representing the 23rd district from 2005 to 2013. Pankau previously served as State Representative from 1993 to 2005.

== Early life ==
Pankau earned a B.S. in accounting from the University of Illinois. She served as a member of the DuPage County Board from 1984 to 1992 and prior to that served on the school board for Keeneyville School District 20. She was active as a precinct committeeman in the Republican organization in Bloomingdale Township. In the 1992 general election, Pankau was elected to represent the 45th district.

== Illinois General Assembly ==
In the 1992 general election, Pankau was elected to represent the 45th district. During her tenure, she served on the Committees on Public Health (minority spokesperson); Appropriations III; Environment and Energy; Labor; Revenue. Pankau was a Republican candidate for DuPage County Chairman in 2010 but lost to Republican Daniel Cronin. Pankau lost Senate re-election in 2012 to Tom Cullerton.

== Community involvement ==
- Bloomingdale Township Volunteer Council, Past President
- DuPage County Health Board member for 4 years
- DuPage Housing Authority member for 4 years
- “In Focus” Cable TV Program, current hostess since 1992
- During the 2008 Republican Party presidential primaries, Pankau worked on behalf of the presidential campaign of former U.S. Senator Fred Thompson serving as a congressional district chair for Illinois's 6th congressional district.

== Personal ==
Pankau was born August 13, 1947, in Valparaiso, Indiana. She has been married to Anthony John Pankau Jr. since 1966. They have four grown children: John, Jason, Shay and Aaron. She has been a resident of DuPage County for more than 30 years. Pankau was a former owner-manager of an auto-body/towing business for 17 years.

Party political offices
Preceded by Thomas Jefferson Ramsdell	Republican nominee for Illinois Comptroller; 2006	Succeeded by Judy Baar Topinka
