= Jack T. Knuepfer =

American businessman and politician (1920–2006)

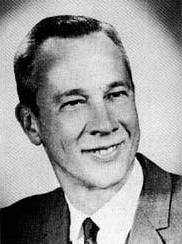
- official portrait, circa 1967

Member of the Illinois State Senate
- In office January 1967 – January 1975
- Preceded by: District created
- Succeeded by: Pate Philip
- Constituency: 39th district (1967–1973); 40th district (1973–1975)

Personal details
- Born: November 16, 1920 Chicago, Illinois
- Died: September 13, 2006 (aged 85) Elmhurst, Illinois
- Party: Republican
- Spouse: Virginia
- Education: Carleton College; University of Chicago
- Profession: Business owner Politician

Military service
- Allegiance: United States
- Branch/service: United States Army
- Years of service: 1941–1946
- Rank: Lieutenant

Jack T. Knuepfer (November 16, 1920 – September 13, 2006) was an American businessman and politician.

== Early life ==
Jack T. Knuepfer was born in Chicago on November 16, 1920. Knuepfer graduated from Oak Park River Forest High School in 1938. He chose to continue his education at Carleton College. At the start of World War II, he left Carleton College and joined the American Field Service where he drove an ambulance for the British Army in Egypt. After the United States entered the war, Knuepfer enlisted in the United States Army. He served in the North African campaign and European theater. During this time, he received multiple battlefield commissions and was promoted from private to Lieutenant. After the war, he served in Berlin on military government staff of General Lucius D. Clay. Knuepfer completed his studies at Carlton College and received his master's degree in business from University of Chicago. He worked for his family's machine tool business: General Engineering Works in Elmhurst, Illinois. After the war, he married his wife Virginia, with whom he had four children and one step-child.

== Political career ==
Knuepfer became involved in local Republican politics as a precinct committeeman and was elected to the Elmhurst City Council.

=== Illinois General Assembly ===
He served on the Elmhurst City Council. Then, in 1965, Knuepner served in the Illinois House of Representatives and was a Republican. In 1966, Knuepner ran for Illinois Senate. He defeated three other candidates to win the Republican nomination for the newly drawn 39th district. In the 1966 general election, Knuepfer defeated Democratic candidate and millionaire Michael Butler of Oakbrook with 51,411 to Butler's 24,140. From 1967 to 1975, Knuepfer served in the Illinois State Senate. In 1969, he was a member of the Constitution Study Commission.

In 1971, he was redistricted into the 40th district. In the 1972 Republican primary, he defeated John L. Benzin with 8,236 votes to Benzin's 3,852 votes. Knuepfer chose to retire rather than seek reelection in 1974. State Representative Pate Philip narrowly defeated Democratic candidate Bud Loftus to succeed Knuepfer in an otherwise strongly Democratic year; a product of the fallout of the Watergate scandal.

=== DuPage County Chairman ===
On October 11, 1977, Knuepfer announced that he would run for the Republican nomination for Chairman of the DuPage County Board of Commissioners. Three days later Republican incumbent Gerald Weeks announced he would not seek reelection and endorse Knuepfer. From 1978 to 1990, Knuepfer served as chairman of the DuPage County, Illinois Board of Commissioners. Knuepfer was an advocate for a powerful, robust county government. In 1990, Knuepfer was an unsuccessful candidate for renomination, losing the Republican primary to attorney Aldo Botti.

== Death and legacy ==
Knuepfer died at Elmhurst Memorial Hospital in Elmhurst, Illinois. A through arch bridge that spans the Canadian National Railway tracks in West Chicago, Illinois is named after Knuepfer. The bridge is part of the Illinois Prairie Path and was completed in 1990. It won the American Institute of Steel Construction Prize Bridge Competition Award of Merit.

A DuPage County government building is named in his honor, the Jack T. Knuepfer Administration building, 421 North County Farm Road, Wheaton, Illinois.
