= 2006 Illinois elections =

2006 State Election in Illinois, United States

- November 7, 2006
- Turnout: 48.64%

The 2006 Illinois elections were held on November 7, 2006. On that date, registered voters in the State of Illinois elected officeholders for U.S. Congress, to six statewide offices (Governor/Lieutenant Governor, Attorney General, Secretary of States, Treasurer and Comptroller), as well as to the Illinois Senate and Illinois House.

The incumbent Treasurer Judy Baar Topinka, previously the only Republican elected statewide, made an unsuccessful run for governor rather than stand for re-election. Democrat Alexi Giannoulias was elected to succeed her, and the Democratic incumbents for the other statewide offices won re-election, making Illinois the only Midwestern state in which Democrats held all statewide offices.

For the first time since the 1930s, all executive offices and control of the Illinois General Assembly was won by the Democratic Party. The last time any party had met this feat had been the mid-1990s, when the Republican Party held such power following the 1994 Illinois elections.

== Election information ==
2006 was a midterm election year in the United States.

=== Turnout ===
==== Primary election ====
For the primary election, turnout was 24.84%, with 1,804,624 votes cast.

Turnout by county

County	Registration	Votes cast	Turnout
Adams	43,261	7,721	17.85%
Alexander	7,670	2,330	30.38%
Bond	10,486	1,877	17.9%
Boone	30,069	6,066	20.17%
Brown	3,467	617	17.8%
Bureau	25,122	4,910	19.54%
Calhoun	3,880	1,636	42.16%
Carroll	12,360	2,493	20.17%
Cass	9,136	1,291	14.13%
Champaign	112,302	22,695	20.21%
Christian	23,170	3,127	13.5%
Clark	12,217	1,810	14.82%
Clay	9,647	2,274	23.57%
Clinton	25,364	2,313	9.12%
Coles	29,746	6,745	22.68%
Cook (Note: For more on Cook County primary turnout, see 2006 Cook County, Illinois elections#Voter turnout)	2,682,718	762,273	28.41%
Crawford	13,044	2,146	16.45%
Cumberland	8,723	1,752	20.08%
DeKalb	53,224	12,439	23.37%
DeWitt	12,426	2,569	20.67%
Douglas	12,387	4,271	34.48%
DuPage	518,275	149,399	28.83%
Edgar	12,703	2,120	16.69%
Edwards	4,596	1,076	23.41%
Effingham	21,702	3,968	18.28%
Fayette	14,708	2,926	19.89%
Ford	8,831	2,851	32.28%
Franklin	30,480	8,435	27.67%
Fulton	26,445	8,177	30.92%
Gallatin	4,452	2,524	56.69%
Greene	9,368	2,784	29.72%
Grundy	30,596	8,270	27.03%
Hamilton	6,515	2,642	40.55%
Hancock	13,156	3,750	28.5%
Hardin	3,875	1,590	41.03%
Henderson	5,211	1,513	29.03%
Henry	38,356	5,850	15.25%
Iroquois	19,370	6,208	32.05%
Jackson	44,358	7,925	17.87%
Jasper	7,498	2,476	33.02%
Jefferson	26,935	5,451	20.24%
Jersey	16,023	3,561	22.22%
Jo Daviess	16,225	5,568	34.32%
Johnson	7,485	3,526	47.11%
Kane	244,891	66,331	27.09%
Kankakee	64,855	10,322	15.92%
Kendall	51,495	17,900	34.76%
Knox	33,646	7,687	22.85%
Lake	369,845	81,724	22.1%
LaSalle	72,650	13,384	18.42%
Lawrence	11,104	2,616	23.56%
Lee	24,570	5,779	23.52%
Livingston	23,302	4,468	19.17%
Logan	18,845	4,520	23.99%
Macon	78,617	8,594	10.93%
Macoupin	35,273	9,289	26.33%
Madison	170,202	27,101	15.92%
Marion	30,063	4,259	14.17%
Marshall	8,590	1,778	20.7%
Mason	10,787	2,085	19.33%
Massac	12,454	2,855	22.92%
McDonough	18,230	3,993	21.9%
McHenry	185,638	50,251	27.07%
McLean	97,788	19,097	19.53%
Menard	8,890	1,990	22.38%
Mercer	13,960	2,235	16.01%
Monroe	22,520	6,494	28.84%
Montgomery	17,706	2,556	14.44%
Morgan	22,938	5,949	25.94%
Moultrie	9,561	1,470	15.37%
Ogle	36,013	11,193	31.08%
Peoria	109,973	18,772	17.07%
Perry	14,755	3,008	20.39%
Piatt	12,155	2,460	20.24%
Pike	12,300	1,843	14.98%
Pope	3,516	1,272	36.18%
Pulaski	5,840	2,061	35.29%
Putnam	4,534	1,139	25.12%
Randolph	23,362	6,013	25.74%
Richland	12,993	1,899	14.62%
Rock Island	115,949	18,346	15.82%
Saline	16,583	5,132	30.95%
Sangamon	128,744	24,276	18.86%
Schuyler	5,518	1,480	26.82%
Scott	3,844	711	18.5%
Shelby	16,062	3,826	23.82%
Stark	4,870	819	16.82%
St. Clair	186,967	27,472	14.69%
Stephenson	33,182	6,370	19.2%
Tazewell	92,905	15,161	16.32%
Union	16,026	4,305	26.86%
Vermilion	49,290	6,998	14.2%
Wabash	10,186	1,896	18.61%
Warren	12,284	3,733	30.39%
Washington	11,919	2,980	25%
Wayne	12,716	4,405	34.64%
White	11,685	2,993	25.61%
Whiteside	41,937	5,632	13.43%
Will	329,996	105,092	31.85%
Williamson	41,867	8,442	20.16%
Winnebago	175,825	38,044	21.64%
Woodford	24,171	6,179	25.56%
Total	7,263,969	1,804,624	24.84%

==== General election ====
For the general election, turnout was 48.64%, with 3,587,676 votes cast.

Turnout by county

County	Registration	Votes cast	Turnout%
Adams	43,873	22,599	51.51%
Alexander	7,760	3,126	40.28%
Bond	10,486	5,990	57.12%
Boone	31,627	15,711	49.68%
Brown	3,525	2,147	60.91%
Bureau	25,226	12,349	48.95%
Calhoun	3,983	2,486	62.42%
Carroll	12,734	6,142	48.23%
Cass	9,037	4,631	51.24%
Champaign	113,905	53,869	47.29%
Christian	23,329	11,922	51.1%
Clark	12,263	5,825	47.5%
Clay	9,384	5,062	53.94%
Clinton	25,250	12,652	50.11%
Coles	30,632	14,447	47.16%
Cook (Note: For more on Cook County general election turnout, see 2006 Cook County, Illinois elections#Voter turnout)	2,710,118	1,350,915	49.85%
Crawford	13,392	7,185	53.65%
Cumberland	8,783	4,064	46.27%
DeKalb	54,766	26,336	48.09%
DeWitt	12,732	6,034	47.39%
Douglas	12,494	6,089	48.74%
DuPage	529,726	268,988	50.78%
Edgar	12,205	6,499	53.25%
Edwards	4,660	2,741	58.82%
Effingham	22,306	12,829	57.51%
Fayette	14,902	7,990	53.62%
Ford	9,976	4,491	45.02%
Franklin	30,466	13,812	45.34%
Fulton	26,591	13,257	49.86%
Gallatin	4,483	2,653	59.18%
Greene	9,411	5,023	53.37%
Grundy	28,508	14,580	51.14%
Hamilton	6,459	4,040	62.55%
Hancock	13,363	7,785	58.26%
Hardin	3,959	2,275	57.46%
Henderson	5,297	3,031	57.22%
Henry	36,633	18,295	49.94%
Iroquois	20,017	9,504	47.48%
Jackson	45,362	16,143	35.59%
Jasper	7,373	4,136	56.1%
Jefferson	27,269	12,924	47.39%
Jersey	15,730	7,874	50.06%
Jo Daviess	16,311	8,248	50.57%
Johnson	7,512	4,590	61.1%
Kane	252,171	116,249	46.1%
Kankakee	62,344	31,431	50.42%
Kendall	54,857	25,709	46.87%
Knox	34,254	17,802	51.97%
Lake	369,853	190,718	51.57%
LaSalle	73,127	34,221	46.8%
Lawrence	10,028	5,299	52.84%
Lee	24,922	11,177	44.85%
Livingston	23,340	11,044	47.32%
Logan	19,094	10,248	53.67%
Macon	84,882	35,480	41.8%
Macoupin	34,560	17,693	51.2%
Madison	172,933	80,580	46.6%
Marion	30,063	12,629	42.01%
Marshall	8,736	4,673	53.49%
Mason	10,611	5,122	48.27%
Massac	12,688	5,447	42.93%
McDonough	19,105	10,136	53.05%
McHenry	186,323	82,725	44.4%
McLean	99,949	44,171	44.19%
Menard	8,954	5,183	57.88%
Mercer	14,145	6,363	44.98%
Monroe	22,375	11,127	49.73%
Montgomery	18,105	11,213	61.93%
Morgan	23,421	12,107	51.69%
Moultrie	9,295	4,952	53.28%
Ogle	36,994	16,223	43.85%
Peoria	119,412	55,418	46.41%
Perry	14,518	7,926	54.59%
Piatt	12,323	6,722	54.55%
Pike	12,397	6,244	50.37%
Pope	3,535	2,105	59.55%
Pulaski	6,597	2,921	44.28%
Putnam	4,513	2,313	51.25%
Randolph	23,607	12,052	51.05%
Richland	13,236	6,268	47.36%
Rock Island	117,626	47,130	40.07%
Saline	16,992	9,487	55.83%
Sangamon	131,579	76,504	58.14%
Schuyler	5,513	3,216	58.33%
Scott	3,890	2,089	53.7%
Shelby	16,402	7,889	48.1%
Stark	4,919	2,222	45.17%
St. Clair	189,124	70,725	37.4%
Stephenson	32,043	13,763	42.95%
Tazewell	93,838	44,098	46.99%
Union	16,237	7,086	43.64%
Vermilion	50,038	23,716	47.4%
Wabash	10,132	4,707	46.46%
Warren	11,164	6,040	54.1%
Washington	12,083	6,478	53.61%
Wayne	12,159	7,526	61.9%
White	11,820	6,330	53.55%
Whiteside	42,621	17,916	42.04%
Will	344,584	162,745	47.23%
Williamson	42,900	21,094	49.17%
Winnebago	184,352	80,876	43.87%
Woodford	24,587	13,059	53.11%
Total	7,375,688	3,587,676	48.64%

== Federal elections ==
=== United States House ===
All 19 of Illinois’ seats in the United States House of Representatives were up for election in 2006.

No seats switched parties, leaving the composition of Illinois' House delegation 10 Democrats and 9 Republicans.

== State elections ==
=== Governor and lieutenant governor ===
2006 Illinois gubernatorial election
- November 7, 2006
- Turnout: 47.29%
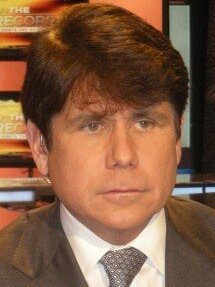

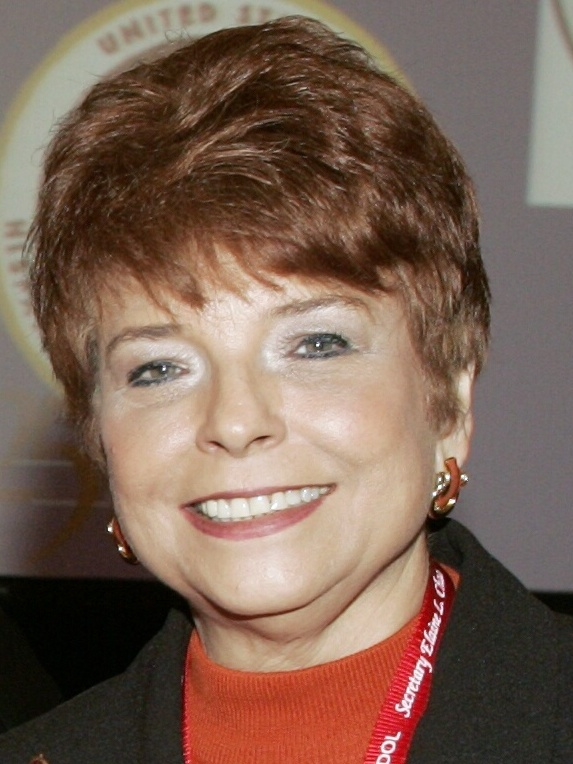

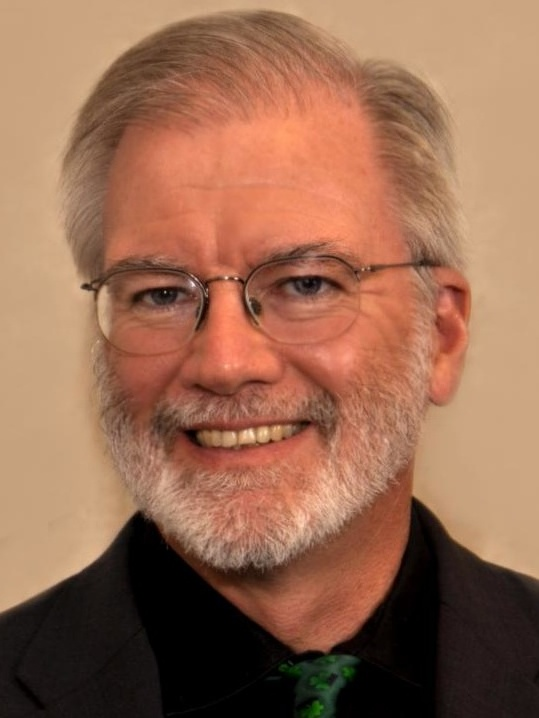
Nominee	Rod Blagojevich	Judy Baar Topinka	Rich Whitney
Party	Democratic	Republican	Green
Running mate	Pat Quinn	Joe Birkett	Julie Samuels
Popular vote	1,736,731	1,369,315	361,336
Percentage	49.8%	39.3%	10.4%
- County results Blagojevich: 30–40% 40–50% 50–60% 60–70% Topinka: 30–40% 40–50% 50–60% 60–70% 70–80%
Governor before election
Rod Blagojevich
Democratic
Elected Governor
Rod Blagojevich
Democratic

The 2006 Illinois gubernatorial election took place on November 7, 2006. Incumbent Democratic Governor and Lieutenant Governor Rod Blagojevich and Pat Quinn won re-election to a second four-year term.

Illinois gubernatorial election, 2006
Party	Candidate	Votes	%
Democratic	Rod Blagojevich (incumbent)/ Pat Quinn (incumbent)	1,736,731	49.79%
Republican	Judy Baar Topinka/ Joe Birkett	1,369,315	39.26%
Green	Rich Whitney/ Julie Samuels	361,336	10.36%
Write-in		20,607	0.59%
Total votes		3,487,989	

=== Attorney general ===
2006 Illinois Attorney General election
- November 7, 2006
- Turnout: 47.18%
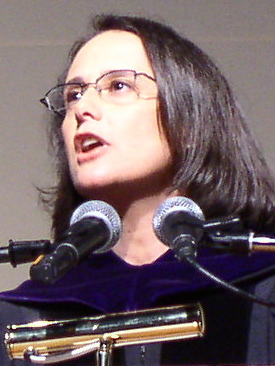

Nominee	Lisa Madigan	Stewart Umholtz
Party	Democratic	Republican
Popular vote	2,521,113	843,903
Percentage	72.45%	24.25%
- County results Madigan: 40–50% 50–60% 60–70% 70–80% 80–90% Umholtz: 50–60%
Attorney General before election
Lisa Madigan
Democratic
Elected Attorney General
Lisa Madigan
Democratic

Incumbent Democratic attorney general Lisa Madigan won reelection to a second term in office. She won every county in the state except for Edwards and Tazewell.

==== Democratic primary ====
Attorney General Democratic primary
Party	Candidate	Votes	%
Democratic	Lisa Madigan (incumbent)	858,635	100
Total votes		858,635	100

==== Republican primary ====
Attorney General Republican primary
Party	Candidate	Votes	%
Republican	Stewart Umholtz	581,802	100
Republican	JoAnn Breivogel	12	0.00
Total votes		581,814	100

==== General election ====
Attorney General election
Party	Candidate	Votes	%
Democratic	Lisa Madigan (incumbent)	2,521,113	72.45
Republican	Stewart Umholtz	843,903	24.25
Green	David F. Black	114,796	3.30
Total votes		3,479,812	100

=== Secretary of state ===
2006 Illinois Secretary of State election
- November 7, 2006
- Turnout: 47.59%
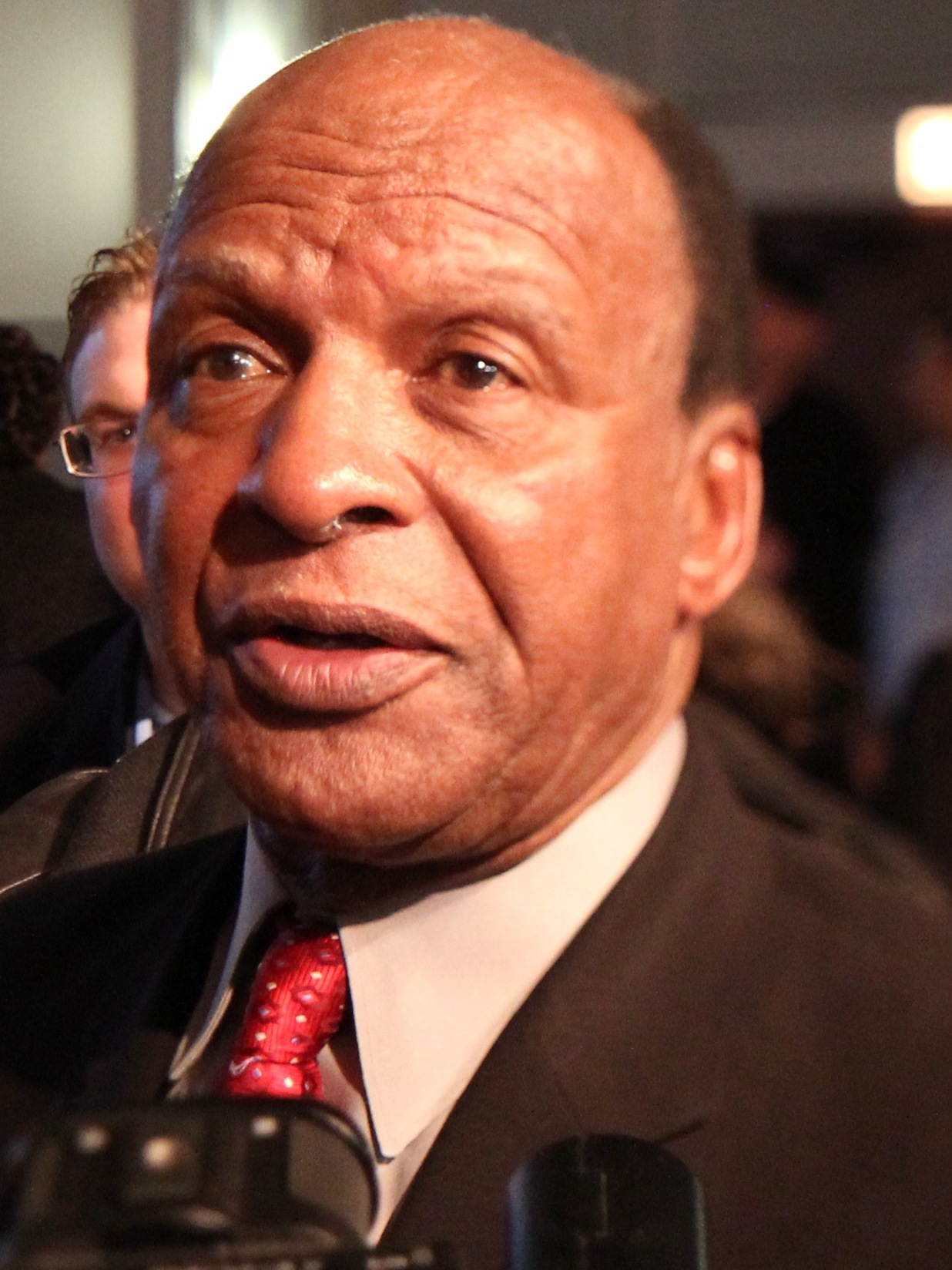

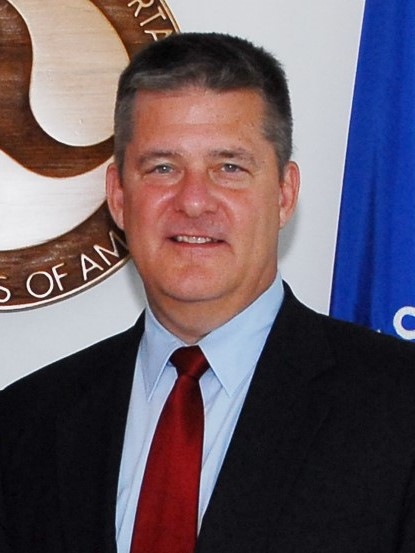
Nominee	Jesse White	Dan Rutherford
Party	Democratic	Republican
Popular vote	2,204,762	1,159,363
Percentage	62.82%	33.03%
- County results White: 40–50% 50–60% 60–70% 70–80% Rutherford: 40–50% 50–60% 60–70% 70–80%
Secretary of State before election
Jesse White
Democratic
Elected Secretary of State
Jesse White
Democratic

Incumbent Democratic Secretary of State Jesse White won reelection to a third term in office.

==== Democratic primary ====
Secretary of State Democratic primary
Party	Candidate	Votes	%
Democratic	Jesse White (incumbent)	880,209	100
Total votes		880,209	100

==== Republican primary ====
Secretary of State Republican primary
Party	Candidate	Votes	%
Republican	Dan Rutherford	602,147	100
Total votes		602,147	100

==== General election ====
Green Party nominee Adrian Frost withdrew before the election.

Secretary of State election
Party	Candidate	Votes	%
Democratic	Jesse White (incumbent)	2,204,762	62.82
Republican	Dan Rutherford	1,159,363	33.03
Green	Karen "Young" Peterson	145,724	4.15
Write-in	Alaka Wiakar	1	0.00
Total votes		3,707,224	100

=== Comptroller ===
2006 Illinois State Comptroller election
- November 7, 2006
- Turnout: 46.40%
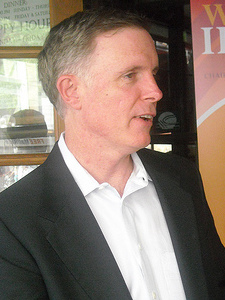

Nominee	Daniel Hynes	Carole Pankau
Party	Democratic	Republican
Popular vote	2,198,658	1,077,540
Percentage	64.25%	31.49%
- County results Hynes: 40–50% 50–60% 60–70% 70–80% Pankau: 40–50% 50–60%
State Comptroller before election
Daniel Hynes
Democratic
Elected State Comptroller
Daniel Hynes
Democratic

Incumbent Comptroller Daniel Hynes, a Democrat, was reelected to a third term.

==== Democratic primary ====
Comptroller Democratic primary
Party	Candidate	Votes	%
Democratic	Daniel W. Hynes (incumbent)	821,666	100
Total votes		821,666	100

==== Republican primary ====
Comptroller Republican primary
Party	Candidate	Votes	%
Republican	Carole Pankau	580,148	100
Total votes		580,148	100

==== General election ====
2006 Illinois comptroller debate
No.	Date	Host	Moderator	Link	Democratic	Republican
Key: P Participant A Absent N Not invited I Invited W Withdrawn						
Key: P Participant A Absent N Not invited I Invited W Withdrawn					Daniel Hynes	Carole Pankau
1	Oct. 25, 2006	City Club of Chicago	Paul Green	YouTube	P	P

Comptroller election
Party	Candidate	Votes	%
Democratic	Daniel W. Hynes (incumbent)	2,198,658	64.25
Republican	Carole Pankau	1,077,540	31.49
Green	Alicia Snyder	145,930	4.26
Total votes		3,422,128	100

=== Treasurer ===
2006 Illinois State Treasurer election
- November 7, 2006
- Turnout: 46.21%
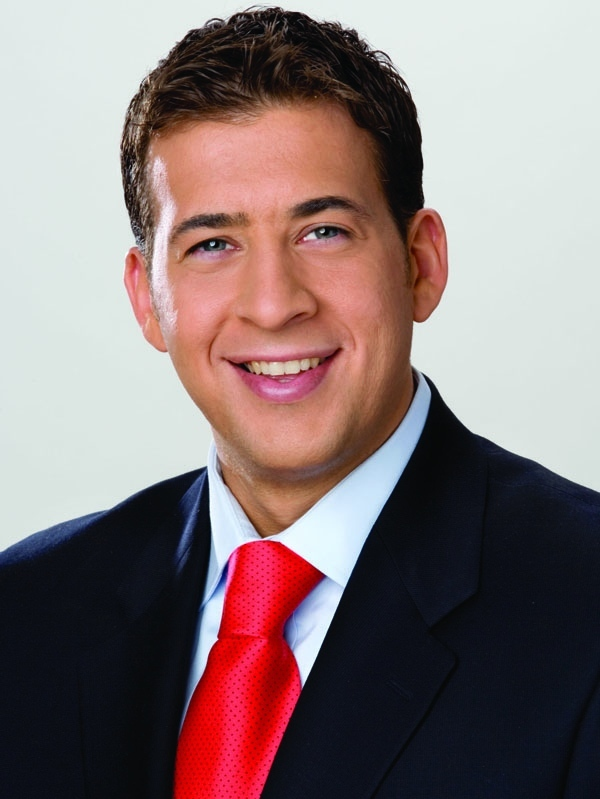

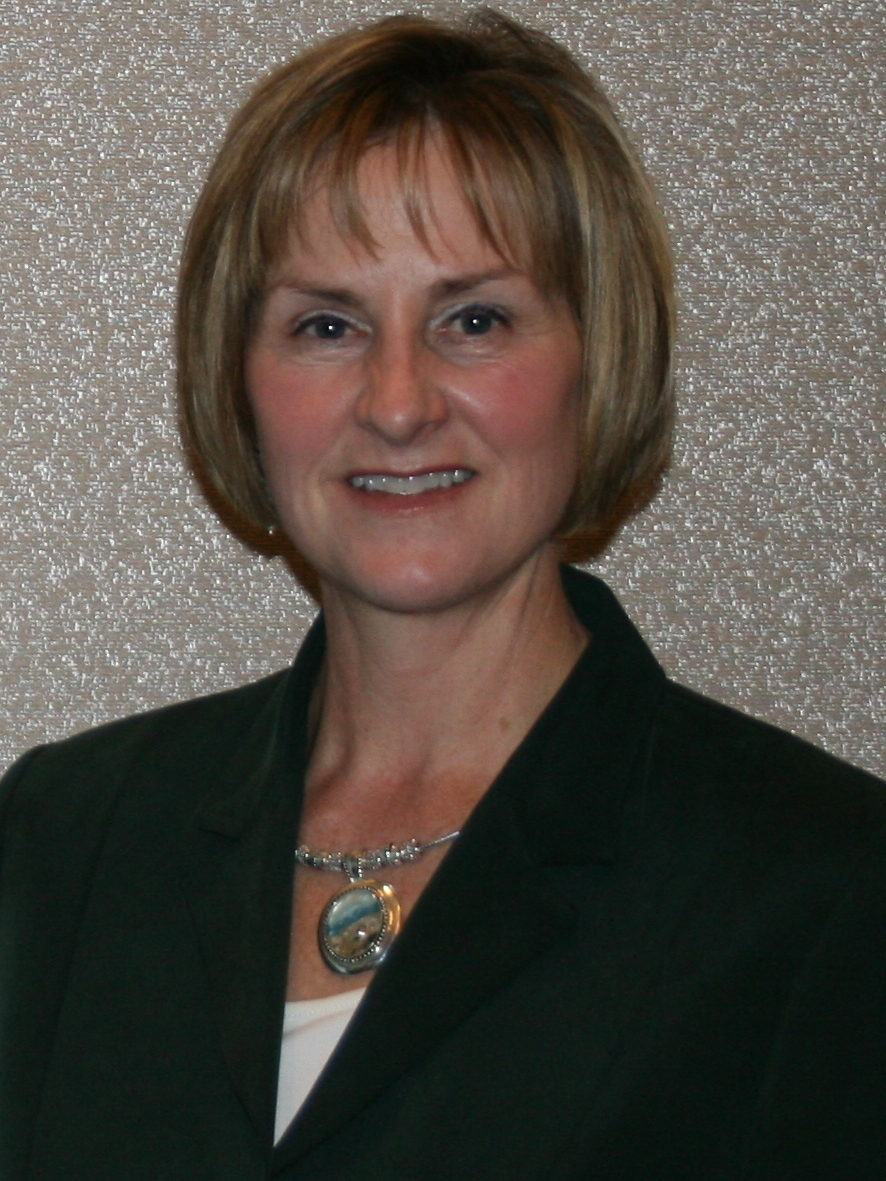
Nominee	Alexi Giannoulias	Christine Radogno
Party	Democratic	Republican
Popular vote	1,838,094	1,405,540
Percentage	53.94%	41.24%
- County results Giannoulias: 40–50% 50–60% 60–70% Radogno: 40–50% 50–60% 60–70%
Treasurer before election
Judy Baar Topinka
Republican
Elected Treasurer
Alexi Giannoulias
Democratic

Incumbent Treasurer Judy Baar Topinka, a Republican, did not seek reelection to a second term, instead opting to run for governor. Democrat Alexi Giannoulias was elected to succeed her.

==== Democratic primary ====
Treasurer Democratic primary
Party	Candidate	Votes	%
Democratic	Alexi Giannoulias	536,329	61.79
Democratic	Paul L. Mangieri	331,672	38.21
Total votes		868,001	100

==== Republican primary ====
Treasurer Republican primary
Party	Candidate	Votes	%
Republican	Christine Radogno	576,174	100
Total votes		576,174	100

==== General election ====
2006 Illinois treasurer debate
No.	Date	Host	Moderator	Link	Democratic	Republican
Key: P Participant A Absent N Not invited I Invited W Withdrawn						
Key: P Participant A Absent N Not invited I Invited W Withdrawn					Alexi Giannoulias	Christine Radogno
1	Oct. 17, 2006	City Club of Chicago	Paul Green	YouTube	P	P

Treasurer election
Party	Candidate	Votes	%
Democratic	Alexi Giannoulias	1,838,094	53.94
Republican	Christine Radogno	1,405,540	41.24
Green	Dan Rodriguez Schlorff	164,320	4.82
Write-in	Alaka Wiakar	2	0.00
Total votes		3,407,956	100

=== State Senate ===
2006 Illinois Senate election
- November 7, 2006

39 of 59 seats in the Illinois Senate 30 seats needed for a majority
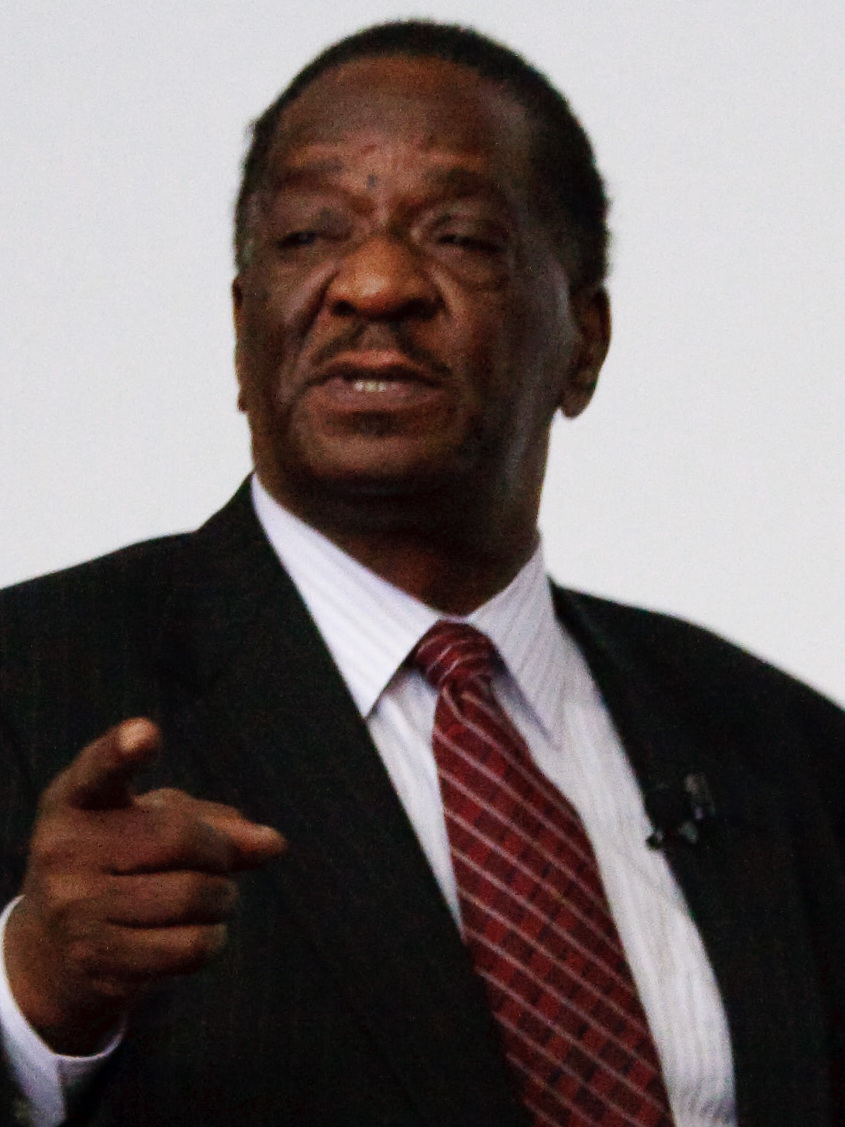

	Majority party	Minority party	Third party
Leader	Emil Jones	Frank Watson	N/A
Party	Democratic	Republican	Independent
Leader's seat	14th	51st	N/A
Last election	31	27	1
Seats won	37	22	0
Seat change	▲6	▼5	▼1
- Results: Democratic gain Democratic hold Republican hold No election
President before election
Emil Jones
Democratic
Elected President
Emil Jones
Democratic

39 of the seats of the Illinois Senate were up for election in 2006.

=== State House of Representatives ===
All of the seats in the Illinois House of Representatives were up for election in 2010.

- Illinois House of Representatives elections, 2006 at Ballotpedia

=== Judicial elections ===
Multiple judicial positions were up for election in 2006.

== Local elections ==
Local elections were held. These included county elections, such as the Cook County elections.
