= Hubert J. Loftus =

American politician (1924–1995)

Bud Loftus

Member of the Illinois House of Representatives from the 40th district
- In office January 1982 – January 1983
- Preceded by: William A. Redmond
- Succeeded by: District Abolished

Personal details
- Born: September 29, 1924 Chicago, Illinois, US
- Died: May 24, 1995 (aged 70) Addison, Illinois, US
- Party: Democratic
- Spouse: Margaret Mary Robinson
- Children: 9
- Education: Southern Illinois University (B.A., M.A.); John Marshall Law School (J.D.)
- Profession: Attorney

Military service
- Allegiance: United States
- Branch/service: United States Army
- Years of service: 1942-1946
- Unit: United States Army Air Corps

Hubert J. "Bud" Loftus (September 29, 1924 – May 24, 1995) was an American lawyer, politician and community theater actor.

Born in Chicago, Illinois, Loftus served in the United States Army Air Corps during World War II. He received his bachelor's and master's degrees from Southern Illinois University. Loftus then received his Juris Doctor degree from John Marshall Law School in 1955 and was admitted to the Illinois bar. In 1957, Loftus moved to Addison, Illinois and started his law practice. Bill Redmond joined the law firm in the eighties which included future DuPage Judge Thomas J. Riggs. The firm added Attorney Dan Duff and became Loftus, Riggs, Redmond and Duff, Ltd. During his legal career, he worked as the city attorney for Addison and Oakbrook Terrace, attorney for the Addison Park District, and as a special assistant attorney general for the State of Illinois.

Loftus joined the local Democratic Party serving as Vice Chair of the DuPage County Democratic Party and as Chairman of the Addison Township Democratic Organization. In the 1964 general election, Loftus was the Democratic candidate for DuPage County State's Attorney. In 1966, he ran for the Illinois House of Representatives, winning the Democratic primary, but finishing fourth of fourth for the three seats. In 1974, he ran for the state senate seat being vacated by Jack T. Knuepfer. In the Democratic wave year, he held future Senate President Pate Philip to the lowest win margin of his political career, just over 1,000 out of 43,000 votes. Loftus was a delegate for Jimmy Carter during the 1980 Democratic primary and hosted Carter at his Addison home on October 6, 1980.

Loftus was appointed to the Illinois House of Representatives in January 1982 to succeed former Speaker and his law partner William A. Redmond. He lost in the new, heavily Republican single member district to Lee A. Daniels. Prior to the Cutback Amendment, Democrats in DuPage County had previously been able to win one of a House district's three seats due to cumulative voting in multi-member districts.

In 1986, Loftus was one of three candidates found highly qualified by the DuPage County Bar Association, but was not selected for one of three associate judgeship vacancies.

Loftus was a member of Addison Community Theater and Tempo Players. He performed in many shows, including Mayor Shinn in "Music Man"; Grandpa Vanderbilt in "You Can't Take It With You"; and Big Jule in "Guys and Dolls". He was also cast as an extra for the 1987 movie "The Untouchables" with Kevin Costner and Sean Connery.

Loftus died at his home in Addison, Illinois on May 24, 1995. He was married to Margaret Mary Robinson for 40 years and they had nine children, Kathleen, Carol, Patrick, Valerie, Marilyn, Hubert Jr., Mary Lou, Elizabeth and Timothy.
