= Fenton High School (Illinois) =

- Fenton High School Logo

Location
- 1000 W. Green Street; Bensenville, Illinois 60106

Information
- School type: Public Secondary
- Opened: 1917, 1927 (Bensenville Community High School), 1955 (Fenton Community High School)
- School district: Fenton HS District #100
- Teaching staff: 95.00(FTE)
- Grades: 9–12
- Enrollment: 1,422 (2023–2024)
- Average class size: 17.9
- Student to teacher ratio: 14.97
- Campus: Suburban
- Colours: Orange; Royal Blue
- Athletics conference: Upstate Eight Conference
- Nickname: Bison
- Publication: Kaleidoscope
- Newspaper: Signal
- Yearbook: Highlights
- Website: https://www.fenton100.org/

Fenton High School, or FHS, is a public four-year high school located in Bensenville, Illinois, located on the western suburbs of Chicago, in the United States. It is the only school in Community High School District 100.

== History ==
High school education started in Bensenville as a two-year, then three-year high school serving the Bensenville area from 1917-1924 as part of Bensenville Elementary School District 2. In 1925 Community High School District 100 was founded with a four-year program serving both Bensenville and Wood Dale. In 1927, Bensenville Community High School was built. By 1951, the enrollment grew far beyond the building's capacity and a referendum was passed allowing the board to build a new building. Opened in September 1955, the school was named Fenton Community High School after Frederick C. Fenton, the district's first superintendent.

== Academics ==
In 2007, Fenton had an average composite ACT score of 20.0, and graduated 87.3% of its senior class. The average class size is 17.9. Fenton has not made Adequate Yearly Progress on the Prairie State Achievement Examination, which with the ACT, acts as the test in Illinois to fulfill the federal No Child Left Behind Act. The school has not met the overall AYP in reading, as did three subgroups. One subgroup failed to meet AYP in mathematics.

The school awards credit on a semester basis, with students being required to earn 45 semester credits for graduation. Starting with the class of 2012, graduation requires 8 semesters of English, 7 semesters of physical education, 6 semesters in social studies and math, and four in science. Two credits are required in fine and applied arts (which includes foreign languages). One semester is required in health and information processing.

The school offers 19 Advanced Placement courses: Studio Art, French Language, German Language, Spanish Language, Computer Science, Statistics, Calculus (AB & BC), Biology, Chemistry, AP Physics 1, U.S. History, World History, Microeconomics, and Macroeconomics.

In English, there is a year–long course termed "AP American Literature", which is designed to prepare students for the AP English Language and Composition test. There are two single semester courses titled "AP American Writers" and "AP Seminar in English" which jointly prepare students for the AP English Literature and Composition test.

AP Computer Science A is also offered.

All students are required to complete 25 hours of community service for graduation.

== Athletics ==
Fenton competes in the Upstate Eight Conference and is a member of the Illinois High School Association (IHSA), which sponsors the state championship series for most sports in Illinois. Its mascot is the Bison.

The school offers interscholastic sports for men and women in basketball, bowling, cross country, gymnastics, soccer. swimming & diving, tennis, track & field, and volleyball. Men may also compete in baseball, football, golf, and wrestling. Women may compete in badminton, cross country, cheerleading, and softball. While not recognized by the IHSA, the school also sponsors a competitive dance team (called Dance Force) for women.

The following teams have won their respective IHSA state championship tournaments:

- Bowling (Girls): 1984-85, 1987–88, 1988–89
- Wrestling: 1972-73

== Activities ==
The school offers 19 clubs and activities for students. One of the more distinctive clubs is Image Makers, a club devoted to experimental artwork, much of which is used to decorate the school.

The theater group meets as a class, in addition to being an activity. Small performances are given in October, with the year's work culminating in a spring musical in May of each year.

In 2009, the Scholastic Bowl team, also known as the Academic Team, hosted the NAQT State Tournament for the first time.

The following non-athletic activities won their respective IHSA sponsored state competitions:

- Drama: 1968-69, 1978–79
- Individual Events: 1978-79

== Notable people ==
- Skye Blue is a professional wrestler currently signed to All Elite Wrestling and its sister promotion Ring of Honor.
- Colin Brady (1987) is an animator with Pixar who has worked as an animator or supervisor on E.T. the Extra-Terrestrial, Toy Story, Toy Story 2, and A Bug's Life.
- Daren Dochterman (1985) is an art designer and illustrator for over 35 feature films including The Abyss, and Star Trek: The Motion Picture.
- Gene L. Hoffman was a Republican member of the Illinois House of Representatives from 1967 to 1991. He taught social studies at Fenton High School during this period.
- Richard Oruche, basketball player for the Nigerian National Basketball Team. He competed in the 2012 Olympic Games. He played basketball for the Fenton Bison.
- Monica Pedersen HGTV designer appearing on “Designed to Sell,” “Bang for Your Buck” and “Dream Home.”
- Jim Spivey (1978), a three-time member of the US Olympic track & field team (1984, 1992, & 1996).
- Genevieve "Audrey" Wagner (1945) was a professional baseball player in the All-American Girls Professional Baseball League, winning the league's batting title in 1948. She later earned an M.D. and pilots license.
