= Addison Township, Illinois =

Addison Township
- Township
- Flag Seal

- Location in DuPage County

- DuPage County's location in Illinois
- Coordinates: 41°56′51″N 87°58′49″W
- Country: United States
- State: Illinois
- County: DuPage
- Settled: November 6, 1849

Government
  - Supervisor: Bobby Hernandez

Area
  - Total: 32.06 sq mi (83.0 km^{2})
  - Land: 31.43 sq mi (81.4 km^{2})
  - Water: 0.63 sq mi (1.6 km^{2}) 1.98%
- Elevation: 682 ft (208 m)

Population (2020)
  - Total: 88,351
  - Density: 2,811/sq mi (1,085/km^{2})
- Time zone: UTC-6 (CST)
  - Summer (DST): UTC-5 (CDT)
- ZIP codes: 60007, 60101, 60106, 60126, 60143, 60148, 60181, 60191
- FIPS code: 17-043-00250
- Website: Addison Township

Addison Township is one of nine townships in DuPage County, Illinois, United States. As of the 2020 census, its population was 88,351 and it contained 32,306 housing units.

== Geography ==
According to the 2021 census gazetteer files, Addison Township has a total area of 32.06 square miles (83.04 km^{2}), of which 31.43 square miles (81.40 km^{2}) (or 98.02%) is land and 0.63 square miles (1.63 km^{2}) (or 1.98%) is water.

=== Cities, towns, and villages ===
- Addison (partial)
- Bensenville (vast majority)
- Elk Grove Village (partial)
- Elmhurst (north quarter)
- Itasca (east three-quarters)
- Lombard (north edge)
- Villa Park (partial)
- Wood Dale

The southwest edge of O'Hare International Airport extends into the township but is a separate incorporated area of the City of Chicago.

=== Unincorporated communities ===
- Churchville at 41.93503°N 87.953954°W

(This list is based on USGS data and may include former settlements.)

== Natural features ==
- Grove Lake

== Landmarks ==
Addison Township contains several forest preserves and recreational sites managed by the Forest Preserve District of DuPage County, including:

- Cricket Creek Forest Preserve
- Fullerton Park Forest Preserve
- Maple Meadows Forest Preserve
- Oak Meadows Golf Course Forest Preserve
- Songbird Slough Forest Preserve
- Wood Dale Grove Forest Preserve

== Transportation ==
=== Major highways ===
- Interstate 290
- Interstate 355
- U.S. Route 20
- Illinois Route 19
- Illinois Route 53
- Illinois Route 64
- Illinois Route 83
- Illinois Route 390

=== Airports and heliports ===
- O'Hare International Airport (partial)
- Patten Industries Heliport

== Cemeteries ==
Addison Township contains eight cemeteries: Arlington, Churchville, Elm Lawn, Fredens, Mount Emblem, Pet Haven, Saint Pauls Addison, and Zion. The former St. Johannes Cemetery was disinterred in 2010 to allow for a runway expansion at O'Hare International Airport.

== Demographics ==
As of the 2020 census there were 88,351 people, 31,942 households, and 23,133 families residing in the township. The population density was 2,755.46 inhabitants per square mile (1,063.89/km^{2}). There were 32,306 housing units at an average density of 1,007.55 per square mile (389.02/km^{2}). The racial makeup of the township was 58.01% White, 2.57% African American, 1.39% Native American, 6.98% Asian, 0.03% Pacific Islander, 17.16% from other races, and 13.87% from two or more races. Hispanic or Latino of any race were 36.15% of the population.

There were 31,942 households, of which 32.8% had children under the age of 18 living with them, 56.1% were married couples living together, 12.1% had a female householder with no spouse present, and 27.6% were non-families. 22.2% of all households were made up of individuals, and 10.0% had someone living alone who was 65 years of age or older. The average household size was 2.77 and the average family size was 3.27.

The township's age distribution consisted of 22.1% under the age of 18, 9.1% from 18 to 24, 25.1% from 25 to 44, 27.5% from 45 to 64, and 16.1% who were 65 years of age or older. The median age was 39.6 years. For every 100 females, there were 99.3 males. For every 100 females age 18 and over, there were 95.6 males.

The median household income was $77,130, and the median family income was $89,211. Males had a median income of $45,931 versus $33,272 for females. The per capita income for the township was $35,164. About 6.2% of families and 8.6% of the population were below the poverty line, including 14.8% of those under age 18 and 7.5% of those age 65 or over.

Historical population
Census	Pop.	Note	%±
1960	41,808		—
1970	72,542		73.5%
1980	82,937		14.3%
1990	82,727		−0.3%
2000	88,902		7.5%
2010	88,612		−0.3%
2020	88,351		−0.3%
U.S. Decennial Census

== Education ==
- Addison School District 4
- Elmhurst Community Unit School District 205
- Fenton Community High School District 100
- DuPage High School District 88 (Addison Trail High School)

== Government ==
Addison Township was established in 1850 from land settled in 1849. The township government provides general assistance, property assessment, and road maintenance for unincorporated areas. The current Supervisor is Bobby Hernandez (elected 2025).

== Political districts ==
- Illinois's 5th congressional district
- Illinois's 8th congressional district
- State Senate District 23
- State Senate District 24
- State Senate District 39
- State House District 45
- State House District 46
- State House District 47
- State House District 77

== See also ==
- DuPage County, Illinois
- List of townships in Illinois
