= Itasca, Illinois =

- Village
- Village of Itasca
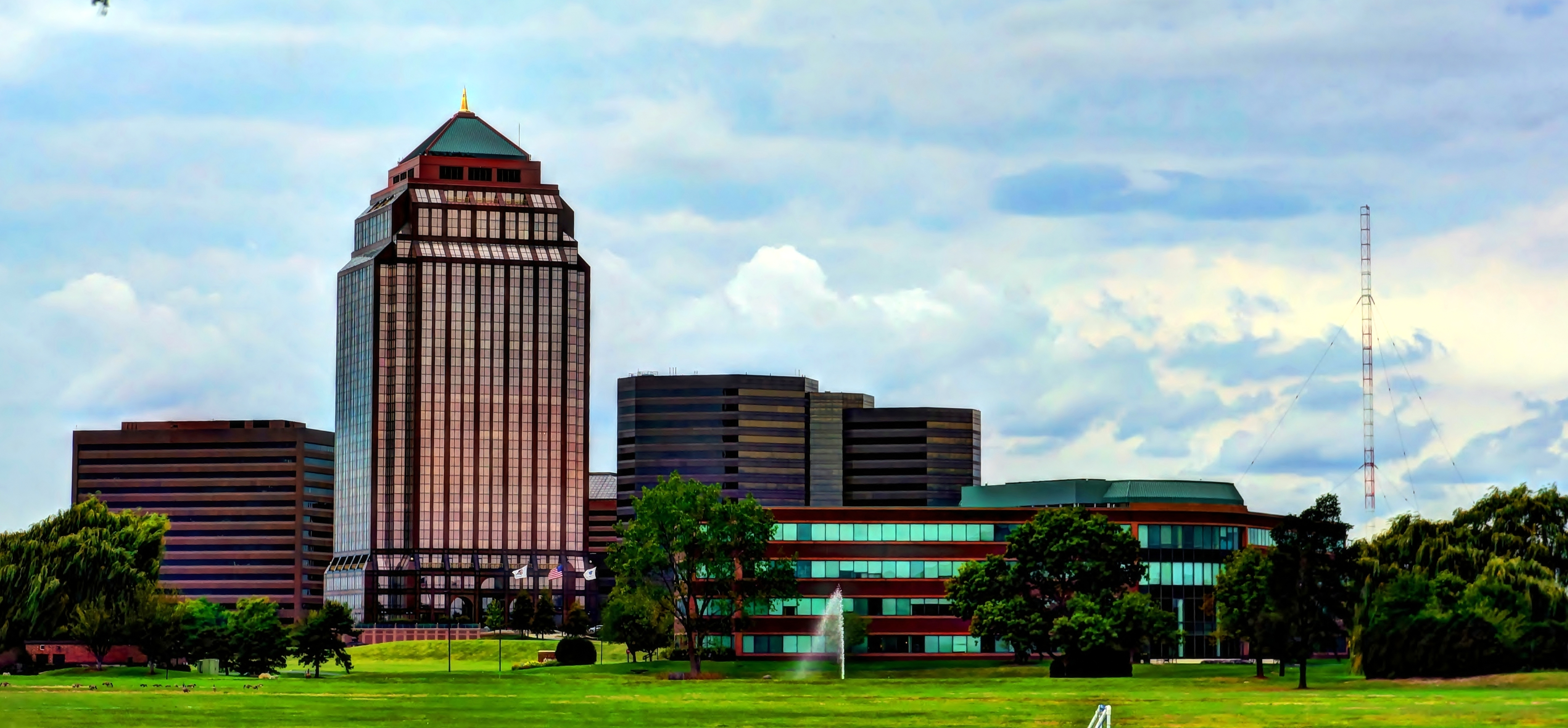
- Hamilton Lakes business district in Itasca

- Flag Seal Logo
- Motto(s): Committed to Our Future, Inspired by Our Past
- Location of Itasca in DuPage County, Illinois
- Coordinates: 41°58′35″N 88°00′20″W
- Country: United States
- State: Illinois
- County: DuPage
- Settled: 1841
- Incorporated: 1890
- Founder: Elijah Smith

Government
  - Type: Board of trustees
  - Mayor: Jeff Pryn

Area
  - Total: 5.14 sq mi (13.32 km^{2})
  - Land: 5.02 sq mi (13.01 km^{2})
  - Water: 0.12 sq mi (0.32 km^{2})
- Elevation: 692 ft (211 m)

Population (2020)
  - Total: 9,543
  - Density: 1,900.3/sq mi (733.72/km^{2})
- Time zone: UTC-6 ((CST))
  - Summer (DST): UTC-5 ((CDT))
- ZIP code: 60143
- Area code(s): 630, 331
- FIPS code: 17-37907
- GNIS feature ID: 2398280
- Website: www.itasca.com

Itasca (/aɪˈtæskə/) is a village in DuPage County, Illinois, United States. Per the 2020 census, the population was 9,543. Located approximately 25 miles northwest of downtown Chicago, Itasca is close to O'Hare International Airport, major expressways and rail transportation. Itasca is home to a country club, a resort, and shares a border with the Medinah Country Club. In 2018, BusinessWeek rated Itasca as the Best Affordable Suburb in the state of Illinois.

== History ==
Itasca was first settled by Elijah Smith in 1841. Smith practiced medicine in Boston. In May 1841, at the advice of his colleagues he set out to find a suitable site for doctoring, farming, and raising a family. He traveled from New York via Detroit and headed toward DuPage County. His parchment government land title dated March 10, 1843, was signed by John Tyler, President of the United States. The document gave Smith title to the land that is now bounded by the railroad tracks on the south, Maple Street on the west, Cherry Street on the east, and Division Street on the north. The post office was established in 1846 and took on various names, such as Bremen, Pierce (after Charles Pierce, who ran a trading post), and Sagon. The name Itasca comes from Lake Itasca. In the 1860s the first school was built. It was a small wooden structure with one room. The building was located on a site near the present First Presbyterian Church.

In 1873 Smith plotted eighty acres of his land into lots. The Chicago and Pacific Railroad was completed from Chicago to Elgin, with stations at Bensenville, Wood Dale (called Lester) and Itasca. Smith gave the right-of-way to encourage location of the tracks through the settlement. He donated $400 to help build a station.

The Chicago and Pacific Railroad became insolvent. In 1880 the road went into the hands of the Chicago, Milwaukee, St. Paul and Pacific Railroad, a newly formed corporation combining several rail networks.

The citizens of Itasca decided in 1890 to incorporate into a village. At a meeting at his mill, A. G. Chessman was elected the first Village President. Irving Park Road was first called the Chicago and Elgin Road. At an 1891 Village Board meeting, the name was changed to Elgin Avenue.

The 1900s

The Village of Itasca created a Historical Commission in 1985 to retain the aesthetic beauty, character, and historical integrity of the Village. The Village of Itasca is committed to the preservation of its pre-1900 and early 1900 homes, buildings, structures, and places.

In 1987, the Village adopted the Historic Preservation Ordinance which provides a mechanism to identify and preserve the special distinctive historic, aesthetic, architectural and/or landscaping characteristics of the Village's cultural, social, economic, political and architectural history.

The Itasca Historical District includes the following area: Bounded on the north by North Street, on the south by Bloomingdale Road, east to Irving Park, Irving Park east to Rush Street; on the east by Cherry Street extended to Schiller Street then west to Rush Street, then south to Irving Park Road and on the west by Catalpa Avenue extended to Bloomingdale Road.

The Spire, which is Itasca's most familiar landmark, graces the top of what was formerly the Lutheran Church of St. Luke. This edifice was erected in 1907 by builder Fred Westendorf. Pastor Frederick Zersen served the congregation for thirty-eight years. Church services were in German. It was not until 1926 that English services were held twice a month. German was also taught in the church school. Until 1916, there was no bank in Itasca. Herman H. Franzen took deposits for Village residents to the Roselle Bank each morning, making the trip regularly on the 9:00 AM train. In 1916, two banks opened within weeks of each other. The Itasca State Bank had as its president H. F. Lawrence. The cashier was Elmer H. Franzen. The second bank was called the Dairyman's Bank of Northern Illinois, and was opened by F. N. Peck. Peck opened a total of four banks, but the Depression forced him to close them all. The Franzen banks in Itasca, Roselle, and Fox Lake were sound throughout the hard times of the 1920s, and emerged successfully from the Depression.

Telephone service had come to Itasca in 1899. Electricity was first installed in some homes in 1923. The bustling community soon gained another facility. The Itasca Country Club was opened in the spring of 1925.

The rural village of the 1800s and early 1900s retained its atmosphere until the 1940s. A new word then began to enter the American vocabulary: suburb. The influence of the city increased as population increased. Commuting daily to the Loop became the routine for many of the Village wage earners. By 1982, the population had grown to 7,192. Annexations had resulted in fifty miles of Village streets, more parks, and two industrial areas to serve. Providing safety and service as population increased required the establishment of departments of public works, of sewer and water, of building and police. A park district, a Village library, and a fire district were formed.

High school students from Itasca attended Bensenville's Fenton High School and Glenbard High School, a combined Glen Ellyn-Lombard school. A high school district, District 108, was organized in 1953. Lake Park High School, with students from Itasca, Roselle, Medinah, Keeneyville and Bloomingdale, opened in September 1956.

Modern industry was foreign to Itasca until 1961 when Central Manufacturing District (CMD) bought about 400 acres on the western edge of the village. An industrial park was established, and such national companies as Continental Can and FMC soon moved in. In 1970, the Itasca Industrial Park was established to the east of the Village, and attracted many more industries.

Anvan Corporation built a Holiday Inn on Irving Park east of Route 53. The building was of modular construction, the first such hotel in the nation to be built in this manner. It was later closed down and proposals to turn it into a drug rehab center were denied in 2024.

In 1969, Carson Pirie Scott purchased Nordic Hills Country Club. Two 10-story tower hotel buildings were constructed adjacent to the eighteen-hole golf course. In 1973, the Carson Inn/Nordic Hills facility was annexed to the village. Today, it is named the Eaglewood Resort, right next to the world renowned, Medinah Country Club.

In October 1979, Trammell Crow Company of Texas broke ground for Hamilton Lakes. A 420-room Stouffer Hotel and a ten-story office building, completed in 1981, constituted the first phase of the project, situated on 278 acres on the northwest edge of Itasca. To date 15 buildings out of an estimated 26 have been completed, amounting to 2,767,589 gross square feet of floor space with an ultimate development of 4,490,700 gross square feet. A 16-story office building was added to the complex in 1984.

In 1966, the Village purchased 60 acres of land south of Irving Park Road. This established a green belt area to ensure both open space and water retention. In 1968 the Spring Brook Nature Center was formed.

Shirley H. Ketter, the first female Mayor of Itasca monumentally served as Village President of Itasca from 1983 to 1997. Former Mayor Ketter is after whom Itasca's Ketter Drive was named in 1999 in honor of her role with the Hamilton Lakes Business Park, which according to Mayor Gigi Gruber, Ketter "created and developed the whole Hamilton project."

Each year Itasca hosts multiple notable events which includes, Itasca Fest, fireworks at Hamilton Lakes, and other events throughout the year. Itasca Fest is the second weekend of July which includes live music, food, beverages, rides, car shows, and more. The Hamilton Lakes fireworks are claimed to be the best and largest in Illinois.

== Geography ==
According to the 2021 census gazetteer files, Itasca has a total area of 5.14 square miles (13.31 km^{2}), of which 5.02 square miles (13.00 km^{2}) (or 97.63%) is land and 0.12 square miles (0.31 km^{2}) (or 2.37%) is water.

=== Surrounding areas ===
Elk Grove
Elk Grove Elk Grove
Medinah Wood Dale
Bloomingdale Wood Dale
Addison

== Demographics ==
Historical population
Census	Pop.	Note	%±
1880	76		—
1900	256		—
1910	333		30.1%
1920	339		1.8%
1930	594		75.2%
1940	787		32.5%
1950	1,274		61.9%
1960	3,564		179.7%
1970	4,638		30.1%
1980	7,129		53.7%
1990	6,947		−2.6%
2000	8,302		19.5%
2010	8,649		4.2%
2020	9,543		10.3%
U.S. Decennial Census; 2010 2020

=== Racial and ethnic composition ===
Itasca village, Illinois – Racial and ethnic composition Note: the US Census treats Hispanic/Latino as an ethnic category. This table excludes Latinos from the racial categories and assigns them to a separate category. Hispanics/Latinos may be of any race.
Race / Ethnicity (NH = Non-Hispanic)	Pop 2000	Pop 2010	Pop 2020	% 2000	% 2010	% 2020
White alone (NH)	6,890	6,707	6,633	82.99%	77.55%	69.51%
Black or African American alone (NH)	140	176	214	1.69%	2.03%	2.24%
Native American or Alaska Native alone (NH)	16	10	13	0.19%	0.12%	0.04%
Asian alone (NH)	484	727	1,029	5.38%	8.41%	10.78%
Pacific Islander alone (NH)	2	1	0	0.02%	0.01%	0.00%
Other race alone (NH)	6	6	37	0.07%	0.07%	0.39%
Mixed race or Multiracial (NH)	183	103	266	2.20%	1.19%	2.79%
Hispanic or Latino (any race)	581	919	1,351	7.00%	10.63%	14.16%
Total	8,302	8,649	9,543	100.00%	100.00%	100.00%

=== 2020 census ===
As of the 2020 census, Itasca had a population of 9,543. The population density was 1,855.17 inhabitants per square mile (716.29/km^{2}). The median age was 40.8 years. 21.4% of residents were under the age of 18 and 17.2% of residents were 65 years of age or older. For every 100 females, there were 96.6 males, and for every 100 females age 18 and over there were 94.8 males age 18 and over. 100.0% of residents lived in urban areas, while 0.0% lived in rural areas.

There were 3,726 households and 2,814 families in Itasca. Of all households, 31.4% had children under the age of 18 living in them, 54.5% were married-couple households, 17.3% were households with a male householder and no spouse or partner present, and 21.8% were households with a female householder and no spouse or partner present. About 24.4% of all households were made up of individuals, and 9.4% had someone living alone who was 65 years of age or older.

There were 3,927 housing units, of which 5.1% were vacant. The homeowner vacancy rate was 0.9% and the rental vacancy rate was 7.9%.

=== Income and poverty ===
The median income for a household in the village was $99,706, and the median income for a family was $106,959. Males had a median income of $59,444 versus $38,333 for females. The per capita income for the village was $53,551. About 1.7% of families and 4.1% of the population were below the poverty line, including 4.8% of those under age 18 and 3.3% of those age 65 or over.

== Neighborhoods ==
The Itasca Baptist Church, across the street from Usher Park and its gazebo, is an Itasca landmark.

Itasca's residential neighborhoods, for the most part, straddle the railroad tracks running through the village. The railroad splits the town into the "North Side" and the "South Side". (Itasca has two unincorporated neighborhoods west of Rohlwing Road: Nordic Park near the intersection of Rohlwing and Bloomingdale Roads, and the Ranchettes near the intersection of Rohlwing and Irving Park Roads).

The four main are only four railroad crossings in Itasca, from west to east: IL 53/Rohlwing Road, Catalpa Street, Walnut Street, and CR 10/Prospect Avenue and several others in the Industrial Parks.

Walnut Street, between Bloomingdale Road and Division Street, is generally regarded as Itasca's "downtown". The town's landmarks include Itasca Baptist Church, and Usher Park, which is on Walnut Street. A riverwalk was added, and Gigi Gruber Lane is a tribute to former mayor Gigi Gruber. Irving Park Road between Interstate 290 and First Street is also a commercial corridor, as well as the home of the town's Municipal Campus (library, depot museum, pool, fire station, and police station/village hall). West of I-290, Irving Park Road remains commercial, but with more national chain businesses.

== Education ==
Prior to 1995, Itasca's School District 10 had one PreK-5 elementary school on each side of town: Franzen School on the North Side and Raymond Benson Primary School (formerly Washington School) on the South Side. (Upon entering 6th grade, all students attend Peacock Jr. High (later renamed Peacock Middle School) on the town's North Side. Itasca is served by High School District 108, Lake Park High School in nearby Roselle).

Beginning with the 1995–1996 school year, the elementary schools were consolidated: Benson Primary School, formerly Washington School, would become PreK-2nd Grade; Franzen Intermediate School would become 3rd-5th Grades.

St. Peter the Apostle Catholic Church and School offered elementary education in Itasca from 1963 until its closure in 2010.

St. Luke Lutheran Church and School dates back to 1885. The Church and school were relocated to their current location at Washington and Rush street in 1961.

== Economy ==
Arthur J. Gallagher & Co., one of the world's largest insurance brokerage firms, Jewel-Osco (grocery stores), Walter E. Smithe (furniture), and Fellowes, Inc. headquarters are located in Itasca. In 2014, Itasca-based LaunchPoint was ranked #100 in the Inc. magazine list of 5,000 fastest-growing private companies in the U.S. Additionally, PrimeCo had its headquarters in Itasca. In 1946 Hugh S. Knowles founded Knowles Electronics in Itasca. Eaglewood Resort is in Itasca, adjacent to Medinah Country Club. Market Day, a national food cooperative, also has its corporate headquarters in the village.

== Transportation ==
Itasca has a station on Metra's Milwaukee District West Line, which provides daily rail service between Elgin and Chicago Union Station.

The town is also located at the junction of Interstate 290, Veterans Memorial Tollway, and the Elgin-O'Hare Expressway, making Itasca a prime location for commerce and industry in the northwest suburbs.

State Highway 19 (Irving Park Road), which connects Chicago and Elgin, runs east–west through the center of town. State Highway 53 (Rohlwing Road) runs north–south through the western edge of the village.

== Notable people ==
- Bobby Di Cicco, actor
- Camden Murphy, NASCAR driver and monster truck driver
- Diane Pappas, state politician
- Zach Ziemek, Olympic athlete
