= David C. Shapiro =

American dentist and politician (1925–1981)

Member of the Illinois House of Representatives
- In office 1969

Personal details
- Born: February 16, 1925 Mendota, Illinois, U.S.
- Died: August 1, 1981 (aged 56) Livingston, Montana, U.S.
- Party: Republican
- Education: Stanford University; University of Illinois
- Occupation: Politician, dentist

Military service
- Allegiance: United States
- Branch/service: United States Army
- Battles/wars: World War II

David C. Shapiro (February 16, 1925 – August 1, 1981) was an American dentist and politician.

Born in Mendota, Illinois, Shapiro served in the United States Army during World War II. He went to Stanford University. Shapiro then received his bachelor's and dentist degrees from University of Illinois. He was a dentist in Amboy, Illinois. Shapiro served on the Amboy City Council and on the Amboy Unit School Board. Shapiro also president of the Lee County Board of Health. In 1969, Shapiro served in the Illinois House of Representatives and was a Republican. He then served in the Illinois State Senate until his death. Shapiro died at his summer home in Livingston, Montana. He had been ill with cancer and diabetes.
