= Monica Pedersen =

Monica Pedersen is a designer on the show "Designed to Sell". She is the host of HGTV's 2009 Dream Home tour television special.

Monica frequently appears on HGTV's Bang for Your Buck to critique designs made for home renovations.

She hosted the 2011 HGTV Dream Home.
