= Joseph B. Ebbesen =

American politician (1925–2014)

Joseph Bernard Ebbesen (January 12, 1925 – September 7, 2014) was an American politician and optometrist.

Born in DeKalb, Illinois, Ebbesen graduated from the DeKalb Township High School in 1943. He then served in the United States Marine Corps during World War II. He went to the Northern Illinois University and the Illinois College of Optometry. Ebbesen practiced optometry in DeKalb, Illinois. He served on the local board of education and on the DeKalb City Council from 1961 to 1965. From 1965 to 1969, Ebbesen served as mayor of DeKalb and was a Republican. From 1973 to 1985, Ebbesen served in the Illinois House of Representatives. Ebbesen died at his home in DeKalb, Illinois.
