= Bensenville, Illinois =

- Village
- Village of Bensenville
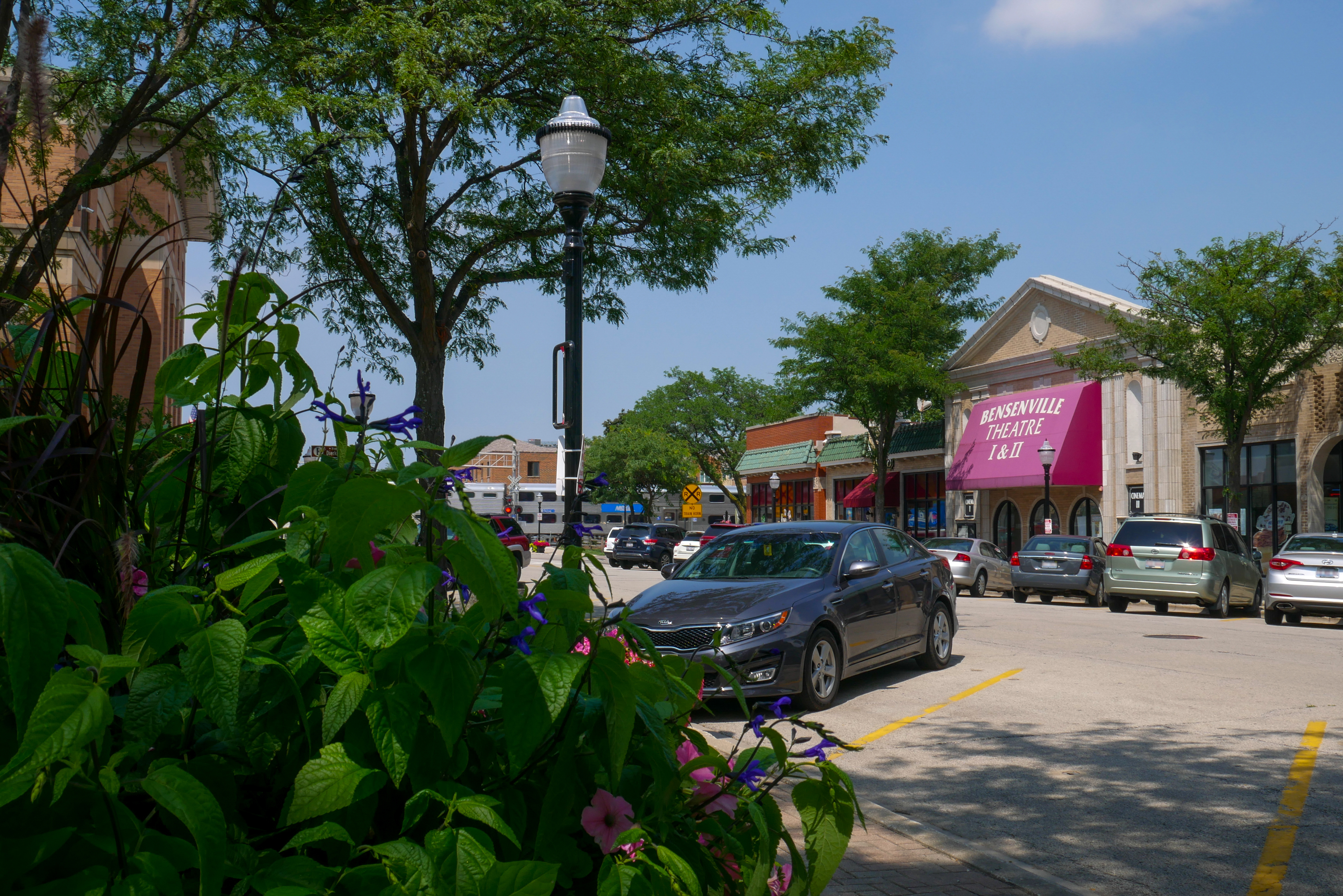
- Downtown Bensenville

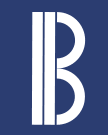
- Flag logo
- Motto: Gateway to Opportunity
- Location of Bensenville in DuPage County and Cook County, Illinois.
- Coordinates: 41°57′29″N 87°56′39″W
- Country: United States
- State: Illinois
- County: DuPage, Cook
- Township: Addison, Leyden
- Established: 1884

Government
  - Type: council–manager

Area
  - Total: 5.58 sq mi (14.46 km^{2})
  - Land: 5.53 sq mi (14.33 km^{2})
  - Water: 0.050 sq mi (0.13 km^{2})
- Elevation: 673 ft (205 m)

Population (2020)
  - Total: 18,813
  - Density: 3,401.3/sq mi (1,313.23/km^{2})
- Time zone: UTC-6 (CST)
  - Summer (DST): UTC-5 (CDT)
- ZIP code: 60106
- Area code(s): 630, 331
- FIPS code: 17-05248
- GNIS feature ID: 2398095
- Website: www.bensenville.gov

Bensenville is a village located near O'Hare International Airport in DuPage County, Illinois, with a portion of the town in Cook County. As of the 2020 census, the village population was 18,813.

First known as Tioga, it was formally established as Bensenville in 1873 along the Milwaukee Road (Canadian Pacific) right-of-way. The community is named after Bensen, Germany, a village in the municipality of Sudwalde. A post office was established in 1873, but because there was an existing "Benson", the suffix "ville" was added.

The Edge Ice Arena is located in Bensenville, former home of the Chicago Steel junior ice hockey team and practices for the Chicago Blackhawks of the National Hockey League (NHL).

The Churchville School in Bensenville is listed on the National Register of Historic Places.

== History ==
The Barker-Karpis Gang used a house on May Street to hide kidnap victims William Hamm Jr. in 1933 and Edward Bremer in 1934, who they had kidnapped from Saint Paul, Minnesota. In 2007, homes and businesses were acquired by the City of Chicago for its O'Hare Modernization Program.

== Geography ==
According to the 2021 census gazetteer files, Bensenville has a total area of 5.58 square miles (14.45 km^{2}), of which 5.53 square miles (14.32 km^{2}) (or 99.09%) is land and 0.05 square miles (0.13 km^{2}) (or 0.91%) is water.

== Demographics ==
Historical population
Census	Pop.	Note	%±
1880	136		—
1890	295		116.9%
1900	374		26.8%
1910	443		18.4%
1920	650		46.7%
1930	1,680		158.5%
1940	1,869		11.3%
1950	3,754		100.9%
1960	9,141		143.5%
1970	12,956		41.7%
1980	16,106		24.3%
1990	17,767		10.3%
2000	20,703		16.5%
2010	18,352		−11.4%
2020	18,813		2.5%
U.S. Decennial Census

=== Racial and ethnic composition ===
Bensenville village, Illinois – Racial and ethnic composition Note: the US Census treats Hispanic/Latino as an ethnic category. This table excludes Latinos from the racial categories and assigns them to a separate category. Hispanics/Latinos may be of any race.
Race / Ethnicity (NH = Non-Hispanic)	Pop 2000	Pop 2010	Pop 2020	% 2000	% 2010	% 2020
White alone (NH)	10,779	7,857	7,065	52.06%	42.81%	37.55%
Black or African American alone (NH)	537	590	735	2.59%	3.21%	3.91%
Native American or Alaska Native alone (NH)	21	31	23	0.10%	0.17%	0.12%
Asian alone (NH)	1,307	872	921	6.31%	4.75%	4.90%
Pacific Islander alone (NH)	5	2	0	0.02%	0.01%	0.00%
Other race alone (NH)	36	41	54	0.17%	0.22%	0.29%
Mixed race or Multiracial (NH)	328	178	317	1.58%	0.97%	1.69%
Hispanic or Latino (any race)	7,690	8,781	9,698	37.14%	47.85%	51.55%
Total	20,703	18,352	18,813	100.00%	100.00%	100.00%

=== 2020 census ===
As of the 2020 census, Bensenville had a population of 18,813 people, with 4,274 families residing in the village. The median age was 37.0 years. 23.1% of residents were under the age of 18 and 14.0% were 65 years of age or older. For every 100 females, there were 105.3 males, and for every 100 females age 18 and over, there were 104.1 males age 18 and over.

100.0% of residents lived in urban areas, while 0.0% lived in rural areas.

There were 6,538 households, of which 34.5% had children under the age of 18 living in them. Of all households, 45.0% were married-couple households, 23.5% were households with a male householder and no spouse or partner present, and 23.9% were households with a female householder and no spouse or partner present. About 27.0% of all households were made up of individuals, and 11.0% had someone living alone who was 65 years of age or older.

There were 6,864 housing units, of which 4.7% were vacant. The homeowner vacancy rate was 0.8% and the rental vacancy rate was 6.2%.

=== Demographic estimates ===
In an earlier estimate, 35.84% of households were non-families. The average household size was 3.40 and the average family size was 2.70.

In an earlier estimate, 9.4% of residents were between the ages of 18 and 24, 28.8% were between 25 and 44, and 25.5% were between 45 and 64.

=== Income and poverty ===
The median income for a household in the village was $64,401, and the median income for a family was $77,151. Males had a median income of $39,310 versus $32,728 for females. The per capita income for the village was $27,530. About 7.4% of families and 10.2% of the population were below the poverty line, including 19.6% of those under age 18 and 6.7% of those age 65 or over.

== Economy ==
=== Top employers ===
According to Bensenville's 2023 Annual Comprehensive Financial Report, the top employers in the village are:

#	Employer	# of Employees
1	US Foods	400
2	Fortune Fish & Gourmet	350
3	Expeditors International	300
4	AMTAB Manufacturing Co.	250
5	Victor Envelope Manufacturing Co.	220
6	Allmetal, Inc	200
6	Chicago White Metal Casting, Inc.	200
7	Ewing-Doherty Mechanical Inc.	200
8	UPS Freight Services	200
8	The Protectoseal Co.	200

== Education ==
Bensenville School District 100:

- Fenton High School which serves both Bensenville and Wood Dale

Bensenville School District 2:

- Blackhawk Middle School
- Tioga School
- W.A. Johnson School

Private:

- Zion-Concord Lutheran School, Private 3-year-old Preschool through 8th grade.

== Transportation ==
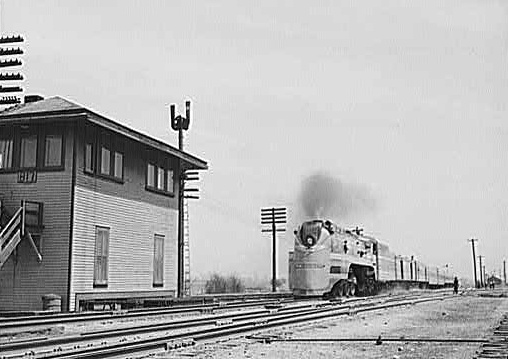
The "Midwest Hiawatha" traveling through Bensenville, 1943

Bensenville has a station on Metra's Milwaukee District West Line, which provides daily rail service between Elgin and Chicago (at Union Station). From there, passengers can connect to Amtrak trains.

Pace provides bus service on Routes 223, 319 and 332 connecting Bensenville to Elmhurst, Rosemont, and other destinations.

== In popular culture ==
Bensenville is the site of Victory Auto Wreckers, a 7-acre (2.8 ha) auto recycling facility on Green Street which has repeatedly aired the "door-falling-off-the-car" commercial, starring Bob Zajdel, on Chicago television stations since 1981.

Bensenville is mentioned by name in the movie Flatliners, and a scene was filmed at the old green house that was next to Blackhawk Junior High School in 1990.

== Sister cities ==
- Zihuatanejo, Guerrero, Mexico

== Notable people ==
- Daren Dochterman is an art designer and illustrator for over 35 feature films.
- Marcin Kleczynski, Polish-born Malwarebytes CEO who grew up in Bensenville.
- Richard Oruche, basketball player for the Nigerian National Basketball Team.
- William A. Redmond was a Democratic member of the Illinois House of Representatives.
- Genevieve "Audrey" Wagner was a baseball player in the All-American Girls Professional Baseball League
