= ATHS =

ATHS may refer to:

- Addison Trail High School, Addison, Illinois, United States
- Alief Taylor High School, Alief, Texas, United States
- Arts and Technology High School, Wilsonville, Oregon, United States
