= Otto A. Buck =

American politician

Otto A. Buck was a Republican state legislator in Illinois. He represented the 41st District (DuPage County) in the Illinois House of Representatives between 1931 and 1933. Before that, he was the President of Villa Park, Illinois.
