= Elmhurst Great Western Prairie =

Prairie remnant in Elmhurst, Illinois, US

Coordinates: 41.8858°N 87.9525°W

The Elmhurst Great Western Prairie (EGWP) is a six-acre, one mile long prairie remnant located immediately north of the Illinois Prairie Path in Elmhurst, Illinois. The EGWP has been maintained largely by volunteers since 1977 and is owned by the Elmhurst Park District.

The Elmhurst Great Western Prairie is a small plot of land that, through incomplete land allocation, has been allowed to remain undisturbed since before Elmhurst was first settled. The EGWP is located between two abandoned railway beds, the Chicago Great Western Railway on the north and the Chicago Aurora and Elgin Railroad to the south.

== Plants of the EGWP ==
According to a 1977 survey conducted by the Elmhurst Prairie Project, the following plants are present there:

- Allium canadense (wild onion)
- Allium cernuum (nodding wild onion)
- Andropogon gerardi (big bluestem)
- Andropogon scoparius (little bluestem)
- Apocynum sibiricum (dogbane)
- Anemone canadensis (meadow anemone)
- Anemone cylindrica (thimbleweed)
- Aster ericoides (heath aster)
- Aster laevis (smooth blue aster)
- Aster novae-angliae (New England aster)
- Aster praealtus (willow aster)
- Aster simplex (panicled aster)
- Calamagrostis canadensis (blue joint grass)
- Cirsium discolor (pasture thistle)
- Comandra richardsiana (false toadflax)
- Coreopsis palmata (prairie coreopsis)
- Dodecatheon meadia (shooting star)
- Equisetum arvense (horsetail)
- Equisetum hyemale (scouring rush)
- Erigeron philadelphicus (marsh fleabane)
- Erigeron strigosus (daisy fleabane)
- Eryngium yuccifolium (rattlesnake master)
- Eupatorium serotinum (late boneset)
- Fragaria virginiana (wild strawberry)
- Galium obtusum (wild madder)
- Gentiana puberula (prairie gentian)
- Helenium autumnale (sneezeweed)
- Helianthus grosseserratus (sawtooth sunflower)
- Heuchera richardsonii (alum root)
- Hypoxis hirsuta (yellow star grass)
- Iris virginica (blue flag)
- Lespedeza capitata (round-headed bush clover)
- Lithospermum canescens (hoary puccoon)
- Lysimachia lanceolata (lance-leaved loosestrife)
- Monarda fistulosa (wild bergamot)
- Panicum leibergii (prairie panic grass)
- Panicum virgatum (switchgrass)
- Persicaria amphibia (water knotweed)
- Phlox pilosa (prairie phlox)
- Physostegia virginiana (false dragonhead)
- Polygonum coccineum (water heartsease)
- Potentilla simplex (common cinquefoil)
- Pycnanthemum virginianum (mountain mint)
- Ratibida pinnata (yellow coneflower)
- Rosa carolina (pasture rose)
- Rudbeckia hirta (black-eyed Susan)
- Silphium terebinthinaceum (prairie dock)
- Sisyrinchium albidum (blue-eyed grass)
- Solidago juncea (early goldenrod)
- Solidago rigida (stiff goldenrod)
- Sorghastrum nutans (Indian grass)
- Spartina pectinata (prairie cord grass)
- Sporobolus heterolepis (prairie dropseed)
- Stipa spartea (porcupine grass)
- Tephrosia virginiana (hoary pea)
- Thalictrum dasycarpum (purple meadow rue)
- Tradescantia ohiensis (common spiderwort)
- Veronicastrum virginicum (Culver's root)
- Vicia americana (American vetch)
- Viola papilionacea (common blue violet)
- Viola pedatifida (prairie violet)
- Zizia aurea (golden Alexander)
