= Pasquesi =

Pasquesi is a surname. Notable people with the surname include:

- David Pasquesi (born 1960), American actor and comedian
- Tony Pasquesi (1933–2016), American football player
