= Arts & Technology High School =

Arts & Technology High School may refer to one of several high schools in the United States:

- Marysville Arts & Technology High School — Marysville School District in Washington state
- Arts and Technology High School — Wilsonville, Oregon
