= DuPage High School District 88 =

School district in Illinois, United States

Address
- 2 Friendship Plaza Addison, Illinois, 60101; United States

District information
- Type: Public school district
- Motto: Building Futures
- Grades: 9–12
- Superintendent: Dr. Jean Barbanente
- Asst. superintendent(s): Veronica Noyola; Michael Bolden; Yvonne Tsagalis
- Schools: 2
- NCES District ID: 1713940

Students and staff
- Students: 4,075
- Teachers: 243
- Staff: 1,250
- Student–teacher ratio: 16.77

Other information
- Website: www.dupage88.net

DuPage High School District 88 (DuPage HSD 88) is a public high school district headquartered in Addison, Illinois. It serves portions of Addison, Villa Park, Oakbrook Terrace and Lombard. The district has two schools. As of 2018, it had 4,075 students.

== Schools ==
- Addison Trail High School
- Willowbrook High School
