= Enrique Cruz Jr. =

American football player (born 2003)

No. 69 – San Francisco 49ers
- Position: Offensive tackle
- Roster status: Active

Personal information
- Born: August 4, 2003 (age 23); Chicago, Illinois, U.S.
- Listed height: 6 ft 5 in (1.96 m)
- Listed weight: 313 lb (142 kg)

Career information
- High school: Willowbrook (Villa Park, Illinois)
- College: Syracuse (2021–2024); Kansas (2025)
- NFL draft: 2026: 5th round, 179th overall pick

Career history
- San Francisco 49ers (2026–present)
- Stats at Pro Football Reference

Enrique Antonio Cruz Jr. (born August 4, 2003) is an American professional football offensive tackle for the San Francisco 49ers of the National Football League (NFL). He played college football for the Syracuse Orange and the Kansas Jayhawks and was selected by the 49ers in the fifth round of the 2026 NFL draft.

== Early life ==
Cruz Jr. attended Willowbrook High School located in Villa Park, Illinois. Coming out of high school, he was rated as a three-star recruit by 247Sports where he committed to play college football for the Syracuse Orange over offers from other schools such as Arizona, Indiana, Louisville, Mississippi State, Oklahoma State, Utah, Wake Forest, and West Virginia.

== College career ==
=== Syracuse ===
Cruz Jr. used the 2021 season to redshirt, as he did not appear in any games. In the 2022 regular season finale, he was ejected after throwing multiple punches at defensive end Donovan Ezeiruaku. In the 2022 season, Cruz Jr. started five games at right and left tackle. During the 2023 season, he took over as the Orange's starting left tackle, making all 13 starts. After playing in just three games in 2024, Cruz Jr. entered the NCAA transfer portal after the conclusion of the season.

=== Kansas ===
Cruz Jr. transferred to play for the Kansas Jayhawks. He entered the 2025 season, as the Jayhawks starting right tackle, finishing the year making all 12 starts. After the conclusion of the season, Cruz Jr. declared for the 2026 NFL draft, while also accepting an invite to participate in the 2026 NFL Scouting Combine.

== Professional career ==
Pre-draft measurables
| Height | Weight | Arm length | Hand span | Wingspan | 40-yard dash | 10-yard split | 20-yard split | Vertical jump | Broad jump |
|---|---|---|---|---|---|---|---|---|---|
| 6 ft 5 1/2 in (1.97 m) | 313 lb (142 kg) | 33 3/4 in (0.86 m) | 10 1/4 in (0.26 m) | 6 ft 10 3/4 in (2.10 m) | 4.94 s | 1.74 s | 2.88 s | 35.0 in (0.89 m) | 9 ft 8 in (2.95 m) |
All values from NFL Combine

Cruz was selected by the San Francisco 49ers in the fifth round with the 179th overall pick in the 2026 NFL draft. On May 8, he signed his rookie deal with the 49ers.

== Personal life ==
Cruz is of Puerto Rican descent.
