= Great Western Trail (Illinois) =

Rail trail in Illinois, United States

Coordinates: 41.97685°N 88.20511°W

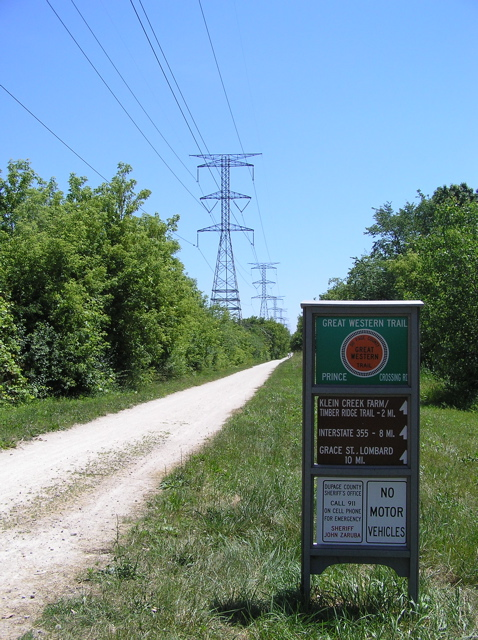
- Eastern section of the Great Western Trail at Prince Crossing in West Chicago, at the western terminus, June 2006
- Length: 30.7 mi (49.4 km)
- Established: 1980s
- Trailheads: Sycamore, Lombard, Villa Park
- Use: bicycling, inline skating, walking, cross country skiing
- Difficulty: easy, level, ADA accessible
- Surface: asphalt, crushed stone, concrete

Trail map
- Western Branch Eastern Branch

The Great Western Trail is a rail trail in Illinois, United States.

== Description ==
The trail occupies three non-contiguous sections of an abandoned Chicago Great Western Railway corridor in suburban Chicago and a section in Iowa that have been converted into biking and hiking trails. The Illinois Prairie Path trail is nearby.

== Western section ==
The westernmost, and older, section of the Great Western Trail is located between western St. Charles in Kane County and eastern Sycamore in DeKalb County. This section was right-of-way that was abandoned in 1977. The 18-mile (29 km) path of fine crushed stone traverses unincorporated rural townships, natural wetlands, some restored prairies, and farmland. The trail also passes through Virgil and Lily Lake and parallels Illinois Route 64.

== Eastern section ==
The newer of the two sections, between Villa Park and West Chicago in DuPage County, is made up of right-of-way that was abandoned piecemeal throughout the 1980s and early 1990s. As the railway was abandoned, the government of DuPage County made upgrades to the path, and between 1990 through 1992, the trail was converted from a rail grade to a bicycle trail. The 12.7-mile (20.4 km) crushed stone path crosses some farmland and suburban areas. At the east end of the trail is a restored former CGW depot building. The Great Western trail also was extended to make a connection with the Illinois Prairie Path in 1995. In 1998, a new bridge was built over Interstate 355, while the next year, a new bridge was built over the West Branch of the DuPage River.

A three-bridge pedestrian overpass, completed in 2012 in Lombard, spans St. Charles Road, the Metra Union Pacific West Line tracks and Grace Street. The Lombard bridge complex is approximately 2 miles east of the Interstate 355 bridge, and these four bridges unify the eastern four miles of the trail. This eastern section of Great Western Trail starts at Villa Avenue in Villa Park joined to the Illinois Prairie Path and rejoins the Illinois Prairie Path just west of Prince Crossing Road in West Chicago.

In 2018, the trail was extended further west to Sassafras Drive in West Chicago. The Great Western Trail is designated as DuPage County Highway 55 for its entire length.

== See also ==
- Forest Preserve District of DuPage County
- Salt Creek Trail
