= Mark Rodenhauser =

American football player (born 1961)

No. 51, 60, 64, 52, 63, 61
- Positions: Center, long snapper

Personal information
- Born: June 1, 1961 (age 65); Elmhurst, Illinois, U.S.
- Listed height: 6 ft 5 in (1.96 m)
- Listed weight: 265 lb (120 kg)

Career information
- High school: Addison Trail (IL)
- College: Illinois State
- NFL draft: 1984: undrafted
- Expansion draft: 1995: 17th round, 34th overall pick

Career history
- Michigan Panthers (1984)*; Chicago Bruisers (1987); Chicago Bears (1987); Minnesota Vikings (1989); San Diego Chargers (1990–1991); Chicago Bears (1992); Detroit Lions (1993–1994); Carolina Panthers (1995–1997); Pittsburgh Steelers (1998); Seattle Seahawks (1999)
- * Offseason or practice squad member only

Career NFL statistics
- Games played: 168
- Games started: 3
- Stats at Pro Football Reference

Career AFL statistics
- Tackles: 1
- Stats at ArenaFan.com

Mark Todd Rodenhauser (born June 1, 1961) is an American former professional football player who was a center for 13 seasons in the National Football League (NFL) with seven different teams. He played college football for the Illinois State Redbirds. He was selected in the 17th round (34th overall) by the Carolina Panthers in the 1995 NFL expansion draft. Rodenhauser started his football career with the Chicago Bruisers of the Arena Football League (AFL). He also made an appearance in the popular series Football Follies, in the 21st Century Follies DVDs, where he could snap a football a full-length of a basketball court.
