= May Theilgaard Watts =

American writer, illustrator, and teacher

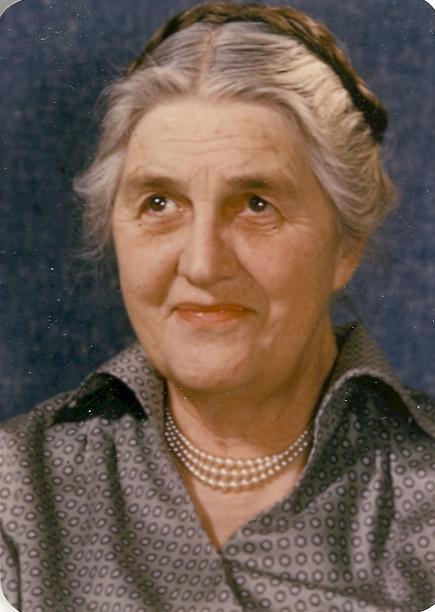
- Born: May 1, 1893; Chicago, Illinois, U.S.
- Died: 20 August 1975 (aged 82); Naperville, Illinois, U.S.
- Education: B.S., University of Chicago (botany, ecology); School of the Art Institute of Chicago
- Employer: The Morton Arboretum
- Known for: Botany, illustration, poetry, natural history and outdoor education
- Spouse: Raymond Watts

May Petrea Theilgaard Watts (1 May 1893 – 20 August 1975) was an American naturalist, writer, poet, illustrator, and educator. She was a naturalist at The Morton Arboretum in Lisle, Illinois, and author of Reading the Landscape of America.

She is credited with proposing in 1963 what ultimately developed as a national rails-to-trails program. She argued for preservation of abandoned railroad rights-of-way for public use, and helped gain the development of the Illinois Prairie Path.

== Early life ==
Born May Petrea Theilgaard, she was one of four daughters of Danish immigrants, Hermann and Claudia (Anderson) Theilgaard. Her father was a garden designer and first introduced her to plants and botany, teaching her Latin names before she learned common names. She grew up in the Ravenswood neighborhood of Chicago, Illinois and attended Lake View High School.

== Education and early career ==
Theilgard began her teaching career in 1911, at the age of 18, as a public school teacher. She taught at several locations in northeastern Illinois between 1911 and 1924: Midlothian, Arlington Heights, Wilmette, and her alma mater in Chicago, Lake View High School.

She attended college during the summers at the University of Chicago, where she studied botany and ecology under Henry Chandler Cowles. In 1916, Watts went on a field trip with Cowles and other ecology students that "toured the Lake Superior region...In five weeks, the party visited sixteen towns, observed climax forests, hydrarch, bog, xerarch, and retrogressive successions, and identified numerous plants. When she returned home, [she] transformed her field notes into an eighty-seven-page expedition notebook with hand-drawn maps, photographs, and plant lists." Watts has credited Cowles as a great inspiration in her later works.

She graduated in 1918 from the University of Chicago with a Bachelor of Science and was elected to Phi Beta Kappa. She married Raymond Watts, an engineer and aviator, on December 27, 1924. Watts studied at the School of the Art Institute of Chicago in 1925.

== Environmental activist and educator ==
May Theilgaard Watts moved in 1927 with her family moved to Ravinia, Illinois (now annexed into Highland Park, Illinois). She became associated with a group working to preserve natural landscapes called "Friends of Our Native Landscape", led by her neighbor Jens Jensen. She began speaking at local garden clubs about issues of local ecology and natural area preservation. Jensen, Watts, and others worked to preserve the natural beauty of Ravinia's ravine landscape and advocated for the use of native plants in garden design.

She and her husband had a house built at 487 Groveland, Highland Park. The architect was John S. Van Bergen and the landscape architect was Jens Jensen. This property is listed on the National Register of Historic Places.

In 1939 Watts began working as a part-time teacher at The Morton Arboretum in Lisle, Illinois; she was hired as a full-time staff naturalist in 1942. Watts developed popular educational programming at the Arboretum, including studies in botany, ecology, taxonomy, geology, gardening, sketching, nature literature, and creative writing. She also produced scientific studies and flower and tree identification guides.

While working at the Arboretum, she wrote several books and guides that helped nonscientists to interpret the landscape. Her Reading the Landscape (1957) was among the most widely read and used for decades by educators. Watts described places ranging from backyard gardens to the Indiana Dunes to the Rocky Mountain timberline. She wrote a similar volume, Reading the Landscape of Europe (1971). She also offered her knowledge of the natural world to the public in a column written for the Chicago Tribune, called Nature Afoot. She presented an educational horticulture program on public television. After she had a stroke in 1961, she retired from the Arboretum that year.

Watts led efforts to establish the Illinois Prairie Path on an abandoned railroad line, which stimulated the development of the rails-to-trails programs across the country. Inspired by the public footpaths of Britain and by the Appalachian Trail in the eastern United States, she believed Midwestern residents needed similar recreational trails and argued for the preservation of railroad rights-of-way for public purposes. Her 1963 letter-to-the-editor of the Chicago Tribune warned that "bulldozers are drooling" and rapid action needed to be taken. She was honored at the 1971 dedication ceremony for the Illinois Prairie Path.

== Awards ==
Watts has been honored with numerous awards:

- 1954, Margaret Douglas Medal for conservation education, Garden Club of America
- 1965, Du Page Audubon Society, President's Award
- 1966, Illinois Parks and Recreation, Special Citation
- 1971, American Horticultural Society, Citation Award for Teaching
- 1971, U.S. Department of the Interior, National Trails Symposium award
- 1972, Chicago Geographic Society's Book of the Year Award for Reading the Landscape of America
- 1972, Illinois House of Representatives citation
- 1972, Hutchinson Medal, Chicago Horticultural Society
- 1972, Arthur Hoyt Scott Medal, Swarthmore College
- 2011, Doppelt Family Rail-Trail Champion

== Death and legacy ==
May Theilgaard Watts died at the age of 82 on August 20, 1975, in Naperville, Illinois.

The May T. Watts Nature Park in Highland Park, May Watts Pond, May Watts Elementary School in Naperville, and the May T. Watts Reading Garden (dedicated in 1963) at The Morton Arboretum are named in her honor.

== Partial bibliography ==
- Tree Finder: A Pocket Manual for Identification of Trees by Their Leaves (Naperville, Ill.: Nature Study Guild, 1939).
- Flower Finder: A Guide to Identification of Spring Wild Flowers and Flower Families (Naperville, Ill.: Nature Study Guild, 1955).
- Reading the Landscape: An Adventure in Ecology (New York: Macmillan, 1957).
- Reading the landscape of Europe (New York: Harper & Row, 1971).

(published in Britain as "The Countryside Around You"; London: Cassel, 1973)

- Reading the Landscape of America (New York: Macmillan, 1975).

(updated edition of Reading the Landscape: An Adventure in Ecology)
