= Kathleen Willis =

American politician

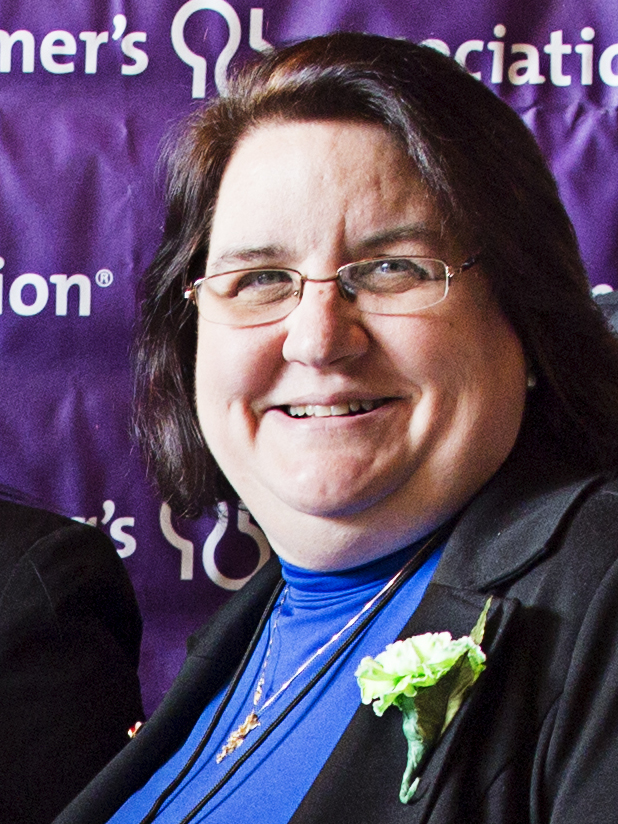
- Willis in 2013

Member of the Illinois House of Representatives from the 77th district
- In office January 2013 – January 2023
- Preceded by: "Skip" Saviano
- Succeeded by: Norma Hernandez

Personal details
- Born: 1962 (age 63–64)
- Party: Democratic
- Education: Elmhurst College (BA); University of Illinois (MLIS)
- Profession: Librarian

Kathleen Willis (born 1962) was the Illinois state representative for the 77th district from 2013 to 2023. The 77th district includes all or parts of Addison, Bellwood, Bensenville, Franklin Park, Maywood, Melrose Park, Northlake, Stone Park, and Wood Dale.

== Early life and education ==
Kathleen Willis was born and raised in Addison, Illinois. A resident of Addison with her husband and four children, she volunteered as Vice President of the Addison Kiwanis, and an organizer for Dare to Dream, an organization that encourages and assists young Hispanic women in attending college and as a member of the Addison District 4 school board. While on the school board, Willis advocated for lower property taxes, more streamlined school administration and quality education . She also earned a bachelor's in Human Service Administration from Elmhurst College and a master's degree in Library and Information Services from the University of Illinois during her school board tenure.

== Illinois State Representative ==
In late 2011, Willis announced her intention to run for state representative in the newly drawn 77th district during which she was endorsed by, among others, Senator Martin Sandoval and the Illinois Sierra Club. Willis defeated twenty-year incumbent Skip Saviano by over 1,000 votes. Upon being sworn in, Representative Willis joined a bipartisan group of lawmakers who chose not to accept a pension.

In her first term, two of her bills were signed into law by the Governor of Illinois. The first was a bill designed to improve the student placement process for special education signed into law. The second was a bill that prevents minors from purchasing e-cigarettes. Other legislation sponsored by Representative Willis that was signed into law includes legislation that would enhance the penalties for individuals who defraud or attempt to defraud Medicaid, increase the penalty for domestic battery if the abuser is a repeat offender, and create the Young Adults Heroin Use Task Force to address the growing problem of heroin use in high schools in Illinois.

She has also advocated for legislation to prevent gang recruitment by making the practice illegal on school buses, bus stops and public parks, lower crime by prohibiting violent felons from purchasing body armor, and co-sponsored a bill to protect consumers from unfair surcharges.

In 2018, J. B. Pritzker appointed Willis to the gubernatorial transition's Restorative Justice and Safe Communities Committee.

As of July 3, 2022, Representative Willis is a member of the following Illinois House committees:

- (Chairwoman of) Adoption & Child Welfare Committee (HACW)
- Appropriations - Human Services Committee (HAPH)
- (Chairwoman of) Child Care Access & Early Childhood Education Committee (HCEC)
- Counties & Townships Committee (HCOT)
- Elementary & Secondary Education: School Curriculum & Policies Committee (HELM)
- Judiciary - Criminal Committee (HJUC)
- Labor & Commerce Committee (HLBR)
- Minority Impact Analysis Subcommittee (HLBR-MIAS)
- Wage Policy & Study Subcommittee (HLBR-WAGE)

On June 28, 2022, Willis was not renominated to retain her seat in the Illinois House. She was defeated in the Democratic primary by Norma Hernandez.

== Electoral history ==
Illinois 77th State House District Democratic Primary, 2012
Party	Candidate	Votes	%
Democratic	Kathleen Willis	2,351	100
Total votes		2,351	100.0

Illinois House 77th District General Election, 2012
Party	Candidate	Votes	%
Democratic	Kathleen Willis	13,708	53
Republican	Angelo "Skip" Saviano (incumbent)	12,357	47
Democratic gain from Republican			

Illinois 77th State House District Democratic Primary, 2014
Party	Candidate	Votes	%
Democratic	Kathleen Willis (incumbent)	3,272	77.57
Democratic	Antonio "Tony" Favela	946	22.43
Total votes		4,218	100.0

Illinois 77th State House District General Election, 2014
Party	Candidate	Votes	%
Democratic	Kathleen Willis (incumbent)	12,488	100
Total votes		12,488	100.0

Illinois 77th State House District General Election, 2016
Party	Candidate	Votes	%
Democratic	Kathleen Willis (incumbent)	20,806	70.37
Republican	Anthony Airdo	8,762	29.63
Total votes		29,568	100.0

Illinois 77th State House District General Election, 2018
Party	Candidate	Votes	%
Democratic	Kathleen Willis (incumbent)	15,420	70.58
Republican	Anthony Airdo	6,429	29.42
Total votes		21,849	100.0

Illinois 77th State House District General Election, 2020
Party	Candidate	Votes	%
Democratic	Kathleen Willis (incumbent)	21,772	67.19
Republican	Anthony Airdo	10,631	32.81
Total votes		32,403	100.0

Illinois 77th State House District Democratic Primary, 2022
Party	Candidate	Votes	%
Democratic	Norma Hernandez	2,484	51.83
Democratic	Kathleen Willis (incumbent)	2,309	48.17
Total votes		7,479	100.0
