= Willowbrook High School =

Public secondary school in Villa Park, Illinois, US

Location
- 1250 South Ardmore Avenue; Villa Park, Illinois 60181; United States
- 41.8647°N 87.9825°W

Information
- School type: public secondary
- Opened: 1959; 67 years ago
- School district: DuPage HSD 88
- Superintendent: Jean Barbanente
- CEEB code: 144232
- NCES School ID: 171394001738
- Principal: Daniel Krause
- Staff: 116.32 (FTE)
- Grades: 9–12
- Gender: co-ed
- Enrollment: 1,952 (2023–2024)
- Average class size: 24.5
- Student to teacher ratio: 16.78
- Campus: suburban
- Campus size: 44 acres
- Colours: columbia blue silver
- Fight song: Fight Roman Warriors
- Athletics conference: West Suburban Conference
- Mascot: Willy the Warrior
- Nickname: Warriors
- Publication: Mindprints
- Newspaper: Skyline
- Yearbook: Centurion
- Website: www.dupage88.net/site/sub/3

Willowbrook High School (WBHS) is a public four-year high school in Villa Park, Illinois, a western suburb of Chicago, Illinois. The school is located approximately half a mile north of Illinois Route 38 on Ardmore Ave. It is a part of the DuPage High School District 88, which also includes Addison Trail High School. Willowbrook draws its students from Villa Park, Oakbrook Terrace, and portions of Elmhurst, Oak Brook and Lombard.

== History ==
Planning for the school began as early as 1950 when projected growth for the area suggested that a new high school would soon be needed. In January, 1958, the school board not only decided that the new school was to be called Willowbrook (referring to a nearby creek running through a stand of weeping willow trees), but that the school would be prepared to admit students in all four grades once the school opened in 1959.

When the school opened, the principal drafted a group of upperclassmen to help shape the schools traditions (colors, team nickname, student council constitution, etc.). Until the middle of the 1969–1970 school year, students were required to follow a dress code which prohibited (among other things) jeans for all students and long hair for young men.

In 1961, a bust of what was alleged to be Thomas Jefferson but has since been determined to be German Composer, Franz Joseph Hayden was added to the southeast wall of the school's music wing. The bust had been recovered from the demolition of the Louis Sullivan designed Garrick Theater in Chicago by relatives of a (then) current student who were contractors in the theater's demolition.

In 1963, a north wing was added, including district offices located on the first floor portion of the wing.

In the 1980s, improved vocational education areas were added, as was a greenhouse, and expansion of the library.

In 2007, a referendum was passed to make infrastructure improvements and help improve the students' learning environment. Groundbreaking began the week of June 9, 2008 and continued year-round. Some holidays were ignored in order to allow construction to be continue longer during summer recesses. Such improvements included the expansion of music facilities, addition of a fieldhouse and other athletic areas, enhancements to existing science labs, mass improvement to electrical/plumbing, technological enhancements, a more student-centered foyer/commons and guidance areas, renovation to the library/media center, expansion of learning spaces and classrooms, installation of air-conditioning, enhancement to traffic flow and parking, the updating of handicap accessibility, and funds put toward the improvement of the auditorium/drama facilities.

In 2008, the district offices were relocated from the first floor of the north wing to the building previously used by the Addison Public Library.

In 2010, referendum totals came out to be $115.3 million among Willowbrook and sister school Addison Trail High School. After completion of "Building the Future" in the Fall of 2010, dedication ceremonies were held at Willowbrook and Addison Trail on October 17, 2010.

== Academics ==
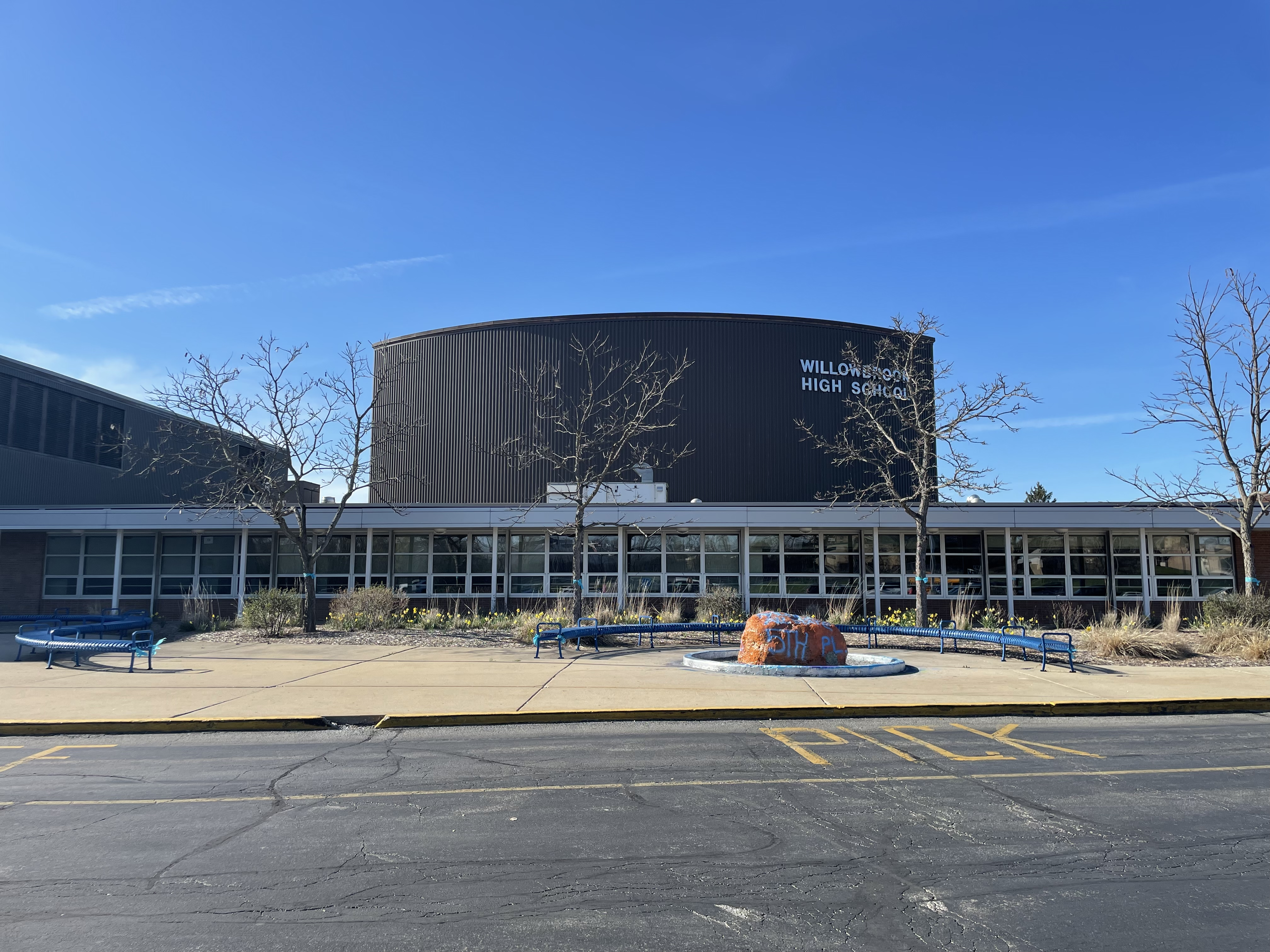
Willowbrook High School in 2024

In 2008, Willowbrook had an average composite ACT score of 21.6 and graduated 94.2% of its senior class. Willowbrook made Adequate Yearly Progress (AYP) on the Prairie State Achievement Examination, which with the ACT, are used as the assessment tools to fulfill the federal No Child Left Behind Act.

In June 2009, Newsweek, using the Challenge Index, ranked Willowbrook #1464 on their annual list of top American high schools. The school had been on the list once before; ranked #1343 in 2008.

== Student life ==
=== Athletics ===
Willowbrook competes in the West Suburban Conference. The school is also a member of the Illinois High School Association (IHSA), which governs most interscholastic sports and competitive activities. Teams from the school are stylized as the "Warriors" (in the tradition of a Roman soldier).

The school sponsors interscholastic athletic teams for young men and women in: basketball, cross country, golf, gymnastics, soccer, swimming and diving, tennis, track & field, and volleyball. Young men may also compete in baseball, football, and wrestling, while young women may compete in badminton, bowling, cheerleading, and softball. While not sponsored by the IHSA, the school also sponsors a poms team, as well as a basketball, volleyball, and track and field team which competes in the Special Olympics.

The following teams have finished in the top four of their respective IHSA sponsored state tournaments or meets:

- Badminton: 4th place (1999–2000, 2005–06); 3rd place (1994–95, 2002–03); 2nd place (1985–86, 1995–96, 1996–97); State Champions (1997–98, 1998–99)
- Baseball: Regional (1962–63, 1972–73, 2011–12, 2016–17, 2017–2018); Sectional (1972–73); State Final Qualifier, Semifinals (1973)
- Basketball (boys): Regional (1962–63, 1969–70, 2003–04, 2017–18)
- Cross Country (boys): 2nd place (1978–79)
- Football: quarterfinals (1990–1991, 2016–17, 2017–18, 2018–19); semifinals (1974–75, 1975–76, 2019–20)
- Gymnastics (boys): 4th place (1959–60, 1964–65, 2014–15); 2nd place (1961–62, 1965–66); State Champions (1963–64)
- Volleyball (girls): 3rd place (2023)

=== Theatre ===
Theatre at Willowbrook High School is one of the largest student organizations at the school, with over 200 students involved across three yearly productions, performing in the historic Doris E. White Auditorium. Students run every facet of the program under the guidance of several tech and acting directors. Opportunities for students include acting, instrumental performance, and the following technical crews: Sound/Projection Crew, Lights Crew, Props Crew, Construction Crew, Paint Crew, Costumes Crew, and Student Leadership. Since entering the Illinois High School Association Drama & Group Interpretation competition in 2014, the Willowbrook High School Theatre contest play has received the following accolades:

- State Championship (2025-26)
- Sectional Champion (2023–24, 2024–25, 2025-26)
- Sectional Runner Up (2013–14, 2015–16, 2016–17, 2017–18, 2020–21, 2021–22, 2022–23)
- 2nd Place State Drama Production (2021–22, 2023–24)
- 3rd Place State Drama Production (2013–2014, 2016–17)
- 5th Place State Drama Production (2017–18, 2020–21, 2022–23)
- 6th Place State Drama Production (2015–16)
- 8th Place State Drama Production (2024–25)
- All-State 1st Place Technical Performance large size set (2025-26)
- All-State 1st Place Technical Performance Midsize set (2021–22)
- All-State 2nd Place Drama Technical Performance (2023–24)
- All-State Technical Award (2017–18)
- Sportsmanship Award (2022-23)

=== Music ===
The Willowbrook High School music department hosts several levels of auditioned curricular ensembles: three choral ensembles, three concert bands, and two string orchestras; as well as an extracurricular show choir, dubbed "Center Stage", rock band, marching band, and two levels of auditioned jazz ensembles. Accolades include:

Jazz I:

- Illinois State University Jazz Festival: Division III 2nd place (2017), Division III Champions (2018, 2019)
- Chicago Area Jazz Festival: "Outstanding Jazz Performance" (2019)

Jazz II:

- Illinois State University Jazz Festival: Division II 3nd place (2017), Division II 2nd place (2018), Division II Champions (2019)
- Chicago Area Jazz Festival: "Outstanding Jazz Performance" (2019)

Wind Ensemble:

- Midwest Music Festival: 3rd place (2019), Esprit de Corps Award (2019)

Under the direction of Mrs. Karyn Wolcott, the Willowbrook High School Concert Choir has earned the following honors:

- Featured IMEC Choral Division Choir (2010, 2018)

=== Math Team ===
Willowbrook used to compete in the North Suburban Math League (NSML), however since the founding of the West Suburban Math League (WSML), it has opted to compete only in the WSML, the West Suburban Gold math league, and the Illinois Council of Teachers of Mathematics (ICTM) math league. The team has four coaches and is open to grades 9–12, utilizing both group teams as well as individual competitors. In recent years, the team has earned a plethora of individual awards as well as the following group titles:

- WSG Conference: Champions (2017)
- ICTM Regionals: 2nd place (2016, 2018, 2019), Champions (2017)
- WSML Conference Orals: Champions (2019)

=== The Rock ===
The Rock is a tradition in Willowbrook High School. It was dug up when the new Doris E. White auditorium was built in the 1960s. It was then positioned outside the main athletic doors of the high school. Students usually paint it at night with various slogans or colors to celebrate accomplishments or mark special occasions.

== Notable alumni ==
- Hawk Wolinski (class of 1966) American keyboardist, songwriter and record producer.
- Tino Insana (class of 1966) was an American actor, producer, writer, voice artist, and comedian.
- Steve Beshekas (class of 1966) member of the comedy group the West Compass Players along with Tino Insana and John Belushi. Beshekas ran the Sneak Joint in Old Town during the filming of The Blues Brothers. He later opened another Old Town establishment, U.S. Blues Bar.
- Tom Hicks was an NFL linebacker (1976–1980), playing his entire career for the Chicago Bears.
- Mike Rowland, major league baseball pitcher, San Francisco Giants, 1980–1981
- Dan Schatzeder (class of 1972), major league baseball pitcher, and World Series game winner with the Minnesota Twins.
- Robert Falls (class of 1972) is the Artistic Director for the Goodman Theatre in Chicago (1986–present). He won the 1999 Tony Award for Best Direction of a Play, for his direction of Death of a Salesman.
- Drew Peterson (class of 1972) is a former Bolingbrook police sergeant and notable murderer.
- Bruce Hajek (class of 1973), head of the Department of Electrical & Computer Engineering and Leonard C. and Mary Lou Hoeft Chair in Engineering at the University of Illinois Urbana-Champaign
- Rick Santelli, (Class of 1974) is an on-air editor/reporter for the CNBC Business News network. He joined CNBC as an on-air editor on June 14, 1999, reporting primarily from the floor of the Chicago Board of Trade. He was formerly the vice president for an institutional trading and hedge fund account for futures-related products. He is credited with being a catalyst of the Tea Party movement via a statement he made on February 19, 2009.
- Patrick Baldwin Jr. (class of 1981) Director of Crime Analysis for the Las Vegas Metropolitan Police Department Analytical Section-ANSEC
- Jill Pizzotti (class of 1984) Head women's basketball coach at DePaul University since 2025. She would serve as assistant then associate head coach under Doug Bruno from 2011 to 2024. Willowbrook inaugural Athletic Hall of Fame, 2010.
- Mike Sheldon (class of 1991) was an NFL offensive lineman (1997–1999) for the Miami Dolphins.
- Jody Gerut is a former Major League Baseball outfielder (2003–2010) who played for the Milwaukee Brewers.
- Daniel Castady (class of 1997) is the former drummer for the rock band Showoff and vocalist for The Fold.
- Tom Higgenson (class of 1997) is the lead singer of the Grammy-nominated band, Plain White T's.
- Dave Hyde (class of 1994) is the former bassist for the rock band Showoff
- Graham Jordan (class of 1997) is the former guitarist for the rock band Showoff
- Dave Tirio (class of 1997) is the guitarist for the Grammy-nominated band, Plain White T's.
- Athena Aktipis (class of 1998), professor of psychology at the Arizona State University and previous cofounder and codirector of the Center for Evolution and Cancer at the University of California, San Francisco
- Steve Mast (class of 2000) is the former guitarist of the Plain White T's
- Matt Roth (class of 2001) is an NFL defensive end (2005–2011), having played for the Miami Dolphins after college until 2009 when he was traded to the Cleveland Browns. Before the 2011–2012 season, he was traded to the Jacksonville Jaguars
- Chris Roycroft (class of 2015) is an MLB pitcher (2024–present), currently on the St. Louis Cardinals.
- Enrique Cruz Jr. (class of 2021) is an NFL offensive tackle (2026–present), currently on the San Francisco 49ers
