= Matt Roth (American football) =

American football player (born 1982)

No. 98, 53, 90
- Position: Defensive end

Personal information
- Born: October 14, 1982 (age 44); Villa Park, Illinois, U.S.
- Listed height: 6 ft 4 in (1.93 m)
- Listed weight: 275 lb (125 kg)

Career information
- High school: Willowbrook (Villa Park)
- College: Iowa
- NFL draft: 2005: 2nd round, 46th overall pick

Career history
- Miami Dolphins (2005–2009); Cleveland Browns (2009–2010); Jacksonville Jaguars (2011)

Awards and highlights
- Second-team All-American (2004); 2× First-team All-Big Ten (2003–2004)

Career NFL statistics
- Total tackles: 295
- Sacks: 23.5
- Forced fumbles: 6
- Fumble recoveries: 4
- Stats at Pro Football Reference

Matthew M. Roth (born October 14, 1982) is an American former professional football player who was a defensive end in the National Football League (NFL). He played college football for the Iowa Hawkeyes and was selected by the Miami Dolphins in the second round of the 2005 NFL draft. He also played in the NFL for the Cleveland Browns and Jacksonville Jaguars.

== Early life ==
Roth attended Willowbrook High School in Villa Park, Illinois. He was a consensus All-America pick as a senior when he played linebacker and fullback.

Roth lettered three times in wrestling (took his junior off to focus on football), where he won a state title as a senior with a record of 31–0.

== College career ==
Roth was a two-time first-team All-Big Ten selection and an All-American selection as a senior at the University of Iowa.

Roth began his Iowa career as a middle linebacker. He shifted to the defensive line in 2002.

== Professional career ==
Pre-draft measurables
Height	Weight	40-yard dash	10-yard split	20-yard split	20-yard shuttle	Three-cone drill	Vertical jump	Broad jump	Bench press
6 ft 3 3/4 in (1.92 m)	278 lb (126 kg)	4.81 s	1.68 s	2.79 s	4.36 s	7.65 s	32 in (0.81 m)	9 ft 4 in (2.84 m)	26 reps
All values from NFL Combine.

=== Miami Dolphins ===
Roth was selected by the Miami Dolphins in the second round (46th overall) of the 2005 NFL draft, using the pick acquired in the Patrick Surtain trade.

Roth played in a reserve role in all 32 games in his first two seasons.

With the departure of Kevin Carter to the Tampa Bay Buccaneers and David Bowens to free agency, Roth was named starting defensive end in 2007.

In 2008, Roth moved to outside linebacker after the Dolphins shifted to the 3-4 defense. He started 14 of 16 games.

Roth was the subject of controversy at the beginning of training camp in 2009. According to head coach Tony Sparano, Roth failed the team's initial conditioning test due to an unknown illness. Roth's agent, Drew Rosenhaus, stated in a television appearance the failed test was due to a groin injury. On September 5, Roth was placed on the Reserve/Non-Football-Injury list. He was later waived on November 24 of that year.

=== Cleveland Browns ===
Roth was claimed off waivers by the Cleveland Browns on November 25, 2009.

=== Jacksonville Jaguars ===
On August 11, 2011, Roth signed with the Jacksonville Jaguars.

=== NFL statistics ===
Year	Team	GP	COMB	TOTAL	AST	SACK	FF	FR	FR YDS	INT	IR YDS	AVG IR	LNG	TD	PD
2005	MIA	16	20	15	5	1.0	0	1	0	0	0	0	0	0	0
2006	MIA	16	37	24	13	3.5	3	0	0	0	0	0	0	0	0
2007	MIA	13	44	35	9	3.0	1	0	0	0	0	0	0	0	1
2008	MIA	16	53	46	7	5.0	2	0	0	0	0	0	0	0	4
2009	MIA	4	4	2	2	0.0	0	0	0	0	0	0	0	0	0
2009	CLE	6	28	18	10	4.0	0	1	7	0	0	0	0	0	1
2010	CLE	16	86	59	27	3.5	0	0	0	0	0	0	0	0	2
2011	JAX	9	24	18	6	3.5	0	1	5	0	0	0	0	0	0
Career		96	296	217	79	23.5	6	3	0	0	0	0	0	0	8
