= Angelo Saviano =

American politician

Angelo "Skip" Saviano

14th Village President of Elmwood Park
- Incumbent
- Assumed office May 2013
- Preceded by: Pete Silvestri

Member of the Illinois House of Representatives from the 77th district
- In office January 1993 – January 2013
- Preceded by: Frank Giglio
- Succeeded by: Kathleen Willis

Personal details
- Party: Republican
- Other political affiliations: People's Choice Party
- Education: DePaul University
- Profession: Politician

Angelo "Skip" Saviano is a Republican former member of the Illinois House of Representatives, representing the 77th district from 1993 to 2012. He served on seven committees: Registration and Regulation; Committee of the Whole; Aging; Appropriations-Public Safety; Executive; Public Utilities; and Ex-Offender and Reentry Subcommittee. He is currently the Village President of Elmwood Park, a large municipality in northwest Cook County.

During the 2008 Republican Party presidential primaries, Saviano served on the Illinois leadership team of the presidential campaign of former New York City Mayor Rudy Giuliani. In 2015, Saviano signed an amicus brief to the United States Supreme Court in favor of same-sex marriage. In the 2016 Republican Party presidential primaries, Saviano was a delegate pledged to the presidential campaign of Jeb Bush.

== See also ==
- 1990 Cook County Board of Commissioners election
