= Adam Amin =

American sportscaster

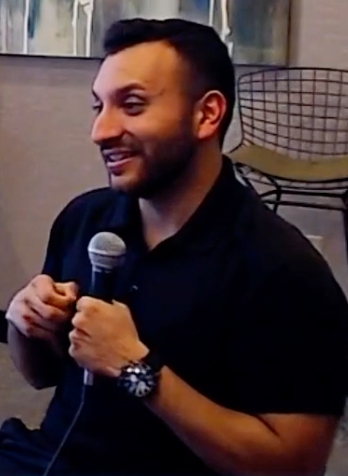
- Amin in 2019
- Education: Valparaiso University
- Sports commentary career
- Genre: Play-by-play
- Sports: American football Baseball; Basketball
- Employer: WCTC (2010–11); ESPN (2011–2020); Fox Sports (2020–present); NBC Sports Chicago (2020–24); Chicago Sports Network (2024–present)

Adam Amin is an American sportscaster. Amin joined Fox Sports in June 2020 as a play-by-play announcer for MLB, NFL and College basketball games after previously working for ESPN from 2011 to 2020. He is also the television play-by-play announcer for the Chicago Bulls of the NBA.

== Early life ==
Amin's father, Mohammed, immigrated to the United States from Karachi, Pakistan, in 1978. He settled in Chicago and worked in a factory. His wife, Zubeda, and three sons, Ismail, Abdullah, and Mustafa, remained in Pakistan, until Mohammed made enough money to send for them in 1985. Adam grew up in suburban Chicago. Amin graduated from Addison Trail High School in suburban Addison, Illinois in 2005. He graduated from Valparaiso University in 2009.

== Career ==
=== WCTC ===
While at Valparaiso University, Amin began broadcasting on WVUR-FM, the student-run college radio station, and called Minor League Baseball games for the Gary SouthShore RailCats and Joliet JackHammers.

Between 2007 and 2011, Amin worked as a sportscaster for the Turner Sports & Entertainment Digital Network, Fox Sports Wisconsin, the Horizon League Network, the Illinois High School Association, and served as sports director of KUOO in Spirit Lake, Iowa. In 2010 and 2011, he called games for the Somerset Patriots of the Atlantic League of Professional Baseball on WCTC.

=== ESPN ===
ESPN hired Amin in 2011 to call college football and college basketball. He has also called professional football, basketball, and baseball as well as collegiate softball, tennis, volleyball, baseball and amateur wrestling.

In 2012, Amin expanded his football broadcasts by signing a contract with Sports USA Radio Network to call NFL and college games. He remained with them until he signed his new ESPN contract, when he was named the new lead announcer for the NFL on ESPN Radio.

He signed a new contract with ESPN in 2017. In 2018, he called the Final Four of the 2018 NCAA Division I women's basketball tournament, the Nathan's Hot Dog Eating Contest, preseason games for the Chicago Bears of the National Football League, and began fill-in work for the Chicago Bulls.

=== Fox Sports and NBC Sports Chicago/CHSN ===
Amin left ESPN for Fox Sports in May 2020. He made his Fox debut on July 25, calling the Brewers-Cubs game, alongside Eric Karros.

It was announced on June 1, 2020, that Amin would become the television play-by-play broadcaster for the Bulls on NBC Sports Chicago, starting with the 2020–2021 season. Amin retained the role until the channel's closure on September 30, 2024, and then transitioned to Chicago Sports Network with the team.

On August 31, 2020, Fox announced that Amin would be a play-by-play broadcaster for the 2020 NFL season, partnering with former Pro Bowler and Super Bowl champion Mark Schlereth and Lindsay Czarniak. This would be the first time that Amin would call regular season NFL games on television. Amin's first game was at Mercedes-Benz Stadium when the Seattle Seahawks defeated the Atlanta Falcons 38–25. Drew Brees became Amin's NFL broadcast partner on Fox during the 2025 season.

Amin made his Fox MLB playoff debut in October 2020, calling the National League Division Series between the Atlanta Braves and Miami Marlins, alongside A.J. Pierzynski and Adam Wainwright. The National Sports Media Association named Amin the Illinois Sportscaster of the Year for 2021.

Amin began announcing Team USA Basketball showcase games for the 2023 FIBA World Cup, alongside Bill Raftery. He also announced some 2024 Olympic exhibitions, including the USA's one point victory over South Sudan.

== Personal life ==
Amin is Muslim.
