= Salt Creek Trail =

Shared-use path in Chicago, Illinois, US

- Length: 25 miles (40 km)
- Location: Chicago, Illinois US
- Trailheads: Brookfield, Illinois, Elk Grove Village, Villa Park, Illinois
- Use: Cycling, skateboarding, personal transporter, and pedestrians
- Difficulty: Easy
- Season: Limited access during winter

The Salt Creek Trail is a set of public trails across multiple suburbs surrounding Chicago, Illinois in the US.

== Background ==
Frequent intersections do pose a threat to path users. These intersections are clearly signed both to path users and motorists. It also serves as a route for bicycle, skateboard and personal transporter commuters. The trail mostly follows the Salt Creek River, a tributary of the Des Plaines River.

== History ==
As of 2023, Villa Park is working on a Tri-Trail connector project which will connect the trail with both the Illinois Prairie Path and Great Western Trail. The project was completed in 2024.

== See also ==
- Cycling in Chicago
