= Addison Trail High School =

High School in Addison, Illinois

Location
- 213 N. Lombard Road; Addison, Illinois 60101; United States; 41.9311°N 88.0209°W

Information
- School type: Public secondary
- Opened: 1966; 60 years ago
- School district: DuPage HSD 88
- Superintendent: Jean Barbanente
- Principal: Jack Andrews
- Staff: 118.59 (FTE)
- Grades: 9—12
- Gender: Co-educational
- Enrollment: 1,904 (2023–2024)
- Average class size: 16.6
- Student to teacher ratio: 16.06
- Campus: Suburban
- Colors: Navy blue White
- Slogan: Academically Engaged, Trustworthy, Honorable, and Safe
- Fight song: "A.T. Blazers Go!"
- Athletics conference: West Suburban Conference
- Mascot: Bucky the Blazer
- Nickname: Blazers
- Newspaper: Torch
- Yearbook: In Retrospect
- Website: www.dupage88.net/index.php?website_id=2

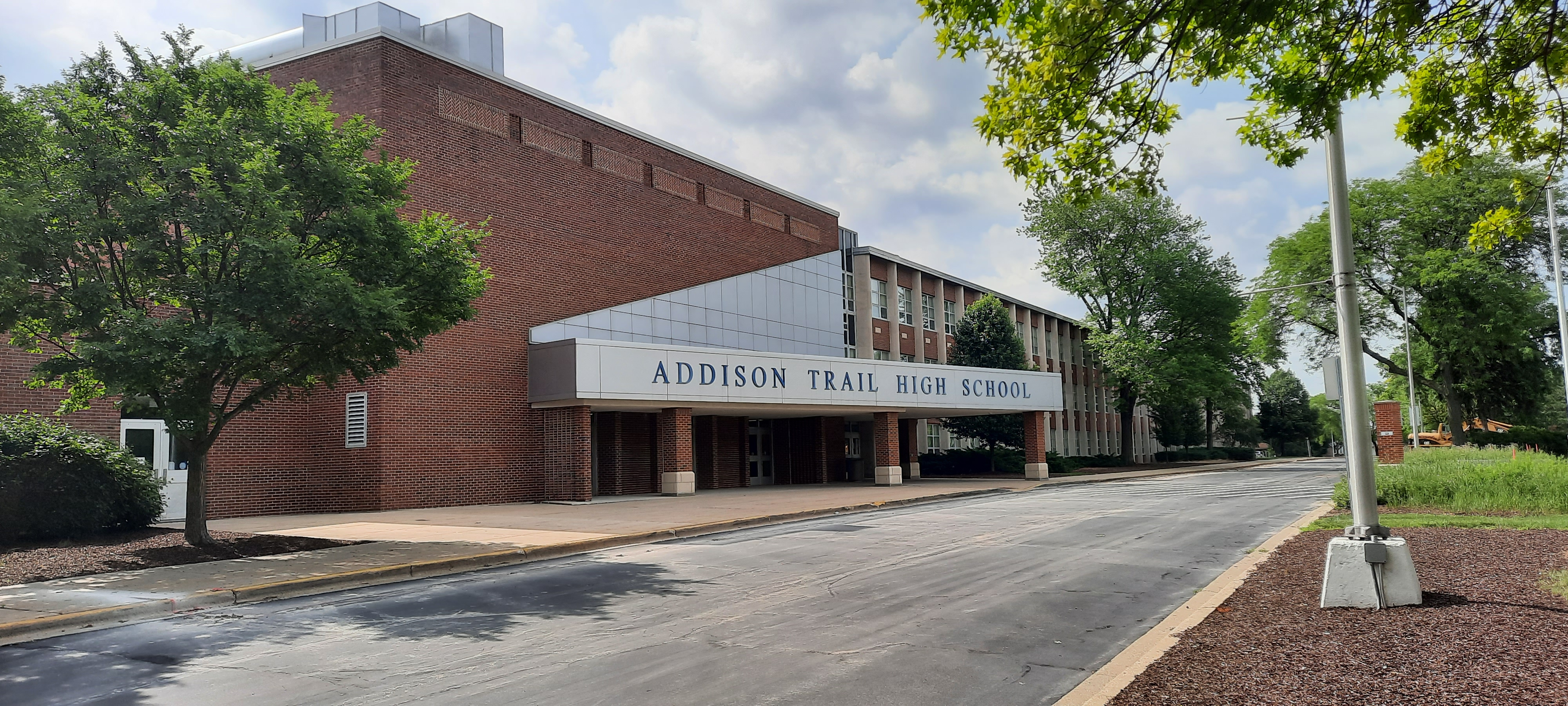
Front entrance of Addison Trail High School

Addison Trail High School (ATHS) is a public four-year high school in Addison, a western suburb of Chicago, Illinois, in DuPage County, United States. It is located approximately half a mile east of Interstate 355 at the intersection of Army Trail Road and Lombard Road in and is part of DuPage High School District 88, which also includes Willowbrook High School. Addison Trail draws its students from Addison and unincorporated areas adjacent to Lombard and Wood Dale.

Addison Trail has roughly 1,900 students in grades 9-12, and 120 (on an FTE basis) teachers. Addison Trail is ranked as the 344th best high school in Illinois.

The population at Addison Trail is 70.0% Hispanic, 22.3% White, 3.8% Asian, 2.0% Black, 0.9% American Indian, Native Alaskan, Native Hawaiian, or Pacific Islander, and 1.0% two or more races.

== History ==
Addison Trail High School opened on September 1, 1966. Before the opening of Addison Trail, there were two other high schools within District 88 – York High School in Elmhurst and Willowbrook High School in Villa Park. Due to the rapid growth within District 88, Addison Trail was approved for construction, making it the third in the district.

Since the opening of Addison Trail, there have been significant changes to the school. In 1976, construction of a new addition was approved because of a growing student population. In 2008, construction began on new renovations, which included a new 3-story classroom addition, student commons area and field house. The renovations and additions were completed in 2010. In 2010, Village of Addison purchased what was once Driscoll High School with the primary intention of using it as Addison Trail's athletic fields. The acquired land was named Blazer Park. The school has 120 classrooms and its still going on. The basement has an auto tech classroom, including a woodshop, a photography classroom plus driver eds room, a credit recovery room and an BRC (behavioral resource center) and a fitness gym. Plus there is a couple of classrooms used for sports and education classes.

== Academics ==
In 2024, Addison Trail had a four-year graduation rate of 88%. Its five-year graduation rate was 90.2%, slightly higher than the State average of 89.3%. Addison Trail is ranked #10,736 in the national rankings, based on student performance on state-required tests, graduation, and how well students are prepared to enter college.

== Sports ==
Addison Trail competes in the West Suburban Conference. The school is a member of the Illinois High School Association (IHSA) which governs most sports and competitive activities in the state. Addison Trail's teams are stylized as the Blazers.

The school sponsors interscholastic teams for boys and girls in basketball, cross country, golf, gymnastics, soccer, swimming and diving, tennis, track & field and volleyball. Boys may also compete in baseball, American football and wrestling, while girls may compete in badminton, bowling, cheerleading and softball.

The following teams finished in the top four of their respective IHSA sponsored state championship tournament or meet.

- Gymnastics (boys): State Champions (1976–77, 1977–78, 1979–80, 1980–81, 1981–82, 1984–85, 1985–86)
- Gymnastics (girls): State Champions (1977–78, 1978–79, 1979–80, 1980–81, 1990–91)
- Wrestling: State Champions (1978–79, 1979–80)
- Hockey State Champions (1993)
- Co-ed cheerleading: ICCA Champions (2016)
- Co-ed cheerleading stunt group: 1st place (2016)

== Notable alumni ==
- Adam Amin (class of 2005) sportscaster
- Mark Anelli (class of 1997) was an NFL tight end (2002), playing for the San Francisco 49ers
- Kyle Kinane (class of 1995), stand-up comedian
- Alexa Scimeca Knierim (class of 2009), figure skater, pairs world champion in 2022 World Figure Skating Championships
- James Millns (class of 1967), with partner Colleen O'Connor, won three U.S. National Championships in ice dancing; pair became first Americans to win medals in that event at Olympics, winning bronze at 1976 Winter Olympics
- Mark Rodenhauser, was an NFL center (1987–1999)
- Rocco Sisto (class of 1970) actor, played Richie Gazzo in Donnie Brasco and young Junior Soprano in The Sopranos
- Lenae Williams (class of 1998), basketball player in WNBA (2002) with Detroit Shock
