= Adventureland (Illinois) =

Defunct amusement park in Addison, Illinois

- Interactive map of Adventureland
- Location: Addison, Illinois
- Coordinates: 41°57′21.5″N 88°3′6″W
- Status: Defunct
- Opened: 1961
- Closed: 1977

Attractions
- Roller coasters: 3

Adventureland was an amusement park located in Addison, Illinois, which operated from 1961 to 1977. The land where the park was located was originally a restaurant and tavern known as Paul's Picnic Grove, and from 1958 to 1961 was the site of a family attraction known as Storybook Park.

From 1967 to 1976, it was the largest amusement park in Illinois. Attractions at the park included Dizzy Hofbrauhaus, a Scrambler, Crash 'n Splash Torpedo Tubs, Western Round-Up, bumper cars, the Italian Bobs roller coaster, and the Super Italian Bobs roller coaster.

== History ==
The former Storybook Park was sold to Durell Everding (whose family also owned Santa's Village Amusement & Water Park) in 1961 and renamed Adventureland. Some attractions from Storybook Park were kept, but the new owner began to install more thrilling rides to the park to attract older visitors as well. Everding died in 1970, and the park was run by his family until it was later purchased by Medinah Investors. The park closed in 1977 as the result of being out-competed by Six Flags Great America. Its rides and attractions were auctioned off after the park's closure.

Since the park's closing, Medinah Road on the site's east side was re-routed through part of the property. The Scottish Rite Valley of Chicago building now occupies most of the site.
