= Rocco Sisto =

Italian-American actor (born 1953)

- Born: February 18, 1953 (age 73); Bari, Italy
- Education: Addison Trail High School
- Alma mater: New York University (MFA)
- Occupation: Actor
- Years active: 1981–present
- Spouse: Barbara Allen (m. 1984)

Rocco Sisto (born February 18, 1953) is an Italian-American stage, film, television and voice actor.

== Early life ==
Sisto was born on February 18, 1953, in Bari, and later moved to Addison, Illinois. He attended and graduated Addison Trail High School in 1970 and studied acting at New York University's Graduate Acting Program at the Tisch School of the Arts, graduating in 1977.

== Acting career ==
On TV, he played the young Junior Soprano in the HBO series The Sopranos. He has appeared as well in Star Trek: The Next Generation, Law & Order, CSI: Crime Scene Investigation, Blue Bloods, and Madam Secretary.

In film he has been seen in After Hours, Far and Away, Carlito's Way, Donnie Brasco, Illuminata, and The American Astronaut. His voice work includes Grand Theft Auto: San Andreas and The Warriors.

Sisto has acted in the New York Shakespeare Festival at the Delacorte Theater. In 1996, he received a Drama Desk Award nomination for his acting in the play Quills.

== Filmography ==
=== Film ===
Year	Title	Role	Notes
1984	Scream for Help	Lacey Bohle	
1985	After Hours	Coffee Shop Cashier	
1988	Me and Him	Art Strong	
1989	Red Riding Hood	Dagger	
1992	Far and Away	Immigrant #2	
1992	Innocent Blood	Gilly	
1992	Lorenzo's Oil	Murphy Family	
1993	Naked in New York	Comedy Mask	
1993	Carlito's Way	Panama Hatman	
1996	Eraser	Pauley	
1996	Rescuing Desire	S&M Guide	
1997	Love Walked In	Ilm Zamsky	
1997	Donnie Brasco	Richie Gazzo	
1998	Illuminata	Prince	
2000	Blue Moon	Fred	
2000	The Intern	Pierre La Roux	
2000	Frequency	Daryl Adams	
2000	In the Weeds	Maurizio	
2000	Machiavelli Rises	Niccolò Machiavelli	
2001	The American Astronaut	Professor Hess	
2003	Undermind	Dr. Peters / Gunman	
2004	Eulogy	District Attorney	
2005	Survival of the Fittest	Lt. Gabor	Short film
2006	Spectropia	Talking Object	
2008	The Alphabet Killer	Father McQuarrie	
2009	Mother's Day	Priam	Short film
2011	A Bird of the Air	Security Guard	
2012	Possession	Osmond	
2013	Joy de V.	Antoine	
2014	The Sideways Light	The Doctor	
2021	Son	Dr. Bradlee	

=== Television ===
Year	Title	Role	Notes
1986	Doing Life	Anthony Portelli	Television film
1986–87	Spenser: For Hire	Eddie Duffy / Sunny Stroud	2 episodes
1987	The Equalizer	Frank	Episode: "Carnal Persuasion"
1987	Leg Work	Nico	Episode: "The Art of Murder"
1990	Matlock	Manager	Episode: "The D.A."
1990	Star Trek: The Next Generation	Sakkath	Episode: "Sarek"
1992–2002	Law & Order	Joseph Turner / Brendan Hall / Jamie Astangura	3 episodes
1999	Homicide: Life on the Street	Raphael Sykes	Episode: "Bones of Contention"
1999–2007	The Sopranos	Corrado “Junior” Soprano	3 episodes
2001	18 Wheels of Justice		Episode: "Once a Thief"
2001	The Big Heist	Tommy DeSimone	Television film
2002	JAG	Inspector Giannini	Episode: "The Killer"
2003	NYPD Blue	Remy Blanchard	Episode: "Marine Life"
2003	Crossing Jordan	Restaurant Owner	Episode: "Pandora's Trunk: Part 1"
2004	CSI: Crime Scene Investigation	Riley "Boom Boom" Renaldo - Mindy's Landlord	Episode: "Getting Off"
2005	Alias	Ignacio	Episode: "Another Mister Sloane"
2006	Law & Order: Criminal Intent	Police Commissioner Fahey	2 episodes
2007	Close to Home	Wayne Thomas	Episode: "Eminent Domain"
2011	Mildred Pierce	Mr. Rossi	2 episodes of miniseries
2012	666 Park Avenue	Dr. Claude Anton	Episode: "Whatever Happened to Baby Jane?"
2016	Blue Bloods	Gordon Rykert	Episode: "Confessions"
2017	Madam Secretary	Defense Minister Renaldo Bellucci	Episode: "Revelation"
2018	The Blacklist	Spiritual Director	Episode: "The Cook (No. 56)"
2019	Evil	Silvio	Episode: "Vatican III"
2019–21	Law & Order: Special Victims Unit	Judge Ellery	3 episodes

== Video games ==
Year	Title	Role	Notes
2004	Grand Theft Auto: San Andreas	Mafia Gangster	Voice
2005	The Warriors	Stefano	Voice
