= Villa Park, Illinois =

Village in Illinois, United States

Villa Park
- Village
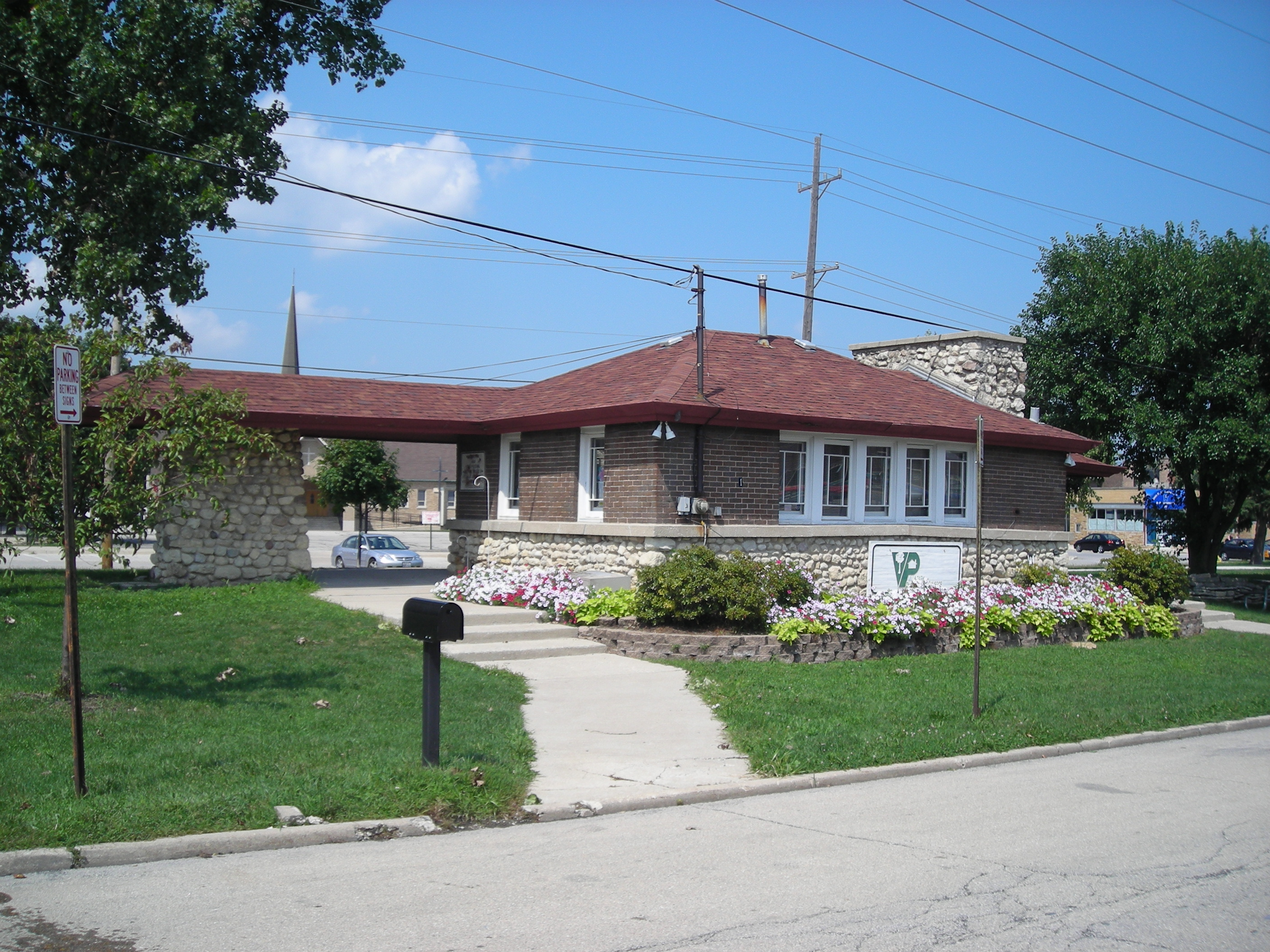
- Ardmore Avenue Station

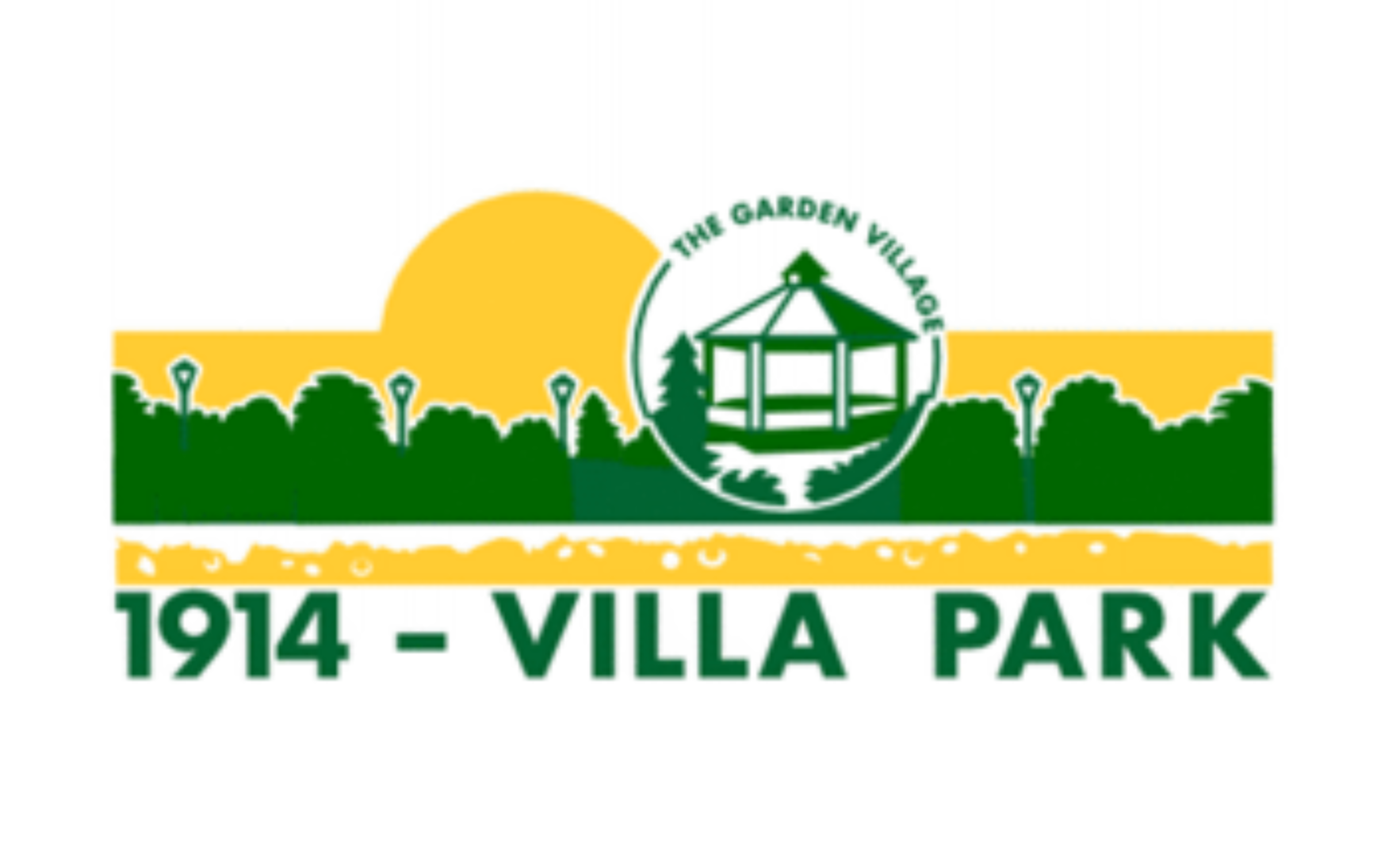
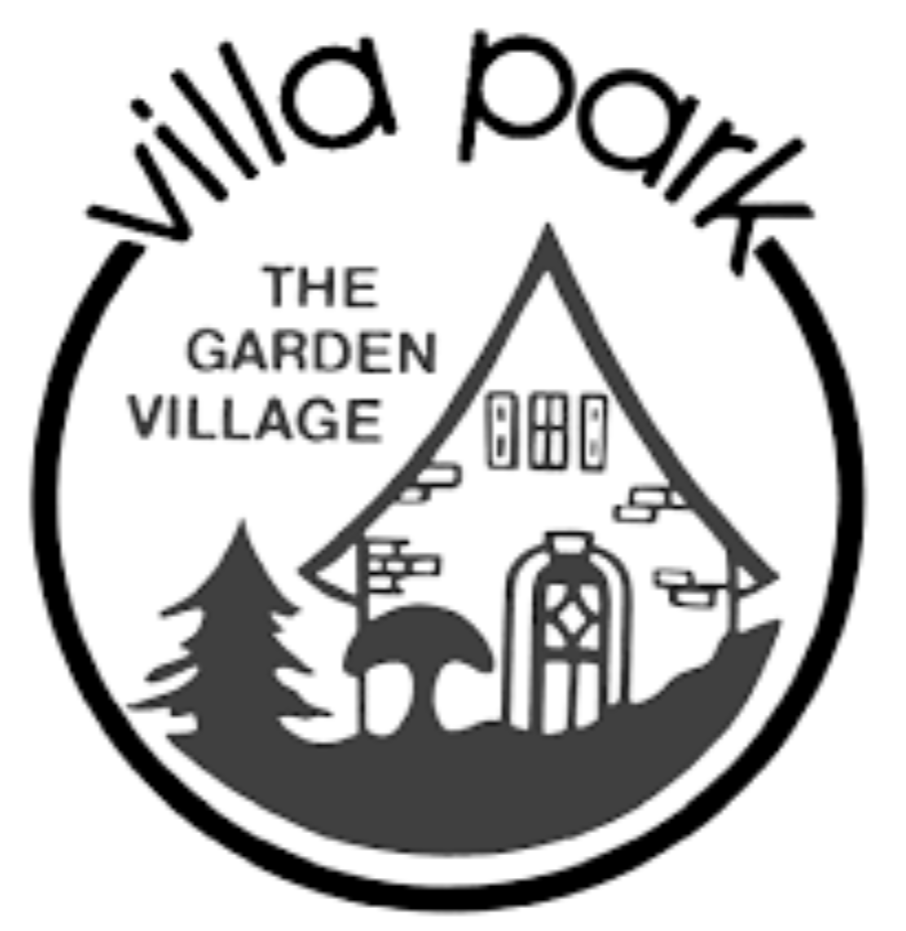
- Flag Seal
- Nickname: "The Garden Village"
- Location of Villa Park in DuPage County, Illinois.
- Coordinates: 41°53′12″N 87°59′20″W
- Country: United States
- State: Illinois
- County: DuPage
- Townships: York, Addison
- Incorporated: 1914

Government
  - Type: Council–manager

Area
  - Total: 4.77 sq mi (12.35 km^{2})
  - Land: 4.72 sq mi (12.23 km^{2})
  - Water: 0.046 sq mi (0.12 km^{2})
- Elevation: 689 ft (210 m)

Population (2020)
  - Total: 22,263
  - Density: 4,715/sq mi (1,820/km^{2})
- Time zone: UTC-6 (CST)
  - Summer (DST): UTC-5 (CDT)
- ZIP codes: 60158, 60181
- North American Numbering Plan: 630, 331
- FIPS code: 17-77993
- GNIS feature ID: 2400070
- Website: www.invillapark.com

Villa Park is a village in DuPage County, Illinois, United States. Situated along the Illinois Prairie Path, Villa Park was originally built as a company town in the early 20th century. The village is located in the area between North Avenue (IL-64) and Roosevelt Road (IL-38), directly west of Kingery Highway (IL-83). It is a western suburb of Chicago. The population as of the 2020 Census was 22,263.

Villa Park is traversed by the Illinois Prairie Path and includes two former Chicago Aurora and Elgin Railroad stations listed on the National Register of Historic Places. The village was the longtime site of the Ovaltine factory, now converted to residences.

== History ==
Following the construction of two residential subdivisions—Villa Park (1908) and Ardmore (1910) by the real estate firm Ballard & Pottinger—the community incorporated as the Village of Ardmore in 1914. The name was changed to Villa Park in 1917.

Villa Park developed as a western suburb of Chicago served by the electric Chicago Aurora and Elgin Railroad (CA&E). The line provided a direct connection between Chicago’s Loop and Wheaton, where it branched toward Aurora and Elgin. Two commercial districts grew around the Villa Avenue and Ardmore Avenue stations. Passenger service on the CA&E ended in 1957 amid declining ridership following completion of the Eisenhower Expressway (I-290). The railroad’s right-of-way was later converted into the Illinois Prairie Path, a regional hiking and biking trail network.

The village was also home to the Ovaltine factory, which operated for much of the twentieth century and was listed on the National Register of Historic Places in 1986. The complex has since been converted into loft apartments.

In 1986, local Muslim residents founded the Islamic Foundation School, reflecting Villa Park’s growing cultural diversity.

The Villa Park Public Library underwent a major renovation and expansion beginning in 2017 and completed in 2019.

== Geography ==
Villa Park is in eastern DuPage County in the western suburbs of Chicago. It is bordered by Elmhurst to the east, Lombard to the west, Addison to the north, and Oakbrook Terrace to the south. The village’s elevation is approximately 689 feet (210 m) above sea level.

According to the United States Census Bureau, Villa Park has a total area of 4.77 square miles (12.35 km^{2}), of which 4.72 square miles (12.22 km^{2}) (99.06%) is land and 0.05 square miles (0.13 km^{2}) (0.94%) is water.

Two regional multi-use trails—the Illinois Prairie Path and the Salt Creek Trail—cross the community along former railroad and greenway corridors (see Parks and recreation).

== Demographics ==
Historical population
Census	Pop.	Note	%±
1920	854		—
1930	6,220		628.3%
1940	7,236		16.3%
1950	8,821		21.9%
1960	20,391		131.2%
1970	25,891		27.0%
1980	23,155		−10.6%
1990	22,253		−3.9%
2000	22,075		−0.8%
2010	21,904		−0.8%
2020	22,263		1.6%
U.S. Decennial Census

=== Racial and ethnic composition ===
Villa Park village, Illinois – Racial and ethnic composition Note: the US Census treats Hispanic/Latino as an ethnic category. This table excludes Latinos from the racial categories and assigns them to a separate category. Hispanics/Latinos may be of any race.
Race / Ethnicity (NH = Non-Hispanic)	Pop 2000	Pop 2010	Pop 2020	% 2000	% 2010	% 2020
White alone (NH)	17,820	15,639	13,950	80.72%	71.40%	62.66%
Black or African American alone (NH)	368	908	995	1.67%	4.15%	4.47%
Native American or Alaska Native alone (NH)	25	26	32	0.11%	0.12%	0.14%
Asian alone (NH)	804	1,129	1,348	3.64%	5.15%	6.05%
Pacific Islander alone (NH)	3	1	3	0.01%	0.00%	0.01%
Other race alone (NH)	17	14	85	0.08%	0.06%	0.38%
Mixed race or Multiracial (NH)	268	293	766	1.21%	1.34%	3.44%
Hispanic or Latino (any race)	2,770	3,894	5,084	12.55%	17.78%	22.84%
Total	22,075	21,904	22,263	100.00%	100.00%	100.00%

=== 2020 census ===
As of the 2020 census, there were 22,263 people, 8,298 households, and 5,575 families in the village. The median age was 38.1 years. 22.4% of residents were under the age of 18 and 14.0% were 65 years of age or older. For every 100 females, there were 102.5 males, and for every 100 females age 18 and over, there were 102.3 males age 18 and over.

100.0% of residents lived in urban areas, while 0.0% lived in rural areas.

Of all households, 31.9% had children under the age of 18 living in them. Among households, 51.5% were married-couple households, 19.3% were households with a male householder and no spouse or partner present, and 21.9% were households with a female householder and no spouse or partner present. About 24.7% of all households were made up of individuals and 9.2% had someone living alone who was 65 years of age or older. The average household size was 2.76 and the average family size was 3.34.

There were 8,627 housing units, of which 3.8% were vacant. The homeowner vacancy rate was 0.8% and the rental vacancy rate was 5.4%. The population density was 4,669.25 inhabitants per square mile (1,802.81/km^{2}) and the housing unit density was 1,809.35 per square mile (698.59/km^{2}).

=== Income and poverty ===
The median income for a household in the village was $79,314, and the median income for a family was $91,250. Males had a median income of $47,722 versus $35,269 for females. The per capita income for the village was $34,529. About 3.9% of families and 6.6% of the population were below the poverty line, including 7.2% of those under age 18 and 7.0% of those age 65 or over.

== Economy ==
According to the Village of Villa Park’s 2023 Annual Comprehensive Financial Report, the community’s economy is primarily based on retail, light manufacturing, construction, and professional services. The village benefits from its central DuPage County location and access to major transportation corridors including Interstate 290, I-355, and Illinois Route 83.

As of 2023, the ten largest employers in Villa Park were:

Principal Employers – 2023
Rank	Employer	Employees
1	McMaster-Carr Supply Company	420
2	Inland Paperboard and Packaging	340
3	Clayco Construction	290
4	Commonwealth Edison	260
5	First Student (school transportation)	200
6	Walmart	175
7	Jewel-Osco	160
8	Village of Villa Park	155
9	Villa Park School District 45	150
10	U-Haul Moving & Storage	125

The village reported an unemployment rate of 3.9% in 2023, consistent with DuPage County’s overall rate and below the Illinois state average of 4.6%.

== Government ==
Villa Park operates under the council–manager form. Legislative authority is vested in a Village Board consisting of a Village President and six trustees elected at-large to four-year staggered terms. The Board adopts ordinances and the annual budget, appoints advisory commissions, and hires the Village Manager. The Manager oversees day-to-day administration and appoints department heads. The Village President of Villa Park as of December 2025 is Kevin Patrick. Villa Park lies within Illinois 6th Congressional District, represented by Democrat Sean Casten.

== Education ==
Villa Park is served by several public school districts. Most of the village is within School District 45, DuPage County, which operates elementary and middle schools including Ardmore, North, Schafer, Stevenson, Westmore, Jefferson Middle School, and Jackson Middle School. Portions of the community are also served by Salt Creek School District 48, Lombard School District 44, and Addison School District 4.

High school students attend DuPage High School District 88, primarily Willowbrook High School in Villa Park and, in some southern areas, Addison Trail High School.

Parochial schools include the Islamic Foundation School, established in 1986, and St. Alexander Catholic School. Higher education needs are served by nearby College of DuPage in Glen Ellyn.

== Transportation ==
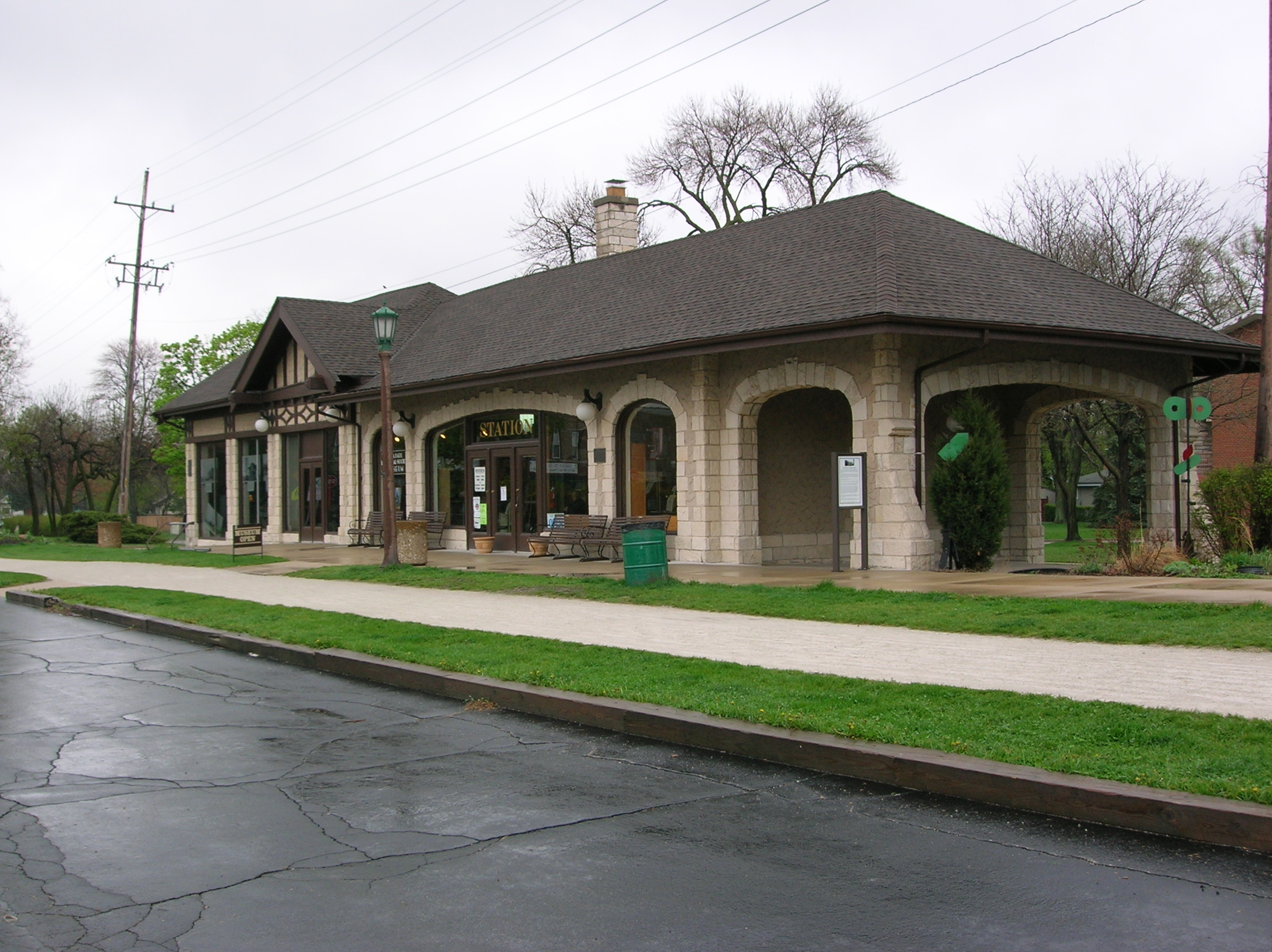
Villa Avenue Train Station

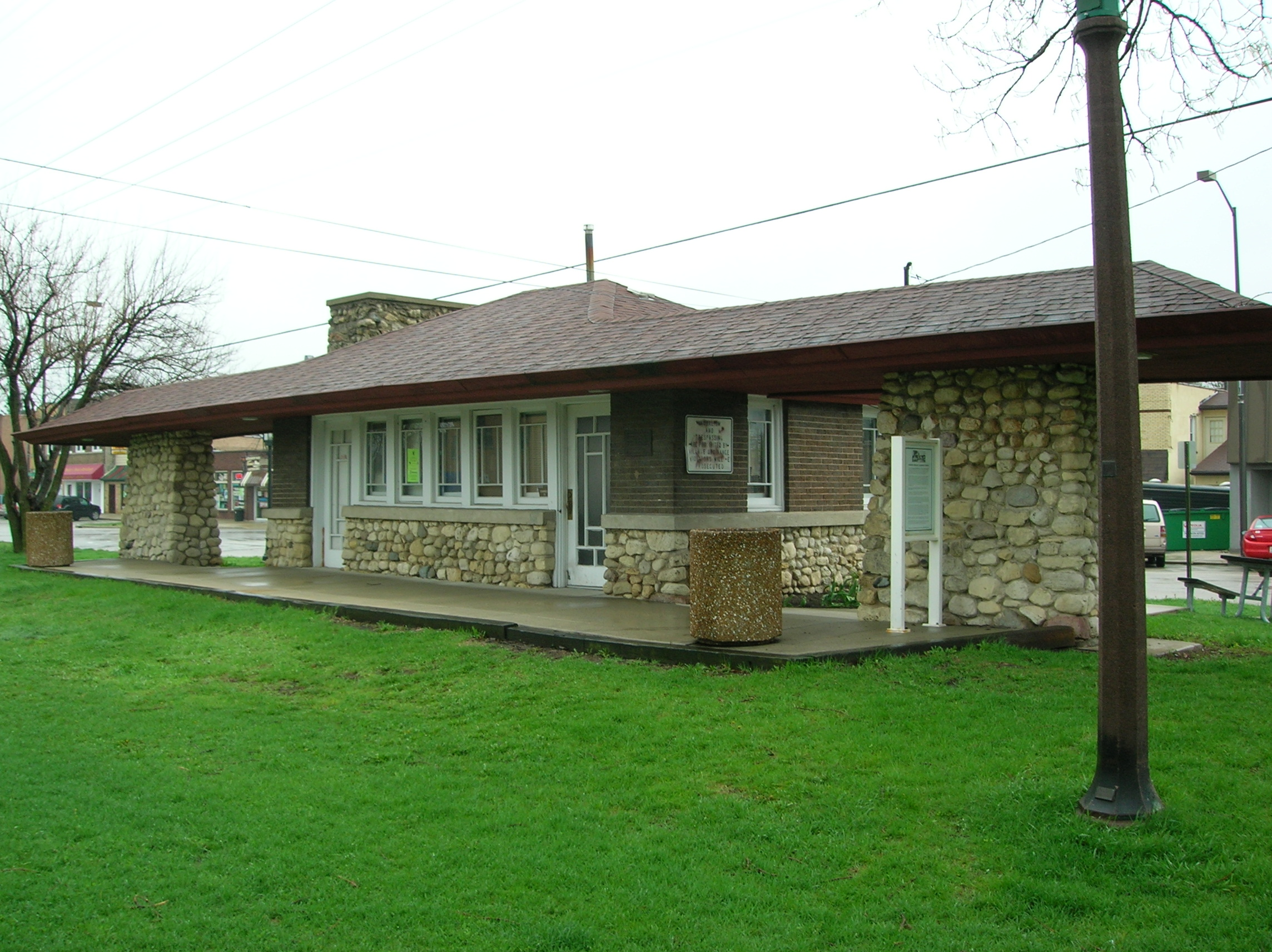
Ardmore Avenue Train Station

Villa Park has a commuter rail station on Metra’s Union Pacific West Line with service west to Elburn, Illinois and east to downtown Chicago. Pace provides bus service on Routes 301 and 313 connecting Villa Park with Forest Park, Wheaton, and surrounding communities. Villa Park is accessible by major roads including Illinois Route 83, North Avenue (IL-64), and Illinois Route 38, with nearby connections to I-290 and I-355.

The former CA&E Ardmore Avenue and Villa Avenue stations are both listed on the National Register of Historic Places.

== Parks and recreation ==
The Village of Villa Park Parks and Recreation Department manages 18 parks and recreational facilities, including the Iowa Community Center, Jefferson Pool, and the Community Recreation Building. The department provides year-round programs in athletics, fitness, and community events.

Villa Park is intersected by two major regional trails maintained by the Forest Preserve District of DuPage County: the Illinois Prairie Path, following the former Chicago Aurora and Elgin Railroad right-of-way, and the Salt Creek Trail, which links to the larger DuPage County greenway network. The Great Western Trail also passes through the northern part of the village.

== Notable people ==
- Nicole Abusharif, criminal convicted of the murder of her domestic partner Rebecca Klein in Villa Park
- Norma Berger, pitcher in the All-American Girls Professional Baseball League; lived in Villa Park
- Tom Cullerton, member of the Illinois Senate (2013–2021); resides in Villa Park
- Tino Insana, actor, voice actor, writer, producer; graduated Willowbrook High School, 1966
- John Kennedy, driver with NASCAR; born in Villa Park
- Anita Padilla, reporter for WFLD-TV in Chicago
- Matt Roth, former NFL player
- Bobby Wawak, driver with NASCAR; born in Villa Park
