= Norma Hernandez =

American politician

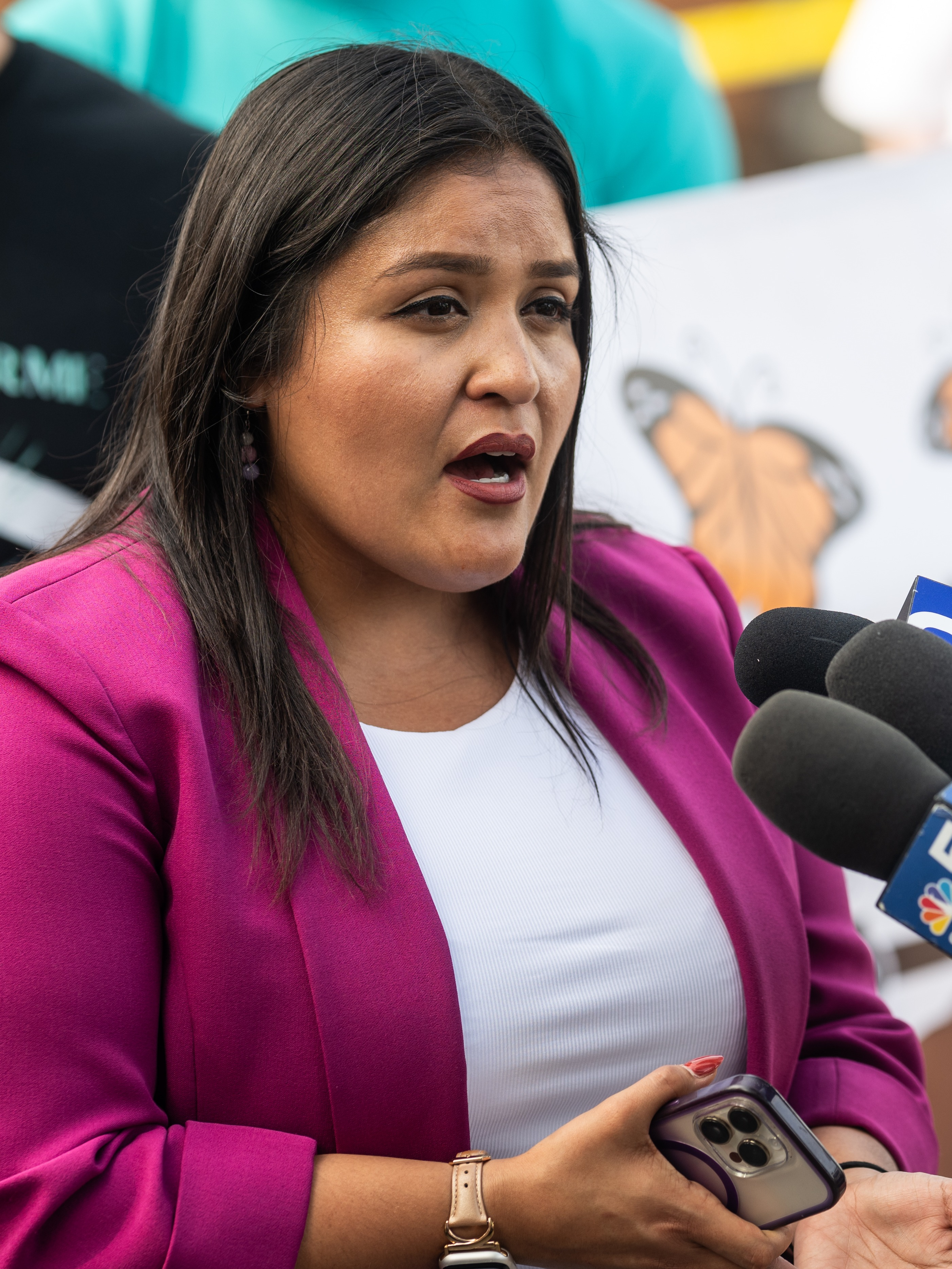

Member of the Illinois House of Representatives from the 77th district
- Incumbent
- Assumed office January 11, 2023
- Preceded by: Kathleen Willis

Personal details
- Born: 1990 or 1991 (age 35–36) Melrose Park, Illinois, U.S.
- Party: Democratic
- Education: Triton College (AA); Aurora University (BA); University of Illinois, Chicago (MUP)

Norma Hernandez (born 1990/1991) is an American politician serving as a member of the Illinois House of Representatives for the 77th district. Elected in November 2022, she assumed office on January 11, 2023. Hernandez is a member of the Democratic Party.

== Early life and education ==
Hernandez was born and raised in Melrose Park, Illinois. Her grandfather had immigrated to the area from Jalisco in the 1960s as part of the Bracero Program. Both of her parents worked manufacturing jobs, and her father was a union member for almost 30 years. Hernandez is a Catholic.

Hernandez graduated from Proviso East High School in Maywood before obtaining an Associate of Arts degree from Triton College in 2013. She went on to earn her Bachelor of Arts in social work from Aurora University in 2016 and her Master of Arts in urban planning and policy from the University of Illinois Chicago (UIC) in 2019.

== Early career ==
Hernandez began working at the age of 14 by cleaning offices. She went on to work full-time at Walgreens for 12 years to pay for her education. From 2017 to 2018, Hernandez was a child welfare specialist at Youth Outreach Services. From 2018 to 2022, she was an urban planner at the UIC Great Cities Institute. Hernandez was also elected to a two-year term on the Triton College Board of Trustees in 2021, becoming the first Latina to ever serve in the role.

== Political career ==
In January 2022, Hernandez announced her candidacy in the 2022 election to represent the 77th district in the Illinois House of Representatives, challenging five-term incumbent Kathleen Willis. She said she hoped to represent the changing demographics of the district, and that she was motivated to run due to the lack of resources available to the community during the COVID-19 pandemic. Hernandez was endorsed by Congressman Chuy García of Illinois's 4th district, as well as progressive organizations and labor unions such as the AFSCME Council 31, Equality Illinois, United Working Families, the Mid-America Carpenters Union and the Chicago Laborers' District Council. She fundraised $316,000, including $120,000 from unions, compared to Willis' $330,000 in fundraising.

Hernandez upset Willis in the Democratic primary in June after running what the Herald & Review described as "a Chuy-style campaign – lots of family and friends networking, non-stop door-knocking and making sure progressive Latinos got to the polls." She went on to defeat Republican candidate Anthony Airdo in the general election that November after winning 57.5 percent of the vote. Hernandez became the first Latina to represent the district.

=== Committee assignments ===
- Adoption & Child Welfare
- Agriculture & Conservation
- Appropriations - Health & Human Services
- Counties & Townships
- Energy & Environment
- Higher Education
  - Special Topics
- Transportation: Regulations, Roads & Bridges

== Electoral history ==
=== 2022 ===
2022 Illinois's 77th House district election
Primary election
Party	Candidate	Votes	%
Democratic	Norma Hernandez	2,484	51.83
Democratic	Kathleen Willis (incumbent)	2,309	48.17
Total votes		4,793	100.0
General election
Democratic	Norma Hernandez	10,588	57.51
Republican	Anthony Airdo	7,822	42.49
Total votes		18,410	100
Democratic hold			
