= Illinois Prairie Path =

Bicycle trail network in Illinois, US

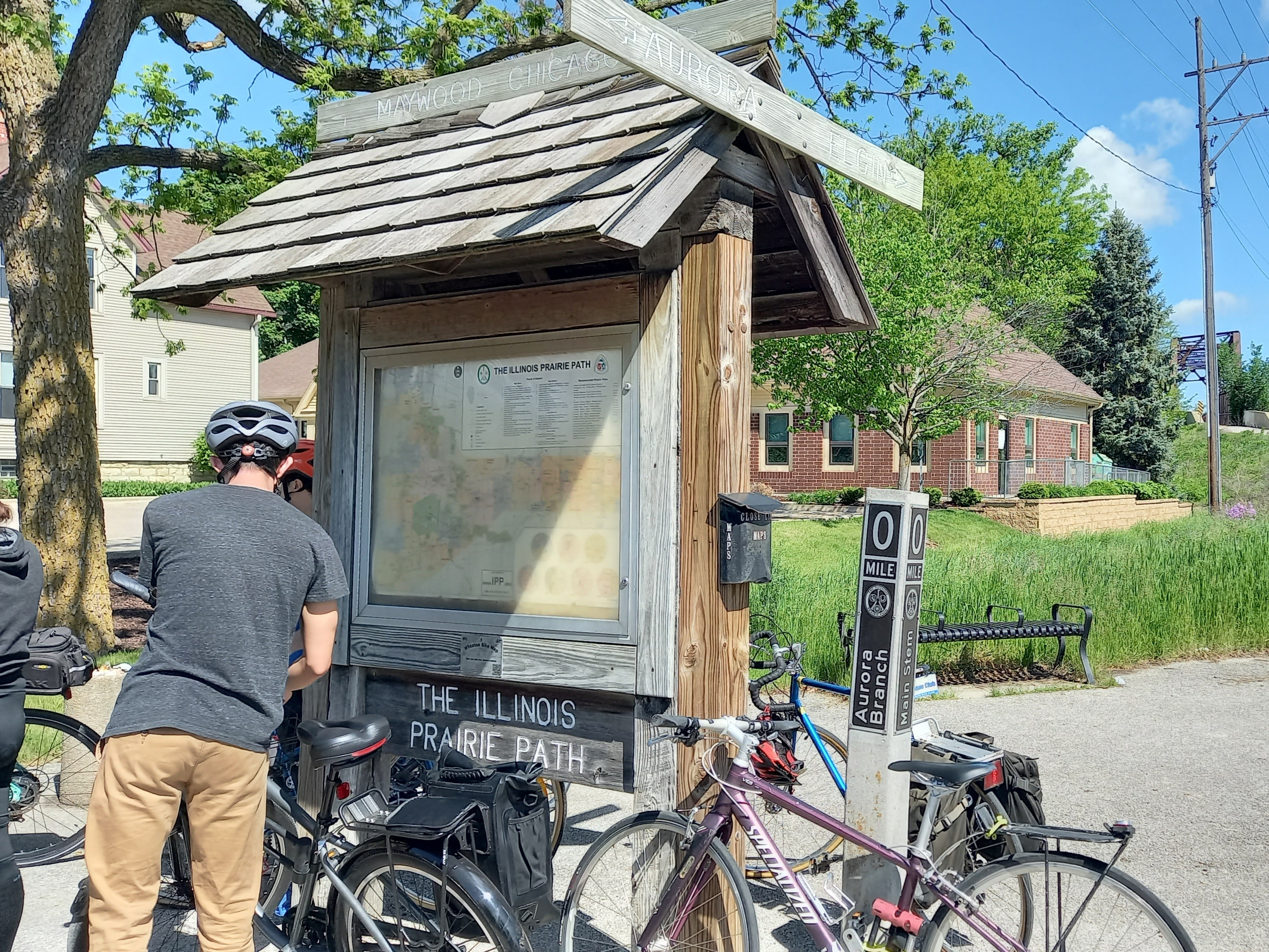
- Zero mile marker on the Illinois Prairie Path in Wheaton, Illinois
- Length: 61 mi (98 km)
- Location: Kane County, DuPage County, Cook County
- Established: 1963; 63 years ago
- Designation: CR 47; CR 48; CR 49; CR 57
- Trailheads: Maywood; South Elgin (Elgin Branch); Geneva (Geneva Spur); Batavia (Batavia Spur); Aurora (Aurora Branch)
- Website: ipp.org

Trail map
- Main Stem Aurora Branch Elgin Branch Batavia Spur Geneva Spur

The Illinois Prairie Path (often called the Prairie Path and abbreviated IPP) is a network of 61 miles (98 km) of bicycle trails, mostly in DuPage County, Illinois. Portions of the trail extend west to Kane County and east to Cook County. Most of the trail is categorized as rail-to-trail, meaning that the bicycle path is built atop a converted former railroad right of way. In the case of the Prairie Path, the vast majority of its routing runs on the former right-of-way of the Chicago Aurora and Elgin Railroad.

May Theilgaard Watts is credited for a letter written in 1963 that initiated the first project in what became a widespread rail-to-trails program of land use across the United States. In August 2008, the Illinois Prairie Path was inducted into the Rails-to-Trails hall of fame.

== Routing ==
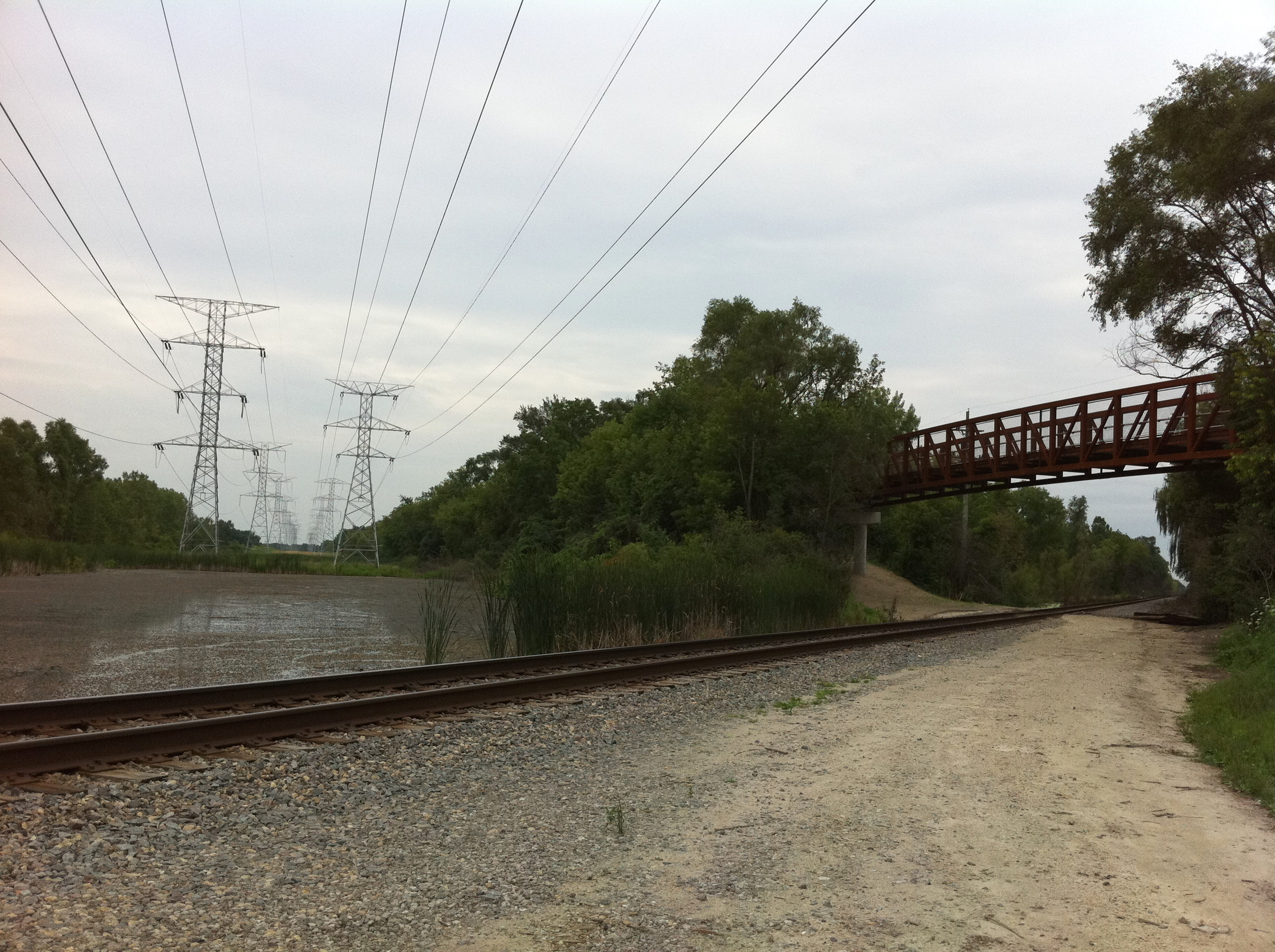
Illinois Prairie Path bridge over the Elgin, Joliet and Eastern Railroad in Wayne, Illinois

The Illinois Prairie Path consists of three distinct branches originating from a point just west of downtown Wheaton (41°51′51.0″N 88°6′58.4″W). The northwest branch is called the Elgin Branch and runs approximately 16 miles (26 km) to Elgin, where it intersects with the Fox River Trail 42°0′49.1″N 88°16′29.2″W). This branch is the longest of the three. The southwest branch is called the Aurora Branch and runs approximately 14 miles (23 km) to RiverEdge Park in Aurora, where it, too, intersects with the Fox River Trail (41°46′14.5″N 88°18′28.1″W). The eastern branch is known as the Main Stem and runs 15 miles (24 km) east to Forest Park at the Forest Park CTA station, where it crosses the historic Elmhurst Great Western Prairie 41°52′27.4″N 87°49′0.3″W).

All three branches are marked with concrete mile markers stating the name of the branch, and how many miles away from Wheaton the rider is. The frequency and character of these markers varies from county to county.

After the path's conception, spurs were added to the system extending west from the Elgin Branch to Geneva (known as the Geneva Spur) and west from the Aurora Branch to Batavia (known as the Batavia Spur). These spur branches are 6 and 5 miles (10 and 9 km) long respectively, and are also marked with mile markers.

The Prairie Path is part of a larger regional network of trails in the Chicago metropolitan area. The Elgin Branch and Main Stem are part of the 575-mile (925 km) long Grand Illinois Trail in north-central Illinois. On a more local level, the Prairie Path intersects with Kane County's Fox River Trail four times, and the Great Western Trail—a parallel connector between the Main Stem at Lombard and the Elgin Branch. Future connections are planned to the West Branch DuPage River Trail, the East Branch DuPage River Trail, and the Salt Creek Trail.

The DuPage County Department of Transportation maintains internal designations for the Illinois Prairie Path as a part of the county's highway system. County Highway 47 refers to the Main Stem and the Aurora Branch. County Highway 48 refers to the Elgin Branch. County Highway 49 refers to the Batavia Spur, while County Highway 57 refers to the Geneva Spur.

== History ==
The concept of a regional trail in DuPage County was introduced in 1963 by May Theilgaard Watts, a leading figure at the Morton Arboretum. In a letter to the editor of the Chicago Tribune, she called for the Chicago, Aurora and Elgin Electric Railroad right-of-way to be preserved for future generations instead of being given over to development. After eight years of contentious meetings between Watts and her representatives, and those of the towns of Wheaton and Glen Ellyn (who sought the right-of-way as valuable parking space), U.S. Secretary of the Interior Rogers C.B. Morton designated the Illinois Prairie Path as the second of 27 new National Trails. In the designation, Mrs. Watts was honored "for her outstanding efforts toward establishment of the Illinois Prairie Path." Although the IPP was the first Rail Trail proposed in the US, the Elroy-Sparta State Trail in Wisconsin was completed and opened first.

On August 23, 2006, a new pedestrian bridge was lifted into place over the Des Plaines River between Maywood and Forest Park. The bridge and new approaches permit a direct crossing over the Des Plaines River, allowing the main stem of the Prairie Path to terminate further east, at the Forest Park station. The bridge and approaches opened in late October 2006, after lighting and emergency call boxes were installed.

In 2014, North Central College became the home to the Prairie Path's official archives.
