= Lenae Williams =

American basketball player (born 1979)

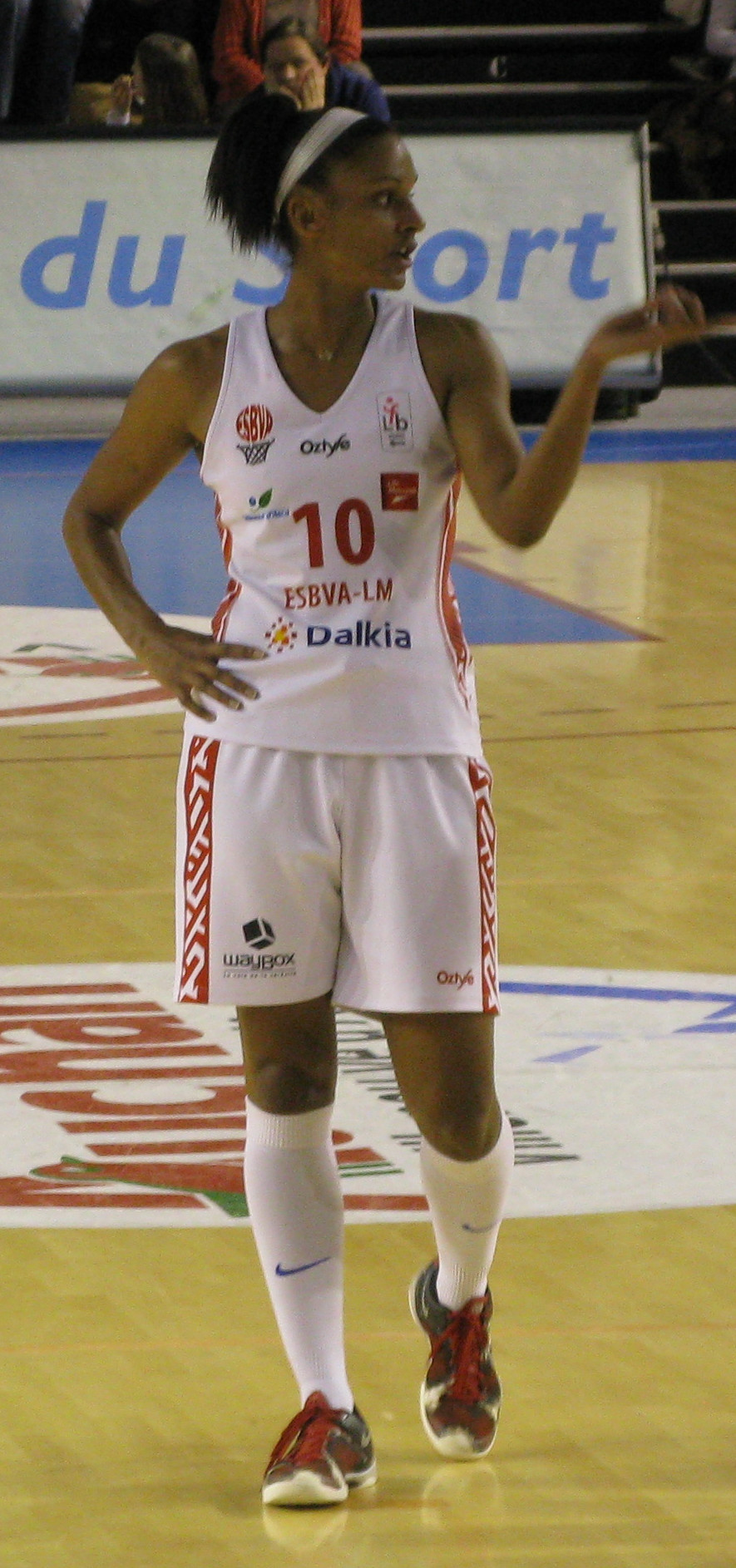

Personal information
- Born: July 14, 1979 (age 47) Chicago, Illinois, U.S.
- Listed height: 180 cm (5 ft 11 in)

Career information
- WNBA draft: 2002: 2nd round, 18th overall pick
- Playing career: 2002–2014
- Position: Shooting guard / small forward

Career history
- 2002: Detroit Shock
- 2007–2011: Mondeville
- 2011–2012: Nantes
- 2012–2014: Villeneuve-d'Ascq

Career highlights
- First-team All-Conference USA (2002); 2× Second-team All-Conference USA (2000, 2001); Conference USA All-Freshman Team (1999)
- Stats at Basketball Reference

Lenae Teresa Fergerson (born Lenae Teresa Williams on July 14, 1979) is an American professional basketball player.

A 6'1" guard-forward from Addison, Illinois and DePaul University, she played 27 games for the Detroit Shock of the WNBA in 2002. She averaged 2.7 points per game in her WNBA career.

She as played for the ESB Villeneuve-d'Ascq in France.

== Career statistics ==
Legend
GP	Games played	GS	Games started	MPG	Minutes per game	RPG	Rebounds per game
APG	Assists per game	SPG	Steals per game	BPG	Blocks per game	PPG	Points per game
TO	Turnovers per game	FG%	Field-goal percentage	3P%	3-point field-goal percentage	FT%	Free-throw percentage
**Bold**	Career best	°	League leader

=== WNBA ===
WNBA regular season statistics
Year	Team	GP	GS	MPG	FG%	3P%	FT%	RPG	APG	SPG	BPG	TO	PPG
2002	Detroit	27	0	6.6	.297	.241	.000	0.7	0.1	0.1	0.0	0.5	2.7
**Career**	1 year, 1 team	27	0	6.6	.297	.241	.000	0.7	0.1	0.1	0.0	0.5	2.7

=== College ===
CUSA statistics
Year	Team	GP	GS	MPG	FG%	3P%	FT%	RPG	APG	SPG	BPG	TO	PPG
1998–99	DePaul	27			.385	**.404**	.707	2.5	0.9	1.0	0.1		11.0
1999–00	DePaul	29			.377	.353	.792	3.2	1.3	1.6	**0.2**		18.3
2000–01	DePaul	**31**			**.394**	.344	**.827**	3.0	2.1	1.4	**0.2**		18.2
2001–02	DePaul	29			.379	.343	.797	**5.0**	**2.3**	**1.7**	0.0		**22.5**
**Career**		116			.384	.357	.794	3.4	1.7	1.4	0.1		17.6

== Other awards and records ==
- Holds C-USA career record for three-point field goals made (330) and attempted (924)
- Set C-USA records for three-pointers made in a season (94) and a game (8) as a sophomore
