= Addison, Illinois =

- Village
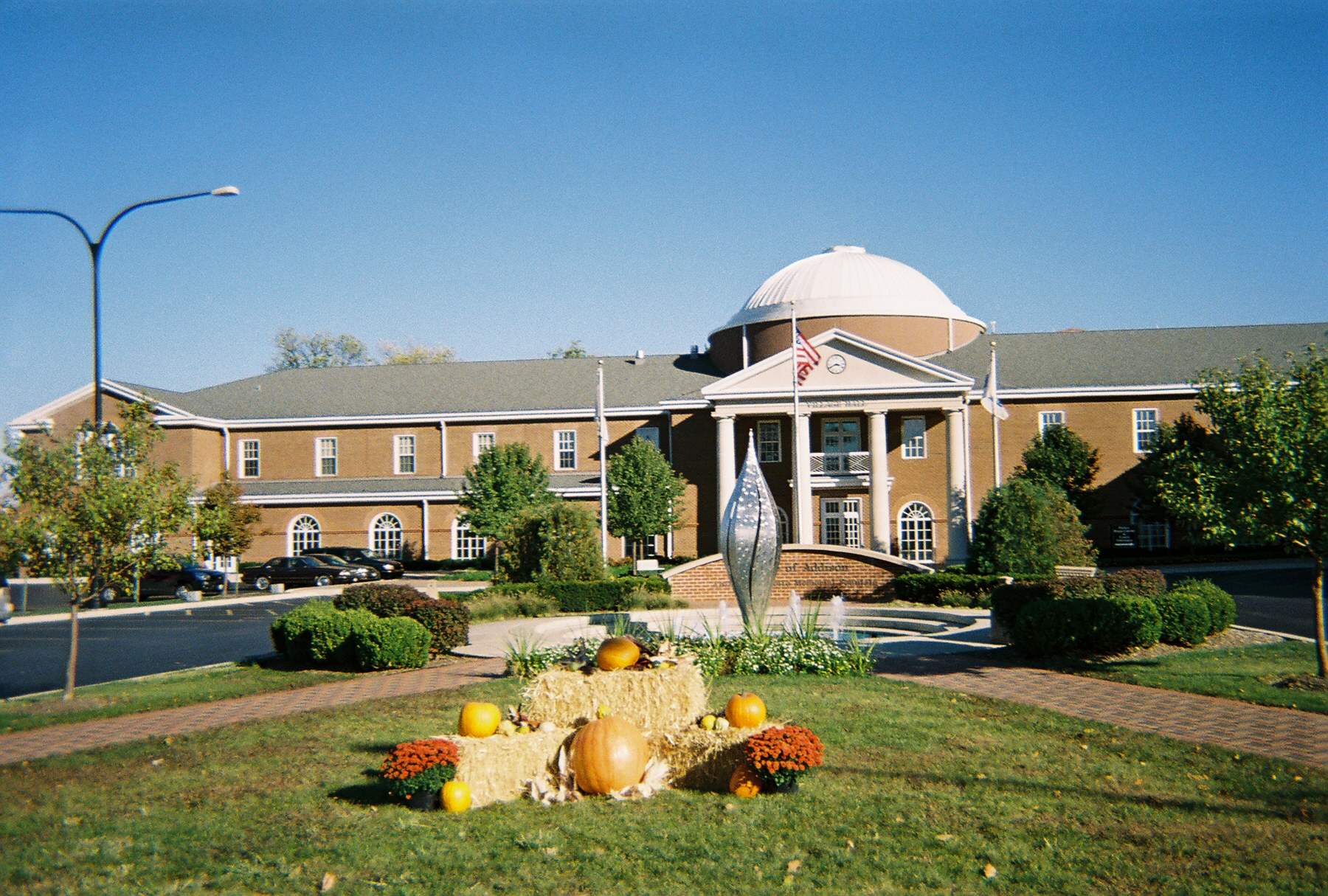
- Addison Village Hall

- Flag
- Interactive map of Addison, Illinois
- Location within Illinois Location within the United States Location within North America
- Coordinates: 41°55′54″N 88°0′8″W
- Country: United States
- State: Illinois
- County: DuPage
- Township: Addison, Bloomingdale
- Incorporated: 1884

Government
  - Type: Mayor-trustee
  - Mayor: Tom Hundley

Area
  - Total: 10.00 sq mi (25.90 km^{2})
  - Land: 9.83 sq mi (25.46 km^{2})
  - Water: 0.17 sq mi (0.44 km^{2}) 2.14%
- Elevation: 702 ft (214 m)

Population (2020)
  - Total: 35,702
  - Density: 3,632.4/sq mi (1,402.49/km^{2})

Standard of living (2020)
  - Per capita income: $37,451 (median: $82,547)
  - Home value: $189,036 (median: $173,200 (2000))
- Time zone: UTC-6 (CST)
  - Summer (DST): UTC-5 (CDT)
- ZIP code(s): 60101
- Area code(s): 630 and 331
- Geocode: 00243
- FIPS code: 17-00243
- GNIS feature ID: 2397911
- Website: www.addisonadvantage.org

Addison is a village in DuPage County, Illinois, United States. The population was 35,702 at the 2020 Census. It is part of the Chicago metropolitan area.

== History ==
The village was incorporated in 1884, at which time it had a population of 400. The community itself was originally named Dunkley's Grove after the settler Hezekiah Dunklee, and was renamed after a town in England or Addison, New York. In 1832, Winfield Scott built Army Trail Road on top of a Potawatomi trail in Addison, in order to allow 50 broad-tired wagons to fight Black Hawk and his warriors. In 1864, the Lutheran Church–Missouri Synod moved its teacher training to the village from Fort Wayne, Indiana, and established the Addison Teachers Seminary; it remained in Addison until 1913, when it was relocated to River Forest, Illinois, as Concordia Teachers College (now Concordia University Chicago). The town was also home to the Kinderheim home for children, which made up more than half its population prior to suburbanization.

The town began to suburbanize in the 1960s when developers started to build homes on what was farmland. The population grew from just under a thousand in 1930 to 35,000 people in 1990.

Adventureland amusement park was located in Addison (Lake and Medinah) during the 1960s and 1970s. The Addison Industrial District was the proposed location for the reconstruction of Comiskey Park in the late 1980s before this was voted down.

== Geography ==
The Village of Addison lies on Salt Creek, a tributary of the Des Plaines River.

According to the 2021 census gazetteer files, Addison has a total area of 10.00 square miles (25.90 km^{2}), of which 9.83 square miles (25.46 km^{2}) (or 98.29%) is land and 0.17 square miles (0.44 km^{2}) (or 1.71%) is water.

== Demographics ==
Historical population
Census	Pop.	Note	%±
1890	485		—
1900	591		21.9%
1910	579		−2.0%
1920	510		−11.9%
1930	916		79.6%
1940	819		−10.6%
1950	813		−0.7%
1960	6,741		729.2%
1970	24,482		263.2%
1980	29,826		21.8%
1990	32,058		7.5%
2000	35,914		12.0%
2010	36,942		2.9%
2020	35,702		−3.4%
U.S. Decennial Census

=== Racial and ethnic composition ===
Addison village, Illinois – Racial and ethnic composition Note: the US Census treats Hispanic/Latino as an ethnic category. This table excludes Latinos from the racial categories and assigns them to a separate category. Hispanics/Latinos may be of any race.
Race / Ethnicity (NH = Non-Hispanic)	Pop 2000	Pop 2010	Pop 2020	% 2000	% 2010	% 2020
White alone (NH)	21,540	17,562	14,710	59.98%	47.54%	41.20%
Black or African American alone (NH)	874	1,355	1,166	2.43%	3.67%	3.27%
Native American or Alaska Native alone (NH)	44	55	40	0.12%	0.15%	0.11%
Asian alone (NH)	2,836	2,706	2,867	7.90%	7.32%	8.03%
Pacific Islander alone (NH)	5	3	3	0.01%	0.01%	0.01%
Other race alone (NH)	35	48	107	0.10%	0.13%	0.30%
Mixed race or Multiracial (NH)	382	400	524	1.06%	1.08%	1.47%
Hispanic or Latino (any race)	10,198	14,813	16,285	28.40%	40.10%	45.61%
Total	35,914	36,942	35,702	100.00%	100.00%	100.00%

=== 2020 census ===
As of the 2020 census, Addison had a population of 35,702. There were 9,165 families residing in the village, and the population density was 3,570.20 inhabitants per square mile (1,378.46/km^{2}). The median age was 38.1 years; 22.7% of residents were under the age of 18 and 15.0% were 65 years of age or older. For every 100 females there were 100.2 males, and for every 100 females age 18 and over there were 99.2 males age 18 and over.

100.0% of residents lived in urban areas, while 0.0% lived in rural areas.

There were 12,296 households in Addison, of which 35.7% had children under the age of 18 living in them. Of all households, 53.6% were married-couple households, 16.7% were households with a male householder and no spouse or partner present, and 23.4% were households with a female householder and no spouse or partner present. About 19.9% of all households were made up of individuals and 8.3% had someone living alone who was 65 years of age or older.

There were 12,682 housing units at an average density of 1,268.20 per square mile (489.65/km^{2}), of which 3.0% were vacant. The homeowner vacancy rate was 0.8% and the rental vacancy rate was 4.0%.

=== Income and poverty ===
The median income for a household in the village was $68,534, and the median income for a family was $79,011. Males had a median income of $42,038 versus $30,828 for females. The per capita income for the village was $30,202. About 10.3% of families and 13.5% of the population were below the poverty line, including 26.3% of those under age 18 and 8.4% of those age 65 or over.

== Economy ==
Addison’s economy is supported by a mix of logistics, manufacturing, food distribution, and corporate offices, reflecting its proximity to major interstates and O’Hare International Airport. The village’s 2025 financial report highlights continued investment in industrial redevelopment, retail corridor improvements, and capital projects such as the Addison Community Care Center and veterans memorial expansion.

According to the village’s FY2025 Annual Comprehensive Financial Report, the largest employers include:

Principal employers – 2025
Rank	Employer	Employees
1	United Parcel Service (UPS)	1,700
2	Parts Town LLC	1,000
3	The Pampered Chef	700
4	Walmart	350
5	Porter Pipe & Supply	300
6	Veritiv Operating Company	250
7	SWD, Inc.	200
8	Republic Services	200
9	Insight	150
10	Option Care	140

== Arts and culture ==
- Addison Public Library: Officially opened in 1962 and a new building opened in 2008. Recognized with Award for Excellence in Reference and Adult Library Services in 2024 by the American Library Association.
- Addison Perspective
- Addison Center for the Arts

== Government ==
Addison operates under a mayor–trustee (village board) form of government, with trustees and the village president elected at large to four-year terms. Tom Hundley is the current Mayor of Addison. Other elected officials include Village Trustees Sam Nasti, Maria Reyes, Cathy Kluczny, Dawn O'Brien, and Jay DelRosario, and Village Clerk Lucille Zucchero. The town of Triggiano, Italy, is the sister city of Addison.

In the Illinois Senate, Addison is represented by Don Harmon (D-Oak Park) and Seth Lewis (R-Bartlett). In the Illinois House of Representatives it is represented by Jennifer Sanalitro (R-Hanover Park), Diane Blair-Sherlock (D-Villa Park). and Norma Hernandez (D-Melrose Park).

In the U.S. Congress, Addison is represented within three congressional districts by representatives Sean Casten (IL-06), Raja Krishnamoorthi (IL-08), and Delia Ramirez (IL-03), as well as senators Dick Durbin and Tammy Duckworth.

== Education ==
Addison is home to Addison Trail High School and to Indian Trail Junior High School. The elementary schools are: Ardmore, Wesley Elementary, Lake Park Elementary, Fullerton Elementary, Army Trail Elementary, Lincoln Elementary, and Stone Elementary. St. Philip the Apostle, a private Catholic school and parish, is located in Addison and serves students from pre-kindergarten through 8th grade. Driscoll Catholic High School was located in Addison before closing in 2009. DeVry University and Chamberlain College of Nursing also call Addison home. Addison also has an Early Learning Center for 3-5-year-old students in Pre-K.

== Transportation ==
Pace provides bus service on Routes 711 and 715 connecting Addison to Wheaton and other destinations.

In the 1990s, Addison was one of six communities that competed to receive a prototype personal rapid transit system that the Regional Transit Authority was planning to build. A proposal by Rosemont was instead selected, and such a system was ultimately never built.

== Notable people ==
- Adam Amin, sportscaster with ESPN and NBC Sports Chicago, raised in Addison and a graduate of Addison Trail High School
- Mark Anelli, former tight end for the San Francisco 49ers and St. Louis Rams
- Tim Breslin, professional hockey player who played left wing for the Chicago Wolves
- Jim Ellison, founder of the legendary Power Pop band, Material Issue, along with Ted Ansani and Mike Zelenko
- Jamie Freveletti, author of the Covert-One series novels The Janus Reprisal and The Geneva Strategy
- Bobby Hull, Hockey Hall of Fame inductee who lived in Addison from 1963 to 1971 while playing left wing for the Chicago Black Hawks
- Brett Hull, hall of fame professional hockey player and son of Bobby Hull who grew up in Addison from 1964 to 1971
- George Ireland, men's basketball coach who led the Loyola Ramblers to win the 1963 NCAA championship. He died in Addison
- Kyle Kinane, stand-up comedian and actor (Those Who Can't, Love, @midnight), raised in Addison and a graduate of Addison Trail High School
- Hubert J. Loftus, lawyer and politician
- Tony Pasquesi, defensive lineman for the Chicago Cardinals from 1955 to 1957, a resident of Addison at the time of his death
- Rob Renzetti, animator and creator of My Life as a Teenage Robot, raised in Addison
- Mike Retondo, bassist for the Plain White T's
- Mark Rodenhauser, an American football player who played center for seven NFL teams from 1987 to 1999, played football at Addison Trail High School
- Alexa Scimeca Knierim, pair skater, 5-time U.S. national champion, two-time Olympian and winner of the 2022 World Figure Skating Championships with partner Brandon Frazier, 2015 U.S. Figure Skating Championships with her then-fiancé Chris Knierim, raised in Addison and a graduate of Addison Trail High School
- Rocco Sisto, actor best known for playing young Junior Soprano on The Sopranos
- Gabriel Slonina, soccer player who was the youngest starting goalkeeper in Major League Soccer history and the youngest to record a clean sheet
- Leon Spinks, World Boxing Council and World Boxing Association heavyweight world champion who resided in Addison after his retirement from boxing
- Lina Trivedi, involved with creation of (Beanie Babies), resident of Addison for most of her school-age and young-adult life and a graduate of Addison Trail High School
- Lenae Williams, basketball player who played guard-forward for the Detroit Shock during the 2002 WNBA season
- Kathleen Willis, member of the Illinois House of Representatives whose district includes the eastern half of the city, of which she is a resident
