= Tony Pasquesi =

American football player (1933–2016)

No. 75
- Positions: Defensive lineman, linebacker

Personal information
- Born: June 13, 1933; Chicago, Illinois, U.S.
- Died: August 23, 2016 (aged 83); Addison, Illinois, U.S.
- Listed height: 6 ft 4 in (1.93 m)
- Listed weight: 250 lb (113 kg)

Career information
- High school: St. Phillip High School
- College: Notre Dame
- NFL draft: 1955: 3rd round, 32nd overall pick

Career history
- Chicago Cardinals (1955–1957)

Career NFL statistics
- Fumble recoveries: 1
- Stats at Pro Football Reference

Anthony Leonard "Tony" Pasquesi (June 13, 1933 – August 23, 2016) was an American professional football defensive lineman in the National Football League. After playing college football at Notre Dame, Pasquesi was drafted by the Chicago Cardinals in the third round (32nd overall) of the 1955 NFL draft. He played three seasons for the Chicago Cardinals (1955–1957). He died in 2016 at the age of 83 in Addison, Illinois where he lived.
