= Arts and Technology High School =

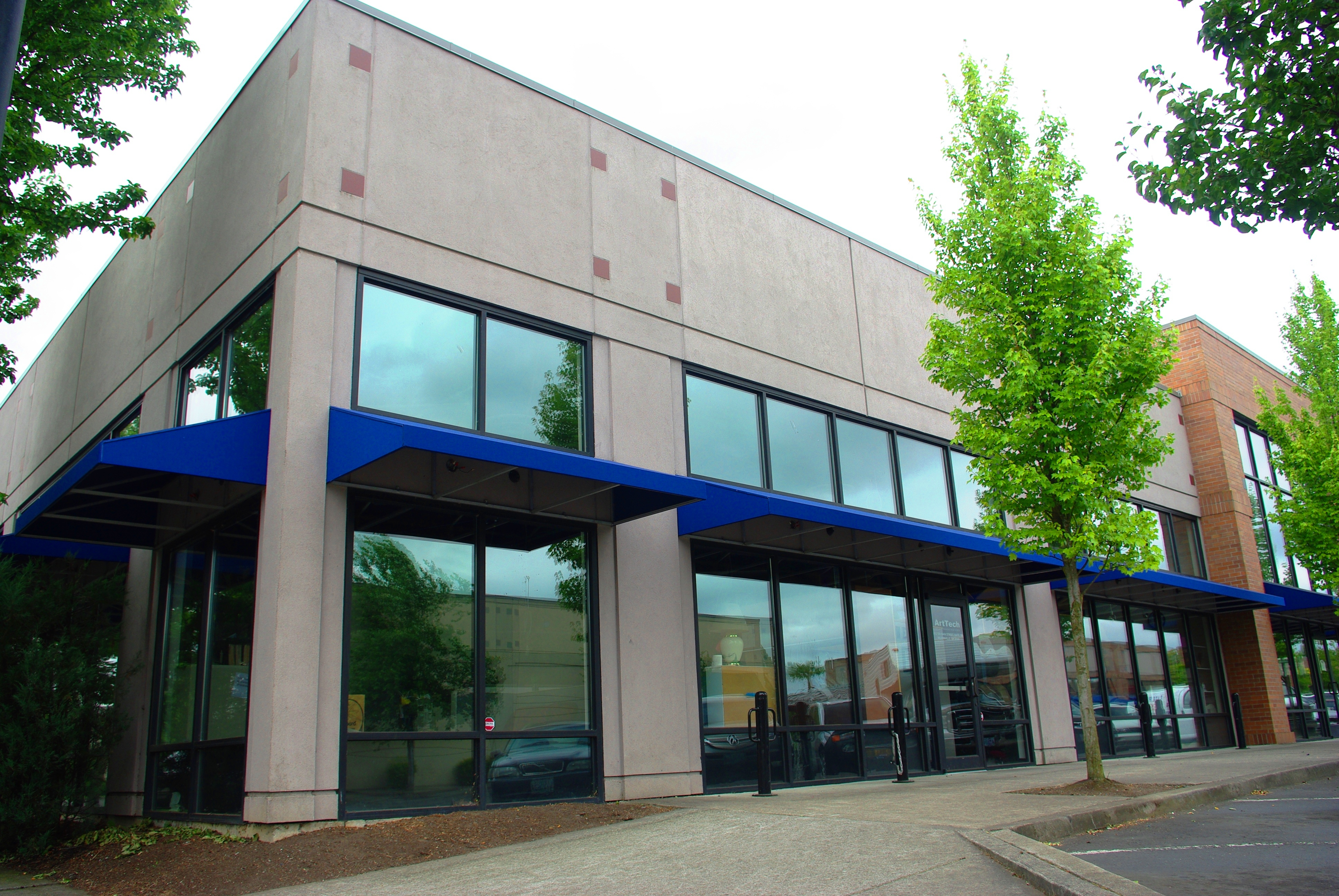

Location
- 8502 SW Main Street; Wilsonville, (Clackamas County), Oregon 97070; United States; 45.302113°N 122.764149°W

Information
- Type: Public charter
- Opened: 2005
- Closed: 2022
- School district: West Linn-Wilsonville School District
- Teaching staff: 11.00 (FTE)
- Grades: 9-12
- Enrollment: 80 (2020–21)
- Student to teacher ratio: 8.91
- Website: www.arttech.wlwv.k12.or.us

Arts and Technology High School, known as ATHS or ArtTech, was a public charter high school in Wilsonville, Oregon, United States. Part of the West Linn-Wilsonville School District, the school opened in 2005. it closed at the end of the 2021-2022 school year. The main Art Tech campus as well as the adjacent Kiva Administration Building have since been turned back over to the City of Wilsonville (the owners of the buildings), and are now utilizing it for various purposes.

== Academics ==
In 2008, 83% of the school's seniors received a high school diploma. Of 24 students, 20 graduated, 2 dropped out, and two were still in high school in 2009.
