= Glenbard West High School =

High school in Glen Ellyn, Illinois, US

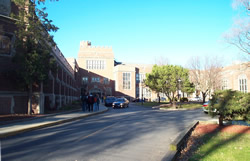

Location
- 670 Crescent Boulevard; Glen Ellyn, DuPage County, Illinois 60137; United States; 41°52′46″N 88°03′37″W

Information
- Type: Public secondary
- Motto: Pride, Tradition, Excellence
- Established: May 15, 1923; 103 years ago
- School district: Glenbard Twp. H.S. 87
- Superintendent: David Larson
- Principal: Ben Peterselli (2023-)
- Staff: 208
- Teaching staff: 132.38 (on an FTE basis)
- Grades: 9-12
- Gender: coed
- Enrollment: 2,313 (2023-2024)
- Average class size: 26.1
- Student to teacher ratio: 17.47
- Campus: Suburban
- Colours: Glenbard Green (Pantone 626); White
- Athletics conference: West Suburban (Silver) Conference
- Nickname: Hilltoppers
- Publication: Byzantium
- Newspaper: The Glen Bard
- Yearbook: Pinnacle
- Website: www.glenbardwesths.org

Glenbard West High School is a public four-year high school located at the corner of Ellyn Avenue and Crescent Boulevard in Glen Ellyn, a western suburb of Chicago, Illinois, in the United States. It is part of Glenbard Township High School District 87. The West campus draws students from Glen Ellyn (primarily north of Illinois Route 38), a small portion of Lombard, and portions of Wheaton, Glendale Heights and Carol Stream.

== History ==
=== Glen Ellyn High School 1915−1922 ===
The need for high schools arose with developed communities in the late 1800s. Wheaton voters wanted their own high school but accepted Glen Ellyn students on a tuition basis. In the fall of 1915, Wheaton raised the tuition rates and Glen Ellyn residents decided to start their own high school. Classes were rented on the second floor of the DuPage Bank Building, founded by Arthur. W. Holzman as Principal on October 4, 1915, hosting to fifty Freshmen and Sophomores. From 1915 to 1918 the first high school that area students attended was called Glen Ellyn High School. By 1916 the bank built on a third floor to accommodate the growing student body.

America entered World War I on April 2, 1917, and Glen Ellyn residents petitioned the school board citing German language fueled propaganda which they did not want in their school curriculum. Arthur Holzman, an American citizen who was born Canadian, became a controversial topic which put newly elected Glen Ellyn school board president Louis J. Thiele in a difficult predicament, to delegate a successor. (As for the school's future of teaching German, a German Club would not form for another 45 years, 17 years following the end of World War II.)

When Fred L. Biester took over this office in 1918 at Mr. Holzman's recommendation to Mr. Thiele, the faculty consisted of five members who instructed 120 students in a basic curriculum. By 1920, class enrollment quickly outgrew the space and spread between the bank building and local church basements. The administrators decided to search for a site to build a dedicated high school building.

=== Glenbard Township High School 1922−1959 ===
In preparation for this growth, the district purchased a site on Honeysuckle Hill from Charles R. Raymond in April 1919—twenty-five acres for the price of US$8,000 ($19.23, accounting for inflation). Lake Ellyn, which then covered the present football field, was purchased for an additional dollar. In 1923, the high school deeded the lake to the park board with the stipulation that it revert to the high school should it ever cease to be a lake.

Neighboring Lombard residents learned that Honeysuckle Hill was within one-half mile of the geographical center of the proposed district and their unification would enable the towns to establish a school as large as any in the county, with an attendance of about two hundred pupils. A contest was held among the students to name the districts and the merging of 'Glen' Ellyn and Lom'bard' officially became "Glenbard" on May 15, 1923.

The current building opened in 1923 as Glenbard Township High School, the first of the district's high schools. It was built in the style of a castle, complete with roof turret by the firm of Coolidge and Hodgeson, the architects who planned Chicago's Art Institute, the Chicago Public Library (a.k.a. the Chicago Cultural Center), and Saint Olaf College.

=== Glenbard West (GBW) 1959−Present ===
Glenbard East High School opened in Lombard, September 1959. Glenbard North High School opened in Carol Stream, August 1968. Glenbard South opened in Glen Ellyn in 1972.

== Facilities ==
Glenbard, as it was named by Glen Ellyn and Lombard townships, was constructed in 1922 atop Honeysuckle Hill, overlooking Lake Ellyn. Built with dark red brick, the building was built with castle-like design, complete with a turret and other minor castle details. Glenbard West also has a tower known as the sixth floor. From the window of the sixth floor tower, the Willis (formerly Sears) Tower in downtown Chicago can be seen on a clear day. Many more recent students of West and other local teens sometimes jokingly refer to the school as "Hogwarts", as some see its architecture a physical resemblance to the school from the "Harry Potter" series.

Athletics were initially played in a gymnasium, built in 1936, in the school building itself, but with the construction of a $12 million state of-the-art field house across the street (nicknamed the Peter "Commish" Mastandrea Field House after the long time and beloved P.E Teacher who retired at the end of 2021–22 school year), the former gym was turned into the Robert D. Elliott Library, named after one of the most influential principals in the school's history. Biester Gym was built in 1958.

Across the road from Glenbard West is Memorial Field, where soccer, lacrosse, field hockey, and other sports are played. By the lake stands Bill Duchon Field, where football, girls' flag football, and track are played. Originally built in 1923, it was renamed in 1980 in honor of a head football coach who led West to several conference championships. The stadium seats up to 5,000 spectators, with the home side overlooking Lake Ellyn. In 2001, Duchon field was named by USA Today as one of the top 10 places to watch high school football.

Additions to the school were added beginning in 1926. The auditorium was built in 1931, and the East Wing in 1953. Glenbard East was built in 1959 in Lombard, and the original school became Glenbard West. There was a complete renovation of the school during the 1964–1965 school year, adding new choral, band, and physical science facilities. The George Zahrobsky Botanical Garden, Shakespeare Garden and Poets' Corner were added in later years. A new library and field house were completed in 2001, and the most recent additions, the science wings, were added in 2016.

== In media ==
=== Film and television ===
Bill Duchon Field was used to stage the football field scenes in the 1986 film Lucas, which featured rising stars such as Corey Haim, Charlie Sheen, and premiered Winona Ryder, Courtney Thorne-Smith, and Jeremy Piven. The school building was also used for shooting scenes. Glenbard West cheerleaders appeared as extras in the film, though the school colors and school name were changed.

The 1991 television documentary Yearbook was also filmed here.

=== Literature ===
It was also featured in the juvenile post-apocalyptic book The Girl Who Owned a City by O. T. Nelson.

== Academics ==
Glenbard West has made Adequate Yearly Progress on the Prairie State Achievement Examination, which with the ACT, comprise the assessments used in Illinois to fulfill the federal No Child Left Behind Act.

In 2015, U.S. News & World Report ranked Glenbard West #520 in the nation and 20th overall in Illinois. It is also referred to as a top high school resembling a college campus experience, which aids in preparing its student body to successfully attend even the largest of university campuses in and out of state.

Glenbard West has been ranked among the top 1500 public schools in the United States six times, according to Newsweek's challenge Index. In 2010, the school ranked #900. The school was previously ranked #1022 (2009), #954 (2008), #673 (2007), #626 (2006), #684 (2005), and #711 (2003).

== Activities ==
=== Active Clubs for the class of 2025 ===
- Aerospace Club
- Anime Club
- Bass Fishing Club
- Best Buddies
- Black Student Association
- Book Club
- Cheer Club
- Choir
- Chess Team
- Dance Team
- Delta Epsilon Phi (German)
- "Dice it up" Games Club
- Eco Club
- Fashion Club
- FCCLA Club (Family, Career, and Community Leaders of America)
- FIFA Club
- Forensics Club (Speech Team)
- French Club
- Future Teachers of America / GIVS- Glenbard Instructional Volunteer Senior-Leaders
- German Club
- The 'Glen Bard' Student Newspaper
- G.L.O. (Glenbard Latino Organization)
- The Glenbard West Historical Society
- Global Connect Club
- Interact Club
- International Club
- Internet Production Club
- Investment Club
- Jam Club
- Jazz Band
- Key Club
- La Société Honoraire de Français
- Math Team
- Medical Club
- MSA (Muslim Students Association)
- Model United Nations
- National Honor Society
- Operation One World
- Orchesis
- Orchestra
- Pinnacle (Yearbook)
- Prism (LGBTQ+ Alliance)
- Rho Kappa National Social Studies Honor Society
- Scholastic Bowl
- Science Olympiad
- Senior Mentors
- Sociedad Honoraria Hispanica
- South Asian Club
- Spanish Club
- STEM Club
- Steppers (Dance)
- Student Council
- Students for Students
- Students For the Protection of Animals (SFPA)
- Target Success
- That One Group (T.O.G.: Student-directed improv)
- Theatre
- Toadies (Technical theater)
- TV/Broadcast Club
- Ultimate Frisbee Club
- WGHS Radio Glenbard
- West Spirit/Superfans
- West Student Leadership
- Yoga Club
- Young Conservatives
1. The Forensics Club (Speech, Individual Events) won the team IHSA state championship trophy in 1991. Since then, the team has won numerous individual awards in State Finals. In 2010, the team tied for second overall.
2. The Theatre program performs in the Larry Shue Auditorium. In 2008, the school's production of How to Succeed in Business Without Really Trying was performed at the Illinois Theatrefest.
3. The Model United Nations team coached by Richard Kotrba, regularly annually competes at the Brown University, Harvard University, Northwestern University, University of Virginia, University of California, Berkeley, and University of Illinois, Urbana-Champaign Model UN Conferences. The team has received numerous awards at each of those conferences.

=== Annual Dances ===
The West Nation "Back to School" Dance, Homecoming, Heart Hop, and Prom.

== Athletics ==
Glenbard West competes in the West Suburban Conference. The school is also a member of the Illinois High School Association (IHSA), which governs most sports and competitive activities in Illinois. Teams are stylized as the Hilltoppers.

The school sponsors interscholastic teams for young men and women in basketball, cross country, golf, gymnastics, soccer, swimming & diving, tennis, track & field, boys' lacrosse, and volleyball. Young men may compete in baseball, football, lacrosse, basketball, wrestling, track & field, and cross country, while young women may compete in badminton, field hockey, gymnastics, dance, cheerleading, tennis, golf, swim, basketball, track & field, wrestling, lacrosse, soccer, volleyball, cross country, and softball.

=== State championships ===
- Basketball (boys): (2021–22)
- Cross country (boys): (1960–61)
- Cross country (girls): (2013–14)
- Football: (1983–84, 2012–13, 2015–16)
- Gymnastics (boys): (1995–96, 2016–17)
- Gymnastics (girls): (2017–18)
- Volleyball (girls): (1983–84, 2015–16)
- Volleyball (boys): (2014–15, 2015–16, 2016–17, 2021–22, 2022-23)
- Track and field (girls): (2016-2017)

=== School Spirit: Glenbard West Fight Song! ===
Oh, it's G-L-E-N-B-A-R-D

Oh, well, it's Glenbard, Glenbard fight again!

And for the school and team we love so well,

We're going to yell and yell and yell and yell and yell!

And when the teams in green and white appear,

With heads held high we stand and shout and cheer,

And for the school and team go on to fame

win this game.

Fight, team fight!

== Notable alumni ==
- Laurie Anderson (class of 1965), musician, songwriter, inventor, and performance artist
- Zak Bagans (class of 1995), investigator on Travel Channel's Ghost Adventures
- Samuel Bodman (class of 1956), U.S. Secretary of Energy (2005–2009)
- Paul Darcy Boles, author and advertising executive ("dropped out"), wrote the novel Glenport, Illinois
- Rob Boras, football coach; tight ends coach of the NFL's Buffalo Bills
- Matt Bowen (class of 1995), NFL defensive back (2000–06)
- Amy Carlson (class of 1986), actress in film and television (Alex Taylor on TV series Third Watch)
- Jeffery Deaver (class of 1968), mystery novelist; chosen as new author of the James Bond novels; created character Lincoln Rhyme in novels including The Bone Collector
- Alex Diab (class of 2015), member of the United States men's national artistic gymnastics team and alternate for the 2020 Summer Olympics
- Erin Gilreath (class of 1998), hammer throw at 2004 Olympics
- Alex Green (class of 1982), NFL defensive back (1987)
- Mike Hall (class of 2000), sportscaster and ESPN Dream Job winner
- Sean Hayes (class of 1988), Emmy Award-winning actor, best known for his role as Jack McFarland on television series Will & Grace
- Michael Herbick (class of 1967), Oscar-nominated sound mixer (Lonesome Dove, The Fugitive)
- Diane Holum (class of 1968), won Olympic silver and bronze medals (1968) and gold and silver medals (1972) in speed skating
- Braden Huff (class of 2022), college basketball player for the Gonzaga Bulldogs
- Jim Molinari (class of 1973), men's head basketball coach at Western Illinois, Minnesota, Bradley and Northern Illinois
- Alec Pierce (class of 2018), NFL Wide Receiver for the Indianapolis Colts drafted 53rd Overall in the 2022 NFL draft, Second Team All-AAC Wide Receiver for the Cincinnati Bearcats
- Bobby Rahal (class of 1971), auto racer and co-owner of Rahal Letterman Lanigan Racing; winning driver in the 1986 Indianapolis 500
- Nancy Reno (class of 1984), Olympic competitor in beach volleyball (1996), bronze medalist at the 1997 Beach Volleyball World Championships
- Peter Roskam (class of 1979), U.S. Congressman, representing Illinois's 6th congressional district (2007–2019)
- Janice Rule, actress, psychotherapist
- Larry Shue (class of 1964), playwright (The Foreigner)
- Gary Sinise, Emmy Award and Golden Globe-winning actor.
- John Shurna (class of 2008), all-time leading scorer at Northwestern University in men's basketball
- Phil Vischer (class of 1984), author, actor, and puppeteer; co-founded Veggie Tales
- Ted Wass (class of 1970), actor and director best known for his work on television (Blossom)
- Chris Watt (class of 2009), former NFL offensive lineman
- Brye Sebring (class of 2021), musician and songwriter
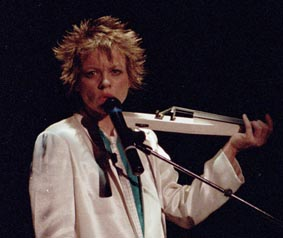
Laurie Anderson

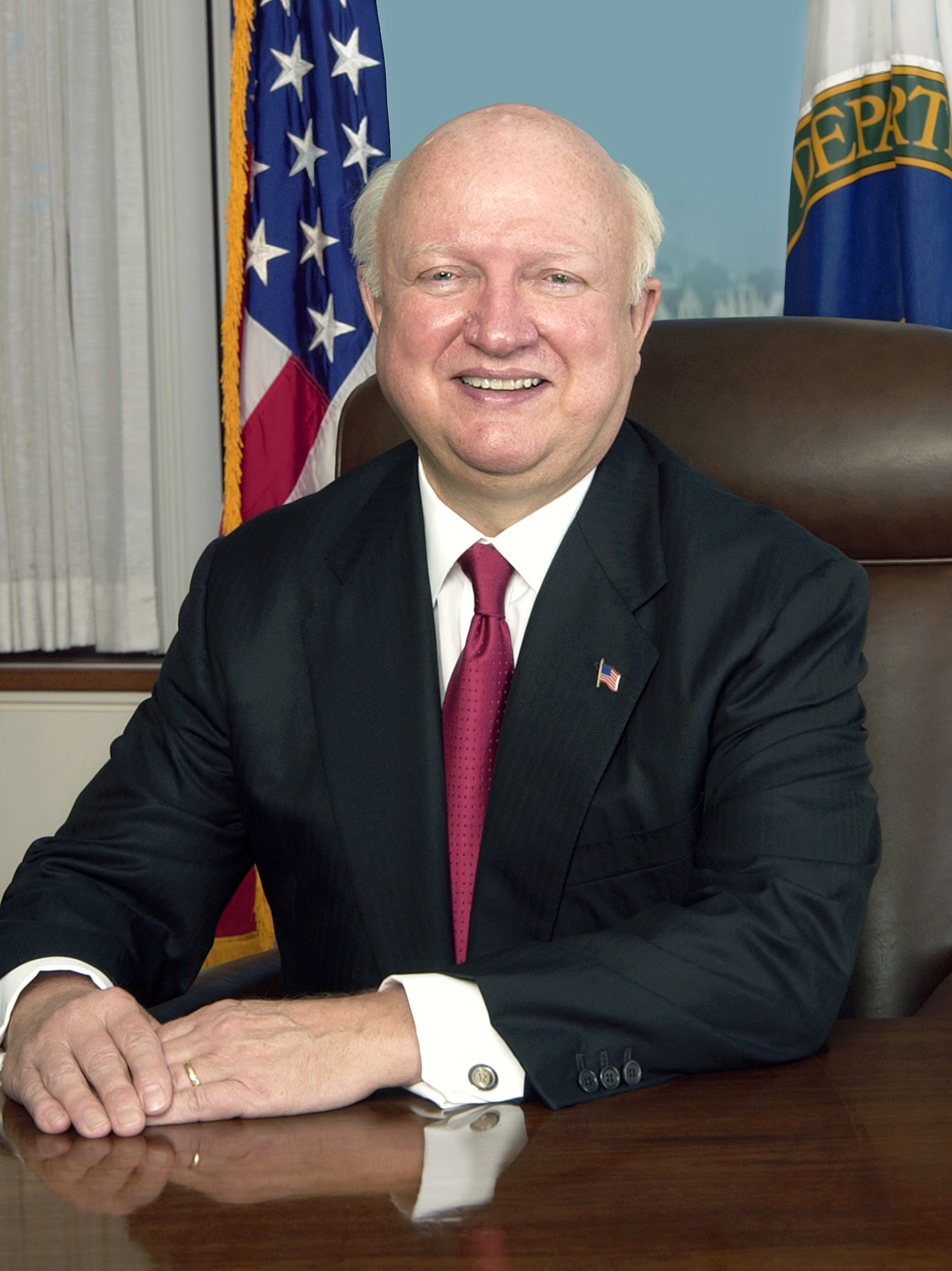
Samuel Bodman

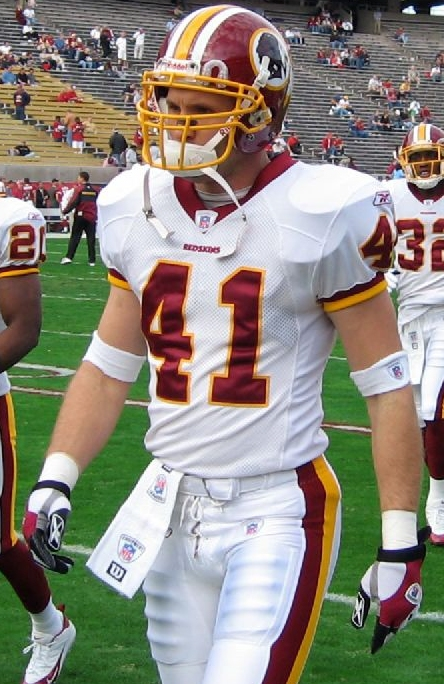
Matt Bowen

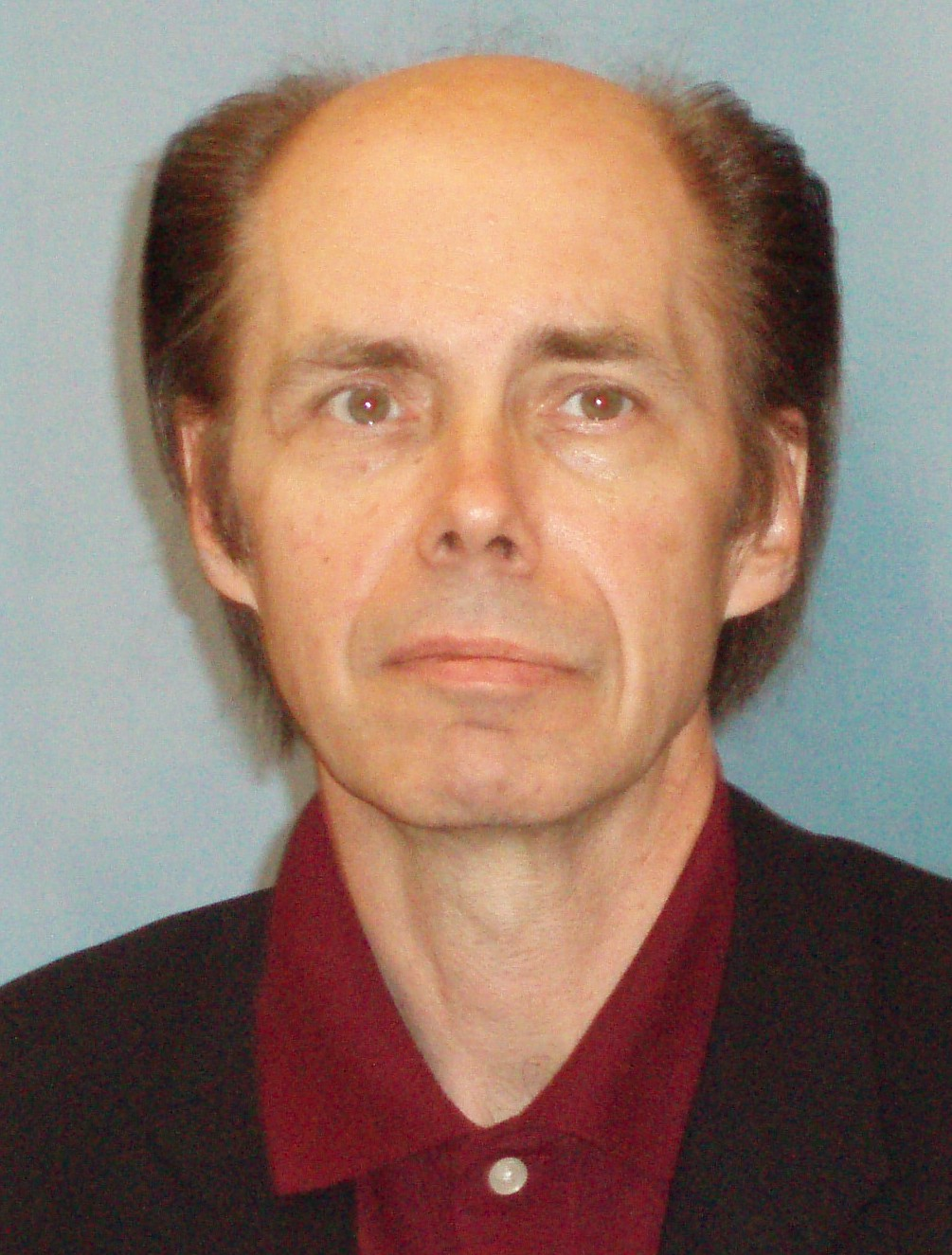
Jeffrey Deaver

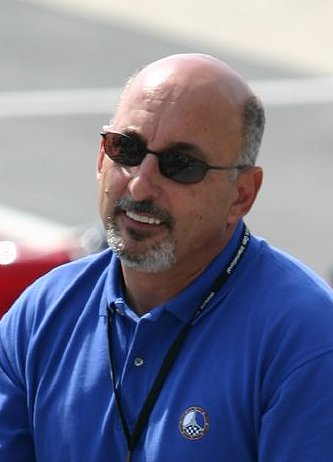
Bobby Rahal

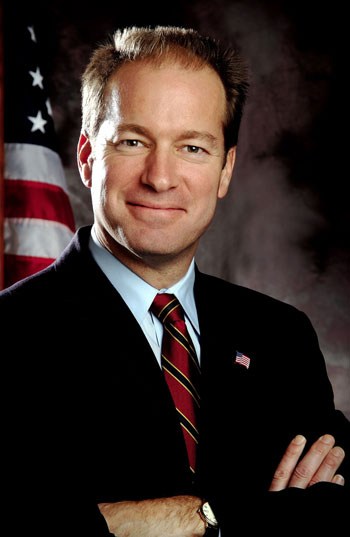
Peter Roskam
