= Glenbard Township High School District 87 =

School district in Illinois, United States

Address
- 596 Crescent Blvd. Glen Ellyn, Illinois, 60137; United States
- Coordinates: 41°52′39″N 88°03′46″W

District information
- Type: Public
- Established: 1916; 110 years ago
- Superintendent: David Larson
- Schools: High 4
- NCES District ID: 1716830

Students and staff
- Students: 8,032
- Teachers: 505
- Student–teacher ratio: 15.90

Other information
- Website: www.glenbard87.org

Glenbard Township High School District 87 is based in Glen Ellyn, Illinois, and consists of Glenbard South, Glenbard North, Glenbard East, and Glenbard West high schools. The term Glenbard is a portmanteau of Glen Ellyn and Lombard, the two predominant towns of the district.

== History ==
Glenbard Township High School was truly established in the 1922–1923 school year when students began their first full year of attendance on the campus of what is now Glenbard West High School. Students in Glen Ellyn had previously attended the Glen Ellyn High School, which was located on the second floor of the DuPage Bank Building. This school was founded in 1916 with Mr. A. W. Holzman as Principal. When Mr. Fred L. Biester took over the office in 1918, the faculty consisted of five members who instructed 120 students in a basic curriculum.

By 1920, the enrollment had far outgrown the bank building and the various church basements that had been called into service. A search began for a building site. "Honeysuckle Hill" was then purchased for the new high school. After the site had been chosen, Lombard asked to be included in the Glen Ellyn district. The two communities combined their efforts, and Glenbard High School was born.

Prior to the opening of Glenbard East in 1959, Lombard students in High School District No. 87 attended Glenbard West in Glen Ellyn (known at the time simply as Glenbard High School). The first Superintendent to serve the district was the late Fred L. Biester, who was Superintendent from 1918 until his death in 1962. In the spring of 1962, the Board of Education appointed Dr. Dean W. Stoakes as Superintendent, followed by Mr. Raymond Livingston in 1978 and Dr. Robert C. Stevens in 1984. Dr. Ron Smith was appointed as superintendent in May 1999. In 2002, Dr. Timothy Hyland was appointed superintendent. Dr. Mike Meissen was superintendent from 2006 until June 2012. Dr. David Larson became superintendent in July 2012.

Glenbard East High School opened its doors in September 1959. Glenbard North High School opened its doors in August 1968. Glenbard South High School opened its doors to students for the first time in the fall of 1972.

== Member schools ==
District 87 consists of four high schools. The four schools all share the name Glenbard, with each school named after a different cardinal direction.

=== Glenbard East High School ===
Glenbard East is located in Lombard, Illinois. The school mascot is the Ram(s). Its feeder schools include Westlake Middle School (Lombard) and Marquardt Middle School (Glendale Heights). Established in 1959, Glenbard East has a long tradition of prominence in the areas of arts and music. Under the leadership of Department chair Ross Kellan, with the submission from Orchestra Director Joanne May, the G.E. music program won a Grammy award in 2000.

=== Glenbard North High School ===
Glenbard North is located in Carol Stream, Illinois. The school's current principal is John Mensik. School mascot is the Panther(s). Its feeder schools are Jay Stream Middle School and Stratford Middle School (both from District 93) as well as Glenside Middle School (which is in District 16), in Glendale Heights. It has about 3000 students. Its school newspaper is The North Current, which is a member of the High School National Ad Network. The school is usually solid in several sports, including Wrestling, Girls Softball, Girls Track and Field, and Football.

=== Glenbard South High School ===
Glenbard South is located in Glen Ellyn, Illinois. The school mascot is the Raider(s). Its feeder schools are Glen Crest Middle School (located in district 89) and a small number of students previously attended Westlake Middle School. Its student population is about 1453. The Math team won state in 2006. It is known for its Softball team (State champions in the 2011–2012 and 2012–2013 seasons), also its Baseball, Cross-Country (State champs in 2001) and Track teams. Glenbard South moved conferences in 2013 in response to the disbanding of the Western Sun Conference. The football team went 18–6 from 2008 to 2009 and reached the quarterfinals in the playoffs both years. In 2013, its football team went undefeated in the regular season and made it to the second round of the IHSA playoffs in 2013, 2014 and 2015.

=== Glenbard West High School ===
Glenbard West is located in Glen Ellyn, Illinois. The school mascot is the Hilltopper(s). The 1991 television documentary Yearbook was filmed there. It was also featured in the book The Girl Who Owned a City by O. T. Nelson. Large portions of the 1986 film Lucas were shot in and around the school. The school is known for their main building resembling a castle, and the fact that the school sits atop a hill, hence the school mascot name, and sports teams are named the Hilltoppers. Some students from West, and also other local teens sometimes jokingly refer to the school as "Hogwarts", as some see its architecture a physical resemblance to the school seen in the "Harry Potter" series.

The main junior high that feeds into West is Hadley Junior High, Glen Ellyn's only Middle School, with also students from Glenside Middle School, the Junior High in Glendale Heights, and also students from other schools in the adjacent areas.

Girls and Boys Gymnastics have been very successful recently. In addition, the Forensics (Speech) team, led by Tony Crowley, is generally regarded as one of the best in the state. Its less publicized, Scholastic Bowl Team, typically place and annually compete in Scholastic Bowl Play-Offs every season end. The Baseball team, led by Coach James Fornaciari made consecutive visits to the Illinois elite eight in 2002 and 2003.

Glenbard West football is one of the best programs in the state and in the nation always being in the Top 10 overall in the state and winning its division (7A previously, 8A in 2014). It won state in the 1983–84, 2012–2013 and the 2015–2016 seasons, being the runner up in 1976–77 and in 2009–2010 seasons. Its program is also sponsored by Nike.

== Notable alumni ==
- Billy Corgan, leader of the Smashing Pumpkins and former member of Zwan, graduated from high school at Glenbard North in Carol Stream.
- Dan Tani, a NASA astronaut, graduated from Glenbard East High School in Lombard.
- Sean Hayes, the actor who plays Jack McFarland on the NBC comedy Will & Grace graduated from Glenbard West High School in Glen Ellyn.
- Laurie Anderson, a musician and performance/visual artist who has made groundbreaking contributions using technology in the arts, graduated from Glenbard West High School in Glen Ellyn.
- Ryan Diem, an offensive lineman for the Indianapolis Colts graduated from Glenbard North High School in Carol Stream.
- Ted Wass, star of such TV series as Soap and Blossom and such films as Curse of the Pink Panther, Oh God! You Devil, and The Longshot, and director of many TV episodes, such as Two and a Half Men, Spin City, and Caroline in the city, graduated from Glenbard West High School in Glen Ellyn in 1970.
- Bobby Rahal, winner of the 1986 Indianapolis 500, race car driver, and IndyCar team owner (winner in the 2004 Indianapolis 500), graduated from Glenbard West High School in Glen Ellyn in 1971.
- Justin Jackson, running back for the Los Angeles Chargers, graduated from Glenbard North High School in 2014.
