= Glenbard North High School =

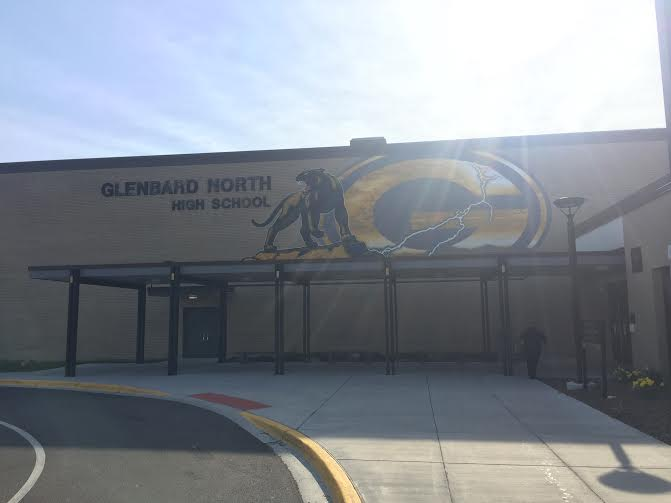
- Glenbard North High School, home of the Panthers

Location
- 990 Kuhn Road; Carol Stream, Illinois 60188; United States; 41°55′45″N 88°08′30″W

Information
- School type: Public high school
- Opened: 1968; 58 years ago
- School district: Glenbard Township HS Dist. 87
- Superintendent: David Larson
- NCES School ID: 171683001989
- Principal: John Mensik
- Teaching staff: 138.90 (on an FTE basis)
- Grades: 9–12
- Gender: Coed
- Enrollment: 2,143 (2023-2024)
- Student to teacher ratio: 15.43
- Campus type: suburban
- Colours: Black; Old Gold
- Fight song: Fighting Panthers of North
- Athletics conference: DuKane Conference
- Nickname: Panthers
- Newspaper: The North Current
- Yearbook: Aquilo
- Website: www.glenbardnorthhs.org

Glenbard North High School, or GBN, and locally referred to as "Glenbard" or "North", is a public closed campus four-year high school located at the corner of Kuhn Road and Lies Road in Carol Stream, Illinois, a western suburb of Chicago, Illinois, in the United States. It is part of Glenbard Township High School District 87, which also includes Glenbard South High School, Glenbard East High School, and Glenbard West High School. The North campus is the largest among the four high schools in Glenbard Township District 87, serving approximately 2,200 students from Carol Stream, Glendale Heights, Hanover Park, and Bloomingdale.

== History ==
Glenbard North opened its doors in August 1968. It was the third of the four Glenbard high schools to open. The first principal of Glenbard North was Raymond Livingston. Burt Weber served Glenbard North as principal from 1971 to 1989, having the longest tenure of any Glenbard North principal at 18 years. The football field, Weber Field, was named in his honor.

== Athletics ==
Glenbard North teams are called the Panthers. These athletic teams compete in the DuKane Conference. The school's teams also compete in state championship tournaments sponsored by the Illinois High School Association (IHSA).

The school sponsors interscholastic sports for men and women in basketball, cross country, gymnastics, golf, soccer, tennis, track & field, and volleyball. Men may also compete in baseball, football, and wrestling. Women may compete in badminton, cheerleading, swimming, and softball. While not sponsored by the IHSA, the school also sponsors a pom team for women, and a district-wide ice hockey team for men.

=== State championships ===
- Cross Country (Girls): 1994–95
- Gymnastics (Boys): 1991–92; 2008–09
- Gymnastics (Girls): 1981–82; 1982–83
- Wrestling: 2010–11;

== Notable alumni ==
- Rick Ackerman was an NFL defensive tackle (1982, 1984–87), playing most of his career for the San Diego Chargers.
- Billy Corgan is a musician and songwriter best known as the frontman for the Smashing Pumpkins.
- Ryan Diem was an offensive tackle for the NFL Indianapolis Colts (2001–2012). He was the starting right tackle for the Super Bowl XLI champions.
- Jim Ellison was the lead singer for late 1980s–early 1990s power pop trio Material Issue.
- Eric Orze is a Major League Baseball pitcher for the Minnesota Twins.
- Eric Petersen is an actor playing the titular character in the series Kevin Can F**k Himself.
- Michael Quigley is a United States Congressman, representing the 5th Congressional District of Illinois; a seat he won in a special election to replace Rahm Emanuel.
- Kiele Sanchez is an actress best known for her work on television (Lost, Related).
- Tony Ramos was an international freestyle wrestler and NCAA champion wrestler for Iowa.
- Justin Jackson is a running back for the NFL's Detroit Lions.
- Greg Newsome II is a defensive back for the NFL's Cleveland Browns.

== See also ==
- List of high schools in Illinois
