= Paul Darcy Boles =

American author (1916–1984)

Dust jacket photo, 1953

Paul Darcy Boles (March 5, 1916 – May 4, 1984) was an American author who also worked in radio, television and advertising. His more than 150 short stories appeared in many American and European periodicals, including Ladies Home Journal, McCall's, Saturday Evening Post, Seventeen, Playboy, and Cosmopolitan. Boles earned several honors for his novels and stories. After leaving business in 1970, he worked solely as an author. He also taught writing around the South.

== Career ==
Paul Boles was born on March 5, 1916, in Ashley, Indiana, of Irish parentage. "In the late 1800s my .. family owned a lot of Fort Wayne [Indiana]," he said on the dust jacket of his first novel. Boles attended grade school in northwest Indiana and high school in Glen Ellyn, Illinois, which is clearly recognizable in his book Glenport, Illinois. Some of his short stories display a gentle feeling for small town life. After "dropping out" of high school, he worked in the steel mills of Gary, Indiana for three years. He then joined the army. At some point, Boles attended Northwestern University, but was "kicked out [for] writ[ing] a satire on the Establishment" in the school humor magazine. He also traveled and worked in Europe before World War II.

His first novel, The Streak, is set in southern Europe, and his second one, The Beggars in the Sun, takes place in Mobile, Alabama, where Boles worked for a time. The rights to The Streak were subsequently sold to an unnamed Hollywood personality. His books were reviewed by The New York Times, the Chicago Tribune, The Atlanta Journal, and many other publications. Rex Lardner stated "he writes fine, exciting and often moving prose." It was said Boles' books are "stamped with the hallmark of integrity." He was sued for plagiarism by a person who had hired him to rework a novel they wrote, but Boles was cleared of the charges. He died on May 4, 1984, in Atlanta, Georgia, where he had lived since the 1950s.

Although they differ widely in subject matter and setting, Boles said of his books: "All deal in some way with the individual experiencing something, not against the world, but in spite of it."

== Awards and memberships ==
- "Freedom Foundation" citation, 1957, for Deadline, which addressed "the issues of integration and segregation." (Note: Most likely the Freedoms Foundation of Valley Forge, not one of the "Freedom Foundation"s.)
- Friends of American Writers Literature Award, 1959, for Parton's Island
- Indiana University Writers' Conference Award, 1969, for A Million Guitars and Other Stories
- Georgia Writers' Association Literary Achievement Award for fiction, 1969
- Dixie Council of Authors and Journalists award, for The Limner, 1975
- Authors Guild
- PEN

== Novels ==
- The Streak, Macmillan, 1953
- The Beggars in the Sun, Macmillan, 1954
- Glenport, Illinois, Macmillan, 1956
- Deadline, Macmillan, 1957
- Parton's Island, (self-illustrated), Macmillan, 1958
- The Limner, Crowell, 1975 (Book-of-the-Month Club alternate selection), published in England as Loving Letty, 1976, and as Der Wandermaler in German, 1975
- The Mississippi Run, Crowell, 1977 (Doubleday Book Club selection)
- Glory Day, Random House, 1979

== Short stories and collections ==
- A Million Guitars and Other Stories, Little, Brown, 1967
- I Thought You Were a Unicorn and Other Stories, Little, Brown, 1971
- Night Watch, Peachtree Publishers, 1980 (also a radio play for National Public Radio)

== Non-fiction ==
- (contributor) The Living Novel: a symposium, Granville Hicks, editor, Macmillan, 1957
- Storycrafting, Writer's Digest Books, Cincinnati, OH, 1984
