= Rick Ackerman =

American football player (born 1959)

No. 91, 97, 60
- Position: Defensive tackle

Personal information
- Born: June 16, 1959 (age 67); La Grange, Illinois, U.S.
- Listed height: 6 ft 4 in (1.93 m)
- Listed weight: 250 lb (113 kg)

Career information
- High school: Glenbard North (Carol Stream, Illinois)
- College: Memphis
- NFL draft: 1981: undrafted

Career history
- San Diego Chargers (1981–1984); Los Angeles Raiders (1984, 1987)

Career NFL statistics
- Sacks: 7.5
- Games: 42
- Fumble recoveries: 3
- Stats at Pro Football Reference

Richard Carl Ackerman (born June 16, 1959) is an American former professional football player who was a defensive tackle in the National Football League. He played college football for the Memphis Tigers before playing in the NFL for the San Diego Chargers and Los Angeles Raiders. He had a career total 18 starts, 14 with the San Diego Chargers.

Ackerman attended Glenbard North High School.
