= Stark Farm (Carol Stream, Illinois) =

Farmhouse in Illinois, United States

Coordinates: 41°55′53.2″N 88°7′42.5″W

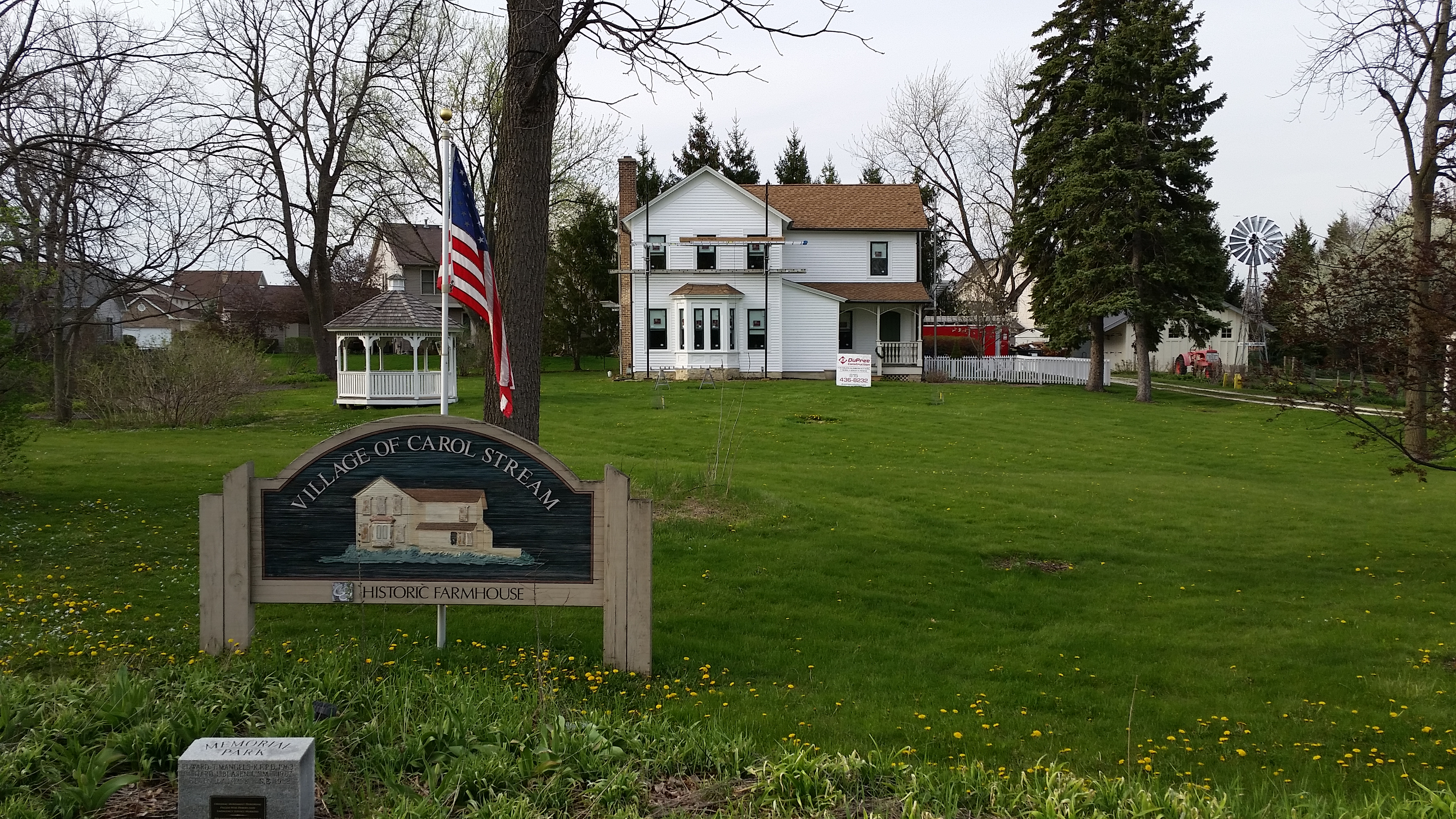
The Stark Farm

Stark Farm is an historic site in Carol Stream, Illinois. It is considered the oldest and last farm house in the area.

== History ==
William W. and Helen M. Ingraham originally homesteaded the property. In 1871, they sold the property for $2,200 to Joseph and Mary Stark, who built the farm house in 1874. The Stark family kept the house until the 1930s. In 1945, the Harting family bought the house. In 1993, the Village of Carol Stream became the owner.

The Stark farm house is an Italian style two-story gabled house built on a stone foundation. It has a basement and bay area on the south facing wall.

== Preservation ==
In 1996, the village hired architect Anne McGuire to create a preservation plan for the property. Currently, the house is the headquarters of the Carol Stream Historical Society. The society provides tours of the house. The Village recently installed new windows and siding to help make the house more energy efficient while trying to keep the look of the house as close to the original.
