= Squeezable Skylines =

Stuffed toy company

- Founder: Micheal Gordon (2013)
- Defunct: 2018
- Key people: Micheal Gordon; Glenn Robertson; Brent Robertson; Staurn Robertson
- Products: Stuffed toys
- Website: squeezableskyline.com

Squeezable Skylines was a stuffed toy company that was best known for selling stuffed toy towers of skyscrapers.

Based in Chicago, Squeezable Skylines was founded by four people, three of which were brothers. They all went to Glenbard West High School together, and later became friends.

- Micheal Gordon, the "leader" of the group and lead architect.
- Glenn Robertson, the lead operation.
- Brent Robertson, the sales operator.
- Staurn Robertson, the financial leader.

== History ==
A Kickstarter campaign for Squeezable Skylines was launched on April 8, 2014 and ended on May 8, 2014. The campaign was unsuccessful after not reaching $25,000. In spite of this, Squeezable Skylines still started selling their products. The designing of the stuffed towers collection started on July 18.

== Products ==
The company recreated 4 skyscrapers in plush form:

- Willis Tower
- John Hancock Center
- Empire State Building
- Space Needle
