= School District 15 =

School District 15 may refer to:

- Community Consolidated School District 15
- Marquardt School District 15
- Meridian Community Unit School District 15
- Tuba City Unified School District (TCUSD #15)
