= Bloomingdale, Illinois =

- Village
- Village of Bloomingdale
- Flag Seal

- Location of Bloomingdale in DuPage County, Illinois.
- Coordinates: 41°56′47″N 88°06′32″W
- Country: United States
- State: Illinois
- County: DuPage
- Township: Bloomingdale
- Settled: 1833
- Incorporated: 1889
- Re-incorporated: June 18, 1923
- Founder: Meacham Brothers (Lyman, Harvey and Silas)

Government
  - Type: Council–manager
  - President: Franco Coladipietro

Area
  - Total: 7.03 sq mi (18.20 km^{2})
  - Land: 6.76 sq mi (17.52 km^{2})
  - Water: 0.26 sq mi (0.68 km^{2}) 3.69%
- Elevation: 787 ft (240 m)

Population (2020)
  - Total: 22,382
  - Density: 3,308.1/sq mi (1,277.28/km^{2})
- Up 1.6% from 2000

Standard of living (2016-20)
  - Median household income: $87,397
  - Median home value: $306,400
- Time zone: UTC-6 (Central)
  - Summer (DST): UTC-5 (Central)
- ZIP code: 60108
- Area codes: 630 and 331
- FIPS code: 17-06587
- GNIS feature ID: 2398138

Bloomingdale is a village in DuPage County, Illinois, United States, settled in 1833, and 25 miles northwest of downtown Chicago. The population was 22,382 at the 2020 census.

== History ==
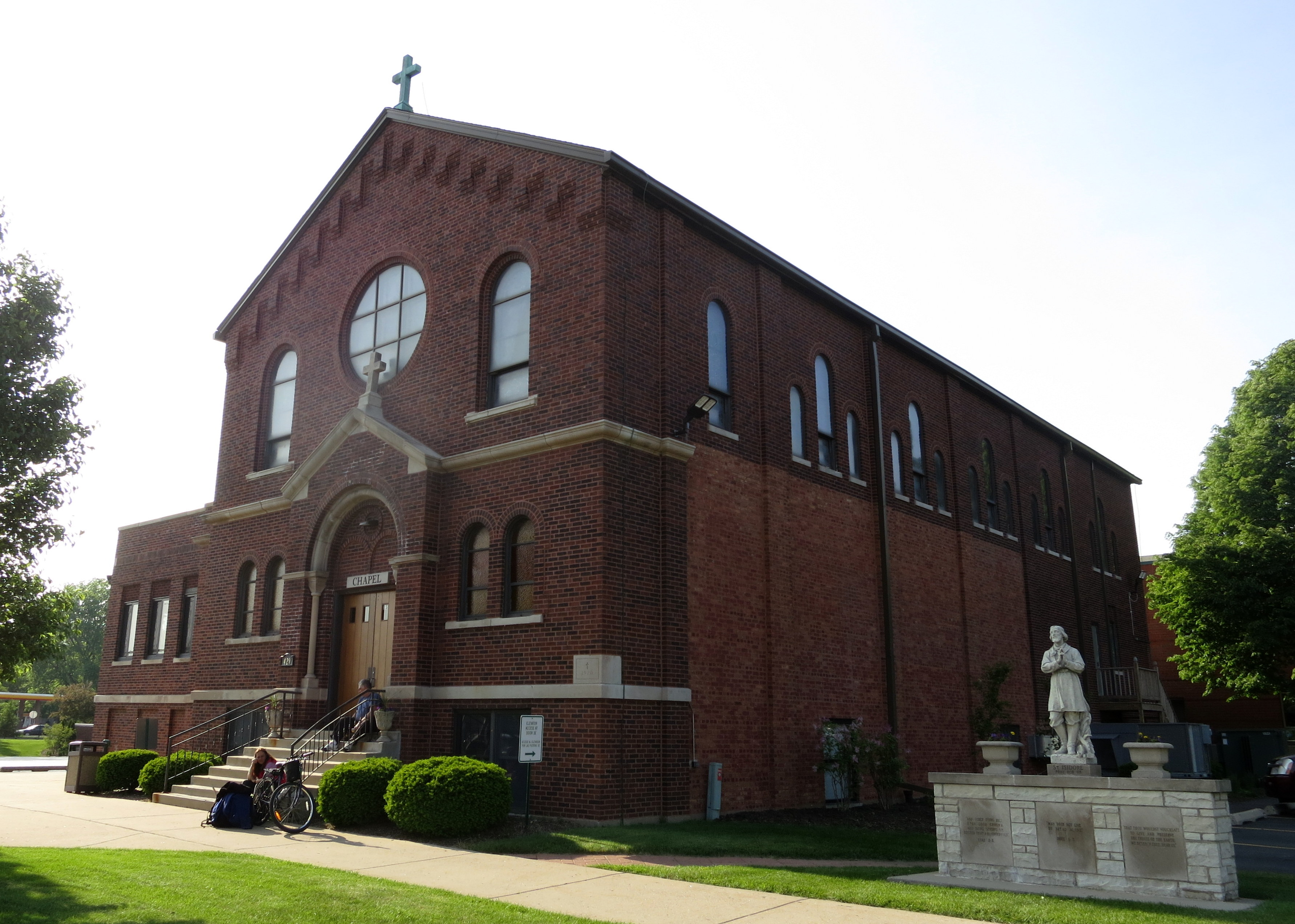
The chapel at St Isidore Catholic Church on West Army Trail Rd.

Bloomingdale is one of the earliest villages settled in what is now DuPage County. The Meacham family settled here in 1833, and by the end of the following year, 12 to 15 families had settled in the locality. It was originally named Meacham's Grove. The community was served by the Chicago-Galena Highway, modern day Lake Street. It became an important stop for stage coaches and westward travelers. Originally a Cook County settlement, it was annexed by DuPage County in 1839. The northern part of the village wanted to develop commercially while the southern part wished to remain a farming community. In 1923, the village split to accommodate this—the northern portion of the town was incorporated as Roselle. From 1950 to 1980, the population increased from 338 to 12,659.

The landmark U.S. Supreme Court case Illinois v. Gates began with an anonymous letter written to the Bloomingdale police department.

== Geography ==
Bloomingdale is located at 41°56′58″N 88°4′57″W (41.949540, -88.082564).

According to the 2021 census gazetteer files, Bloomingdale has a total area of 7.03 square miles (18.21 km^{2}), of which 6.77 square miles (17.53 km^{2}) (or 96.29%) is land and 0.26 square miles (0.67 km^{2}) (or 3.71%) is water.

=== Points of interest ===
Stratford Square Mall was the largest of Bloomingdale's shopping centers. The indoor mall contained two major department stores and 35 shops, plus 100 vacancies, as well as several restaurants with five vacant anchors (formerly six, yet one was demolished to make way for a Woodman's.) Also, Old Town Bloomingdale, at the intersection of Lake Street and Bloomingdale Road, is a collection of small businesses, restaurants and shops located in restored buildings at the original site of the village's first settlement.

== Demographics ==
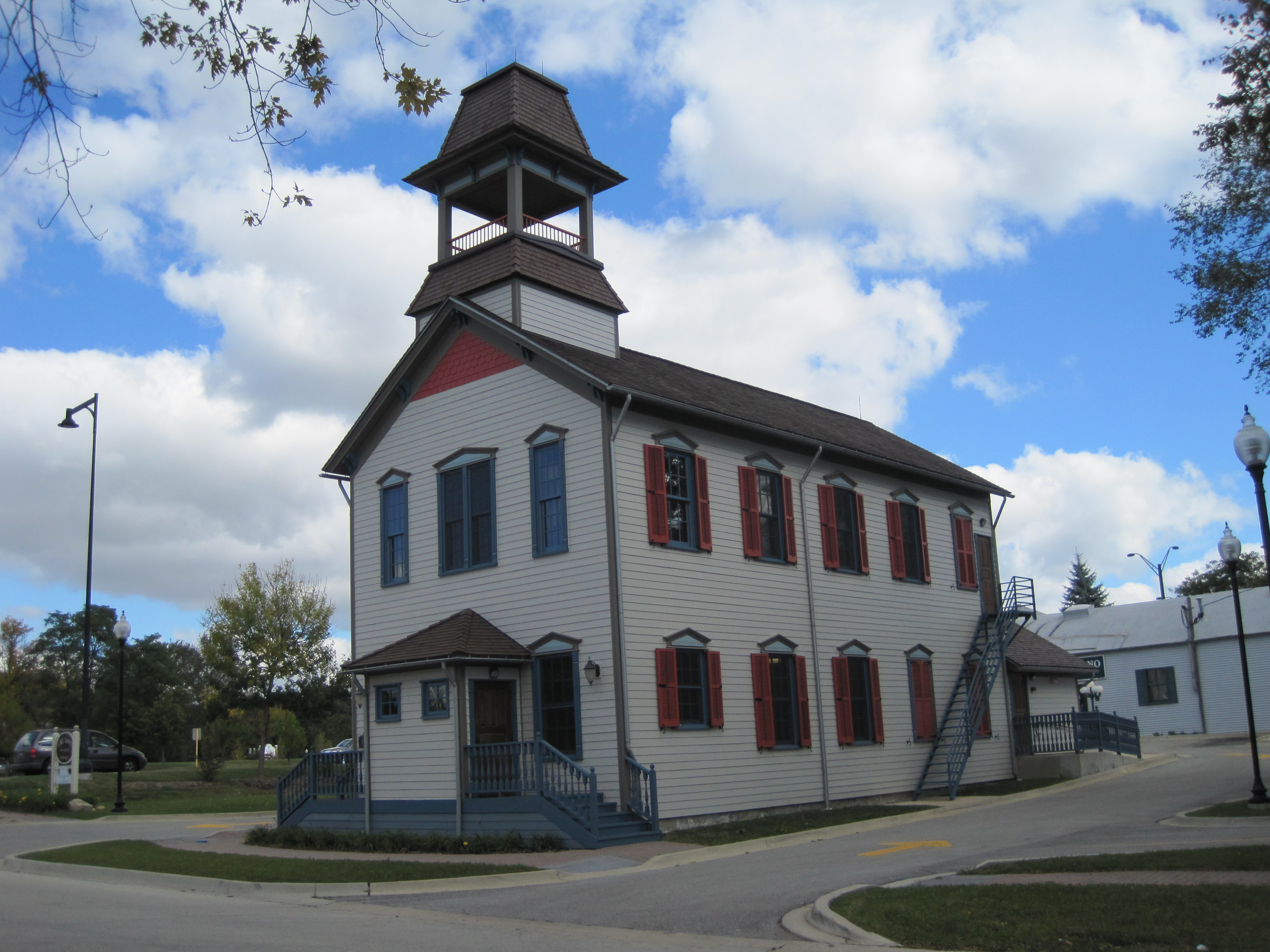
Bloomingdale Village Hall

Historical population
Census	Pop.	Note	%±
1880	226		—
1890	403		78.3%
1900	235		−41.7%
1910	462		96.6%
1920	448		−3.0%
1930	337		−24.8%
1940	305		−9.5%
1950	339		11.1%
1960	1,262		272.3%
1970	2,974		135.7%
1980	12,656		325.6%
1990	16,614		31.3%
2000	21,675		30.5%
2010	22,018		1.6%
2020	22,382		1.7%
U.S. Decennial Census

=== Racial and ethnic composition ===
Bloomingdale village, Illinois – Racial and ethnic composition Note: the US Census treats Hispanic/Latino as an ethnic category. This table excludes Latinos from the racial categories and assigns them to a separate category. Hispanics/Latinos may be of any race.
Race / Ethnicity (NH = Non-Hispanic)	Pop 2000	Pop 2010	Pop 2020	% 2000	% 2010	% 2020
White alone (NH)	17,584	16,216	14,747	82.37%	73.65%	65.89%
Black or African American alone (NH)	551	783	791	2.54%	3.56%	3.53%
Native American or Alaska Native alone (NH)	21	29	39	0.10%	0.13%	0.17%
Asian alone (NH)	1,906	2,770	3,392	8.79%	12.58%	15.16%
Pacific Islander alone (NH)	1	5	1	0.00%	0.02%	0.00%
Other race alone (NH)	17	21	61	0.08%	0.10%	0.27%
Mixed race or Multiracial (NH)	251	278	601	1.16%	1.26%	2.69%
Hispanic or Latino (any race)	1,074	1,916	2,750	4.96%	8.70%	12.29%
Total	21,675	22,018	22,382	100.00%	100.00%	100.00%

=== 2020 census ===
As of the 2020 census, Bloomingdale had a population of 22,382 and 5,503 families. The population density was 3,185.14 inhabitants per square mile (1,229.79/km^{2}). There were 9,301 housing units at an average density of 1,323.61 per square mile (511.05/km^{2}).

The median age was 45.2 years. 18.4% of residents were under the age of 18 and 22.8% were 65 years of age or older. For every 100 females there were 91.3 males, and for every 100 females age 18 and over there were 88.9 males.

100.0% of residents lived in urban areas, while 0.0% lived in rural areas.

There were 8,903 households, of which 25.9% had children under the age of 18 living in them. Of all households, 51.8% were married-couple households, 15.3% were households with a male householder and no spouse or partner present, and 27.5% were households with a female householder and no spouse or partner present. About 28.5% of all households were made up of individuals, and 14.3% had someone living alone who was 65 years of age or older. The average household size was 2.42 and the average family size was 3.12.

Of the village's housing units, 4.3% were vacant. The homeowner vacancy rate was 1.2% and the rental vacancy rate was 5.9%.

=== Income and poverty ===
The median income for a household in the village was $87,397, and the median income for a family was $107,250. Males had a median income of $62,115 versus $42,861 for females. The per capita income for the village was $47,926. About 3.3% of families and 6.9% of the population were below the poverty line, including 6.2% of those under age 18 and 5.8% of those age 65 or over.

== Education ==
Elementary school districts serving Bloomingdale include:

- Bloomingdale School District 13
- Community Consolidated School District 93
  - It is headquartered in Bloomingdale and operates two schools in Bloomingdale: Stratford Middle School and the Early Childhood Center.
- Keeneyville School District 20
- Marquardt School District 15
  - It operates Winnebago Elementary School in Bloomingdale.
- Medinah District 11

High school districts include:

- Glenbard Township High School District 87
  - Students in the section of Bloomingdale within District 87 are zoned to either Glenbard East High School in Lombard or Glenbard North High School in Carol Stream.
- Lake Park High School (District 108) in Roselle

Bloomingdale has one private school, St. Isidore School.

Nearby private schools:

- St. Francis High School in Wheaton
- St. Matthew School in Glendale Heights
- St. Walter Catholic School in Roselle
- Trinity Lutheran School in Roselle

The community is served by the 35,000-square-foot (3,300 m^{2}) Bloomingdale Public Library.

== Religious institutions ==
Religious institutions found within the village of Bloomingdale include:

- Bloomingdale Church
- Bloomingdale Community Church
- Church of the Incarnation (Episcopal)
- Church of Jesus Christ of Latter Day Saints
- Cornerstone Faith Community Church
- Mission Church
- Shree Radhey Shyam Temple
- St. Andrew's Ukrainian Orthodox Church
- St. Isidore's Roman Catholic Church
- World Mission Society Church of God

== Transportation ==
Pace provides bus service on Routes 711 and 715 connecting Bloomingdale to Wheaton and other destinations.

== Notable people ==
- Nate Fox, professional basketball player
- Frank C. Rathje, president of the American Bankers Association, founder of the Mutual National Bank of Chicago
