= Bloomingdale School District 13 =

School district in Illinois, United States

Address
- 164 Euclid Avenue Bloomingdale, Illinois, 60108; United States

District information
- Type: Public
- Grades: PreK–8
- NCES District ID: 1706450

Students and staff
- Students: 1,344

Other information
- Website: www.sd13.org

Bloomingdale School District 13 is an elementary school district headquartered in Bloomingdale, Illinois.

As of 2017 it has about 1,225 students. The district operates three schools: Westfield Middle School and two elementary schools: DuJardin Elementary School and Erickson Elementary School.

== Schools ==
DuJardin, named after children's literature author Rosamond Neal DuJardin, opened in 1964 on land formerly owned by its namesake's family. As of 2017 the school has 382 students.

Erickson, named after former district assistant superintendent William L. Erickson (died 1990), opened in 1993. As of 2017 it has 476 students. It is, as of that year, the newest school in the district.

Westfield opened in 1975, and as of 2017 it has 433 students and about 60 employees. Its name is a combination of the area subdivisions Fairfield and Westlake.
