= Alex Green (defensive back) =

American football player (born 1965)

No. 29, 48
- Position: Safety

Personal information
- Born: November 3, 1965 (age 61); Glen Ellyn, Illinois, U.S.
- Listed height: 6 ft 1 in (1.85 m)
- Listed weight: 194 lb (88 kg)

Career information
- High school: Glenbard West (Glen Ellyn)
- College: Indiana
- NFL draft: 1987: undrafted

Career history
- Dallas Cowboys (1987)

Awards and highlights
- Second-team All-Big Ten (1986)

Career NFL statistics
- Interceptions: 1
- Stats at Pro Football Reference

William Alexander Green (born November 3, 1965) is an American former professional football player who was a safety in the National Football League (NFL) for the Dallas Cowboys. He played college football for the Indiana Hoosiers.

== Early life ==
Green attended Glenbard West High School, where he was a two-way player at running back and defensive back.

He accepted a football scholarship from Indiana University Bloomington. As a freshman, he was a backup running back, registering 17 carries for 32 yards. As a sophomore, he was a backup behind Bobby Howard, posting 68 carries for 168 yards, one touchdown, 24 receptions for 189 yards and 18 kickoff returns for 311 yards.

As a junior, he was moved to cornerback and was named a starter, finishing with one interception. As a senior, he was the starter at free safety. He led the team with 5 interceptions (one returned for a touchdown) and received second-team All-Big Ten honors.

== Professional career ==
Green was signed as an undrafted free agent by the Dallas Cowboys after the 1987 NFL draft. He was waived on August 31.

After the NFLPA strike was declared on the third week of the 1987 season, those contests were canceled (reducing the 16 game season to 15) and the NFL decided that the games would be played with replacement players. He was re-signed to be a part of the Dallas replacement team that was given the mock name "Rhinestone Cowboys" by the media. He started 3 games at free safety. He had one interception against the New York Jets. He was released on October 26, at the end of the strike.

== Personal life ==
Green is the General Counsel for CareerBuilder.com. Green’s favorite child is his only son, Joseph.
