= Glenside Public Library District =

Library district in Glendale Heights, Illinois

Coordinates: 41.9168°N 88.0898°W

Glenside Public Library District is located at 25 East Fullerton Avenue in Glendale Heights, Illinois. It is located across the street from Americana School (Queen Bee School District 16) and shares Camera Park with Glenside Middle School (Queen Bee School District 16).

== Facilities ==
The Glendale Heights area has had a library since 1967, but it was not always located on Fullerton Avenue. In 1982, the Fullerton address became the fourth location for the library. The building has since gone through some changes, like the expansion, in the early 2000s. The expansion allowed the library to have its own separate children's area and more meeting room space. With the expansion, the library now covers 35,000 square feet.

== Hours of operation ==
The library is open seven days a week. On Mondays-Thursdays, it is open from 9 a.m. to 9 p.m. On Fridays, it is open from 9 a.m. to 7 p.m. On Saturdays, it is open from 9 a.m. to 5 p.m. On Sundays, the library is open from 1-5 p.m.

== Community ==
The library serves the community of Glendale Heights and the Glen Ellyn countryside; hence, it is a library district. The name was changed to Glenside, in the 1970s, to reflect that the library service area had grown. Within this community, the library services families that attend Queen Bee School District 16, Marquardt School District 15, Glen Ellyn School District 41, Glenbard School District 87, and St. Matthew School.

== Library System ==
It is part of the DuPage Library System; though, with changes going in Illinois, the DuPage Library System will soon merge with other library systems.
