= Ryan Diem =

American football player (born 1979)

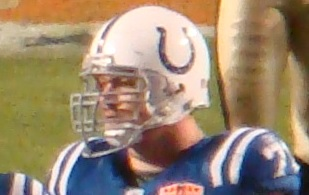
- Diem at Super Bowl XLIV

No. 71
- Position: Offensive tackle

Personal information
- Born: July 1, 1979 (age 47); Roselle, Illinois, U.S.
- Listed height: 6 ft 7 in (2.01 m)
- Listed weight: 320 lb (145 kg)

Career information
- High school: Glenbard North (Carol Stream, Illinois)
- College: Northern Illinois (1997–2000)
- NFL draft: 2001: 4th round, 118th overall pick

Career history
- Indianapolis Colts (2001–2011)

Awards and highlights
- Super Bowl champion (XLI); 2× First-team All-MAC (1999, 2000); Second-team All-MAC (1998)

Career NFL statistics
- Games played: 157
- Games started: 150
- Fumble recoveries: 1
- Stats at Pro Football Reference

Ryan Edwin Diem (born July 1, 1979) is an American former professional football player who spent his entire 11-year career as an offensive lineman for the Indianapolis Colts of the National Football League (NFL). He played college football for the Northern Illinois Huskies, and was selected by the Colts in the fourth round of the 2001 NFL draft. Diem played for the Colts from 2001 to 2011 and was part of the Super Bowl XLI championship team that beat the Chicago Bears.

== Early life and college ==
Born in Roselle, Illinois, Diem graduated from Glenbard North High School of nearby Carol Stream in 1997. Diem played defensive lineman in high school football and played on the high school track and field team. An all-state selection in track, Diem set state records in both indoor and outdoor shot put as a senior.

At Northern Illinois University, Diem played for the Huskies football team for four seasons from 1997 to 2000 and majored in mechanical engineering. As a freshman in 1997, Diem started seven games as right tackle. In his sophomore season of 1998, Diem returned as right tackle and earned second-team All-MAC honors. Diem earned first-team All-MAC honors in both 1999 and 2000, Honorable Mention Academic All-MAC in 1998, and Academic All-MAC honors in 1999.

== Professional career ==
Pre-draft measurables
Height	Weight	Arm length	Hand span	40-yard dash	10-yard split	20-yard split	20-yard shuttle	Three-cone drill	Vertical jump	Broad jump
6 ft 6 7/8 in (2.00 m)	338 lb (153 kg)	34 in (0.86 m)	10 in (0.25 m)	5.09 s	1.79 s	2.96 s	4.46 s	7.50 s	34 in (0.86 m)	8 ft 6 in (2.59 m)
All values from NFL Combine

Based on Diem's combine workout results alone, Pro Football Weekly predicted that Diem would be a first-round draft pick but considered him "an average athlete with limitations". Diem was drafted by the Indianapolis Colts in the fourth round of the 2001 NFL draft.

He played his entire career for the team, starting 150 of 158 games at offensive tackle and guard from 2001 to 2011. He was a member of the Colts Super Bowl XLI victory over the Chicago Bears. He retired on March 23, 2012.

== Personal life ==
Diem married Julie Constein, also from Carol Stream, Illinois, in 2003. They have three children and live in Zionsville, Indiana.

Diem is also a co-owner of Modern Muscle, Inc., in Oswego, Illinois. Modern Muscle specialized in performance automotive applications, and restorations.

Diem is a member of the board of directors of ClearObject (formerly CloudOne) – a Fishers, Indiana-based provider of Internet of Things solutions.
