= Medinah School District 11 =

School district in Illinois, United States

Address
- 700 East Granville Avenue Roselle, Illinois, 60172; United States

District information
- Type: Public
- Grades: PreK–8
- NCES District ID: 1725500

Students and staff
- Students: 665

Other information
- Website: www.medinah11.org

Medinah School District 11 is an elementary school district headquartered in Roselle, Illinois. In addition to portions of Roselle and Medinah, it also serves a very small portion of Bloomingdale.

It operates three schools: Medinah Primary School and Medinah Intermediate School in Medinah and Medinah Middle School in Roselle.
