= Community Consolidated School District 89 =

School district in Illinois, United States

Address
- 22W600 Butterfield Rd Glen Ellyn, Illinois, 60137; United States

District information
- Type: Public
- Grades: PreK–8
- NCES District ID: 1740500

Students and staff
- Students: 2,223

Other information
- Website: www.ccsd89.org

Community Consolidated School District 89 (CCSD 89) is an elementary school district headquartered in the CCSD89 Administration Center in Glen Ellyn, Illinois. In addition to Glen Ellyn, it also serves sections of Lombard and Wheaton.

Residents of this district are, for high school, assigned to Glenbard South High School of the Glenbard Township High School District 87.

== History ==
CCSD89 was formed in 1920 from the consolidation of School District 39 and School District 40. In 1925 the Bonaparte School left District 89. In 1949 District 89 absorbed York Center School District 49, and in 1952 the territory of District 39 was given to District 89 as District 39 had ceased to exist.

== Schools ==
The sole middle school is Glen Crest Middle School in Glen Ellyn.

Elementary schools:

- Arbor View Elementary School (Glen Ellyn)
- Briar Glen Elementary School (Wheaton)
- Park View Elementary School (Glen Ellyn)
- Westfield Elementary School (Glen Ellyn)

The CCSD89 preschool is at Arbor View Elementary.

== Glen Crest Middle School ==
Glen Crest Middle School is located in Glen Ellyn, IL and teaches sixth through eighth graders. The school was named Glen Crest Junior High School when it first opened in 1962 and was renamed to its current name, Glen Crest Middle School in 1997 The school is one of the main feeders into Glenbard South High School and is the only middle school in the Community Consolidated School District (CCSD) 89. Glen Crest Middle School is the feeder of four elementary schools: Park View, Briar Glen, Westfield, and Arbor View.

=== Athletics ===
Interscholastic sports for sixth, seventh, and eighth graders: cheerleading, cross country, and track and field.

Interscholastic sports for seventh and eighth graders: basketball and volleyball.

Glen Crest Middle School competes in the DuPage Metro Valley Association.

=== Information ===
Principal: Brett McPherson

District Superintendent: Dr. Emily Tammaru

Mascot: Spartans

Enrollment (2015): 625

Full-time teachers (2015): 48.11

Student to Teacher ratio (2015): 13:1

The student to teacher ratio has been decreasing since 2005 and is lower than the state average (14.9:1) and national average (16:1). However, the enrollment at the school has also been decreasing since 2005 where 833 students were enrolled.

=== Demographic (2017-2018) ===
View chart definition.

=== Report Card ===
Glen Crest Middle School students as a whole are more proficient in English and language arts (ELA), as well as mathematics, compared to the overall average of students in Illinois. However, the middle school is labeled an underperforming school because two of its student groups, black and IEP, are performing at or below the level of students in the lowest performing 5% of schools in Illinois.
