= Glenbard East High School =

Location
- 1014 S. Main St. Lombard, Illinois 60148; United States; 41.8662°N 88.0216°W

Information
- School type: Public Secondary
- Motto: Right Attitude Means Success (RAMS)
- Opened: 1959; 67 years ago
- School district: Glenbard District 87
- Superintendent: David Larson
- Principal: Antoine Anderson
- Teaching staff: 137.13 (on an FTE basis)
- Grades: 9–12
- Gender: Co-Ed
- Enrollment: 2,264 (2023–2024)
- Student to teacher ratio: 16.51
- Campus: Suburban
- Colours: red black white
- Fight song: Rams Fight
- Athletics conference: Upstate Eight Conference
- Nickname: Rams
- Publication: Ramblings
- Newspaper: The Echo
- Yearbook: Aries
- Website: www.glenbardeasths.org

Glenbard East High School, or GBE, is a public four-year high school located in Lombard, Illinois, a western suburb of Chicago, in the United States. It is part of Glenbard Township High School District 87. East, on average, draws around 2,500 students from Lombard, and portions of Glendale Heights, Addison, and Bloomingdale.

== History ==
Glenbard East High School opened in September 1959 with a student body of 525 students and 28 staff members. In the week prior to the school's opening, a tornado or microburst hit the school, causing significant damage. The east wall of the Tower section of the building was sucked out and fell through the roof of the then-unnamed auditorium. The classroom wing was unaffected, but the start of school was postponed for two weeks. When choosing team names during the first semester the school was open, the "Tornadoes" was one of three final choices; the other two were the "Apaches" and the winner, the "RAMS"—shown in caps as an acronym for Right Attitude Means Success. Given the school's location in "the Lilac Village", proposed school colors of lilac (purple, really) and white were not selected; instead the student body chose red, black and white. The first principal was William Rider.

Prior to the opening of Glenbard East in 1959, Lombard students in High School District No. 87 attended Glenbard West High School (then Glenbard High School) in Glen Ellyn. In Glenbard East's first year, school activities and sports were contained in the Glenbard West yearbook, the Pinnacle, in a special section. The first Glenbard East yearbook was the 1961 edition, and named the Aries. The yearbook staff, Aries, works year-round to produce the Glenbard East High School yearbook.

In its first few years, Glenbard East competed in the Interim Conference, comprising mostly newly built suburban schools. Other schools in the conference were Willowbrook High School in Villa Park, Niles West High School in Skokie, Morton West High School in Berwyn, among others.

The school celebrated its 50th anniversary in October 2009, with a display of memorabilia and special recognition to athletes of 50 years during a halftime celebration during a home football game October 2.

In 2011, The Washington Post named Glenbard East one of the top public high schools in Illinois.

== Male athletics ==
Glenbard East competes in the Upstate Eight Conference (UEC). Glenbard East is also a member of the Illinois High School Association (IHSA), which governs most interscholastic sports and competitive activities in Illinois. The teams are stylized as the Rams.

- Boys Track and Field State Champions (2010 4x800 Meter Relay) (Brad Magnetta, Jim Peters, Mike Fahey, Luke Chvatal)

== Female athletics ==
- Competitive Cheerleading:

State Finalists (2014–15 -10th) (2017–18 -9th)

== Notable alumni ==
- Jim Avila, also known as Jim Simon at GEHS, was a notable local (Chicago) and national reporter with ABC News later covering White House news and also on the 20/20 TV news program.
- Jeremy Hammond is an American activist and former convicted computer hacker.
- Joanna Krupa is a model and actress (Superstars, Dancing With The Stars).
- Marc Miller (class of 1965) is a game designer and science-fiction author.
- David Orr was the clerk of Cook County and was Interim Mayor of Chicago after the death of Harold Washington.
- Mary Doria Russell is an author, primarily known for her works of science fiction (The Sparrow, Children of God). At least one character from Dreamers of the Day is named in honor of a former teacher from Glenbard East.
- Dan Tani (class of 1979) is a NASA astronaut
- Derek Walker is a former American football player
- Timothy Zahn (class of 1969) is a Hugo Award–winning science fiction author, whose most famous works may be those set in the Star Wars expanded universe

== Notable staff ==
- D'Wayne Bates was a former NFL wide receiver for the Chicago Bears, and Minnesota Vikings. He was the Assistant Principal of Athletics (Athletic Director) at Glenbard East High School until 2025.
