= Derek Walker (gridiron football) =

American football player (born 1986)

No. 78, 95
- Position: Defensive end

Personal information
- Born: September 16, 1986 (age 40); Chester, Pennsylvania, U.S.
- Listed height: 6 ft 4 in (1.93 m)
- Listed weight: 268 lb (122 kg)

Career information
- High school: Lombard (IL) Glenbard East
- College: Illinois
- NFL draft: 2009: undrafted

Career history
- Washington Redskins (2009)*; Seattle Seahawks (2009); San Francisco 49ers (2009); Hartford Colonials (2010); Seattle Seahawks (2010)*; Virginia Destroyers (2011); Chicago Bears (2012)*; Chicago Rush (2012–2013); Orlando Predators (2014)*; Saskatchewan Roughriders (2014–2015)
- * Offseason or practice squad member only

Awards and highlights
- Freshman All-American (2005); 2× Second-team All-Big Ten (2006, 2008)

Career AFL statistics
- Total tackles: 12
- Sacks: 2
- Fumble recoveries: 1
- Interceptions: 1
- Stats at ArenaFan.com
- Stats at Pro Football Reference

Derek Raynal Walker (born September 16, 1986) is an American former professional football defensive end. He was signed by the Washington Redskins as an undrafted free agent in 2009. He played college football at Illinois.

Walker was also a member of the Seattle Seahawks, San Francisco 49ers, Hartford Colonials, Virginia Destroyers, Chicago Bears, Chicago Rush, Orlando Predators and Saskatchewan Roughriders.

== Early life ==
Walker attended Glenbard East High School in Lombard, Illinois, where he was honorable mention All-State. He was named the team's Most Valuable Player in football, track and basketball, adding All-Conference gridiron honors as a senior. He was chosen to the All-Area football and basketball squad by the Arlington Heights Daily Herald. He recorded 125 tackles, 11 sacks, 30 hurries, two forced fumbles and deflected two passes as a senior, garnering Super Prep and Prep Star All-Region accolades. In track, he was a two-time All-Conference selection in the discus and was named to the All-Conference team in basketball.

== College career ==
Walker was a Second-team All-Big Ten Conference selection by The NFL Draft Report and Athlon Sports Magazine. Walker started 11-of-12 games for the Illini, seeing action at both defensive end positions and also competed at right defensive tackle (lined up mostly at left end) and recorded 33 tackles (19 solos), six sacks, seven stops for losses and credited with nine quarterback pressures. He also recovered two fumbles and blocked a field goal and returned an interception 34 yards for a touchdown. In 2007 Walker played in twelve games, starting the first eight contests at left defensive end before suffering a left ankle sprain. He returned for the final four games, but was relegated to reserve duty, as his injury was slow to heal. He finished with 22 tackles (12 solos), 2.5 sacks, 3.5 stops for losses and nine quarterback pressures, a Recovered fumble and deflected two passes. The previous season, 2006, he was a Second-team All-Big Ten Conference selection by The NFL Draft Report. He was named team Defensive Lineman of the Year started all twelve games at left defensive end and recorded a career-high 29 tackles (12 solos) with 5.5 sacks, eight stops for losses and 12 quarterback pressures and two deflected passes. Walker was a Freshman All-American selection by The Sporting News As a freshman starter Walker made 26 tackles (15 solos) with a sack, six stops for losses and three quarter-back pressures a deflected pass. The 2004 season he red-shirted in his first year at Illinois, joining the program as a 245-pound defensive end.

== Professional career ==
=== Pre-Draft ===
Pre-draft measurables
Height	Weight	Arm length	Hand span	40-yard dash	20-yard shuttle	Three-cone drill	Vertical jump	Broad jump	Bench press
6 ft 3 3/4 in (1.92 m)	268 lb (122 kg)	34 1/4 in (0.87 m)	10 in (0.25 m)	4.98 s	4.41 s	7.31 s	37 1/2 in (0.95 m)	9 ft 7 in (2.92 m)	24 reps
All values from NFL Combine.

=== Washington Redskins ===
Walker was signed by the Washington Redskins as an undrafted free agent in 2009. He was cut by Washington in July.

=== Seattle Seahawks ===
Walker then signed as a free agent with the Seahawks on July 29, 2009. He was waived after one game on September 14. He was re-signed to the practice squad the next day. The Seahawks promoted Walker to the active roster on November 10, but he did not appear in a game with the team before being waived on December 26 to make room for wide receiver Mike Hass.

=== San Francisco 49ers ===
Walker was claimed off waivers by the San Francisco 49ers on December 28.

=== Chicago Bears ===
Walker was signed as a free agent by the Chicago Bears on August 7. On August 25, the Bears waived Walker.
