= Jim Avila =

American television journalist (1955–2025)

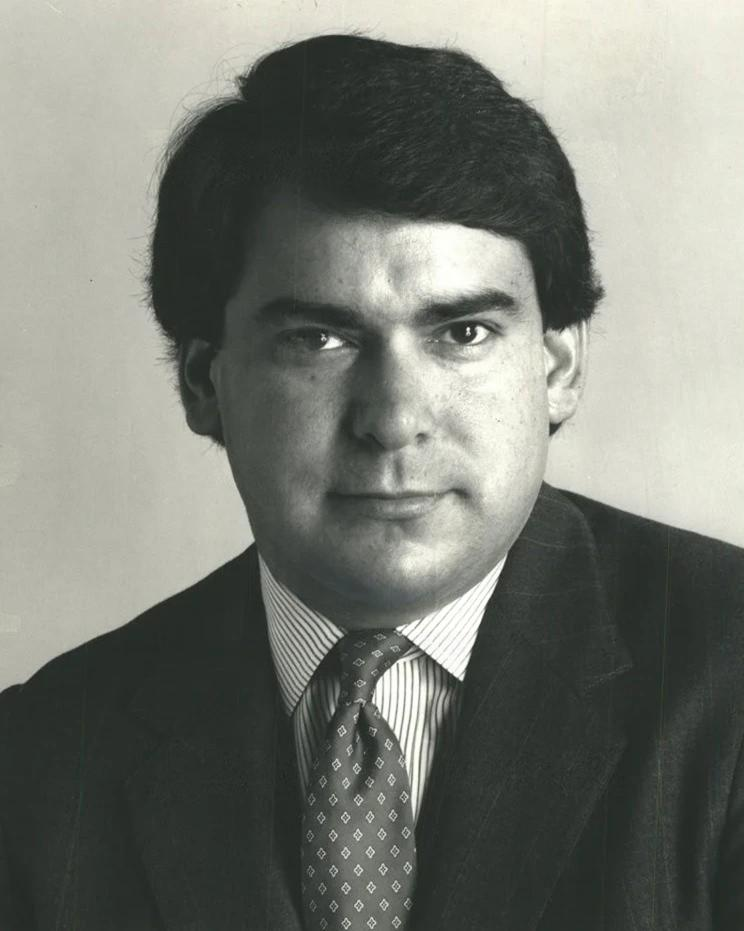
- Avila in 1986
- Born: James Joseph Simon; July 26, 1955; Los Angeles, California, U.S.
- Died: November 12, 2025 (aged 70); San Diego, California, U.S.
- Occupations: Television journalist, news correspondent
- Years active: 1973–2025
- Children: 3

James Joseph Simon (July 26, 1955 – November 12, 2025), known professionally as Jim Avila, was an American television journalist who worked as the Senior Law and Justice Correspondent for ABC News. He worked at various stations throughout his career and won several awards for his efforts in investigative reporting.

== Early life ==
Avila was born James Joseph Simon in Los Angeles on July 26, 1955, to James and Eva (née Avila) Simon, and grew up in the Chicago suburb of Lombard, Illinois, where he graduated from Glenbard East High School. His father also worked in broadcasting, as a host and executive in talk radio. Avila used his mother's maiden name during his career to pay tribute to his Mexican ancestry.

== Career ==
Avila's career began in 1973 as a reporter for the San Francisco station KCBS (AM). He would then spend time working at KPIX-TV before moving to Chicago in 1980. In Chicago, he worked at WLS-TV and WBBM-TV where he began his work as an anchor.

From 1994 to 1996, Avila was the investigative reporter for local NBC station KNBC in Los Angeles, where he covered the murder trial of O. J. Simpson. The station won the 1995 Golden Mike Award and a 1996 Emmy Award for that trial coverage. He joined NBC News in 2000 where he worked for four years. While working on NBC Nightly News, Avila averaged 130 reports annually.

Avila joined ABC in 2004, where he primarily covered court cases as a Senior Law and Justice Correspondent. He frequently anchored ABC's World News Saturday. Avila would later go on to cover Barack Obama's second term as president. In 2016 Avila moved to Los Angeles, a decision he stated he would later regret after Donald Trump was elected U.S. president. He served as the resident LA correspondent for the show 20/20 during his years with the network.

In 2012, ABC published a series of reports discussing the safety of Beef Products Inc. beef products. In these reports Avila frequently referred to the trimmings used as "pink slime". This led to a defamation lawsuit against ABC that was settled for around $177 million.

Avila retired from ABC News in 2021, but came out of retirement in 2023 to join KGTV, ABC's San Diego affiliate, where he was a part-time investigative reporter.

== Personal life and death ==
Avila had three children. He had a kidney transplant in 2018; his brother Jaie was the donor.

Avila died after a long illness at his home in San Diego on November 12, 2025, at the age of 70.

== Awards ==
Avila received various awards throughout his career. He won two national Emmy awards, for his work on the O. J. Simpson trial and the 1997 Red River flood. In 1999 he received the Reporter of the Year award from the National Association of Hispanic Journalists. He also obtained a Cine Golden Eagle Award and five Edward R. Murrow Awards.
