= Community Consolidated School District 93 =

School district in Illinois, United States

Address
- 230 Covington Drive Bloomingdale, Illinois, Dupage County, 60108; USA

District information
- Motto: CCSD93 strives to maximize the academic, social, and emotional potential of each student.
- Superintendent: David Hill, Ed.D.
- Chair of the board: Jessica Zolmierski

Students and staff
- Students: 3264
- Teachers: 318

Other information
- Website: https://www.ccsd93.com/

Community Consolidated School District 93 (Abbreviation: CCSD93) is an elementary school district headquartered in Bloomingdale, Illinois. It serves portions of Bloomingdale, Carol Stream, and Hanover Park. The district has nine schools. As of 2024 student enrollment is 3,264 students.

== Schools ==
As of 2017 each elementary school has a range of 223 through 467 students while each middle school has less than 600 students.

Middle schools:

- Jay Stream Middle School - Carol Stream
  - Prior to the 1999–2000 school year, Jay Stream served grades 5–6, and due to changes in school attendance boundaries, housed some students in the 4th grade during the 1994–1995 school year. It became a grade 5-7 school in 1999–2000, and a 6-8 school in 2000–2001.
- Stratford Middle School - Bloomingdale
  - Prior to the 1999–2000 school year, Stratord grades 7–8. It became a grade 5-8 school in 1999–2000, with the 5th grade eliminated in 2000–2001.

All elementary schools served grades Kindergarten through 4 until the 1999–2000 school year, when some began serving the fifth grade. In 2000-2001 all elementary schools served K-5.

Elementary schools:

- Carol Stream Elementary School - Carol Stream
  - Began serving the 5th grade in the 1999–2000 school year.
- Cloverdale Elementary School - Carol Stream
- Roy DeShane Elementary School - Carol Stream
  - Began serving the 5th grade in the 1999–2000 school year.
- Heritage Lakes Elementary School - Carol Stream
  - The school was the fifth elementary school built in the district, opening in 1990.
- Elsie C. Johnson Elementary School - Hanover Park
- Western Trails Elementary School - Carol Stream

The sole preschool is the Early Childhood Center (ECC) in Bloomingdale. The district began serving preschool in fall 2001; initially preschool classes were held in Cloverdale Elementary School and DeShane Elementary School. The dedicated preschool building opened in fall 2013.
