= Hearthside Food Solutions =

American food manufacturing company

Hearthside Food Solutions LLC
- Founded: 2009
- Founder: Rich Scalise
- Headquarters: Downers Grove, Illinois, United States
- Key people: Darlene Nicosia Chief Executive Officer; Rich Scalise Chairman and Founder
- Products: contract manufacturing, including bars, baked goods, fresh and frozen entrees, and food packaging
- Owners: Charlesbank Capital Partners and Partners Group
- Website: www.hearthsidefoods.com

Hearthside Food Solutions, LLC is an American manufacturer of food products which has been implicated in workplace safety violations and the use of immigrant child labor.

On May 28, 2013, Post Holdings purchased the branded and private label cereal, granola and snacks business of Hearthside Food Solutions, which included the Golden Temple, Peace Cereal, Sweet Home Farm and Willamette Valley Granola Company brands, originally Yogi Bhajan's Sikh Dharma International's Golden Temple of Oregon's cereal division. Post combined this business with Attune Foods.

In 2014, Hearthside was acquired by Goldman Sachs Group and Vestar Capital Partners. In 2018, Goldman Sachs sold its interest in Hearthside to Charlesbank Capital Partners and Partners Group.

In 2021, Hearthside acquired from Weston Foods, a unit of George Weston Limited, six North American locations that produce cookies, crackers, cones, wafers and related baked products.

In 2024, Hearthside filed for Chapter 11 bankruptcy protection after being a part of a child labor scandal in 2023. The company claimed that the reasons for the bankruptcy were not connected to the scandal. See IHeart.com. The company has reached a deal with its lenders to shed almost $2 billion worth of debt.
