= Lake Ellyn Park =

- U.S. National Register of Historic Places
- U.S. Historic district
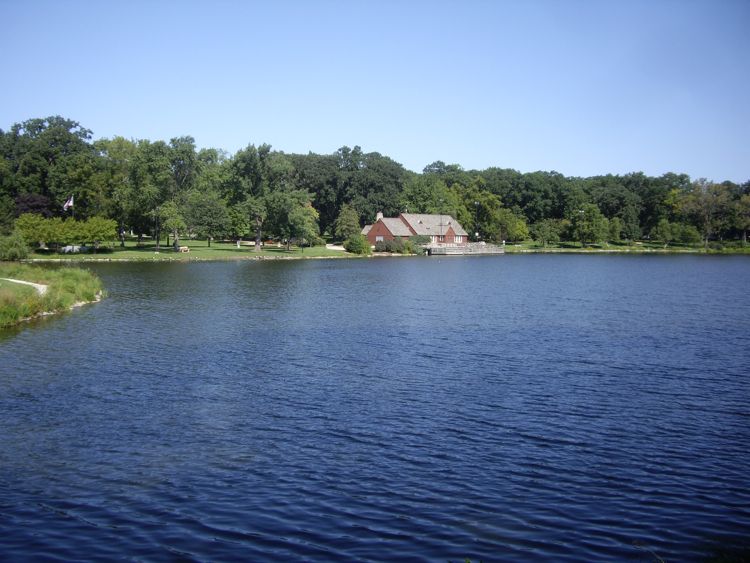

- Location within Illinois Location within the United States
- Location: 645 Lenox Rd., Glen Ellyn, Illinois
- Coordinates: 41°52′58″N 88°03′38″W
- Built: 1889; 137 years ago
- NRHP reference No.: 100000628
- Added to NRHP: February 7, 2017

Lake Ellyn Park is a 28.7-acre (11.6 ha) public park located at 645 Lenox Road in Glen Ellyn, Illinois. The park is centered around Lake Ellyn, an artificial lake created for the Hotel Glen Ellyn in 1889. The hotel burned down in 1906, and Glen Ellyn citizens proposed turning the land into a public park; however, as Glen Ellyn did not have a park district, it lacked the legal authority to buy the land. The city's residents voted to create a park district in 1919, and the new district bought the land and added park facilities in the early 1920s.

The park's main building is the Lake Ellyn Recreation House, which was built in 1937. Designed by Frederick G. Walker and built with the help of the Works Progress Administration, the building features a large recreation space with a fireplace and views of the lake. In 1968, the landscaped Ruth Candy Parkway and the Perry Nature Preserve were added to the park; both were preexisting Park District properties that bordered the park.

The park was added to the National Register of Historic Places on February 7, 2017.
