= The Girl Who Owned a City =

1975 novel

- First draw cover, art by Boris Vallejo
- Author: O.T. Nelson
- Illustrator: L'Enc Matte
- Cover artist: Boris Vallejo
- Language: English
- Genre: Post-apocalyptic, juvenile, science fiction
- Published: 1975 (Lerner Publishing Group)
- Publication place: United States
- Media type: Print (hardcover)
- Pages: 181 pp
- ISBN: 0-8225-0756-0

The Girl Who Owned a City is the only published novel by O. T. Nelson, first published in 1975. This book, sometimes taught in schools, is considered to be best suited for those between the ages of 12 and 15. A graphic novel adaptation by Dan Jolley with art by Joëlle Jones and Jenn Manley Lee was published in 2012.

== Plot ==
A deadly virus has swept the world, killing off everyone over the age of twelve in the span of a month or so. In the town of Glen Ellyn, Illinois, outside of Chicago, ten-year-old Lisa Nelson and her younger brother Todd Nelson are surviving, like all the children in the story, by looting abandoned houses and shops. Although there are abandoned cars in every driveway and lining every street, Lisa is the first child to think of driving one. She is also the first to think of raiding a farm, and the first to look at the dwindling supplies in stores and deduce that groceries come from warehouses. She finds a supermarket warehouse and raids it, enlisting the help of Craig Bergman, a neighbor boy two years older than her, but makes clear to him and all the other children in her neighborhood that the entire warehouse and all its contents are her exclusive property, not to be shared unless she chooses: she assures them all that she will burn the warehouse and everything in it rather than be forced to share against her will.

She considers relocating to the farm, but decides against it because it is difficult to defend (other children are starting to form gangs) and because "planning and getting the world back to the way it was, with schools, and hospitals, and electricity" are much more "exciting" than "hiding away on a farm ... digging in the dirt all day".

Lisa and her friends are approached by the "Chidester Gang", led by Tom Logan. Suspecting that Lisa has a source of supplies, Logan offers a food-for-protection deal, which Lisa declines. Unhesitatingly taking charge, she forms her block-long stretch of Grand Avenue into a militia, armed with guns, Molotov cocktails, and primitive weapons. When the militia proves unsuccessful at defending the "Land of Grandville" against "the fearful and cruel army of Chidester and Elm", and Lisa's house is lost, Lisa comes up with the idea of moving the "child-families"—and the entire contents of the warehouse—into the local high school, and transforming it into a fortress-city. Within the city, Lisa is the only authority, by virtue of the fact that she saw the abandoned high school and thought of moving there: this has earned her sole title to the "City of Glenbard" and everything in it.

A year after completion, things proceed according to plan until Logan and his gang manage to stage a successful attack on Glenbard, during which Lisa is shot in the arm. Todd and Lisa's friend Jill rescue her, and Jill performs basic surgery to remove the bullet from her arm, dosing her with whiskey for pain relief. When Lisa recovers, they retake the city from Logan, who has meanwhile learned that conqueror and leader are two very different things. Glenbard's "citizens" have refused to work for Logan. When they learn Lisa is still alive, they leave the "city" in droves, to join her on the farm. Lisa makes several plans to recapture the city, but ultimately regains it by lecturing Logan into relinquishing control back to her.

The book ends with a foreshadowing that the citizens of Glenbard will at some time be forced to face far larger armies, led by now extremely powerful dictators, tyrants and warlords. If any semblance of a free society is to exist in the new world, the citizens of Glenbard must make themselves capable of protecting and growing it by gaining in knowledge, power, and organization, and at the same time continuing to incorporate leadership and respect for the individual person into their society.

== Real-life connections ==
The book includes several elements related to the author's real life.

- The two main characters are named for the author's children, Todd and Lisa Nelson.
- The story takes place in the Chicago suburb of Glen Ellyn, Illinois where Lisa and Todd Nelson lived at the time the book was written.

== See also ==
- Empty World (1977), a United Kingdom post-apocalyptic novel by John Christopher where a plague kills off all the adults.
- The Tribe (1999 TV series), a New Zealand post-apocalyptic television series where the adult population has been wiped out by a deadly virus and the kids become warring tribes.
- Jeremiah (TV series), a United States-Canada post-apocalyptic television series where the adult population has been wiped out by a deadly virus.
- Gone (novel series) (2008), a United States post-apocalyptic novel series by Michael Grant where anyone over the age of 15 disappear mysteriously.
- The Sparticle Mystery (2011), a United Kingdom post-apocalyptic television series detailing an experiment that made anyone over the age of 15 disappear mysteriously.
- Between (TV series) (2015), a Canadian post-apocalyptic television series detailing a pandemic which killed off anyone over the age of 21.
- The Society (TV series) (2019), a United States post-apocalyptic television series where only a group of teenagers remain after their entire town disappear mysteriously.
