= Freedom Foundation =

Freedom Foundation may refer to:

- Freedom Foundation of Minnesota
- Freedom Foundation (Washington) located in Olympia, Washington, formerly known as the Evergreen Freedom Foundation
- Freedoms Foundation located in Valley Forge, Pennsylvania
