= Marquardt School District 15 =

School district in Illinois, United States

Address
- 1860 Glen Ellyn Road Glendale Heights, Illinois, 60139; United States

District information
- Type: Public
- Grades: PreK–8
- NCES District ID: 1724780

Students and staff
- Students: 2,499

Other information
- Website: www.d15.us

Marquardt School District 15 is an elementary school district headquartered in Glendale Heights, Illinois. It serves sections of Glendale Heights, Addison, Bloomingdale, Glen Ellyn, and Lombard. As of 2017 it had 2,700 students.

== Schools ==
Its sole middle school is Marquardt Middle School in Glendale Heights.

Elementary schools:

- Black Hawk Elementary School (Glendale Heights)
- G. Stanley Hall Elementary School (Glendale Heights)
- Charles G. Reskin Elementary School (Glendale Heights)
- Winnebago Elementary School (Bloomingdale)
