= Glenbard South High School =

Public school in Glen Ellyn, Illinois, US

Location
- 23W200 Butterfield Road; Glen Ellyn, Illinois 60137; United States; 41°49′56″N 88°04′12″W

Information
- School type: Public, secondary
- Opened: 1972; 54 years ago
- School district: Glenbard Twp. HS 87
- NCES District ID: 1716830
- Superintendent: David Larson
- NCES School ID: 171683001990
- Principal: Jessica Santee
- Teaching staff: 66.75 (FTE)
- Grades: 9-12
- Gender: Coed
- Enrollment: 1,027 (2023-2024)
- Student to teacher ratio: 15.39
- Campus size: 43 acres (0.17 km^{2})
- Campus type: Suburban
- Colors: red white royal blue
- Athletics conference: Upstate Eight Conference
- Mascot: Arty
- Nickname: Raiders
- Publication: Southwinds
- Newspaper: The Independent
- Yearbook: Dorian
- Website: www.glenbardsouthhs.org

Glenbard South High School (GSHS) is a public four-year high school located in Glen Ellyn, Illinois, United States. It is part of Glenbard Township High School District 87, and is the smallest of the four Glenbard Township High Schools. It contains students within the boundary of Community Consolidated School District 89.

== History ==
Glenbard South was the fourth of the Glenbard high schools built. It opened in 1972. The capacity of the building is 1500, but with additions, could actually house 2500 students.

== Academics ==
In 2021, Glenbard South had an average composite SAT score of 1054.5, and graduated 95.1% of its senior class.

Glenbard South has made Adequate Yearly Progress on the Prairie State Achievement Examination, a state test part of the No Child Left Behind Act.

The staff includes approximately 112 teachers, of whom 91.5% hold an advanced degree.

== Athletics ==
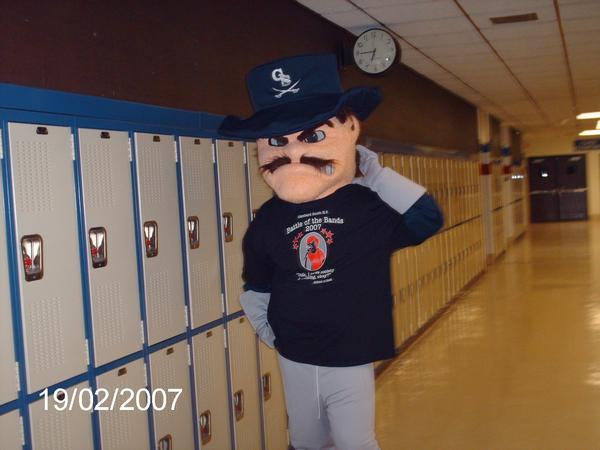
Arty the Raider (school mascot)

Glenbard South was a charter member of the Western Sun Conference, but when that conference dissolved in 2010, GSHS became an independent school. Glenbard South joined the Metro Suburban Conference for the 2011–12 school year, but left the conference to join the Upstate Eight Conference in 2018.

The boys' cross-country team won the Class AA Illinois state championship in 2001–02.

In 2012 and 2013, the girls' softball team won state.

In 2007, the boys' track and field 4X800m relay team won the Nike Outdoor Nationals competition with a time of 7:40.57.

== Activities ==
- The Math Team took first place in the state of Illinois among schools with 1,000 to 1,999 students in 2006.
- The Mock Trial team won state at the ISBA High School Mock Trial Invitational in 1985, 1986, 1992, 1993, and 1997.
- The Glenbard South Symphonic Band won the 2007 Illinois Superstate Concert Band Festival in the Class AA Division. The previous time the band won was in 1992.
- In 2010, the Glenbard South Chess Team finished high enough at the IHSA State Chess Tournament to win the Illinois Chess Coaches Association's State Championship in the 3A division.

== Notable alumni ==
- Greg Bloedorn (1991), former NFL long snapper for the Seattle Seahawks
- Tim Costo (1987), former Major League Baseball player (1992–93), playing his entire career for the Cincinnati Reds
- Jason Karnuth (1994), former Major League Baseball relief pitcher
- Ryan McPartlin (1993), actor primarily known for his work on television (Captain Awesome on Chuck)
- Lamorne Morris (2001), actor, New Girl
- Eboo Patel, former member of the Obama Administration's Faith Advisory Council and founder; current executive director of the Interfaith Youth Core
- Qasim Rashid, author of The Wrong Kind of Muslim
- Carter Reum, author, entrepreneur, and venture capitalist; married to socialite Paris Hilton
- Courtney Reum, author, entrepreneur, and venture capitalist; co-founder of the investment firm M13 with his brother Carter Reum
- Nikos Tselios (1997), former NHL defenseman for the Carolina Hurricanes (2001–02)
- Luke Nosek, Co-founder of PayPal, co-founder of The Founders Fund, Billionaire
