= Carol Stream, Illinois =

Village in the United States

- Village
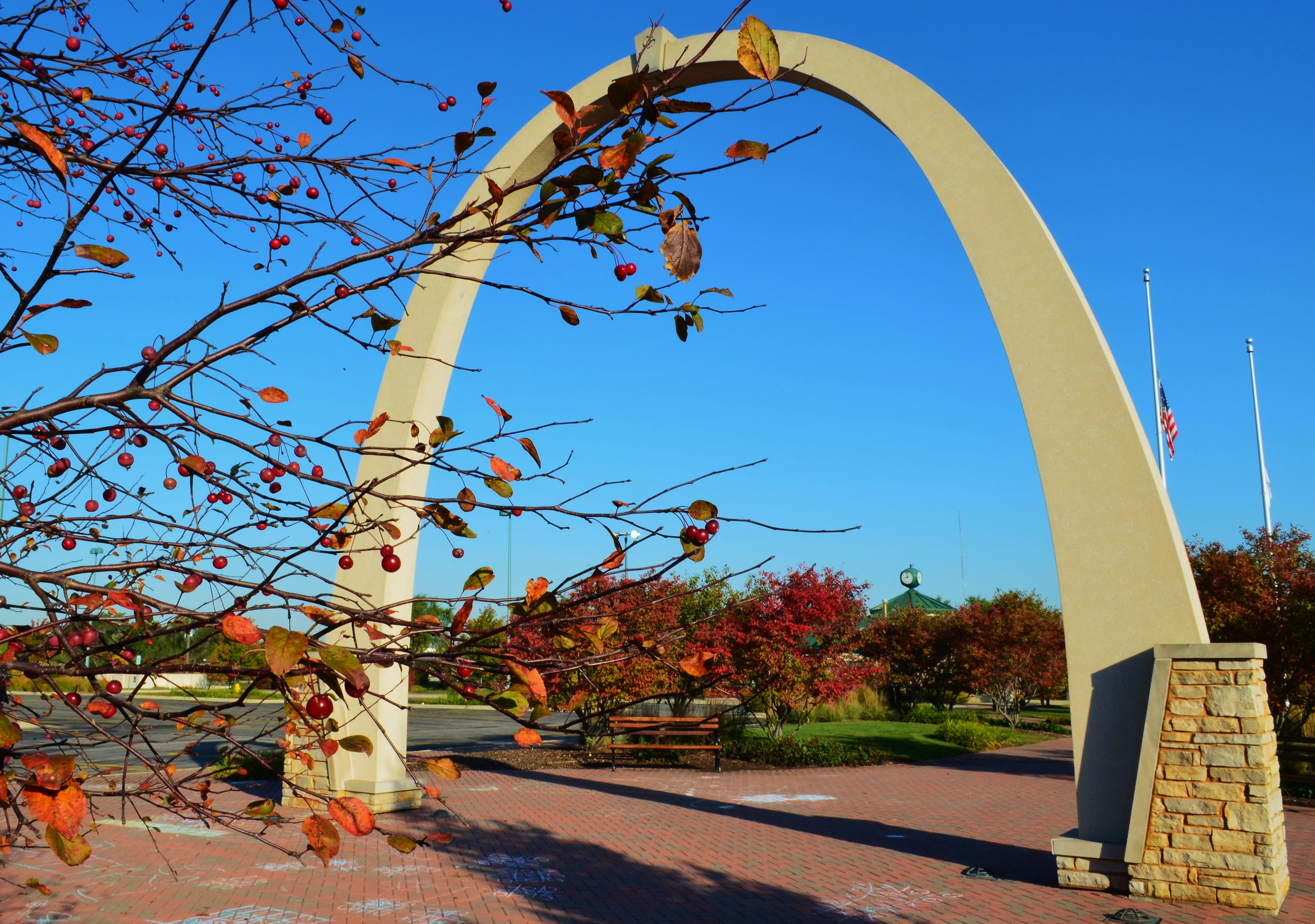
- Veterans Memorial
- Motto: "A great place to live and work"
- Location of Carol Stream in DuPage County, Illinois
- Coordinates: 41°54′49″N 88°07′27″W
- Country: United States
- State: Illinois
- County: DuPage
- Townships: Bloomingdale, Milton, Wayne
- Incorporated: 1959

Government
  - Type: Council–manager

Area
  - Total: 9.44 sq mi (24.44 km^{2})
  - Land: 9.12 sq mi (23.62 km^{2})
  - Water: 0.32 sq mi (0.82 km^{2}) 3.50%
- Elevation: 748 ft (228 m)

Population (2020)
  - Total: 39,854
  - Density: 4,369.9/sq mi (1,687.23/km^{2})
- Up 27.50% from 1990

Standard of living
  - Per capita income: $25,152 (median: $64,893)
  - Home value: $177,485 (median: $170,400 (2000))
- Time zone: UTC−6 (CST)
  - Summer (DST): UTC−5 (CDT)
- ZIP Codes: 60116, 60122, 60128, 60132, 60188, 60197, 60199
- Area code(s): 630, 331
- FIPS code: 17-11332
- GNIS feature ID: 2397559
- Website: www.carolstream.org

Carol Stream is a village in DuPage County, Illinois, United States, and a suburb of Chicago. It was incorporated on January 5, 1959, and named after the daughter of its founder, Jay Stream. Per the 2020 census, the population was 39,854.

== History ==
In 1853, St. John Wahlund Catholic Church was built in what was then referred to as Gretna. The church was closed in 1867. When St. Michael's was opened in Wheaton in 1872, St. Stephen's parishioners were transferred to that parish. The church building was dismantled sometime in the late 19th century. St. Stephen's Cemetery was located adjacent to the church building and was last used for burial in 1910. St. Stephen's Cemetery (located north of the Great Western Trail behind the Ozinga concrete plant on St. Charles Road) was rededicated 100 years later on September 12, 2010.

In 1952, a farm from the area was featured on NBC; it was the site for the first outdoor telecast by the network in 1954.

A common misconception is that the municipality of Carol Stream was named for a local minor waterway. In fact, Carol Stream is one of the few communities in America that took its name from the first and last names of a living person: Carol Stream, the daughter of its founder Jay Stream. Carol Stream herself moved to Arizona as an adult, living there until her death on January 18, 2020.

Jay W. Stream (April 17, 1921 – January 22, 2006), a military veteran who had previously sold insurance and ready-mix concrete, was in the mid-1950s heading Durable Construction Company. He became frustrated with red tape while negotiating a planned 350–400 home subdivision in nearby Naperville, Illinois. A Naperville clerk reportedly advised Stream to "build your own town", and in 1957, Stream began buying unincorporated farmland outside Wheaton. He hoped to allow people to work in the town they lived in, rather than have to commute to Chicago.

On August 26, 1957, Carol and three friends were returning from Racine, Wisconsin, in a 1949 Studebaker. While attempting to cross U.S. Route 45 in central Kenosha County, the car was struck in the right rear corner, killing 15-year-old Richard Christie of Chicago, the passenger seated there. Carol was ejected through the windshield and into a utility pole. Neurosurgeons at Kenosha Memorial Hospital said the comatose girl might never awaken or, if she did, would likely be severely handicapped. On advice of the doctors that her recovery might improve with good news, Jay decided to name the new community in her honor. After four months in a coma, Carol regained consciousness. Learning that the new village bore her full name, Carol said she thought it "odd and silly" at first (as she told Chicago Tribune reporter Eric Zorn in 1991).

Carol Stream was to be named Jacqueline Stream, but her parents changed her name to Carol when her due date fell near Christmas. She never lived in her namesake community, but moved from Wheaton, Illinois, to Arizona in 1957 following the end of her parents' marriage. She participated in municipal celebrations and rides in parades during anniversary celebrations of the municipality's 1959 incorporation, and she was frequently asked for autographs when she was in town. She died in Arizona on January 18, 2020.

One of the town's two middle schools, Jay Stream Middle School is named after the founder, Jay Stream, who died on January 22, 2006.

=== Municipal history ===
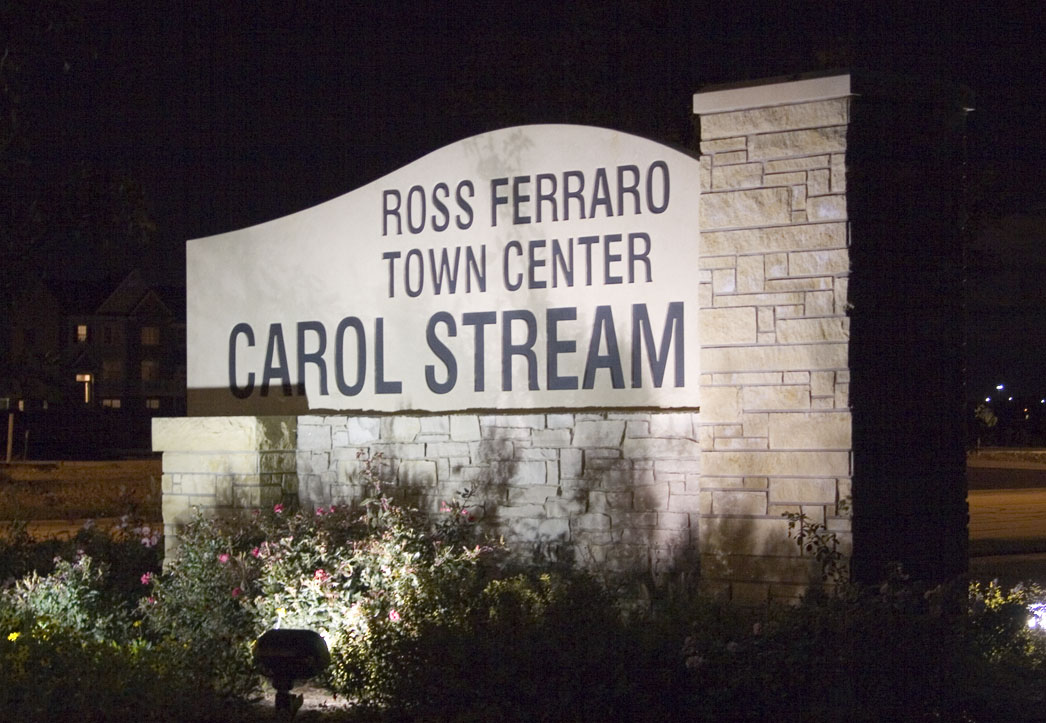
Ross Ferraro Town Center

- 1959: The village of Carol Stream is founded by Jay Stream, who envisions strong corporate growth in the area. First village board meeting on February 12.
- 1962: The Carol Stream Public Library opens at 397 Blackhawk Drive.
- 1965: The first Citizen of the Year Awards were given to Carl Bornholt and Elsie Johnson.
- 1966: The Carol Stream News (a paper) is founded.
- 1966: Nina Jo Schmale of Carol Stream is one of the eight student nurses killed by Richard Speck.
- 1972: The Carol Stream Fire Protection District is formed
- 1975: Janice Gerzevske is first woman elected Village President.
- 1976: As part of the United States Bicentennial celebrations, Carol Stream opens Gretna Station Museum with a July 4 dedication.
- 1984: The Carol Stream Association of Business and Industry is formed.
- 1987: Ross Ferraro is elected Mayor of Carol Stream.
- 1991: Village is re-certified as an Illinois certified city. Mark Bodane Appointed Fire Chief of the Carol Stream Fire District.
- 1992: The Carol Stream Post Office opens a regional processing center at Schmale and Fullerton. Most of the unincorporated areas around Carol Stream assume the ZIP Code of the new post office, causing some consternation among those who are used to having an address associated with Wheaton.
- 1992: The Carol Stream Chamber of Commerce is incorporated.
- 1998: The Town Center is dedicated, later to be known as the Ross Ferraro Town Center.
- 2003: Richard Willing becomes new police chief.
- 2006: Founder of Carol Stream, Jay Stream, dies January 22
- 2007: Frank Saverino replaces Ross Ferraro as Mayor, ending Ferraro's 20-year tenure. Mark Bodane retires as Fire Chief of Carol Stream Fire District.
- 2009: Carol Stream celebrates its 50th anniversary.
- 2020: Ms. Carol Stream dies January 18

== Geography ==
According to the 2021 census gazetteer files, Carol Stream has a total area of 9.44 square miles (24.45 km^{2}), of which 9.12 square miles (23.62 km^{2}) (or 96.64%) is land and 0.32 square miles (0.83 km^{2}) (or 3.36%) is water.

== Demographics ==
Historical population
Census	Pop.	Note	%±
1960	836		—
1970	4,434		430.4%
1980	15,472		248.9%
1990	31,716		105.0%
2000	40,438		27.5%
2010	39,711		−1.8%
2020	39,854		0.4%
U.S. Decennial Census; 2010 2020

=== Racial and ethnic composition ===
Carol Stream village, Illinois – Racial and ethnic composition Note: the US Census treats Hispanic/Latino as an ethnic category. This table excludes Latinos from the racial categories and assigns them to a separate category. Hispanics/Latinos may be of any race.
Race / Ethnicity (NH = Non-Hispanic)	Pop 2000	Pop 2010	Pop 2020	% 2000	% 2010	% 2020
White alone (NH)	29,524	25,106	21,547	73.01%	63.22%	54.06%
Black or African American alone (NH)	1,689	2,333	2,685	4.18%	5.87%	6.74%
Native American or Alaska Native alone (NH)	38	44	20	0.09%	0.11%	0.05%
Asian alone (NH)	4,496	5,778	7,427	11.12%	14.55%	18.64%
Pacific Islander alone (NH)	3	4	4	0.01%	0.01%	0.01%
Other race alone (NH)	59	82	175	0.15%	0.21%	0.44%
Mixed race or Multiracial (NH)	574	731	1,144	1.42%	1.84%	2.87%
Hispanic or Latino (any race)	4,055	5,633	6,852	10.03%	14.18%	17.19%
Total	40,438	39,711	39,854	100.00%	100.00%	100.00%

=== 2020 census ===
As of the 2020 census, Carol Stream had a population of 39,854. The population density was 4,223.16 inhabitants per square mile (1,630.57/km^{2}). The median age was 38.9 years. 22.0% of residents were under the age of 18 and 15.0% of residents were 65 years of age or older. For every 100 females there were 94.7 males, and for every 100 females age 18 and over there were 91.5 males age 18 and over.

100.0% of residents lived in urban areas, while 0.0% lived in rural areas.

There were 14,275 households in Carol Stream, of which 33.4% had children under the age of 18 living in them. Of all households, 55.2% were married-couple households, 15.1% were households with a male householder and no spouse or partner present, and 24.2% were households with a female householder and no spouse or partner present. About 22.3% of all households were made up of individuals and 8.9% had someone living alone who was 65 years of age or older.

There were 14,870 housing units at an average density of 1,575.71 per square mile (608.39/km^{2}), of which 4.0% were vacant. The homeowner vacancy rate was 0.8% and the rental vacancy rate was 7.2%.

=== Income and poverty ===
The median income for a household in the village was $89,820, and the median income for a family was $103,332. Males had a median income of $52,245 versus $38,920 for females. The per capita income for the village was $37,658. About 6.0% of families and 8.1% of the population were below the poverty line, including 12.4% of those under age 18 and 7.6% of those age 65 or over.

== Economy ==
=== Top employers ===
According to the Village's 2022 Comprehensive Annual Financial Report, the top employers in the city are:

#	Employer	# of Employees
1	Hearthside Food Solutions, LLC	650
2	FIC America Corp.	494
3	Grunt Style LLC	400
4	FedEx	369
5	American Litho Inc.	350
6	Diamond Marketing Solutions Group Inc.	335
7	Office Depot	280
8	Windsor Park	265
9	AJ Antunes & Co.	265
10	Tyndale House Publishers	260

The United States Postal Service's Sectional Hub for ZIP Codes with the prefixes 601 and 603 is located in this town.

== Arts and culture ==
The Carol Stream Public Library was founded in 1977. The library features conference rooms, a create and learn center, vending cafe and an outdoor patio with a gazebo.

== Parks and recreation ==
The Carol Stream Park District is responsible for building and maintaining public parks. There are 36 parks in the community, including:

- Armstrong Park, named after Neil Armstrong
- Aldrin Community Center, named after Buzz Aldrin
- Fountain View Recreation Center, which features indoor basketball, open swim, and a workout facility.
- Simkus Recreation Center
- Bark Park
- Coral Cove Water Park
- McCaslin Park
- Elk Trail Recreation Center
- Veterans Memorial Plaza
- Coyote Crossing Mini Golf

The Great Western Trail passes through the town.

== Government ==
Carol Stream is governed by a body known as the Legislative Board, which is composed of seven elected officials: a mayor and six trustees. Frank Saverino is the current mayor; his term of office runs from May 1, 2019, to April 30, 2023. The village clerk is also an elected position. The clerk's term of office is the same as the mayor's. A village administrator is appointed by the Legislative Board to manage the daily village operations.

== Education ==
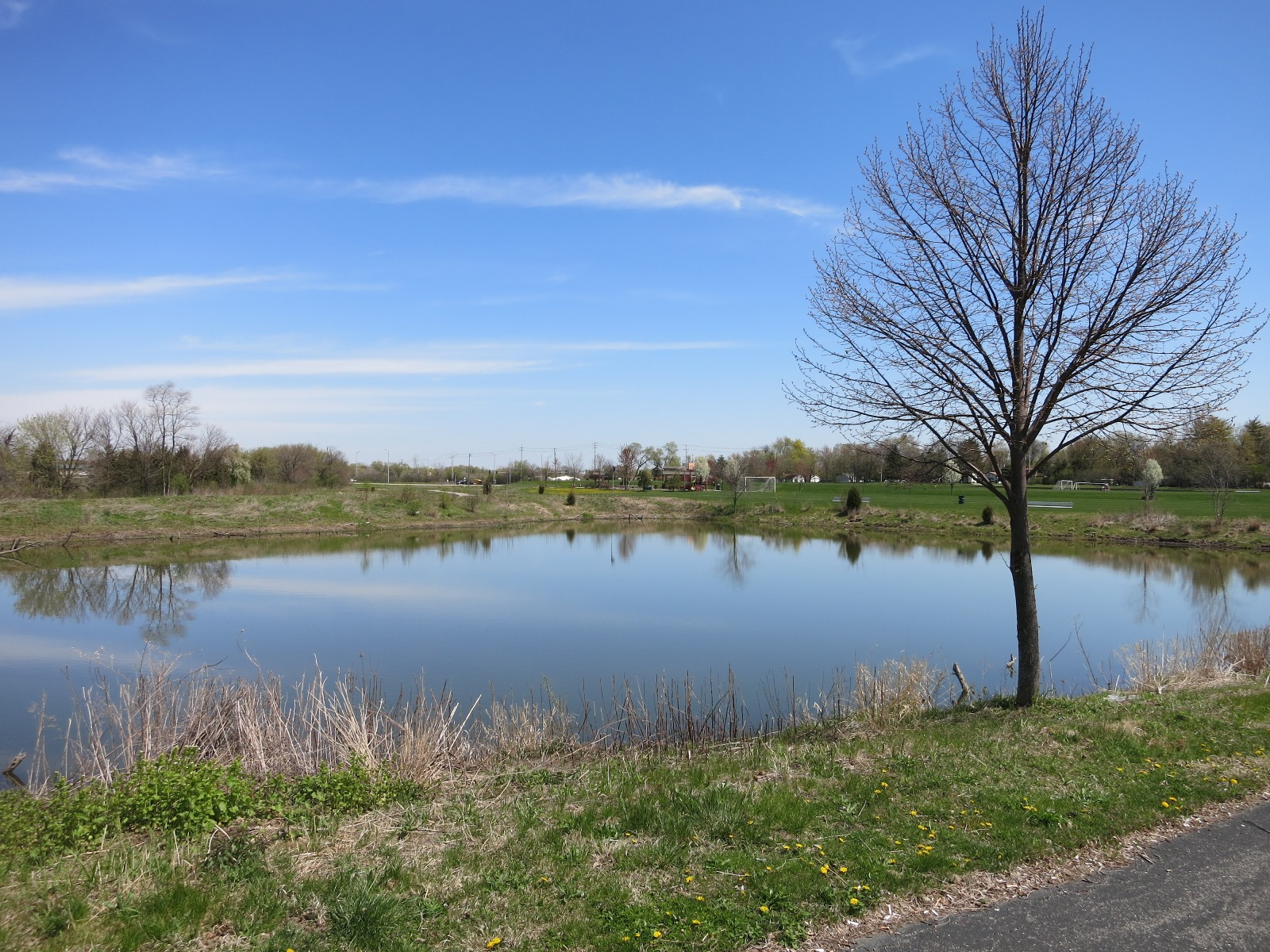
Operated by the Carol Stream Park District, Red Hawk Park is located at St. Charles and Kuhn Roads.

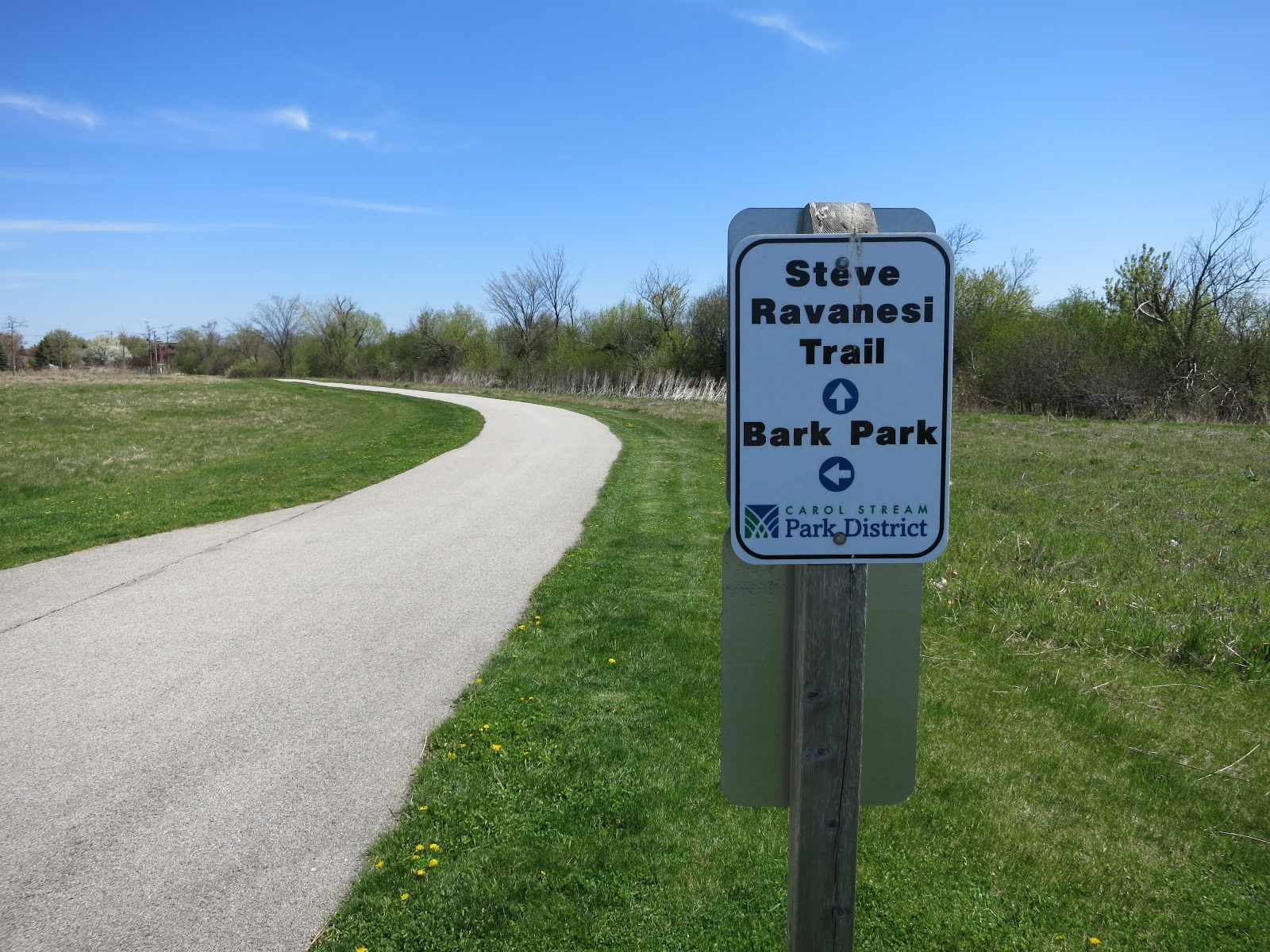
The Steve Ravanesi Trail connects the Great Western Trail with Red Hawk Park, the Bark Park and Glenbard North High School.

The village of Carol Stream's boundaries do not line up neatly with school district boundaries. The majority of residences in Carol Stream are zoned to Community Consolidated School District 93, a K–8 district, and Glenbard Township High School District 87. The District 93 schools are Carol Stream Elementary School, Cloverdale Elementary School, Elsie Johnson Elementary School, Heritage Lakes Elementary School, Roy DeShane Elementary School, Western Trails Elementary School, Jay Stream Middle School, and Stratford Middle School. District 93 is zoned to attend Glenbard North High School in Carol Stream, part of District 87.

The northwest corner of Carol Stream is served by Elgin Area School District U46, a K-12 unit school district. These students attend Spring Trail Elementary in Carol Stream for grades K-6, Eastview Middle School in Bartlett for grades 7–8, and Bartlett High School for grades 9-12.

A portion of west Carol Stream is served by Benjamin School District 25 for grades K-8, and then Community High School District 94 for grades 9-12. Students in District 25 attend Evergreen Elementary School in Carol Stream for grades K-4, and then Benjamin Middle School unincorporated West Chicago, for grades 5-8. District 25 feeds into West Chicago Community High School, which is the sole school of District 94.

Some southern and southeastern parts of Carol Stream are zoned to Community Unit School District 200 in Wheaton. Students may be assigned to Whittier, Sandberg, Washington, Pleasant Hill, Hawthorne, or Longfellow Elementary School; then Franklin or Monroe Middle School; and then Wheaton North High School.

A portion of southeast Carol Stream is zoned to Glen Ellyn School District 41, a K-8 district that mainly serves Glen Ellyn. These students attend Churchill Elementary School for grades K–5, then Hadley Junior High School for grades 6–8. Students that live in Carol Stream and zoned to District 41 are assigned to Glenbard North High School for grades 9-12, part of District 87.

== Infrastructure ==
=== Transportation ===
Carol Stream has six major roads running through the village. The most important of these is North Avenue, which runs relatively close to the center of Carol Stream. North Avenue is an east–west road which extends a further 30 miles east into Chicago as well as further west across the state. Army Trail Road and Geneva Road are the other major east–west roads.

Gary Avenue is a major north–south road to the commercial center of Bloomingdale and the Stratford Square Mall. County Farm Road also serves as a major commercial route for residents. Schmale Road serves a small commercial area on the southeastern side of Carol Stream. Kuhn Road also runs north–south, but is not that major.

Lies Road is a minor east–west road that bisects the village starting from Fair Oaks Road on the west to Schmale Road on the east. The portion from County Farm Road thru Kuhn Road to near Gary Avenue is the route for the annual Fourth of July parade.

A feeder line from the nearby Illinois Central Railroad serves the main industrial complex for Carol Stream. The old Gretna Railway Station had been renamed Carol Stream in 1962, the station manager of four years at the time, Frank S. Shilling, said he never found out why the station was named Gretna. The original building was preserved and moved to the Carol Stream Park District, where it serves as a museum and a home for the Carol Stream Historical Society.

Pace provides bus service on Route 711 connecting Carol Stream to Wheaton and other destinations.

== Notable people ==
- Justin Jackson, Detroit Lions running back
- Doris Karpiel, Illinois state legislator and businesswoman, lived in Carol Stream.
- Eric Petersen, actor. He was raised in Carol Stream.
