= Glendale Heights, Illinois =

- Village
- Flag

- Location of Glendale Heights in DuPage County, Illinois

- Location within Greater Chicago Location within Illinois Location within the United States
- Coordinates: 41°55′10″N 88°04′43″W
- Country: United States
- State: Illinois
- Counties: DuPage
- Incorporated: 1959

Government
  - Type: Council–manager

Area
  - Total: 5.53 sq mi (14.31 km^{2})
  - Land: 5.39 sq mi (13.95 km^{2})
  - Water: 0.14 sq mi (0.36 km^{2})
- Elevation: 797 ft (243 m)

Population (2020)
  - Total: 33,176
  - Density: 6,161.0/sq mi (2,378.76/km^{2})
- Time zone: UTC−6 (CST)
  - Summer (DST): UTC−5 (CDT)
- ZIP code: 60139
- Area code(s): 630, 331
- FIPS code: 17-29730
- GNIS feature ID: 2398974
- Website: www.glendaleheights.org

Glendale Heights is a village in DuPage County, Illinois, United States. Per the 2020 census, the population was 33,176. The village is almost entirely residential, and is a far west suburb of Chicago.

== History ==
Glendale Heights was a small farming area served by the Glen Ellyn post office up until the 1950s, with a population of just 104 in 1959. Midland Enterprises, run by Charles and Harold Reskin, started building houses in Glendale Heights in 1958. The Reskins bought two farms on Glen Ellyn Road north of North Avenue. Houses were first built on Glen Ellyn Road and Larry Lane near Fullerton Avenue. On June 16, 1959, a petition was filed and on July 13, the village became incorporated. The first election was held later that summer on August 2.

The town was originally named Glendale as it was between Glen Ellyn and Bloomingdale, but after a conflict arose with the small town of Glendale in Southern Illinois, the city decided in March 1960 to add the term Heights, in reference to its different topographies, a difference of about 100 feet (30 m) because of its location straddling the Valparaiso Moraine, thus becoming Glendale Heights.

== Geography ==
According to the 2021 census gazetteer files, Glendale Heights has a total area of 5.53 square miles (14.32 km^{2}), of which 5.39 square miles (13.96 km^{2}), or 97.45%, is land and 0.14 square miles (0.36 km^{2}), or 2.55%, is water.

== Demographics ==
Historical population
Census	Pop.	Note	%±
1960	173		—
1970	11,406		6,493.1%
1980	23,251		103.8%
1990	27,973		20.3%
2000	31,765		13.6%
2010	34,208		7.7%
2020	33,176		−3.0%
2021 (est.)	32,796	▼	−1.1%
U.S. Decennial Census; 2010 2020

=== Racial and ethnic composition ===
Glendale Heights village, Illinois – Racial and ethnic composition Note: the US Census treats Hispanic/Latino as an ethnic category. This table excludes Latinos from the racial categories and assigns them to a separate category. Hispanics/Latinos may be of any race.
Race / Ethnicity (NH = Non-Hispanic)	Pop 2000	Pop 2010	Pop 2020	% 2000	% 2010	% 2020
White alone (NH)	17,409	13,438	10,327	54.81%	39.28%	31.13%
Black or African American alone (NH)	1,484	1,939	3,931	4.70%	5.67%	11.85%
Native American or Alaska Native alone (NH)	48	61	381	0.15%	0.18%	1.15%
Asian alone (NH)	6,303	7,528	7,507	19.84%	22.01%	22.63%
Pacific Islander alone (NH)	24	19	36	0.08%	0.06%	0.11%
Other race alone (NH)	40	67	145	0.13%	0.20%	0.44%
Mixed race or Multiracial (NH)	605	644	3,042	1.90%	1.88%	9.17%
Hispanic or Latino (any race)	5,842	10,512	10,092	18.39%	30.73%	30.42%
Total	31,765	34,208	33,176	100.00%	100.00%	100.00%

=== 2020 census ===
As of the 2020 census, Glendale Heights had a population of 33,176. The median age was 35.9 years. 23.4% of residents were under the age of 18 and 12.4% were 65 years of age or older. For every 100 females there were 98.3 males, and for every 100 females age 18 and over there were 96.3 males age 18 and over.

100.0% of residents lived in urban areas, while 0.0% lived in rural areas.

There were 11,414 households in Glendale Heights, including 8,293 families. Of all households, 35.5% had children under the age of 18 living in them. About 49.4% were married-couple households, 18.9% had a male householder and no spouse or partner present, and 24.7% had a female householder and no spouse or partner present. About 23.5% of all households were made up of individuals, and 6.4% had someone living alone who was 65 years of age or older.

There were 11,874 housing units; 3.9% were vacant. The homeowner vacancy rate was 1.1%, and the rental vacancy rate was 5.8%. The population density was 6,003.62 inhabitants per square mile (2,318.01/km^{2}), and housing density was 2,148.75 per square mile (829.64/km^{2}).

=== Income and poverty ===
The median income for a household in the village was $70,034, and the median income for a family was $71,226. Males had a median income of $42,911 versus $30,974 for females. The per capita income for the village was $29,225. About 8.3% of families and 9.9% of the population were below the poverty line, including 18.4% of those under age 18 and 3.7% of those age 65 or over.

== Economy ==
According to Glendale Height's 2022 Comprehensive Annual Financial Report, the top employers in the city are:

#	Employer	# of Employees
1	Spraying Systems Co.	1,000
2	Cornelius, Inc.	500
3	Kronos Food Inc.	400
4	Super Target	204
5	Jewel Osco	200

== Schools ==
Glendale Heights has three school districts: 15, 16 and 41. All of these districts are K–8 and feed into Glenbard Township district 87. Though there are three school districts, there is only one library district: the Glenside Public Library District.

Queen Bee District 16

District 16 has two schools: Glen Hill and Pheasant Ridge that are K–3. Americana is for 4th and 5th grades. The middle school's name is Glenside and used to be referred to as a junior high. District 16's namesake school, Queen Bee, is no longer used as an elementary school. The building is still standing on Bloomingdale Road and used for other purposes. District 16 students are split between Glenbard North and Glenbard West for high school.

Marquardt District 15

Marquardt School District 15 has four elementary schools: G. Stanley Hall School, Winnebago School, Blackhawk School, and Charles G. Reskin School. The middle school, Marquardt, is the district's school. Marquardt has a separate building for the sixth grade students, and another for 7th and 8th grade students. District 15 serves the eastern part of Glendale Heights, parts of Addison, southern section of Bloomingdale, unincorporated Lombard, and the northern part of Glen Ellyn Countryside. Winnebago school has a Bloomingdale address, but sits very close to the Glendale Heights border. District 15 feeds primarily into Glenbard East High School.

Glen Ellyn School District 41

District 41 has four elementary schools: Abraham Lincoln, Benjamin Franklin, Churchill and Forest Glen. Students that live in Glendale Heights within the boundaries of District 41 attend Abraham Lincoln. Hadley Junior High is the fifth school, and it is a separate facility for students enrolled sixth, seventh and eighth grades. District 41 serves parts of Carol Stream, Glendale Heights, Glen Ellyn, Lombard and Wheaton. Students that live in Glendale Heights within the boundaries of District 41 feed into Glenbard West High School.

== Transportation ==
Pace provides bus service on Routes 711 and 715 connecting Glendale Heights to Wheaton and other destinations.

== Notable people ==
- Billy Corgan, guitarist and singer of the Smashing Pumpkins, grew up in Glendale Heights.
- Jeremy Hammond, political activist, hacktivist, and anarchist, born and grew up in Glendale Heights.
