= Jackson Kent =

American baseball player (born 2003)

Washington Nationals – No. 25
- Pitcher
- Born: February 10, 2003 (age 23); Elk Grove Village, Illinois, U.S.
- Bats: Left Throws: Left

MLB debut
- August 12, 2026, for the Washington Nationals

MLB statistics (through 2026 season)
- Win–loss record: 2–4
- Earned run average: 5.94
- Strikeouts: 30
- Stats at Baseball Reference

Teams
- Washington Nationals (2026–present)

Jackson John Kent (born February 10, 2003) is an American professional baseball pitcher for the Washington Nationals of Major League Baseball (MLB).

== Career ==
Kent attended Lake Park High School in Roselle, Illinois and played college baseball at University of Wisconsin–Milwaukee and the University of Arizona. In 2023, he played collegiate summer baseball with the Yarmouth–Dennis Red Sox of the Cape Cod Baseball League. He was selected by the Washington Nationals in the fourth round of the 2024 Major League Baseball draft. Kent spent his first professional season in 2025 with the Wilmington Blue Rocks and Double-A Harrisburg Senators.

Kent started the 2026 season with Harrisburg and was later promoted to the Triple-A Rochester Red Wings. On August 12, 2026, Kent was selected to the 40–man roster and promoted to the major leagues for the first time. He faced the Chicago Cubs that night, yielding three runs in four innings pitched.

Kent earned his first major league win August 28, 2026, pitching seven innings against the Miami Marlins while allowing just one run.
