= Mike DiNunno =

American-Italian basketball player

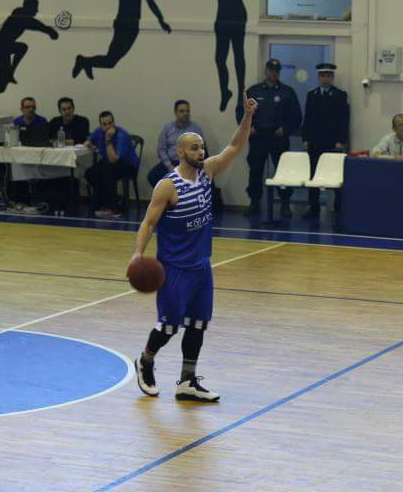

Personal information
- Born: January 29, 1990 (age 36) Maywood, Illinois
- Listed height: 5 ft 11 in (1.80 m)
- Listed weight: 192 lb (87 kg)

Career information
- High school: Lake Park (Roselle, Illinois); Von Steuben (Chicago, Illinois)
- College: Northern Illinois (2008–2010); Eastern Kentucky (2011–2013)
- Playing career: 2013–2022
- Position: Point guard

Career history
- 2013–2014: Beroe
- 2014: Nord Barese
- 2014–2015: Cheshire Phoenix
- 2015–2016: Iraklis Thessaloniki
- 2017: Cheshire Phoenix
- 2017–2018: Beroe
- 2019: KR
- 2019: Básquet Coruña
- 2022: Virtus Fondi

Career highlights
- Icelandic champion (2019); Bulgarian Supercup Winner (2017); First-team All-OVC (2013); OVC All-Newcomer Team (2012); MAC All-Freshman team (2009)

Michele Christopher Di Nunno (born January 29, 1990) is an American-Italian former basketball player, playing the point guard position. Born in Maywood, Illinois, he played high school basketball at Lake Park and Von Steuben. Initially, he committed to Northern Illinois to play college basketball, where he received MAC All-Freshman team honors. After two seasons, he transferred to Eastern Kentucky. DiNunno was named in the OVC All-Newcomer team in his junior season and first team all-OVC in his senior season at Eastern Kentucky. Following his graduation, he has played professionally in several leagues in Europe. In 2019 he won the Icelandic championship as a member of KR.

== High school career ==
DiNunno started his high school career at Lake Park. In his sophomore season, he posted 17 points per game. He then went on to transfer to Von Steuben to play under coach Vince Carter. In his debut in the CPL he posted 19 points, 4 rebounds and 4 assists to help his team win against Morgan Park. In his junior season, Dinunno averaged 18 points, five assists and four rebounds per game. He improved his numbers in his senior season averaging 22 points, 4.3 rebounds and 5.2 assists per game, to lead his school to a 24–6 record. Von Steuben won sectional titles in his junior and senior season and DiNunno received all-state honorable mentions in both seasons. DiNunno was a two-star recruit according to Rivals.com and a three star recruit according to 247Sports.com, ranked 83rd in the point guard position.

College recruiting
Name	Hometown	School	Height	Weight	Commit date
Mike DiNunno; PG	Maywood, ILL	Von Steuben	5 ft 11 in (1.80 m)	160 lb (73 kg)	Jul 23, 2007
Mike DiNunno; PG	Recruit ratings: Scout: Rivals: 247Sports: (N/A)				
Overall recruit ranking: 247Sports: 387, 83 (PG)
Note: In many cases, Scout, Rivals, 247Sports, On3, and ESPN may conflict in their listings of height and weight.; In these cases, the average was taken. ESPN grades are on a 100-point scale.; Sources: "Northern Illinois 2008 Basketball Commitments". Rivals.; "2008 Northern Illinois Commits". Scout.; "2008 Player Commitments – Northern Illinois". ESPN.; "Scout.com Team Recruiting Rankings". Scout.; "2008 Team Ranking". Rivals.

== College career ==
DiNunno was initially offered a scholarship to play for Northern Illinois by Rob Judson, but committed to the school in 2007 as the offer was confirmed by new head coach Ricardo Patton. Three games into his freshman season, DiNunno had a Northern Illinois career-high in scoring with 27 points, to help the Huskies overcome Indiana State 86–79. Against Southeast Missouri State he posted a career-high 6 steals to combine with 16 points and 5 assists. By leading all MAC freshmen in scoring, assists, free throw percentage, three-pointers made and minutes played, he was named in the conference's all-freshman team. Before the start of his sophomore season, three of DiNunno's grandparents died within a month and a half; later on he admitted it was a difficult task to balance that with performing at 19 years of age. Versus Western Michigan, DiNunno recorded his first career double-double by posting a season-high 21 points and a career-best 10 assists, to help his team win its fourth game in a row. Following the end of his sophomore season DiNunno announced that he would not return to Northern Illinois for his junior season.

DiNunno initially planned to transfer to, NCAA Division II college, Quincy. After Luke Strege left Quincy to join Eastern Kentucky as an assistant coach and recruiting coordinator, DiNunno chose to transfer to Eastern Kentucky to continue playing Division I basketball. His transfer was made official in May 2010 with DiNunno having to sit out for the 2010–11 season due to NCAA transfer rules. He had a career-high 33 points performance against Tennessee State as his team lost 91–85 in double overtime. For his performances in his first season at Eastern Kentucky he was named in OVC All-Newcomer Team, an honor given to first year players in the league, freshmen and transfers. In his senior season, DiNunno made a lay-up with 2.3 seconds left in the game against Western Carolina to help his team win and reach a 7–0 record. The record was extended to 9–0, the school's best start in 66 years. Starting all 34 games he played in the season, he achieved a season-high 24 points performance four times; three of them were in consecutive games in January versus Belmont, Jacksonville State and Tennessee State, the fourth being against Tennessee State in March. By leading Eastern Kentucky in scoring, assists and steals and guiding the team to a school record in victories, DiNunno was named first team all-OVC in 2013.

=== College statistics ===
Legend
GP	Games played	GS	Games started	MPG	Minutes per game
FG%	Field goal percentage	3P%	3-point field goal percentage	FT%	Free throw percentage
RPG	Rebounds per game	APG	Assists per game	SPG	Steals per game
BPG	Blocks per game	PPG	Points per game	**Bold**	Career high

Year	Team	GP	GS	MPG	FG%	3P%	FT%	RPG	APG	SPG	BPG	PPG
2008–09	Northern Illinois	30	29	29.5	.352	.339	.732	**2.2**	2.6	1.5	.0	11.9
2009–10	Northern Illinois	30	21	23.7	.312	.290	.629	1.6	3.0	1.0	.0	7.0
Did not play in the 2010–11 season due to NCAA transfer rules.
2011–12	Eastern Kentucky	32	30	28.6	.400	.277	.811	1.9	2.8	1.5	.0	9.5
2012–13	Eastern Kentucky	**34**	**34**	**35.3**	**.422**	**.389**	**.853**	2.1	**4.3**	**1.9**	.0	**14.8**
Career		126	114	29.4	.377	.345	.779	1.9	3.2	1.5	.0	11.0

== Professional career ==
Following his graduation from college, DiNunno signed his first professional contract in Bulgaria with Beroe in November 2013. He scored a season-high 41 points against Levski Sofia. With Beroe he started 5 of his 6 games with the team averaging 23.7 points, 3 rebounds, 2.2 assists and 1.5 steals per game, in 32.3 minutes playing times. After leaving Beroe in January, he joined Nord Barese in Italy and scored 16 points in 21 minutes in his debut in January 2014. He had a season-high 20 points performance against Ferrara. DiNunno appeared in 10 games for Nord Barese, averaging 14.6 points, 2.9 rebounds and 4 assists per game.

In October 2014, DiNunno signed for British Basketball League team Cheshire Phoenix. He had 36 points, 4 assists and 4 steals against the Manchester Giants, to achieve season-highs in scoring and steals. He dished out a season-high 10 assists to help his team get past the Glasgow Rocks. He was waived by the club in April due to a back injury that kept him out for almost a month. His team, that started the season 1–4, went 17–3 when DiNunno played. He played in 21 games in the BBL, averaging 15.9 points, 2.1 rebounds, 4.5 assists and 1.9 steals per game. In August 2015 DiNunno signed an annual contract with Greek A2 team Iraklis Thessaloniki. He scored a game-high 26 points in his debut for Iraklis, helping his team get a narrow 82–81 away win against Ethnikos Piraeus for the first round of the Greek Cup. He scored a season-high 31 points against Psychiko, shooting 6-of-10 three-pointers. On 30 January 2016 his contract with the team was terminated by mutual consent. Totally he appeared in 11 league games for Iraklis averaging 16.2 points, 1.9 rebounds, 3.3 assists, and 1.9 steals per game.

In February 2017 DiNunno returned to Cheshire Phoenix to play under head coach Robbie Peers. On 2 April 2017 he led the Phoenix to victory over the London Lions scoring 40 points.

DiNunno started the 2017–2018 season with BC Beroe, helping them win the Bulgarian Supercup on 17 September 2017. In 9 games in the Bulgarian National Basketball League, he averaged 11.2 points and 5.4 assists.

In January 2019, DiNunno signed with reigning Úrvalsdeild karla champions KR. After a rough start, which included a scoreless outing against Tindastóll, he ended the season on a high note, averaging 23.0 points in the last four regular season games. In the playoffs he averaged 16.7 points in KR's first round sweep of Keflavík. On 4 May 2019 he won the Icelandic championship after KR beat ÍR in the Úrvalsdeild finals 3–2, scoring a game high 27 points in the fifth and deciding game.

In July 2019, DiNunno signed with LEB Oro club Básquet Coruña.

In end of January 2020, DiNunno returned to KR, signing with the team for the rest of the season. However, the rest of the Úrvalsdeild season was canceled due to the coronavirus pandemic in Iceland before he played a game. On 3 September 2020, KR announced that DiNunno would not return to the team for the upcoming season.

In 2022, DiNunno joined AD Virtus Basket Fondi in the Italian Serie C Gold Basket where he averaged 32.9 points in 7 games.

== Personal ==
DiNunno was born on January 29, 1990, in Maywood, Illinois, to Kathleen and Mike DiNunno. He has five siblings, Nadia, Kalie, Nikalia, Niko and Mariono. Mike DiNunno was given an Italian passport in February 2013, allowing him dual citizenship to play as an Italian.
