= Christine Winger =

American politician

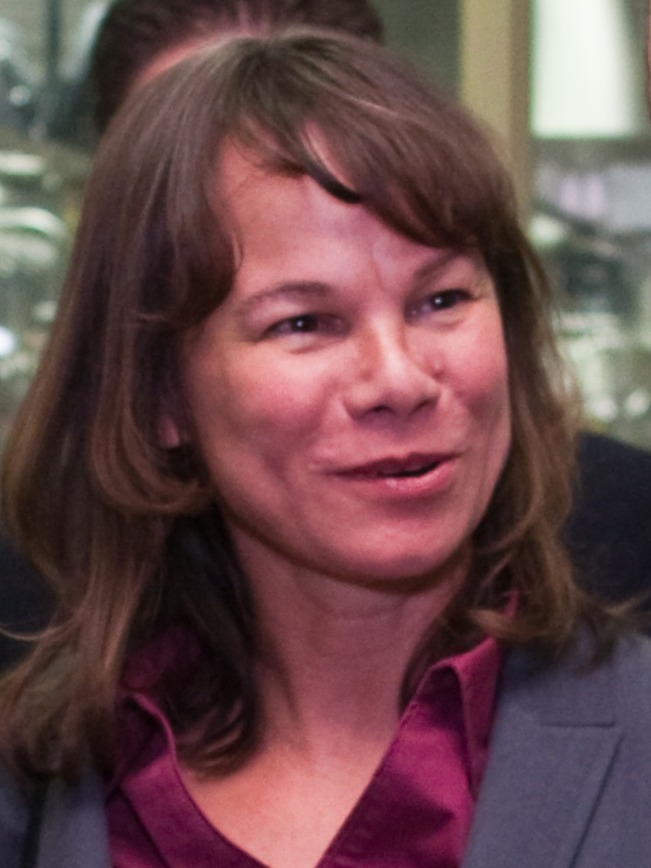
- Winger in 2014

Member of the Illinois House of Representatives from the 45th district
- In office January 14, 2015 – January 9, 2019
- Preceded by: Dennis Reboletti
- Succeeded by: Diane Pappas

Personal details
- Party: Republican
- Spouse: Mark Winger
- Education: Illinois State University (B.S.)

Christine Jennifer Winger is an American politician and served as the Republican member of the Illinois House of Representatives from the 45th district from 2015 to 2019. The 45th district includes all or parts of Addison, Bartlett, Bloomingdale, Carol Stream, Hanover Park, Itasca, Medinah, Roselle, Wayne, West Chicago, and Wood Dale. In the 2018 general election, Winger lost to Democratic candidate Diane Pappas.
