= Diane Pappas =

American politician

Member of the Illinois Senate from the 23rd district
- In office March 9, 2022 – January 11, 2023
- Preceded by: Tom Cullerton
- Succeeded by: Suzy Glowiak Hilton (redistricted)

Member of the Illinois House of Representatives from the 45th district
- In office January 9, 2019 – January 13, 2021
- Preceded by: Christine Winger
- Succeeded by: Seth Lewis

Personal details
- Born: 1970 or 1971 (age 54–55) Poland
- Party: Democratic
- Spouse: William Pappas
- Education: Michigan State University (BA); Yale Law School (JD)
- Profession: Attorney
- Website: Official campaign website

Diane Pappas is an American politician. She served as a Democratic member of the Illinois Senate from 2022 to 2023 and the Illinois House of Representatives from 2019 to 2021.

== Background and personal life ==
Pappas was born in Poland and immigrated to the United States aged 11. She attended Lake Park High School. She then earned a Bachelor of Arts from Michigan State University and a juris doctor from Yale Law School. Pappas is an attorney from Itasca specializing in corporate negotiations and contracts. She has worked for Motorola Solutions, YRC Worldwide, and Locke Lord. Pappas was previously President of the Friends of Itasca Community Library. She is currently married to William Pappas. The couple has no children.

== Illinois House of Representatives ==
=== 2018 election ===
Pappas became politically involved in 2018 when she became an elected precinct committeewoman with the local Democratic organization in Addison Township. In the summer of 2018, Pappas was nominated by the local Democratic organizations in the district to run against the then-unopposed Republican incumbent Christine Winger. Pappas narrowly defeated Republican incumbent Christine Winger with 50.8% of the vote to represent the Republican-leaning district.

=== 2020 election ===
Pappas lost the 2020 general election to Republican candidate Seth Lewis.

=== Tenure ===
Pappas represented Illinois 45th district, which at the time was located in northern DuPage County and included all or parts of Addison, Bartlett, Bloomingdale, Carol Stream, Hanover Park, Itasca, Medinah, Roselle, Wayne, West Chicago, and Wood Dale. Pappas was sworn into office on January 9, 2019. During the 101st General Assembly, Pappas served on the following committees: Adoption & Child Welfare; Cities & Villages; Cybersecurity, Data Analytics, & IT; General Service Appropriations-General Service; and Prescription Drug Affordability.

==== Airport noise mitigation ====
Pappas proposed the creation of an income tax credit in an amount equal to the amount paid by the taxpayer for purchasing acoustical materials, other materials, labor, and professional services to soundproof a residential home located near airports against aircraft noise. This credit, if passed, would have allowed constituents living near O'Hare International Airport's new flightpaths to soundproof their homes.

==== Healthcare ====
Along with Deb Conroy, Pappas introduced legislation to provide coverage for the treatment of serious mental illnesses and serious emotional disturbances.

Diane Pappas is pro-choice on abortion and voted for the Reproductive Healthcare Act. Dan Proft's conservative political publications and Republican legislators Mark Batinick (R-Plainfield) and Darren Bailey (R-Xenia) criticized Pappas for an alleged remark that invoked castration when speaking about female autonomy at a town hall.

==== Tax reforms ====
Pappas proposed House Bill 338 which would create an assessment freeze homestead exemption for persons receiving federal Supplemental Security Income; a means tested program that is part of the Social Security Act. Pappas voted to place a referendum on the 2020 general election ballot that would allow the state of Illinois to repeal its current flat tax structure in favor of a progressive tax structure if passed by 60% of voters. Pappas supported Senate Bill 1217, which lowered the amount of money that municipalities are required to devote to tourism from the hotel/motel tax from 100% to 75%. The change had been long sought by local leaders in smaller towns to fund economic development efforts and infrastructure improvements.

== Illinois Senate ==
Pappas was appointed to the Illinois Senate to succeed Tom Cullerton after Cullerton pleaded guilty to federal embezzlement charges and resigned from office.

As of July 2022, Senator Pappas is a member of the following Illinois Senate committees:

- Energy and Public Utilities Committee (SENE)
- Insurance Committee (SINS)
- Transportation Committee (STRN)
- Veterans Affairs Committee (SVET)

== Electoral history ==
Illinois 45th State House District General Election, 2018
Party	Candidate	Votes	%
Democratic	Diane Pappas	20,383	50.84
Republican	Christine Jennifer Winger (incumbent)	19,711	49.16
Total votes		40,094	100.0

Illinois 45th State House District General Election, 2020
Party	Candidate	Votes	%
Republican	Seth Lewis	30,246	53.22
Democratic	Diane Pappas (incumbent)	26,590	46.78
Total votes		56,836	100.0
