= Scott Kellar =

American gridiron football player (born 1963)

No. 94
- Position: Nose tackle

Personal information
- Born: December 31, 1963 (age 62); Elgin, Illinois, U.S.
- Listed height: 6 ft 3 in (1.91 m)
- Listed weight: 281 lb (127 kg)

Career information
- High school: Lake Park (Roselle, Illinois)
- College: Northern Illinois
- NFL draft: 1986: 5th round, 117th overall pick

Career history
- Indianapolis Colts (1986–1988); Green Bay Packers (1989)*; Minnesota Vikings (1989)*; Ottawa Rough Riders (1989)*
- * Offseason or practice squad member only

Career NFL statistics
- Sacks: 1
- Stats at Pro Football Reference

Scott Jeffery Kellar (born December 31, 1963) is an American former professional football player who was a nose tackle for two seasons with the Indianapolis Colts of the National Football League (NFL). He was selected by the Colts in the fifth round of the 1986 NFL draft after playing college football for the Northern Illinois Huskies.

== Early life ==
Kellar participated in high school football and track at Lake Park High School in Roselle, Illinois. He was the league discus record-holder and a state meet finalist in shot put.

== College career ==
Kellar played for the Huskies at the Northern Illinois University from 1982 to 1985. He recorded 298 career tackles. He earned Huskies' defensive MVP, First-team All-MAC and Associated Press Honorable Mention All-America honors in 1984. Kellar was named Northern Illinois tri-captain and garnered Second-team All-MAC accolades his senior year in 1985. He received the Broderick-Andres Award as outstanding Northern Illinois male student-athlete for the 1985–86 school year. He was also a two-time winner of the NIU Abe Rosenbloom Lineman Award in 1984 and 1985. Kellar was named to the All-Time Huskie Stadium Team in 1995 and the Huskies' All-Century Team in 1999. He was inducted into the Northern Illinois University Athletics Hall of Fame in 1993.

== Professional career ==
Kellar was selected by the Indianapolis Colts of the NFL in the fifth round with the 117th overall pick in the 1986 NFL draft and signed with the team on July 19, 1986. He played in fourteen games, starting eight, for the Colts during the 1986 season. He played in three games, starting two, for the team in 1987 before suffering a knee injury. Kellar was released by the Colts on August 23, 1988. He spent some of the 1989 off-season with the NFL's Green Bay Packers. He was released by the Packers on August 3, 1989. Kellar also spent time with the Minnesota Vikings of the NFL during the 1989 off-season. He was also a member of the Ottawa Rough Riders of the Canadian Football League in 1989. He then retired from football.

== Coaching career ==
Kellar was named defensive line coach at the College of DuPage in 1990 and spent ten years there. He was the defensive line coach at Western Kentucky University in 1992. He was named strength and conditioning coach at Bowling Green State University in 2000. Kellar became strength and conditioning coach at the University of Houston in 2001.

== Personal life ==
Kellar's brother Mark also played football at Northern Illinois University and in the National Football League.
