= Lake Park High School =

Public high school in Roselle, Illinois

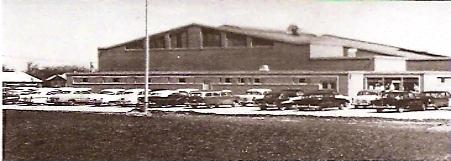

Location
- 600 S. Medinah Road; Roselle, IL 60172 (East); 500 W. Bryn Mawr Ave. Roselle, IL 60172 (West); United States; East Campus: 41°58′24″N 88°03′14″W; West Campus: 41°58′36″N 88°05′37″W

Information
- Type: Public high school
- Established: 1956
- School district: Lake Park Community High School District 108
- Superintendent: Michael Wojtowicz
- Principal: Sean Potts (East)
- Principal: Alexa Ellett (West)
- Teaching staff: 165.90 (on an FTE basis)
- Grades: 9–10 (East); 11–12 (West)
- Enrollment: 2,522 (as of 2024–2025)
- Student to teacher ratio: 15.20
- Campus: Suburban
- Colors: Navy Blue; White
- Athletics conference: DuKane Conference
- Mascot: Lancers
- Accreditation: Illinois State Board of Education
- Publication: Montage
- Newspaper: Perspective
- Yearbook: Lance
- Website: www.lphs.org

Lake Park High School is a four-year public high school occupying two campuses, both located in Roselle, Illinois, a western suburb of Chicago. Freshmen and sophomores attend the East Campus (the original campus built in 1956), located near Medinah, and juniors and seniors attend the West Campus. It is part of the Lake Park Community High School District 108. Students from Roselle (mostly), Medinah, Bloomingdale (partial), Itasca, Wood Dale (partial), Keeneyville, and Hanover Park (partial) attend the school.

== History ==
The name "Lake Park" is derived from the campuses being between "Lake" Street and Irving "Park" Road. The citizens of northwestern DuPage County, Illinois founded Lake Park High School District 108 in 1953, and the doors opened at what is now East Campus, 600 South Medinah Road, Roselle, in September 1956 to 320 students. In less than twenty years, the number of students had increased substantially and West Campus was built in 1975. The east campus borders the Medinah Country Club. The Lancers primarily rival the Glenbard North Panthers in Carol Stream.

== Athletics ==
Lake Park has 30 athletic teams, of which there are 14 boys, 12 girls teams and 4 co-ed teams that compete in the DuKane Conference and Illinois High School Association.

- Boys
  - Baseball
  - Basketball
  - Bowling
  - Cheerleading
  - Cross country
  - Football
  - Golf
  - Gymnastics
  - Lacrosse
  - Soccer
  - Swim & Dive
  - Tennis
  - Track
  - Volleyball
  - Wrestling
- Girl
  - Badminton
  - Basketball
  - Bowling
  - Cheerleading
  - Cross Country
  - Diving
  - Flag Football
  - Golf
  - Gymnastics
  - Lancettes
  - Soccer
  - Softball
  - Swim & Dive
  - Tennis
  - Track
  - Volleyball

=== State titles ===
- Boys Gymnastics – 2023
- Boys Track – 1997, 2010-13.
- Girls Bowling – 1986–87 and 1994–95
- Boys Bowling – 2008–2009
- Cheerleading (Coed) 2011
- Competitive Dance (Lancettes) 2022–2023 and 2025-2026

== Exchanges ==
Lake Park has an exchange program with Helene-Lange-Gymnasium in Hamburg, Germany, allowing students and staff to experience each other's culture and lifestyle.

== Notable alumni ==
- Mike Catalano, class of 2014, former professional soccer player
- Mike DiNunno, did not graduate, professional basketball player
- Tim Ehrhardt, class of 2013, professional decathlete
- Lindsay Flanagan, class of 2009, professional long distance runner and silver medalist at the 2015 Pan American Games
- Mark Gorski, class of 1978, Olympic gold medalist (track cycling Individual sprint, 1984 Summer Olympics)
- Keith Hackney, class of 1976, mixed martial arts fighter.
- Scott Kellar, class of 1982, football player
- Glenn Kotche, class of 1989, drummer for the band Wilco, Grammy Award winner (2005)
- Camden Murphy, class of 2014, NASCAR and Monster Jam driver
- Mike Panasiuk, class of 2016, NFL center for the Indianapolis Colts
- Diane Pappas, class of 1990, former Democratic member of the Illinois House of Representatives
- Tony Randazzo, class of 1983, MLB umpire
- Angela Rose, class of 1996, activist and founder of the nonprofit PAVE: Promoting Awareness, Victim Empowerment
- Duncan Rouleau, class of 1982, comic book writer and artist
- Don Schulze, class of 1980, Major League Baseball player (Chicago Cubs, Cleveland Indians, Japan League)
- Rodney A. Smolla, class of 1971, Dean of the Widener University School of Law
- Robert Shallcross, class of 1976, screenwriter and director of movies such as "Uncle Nino" (2003) "Bored Silly" (2000) and writer "Little Giants" (1994)
- Perrion Winfrey, class of 2018, football player
- Sarah Zelenka, class of 2005, rower at the 2012 Summer Olympics
- Zach Ziemek, class of 2011, decathlete at the 2015 World Championships in Athletics 2 time olympian. 2016 RIO Olympics 7th place. 2021 Tokyo Olympics 6th place. 2022 world champion ship Eugene, Oregon bronze medalist.
- Jackson Kent, class of 2021, Major League Baseball pitcher (Washington Nationals)
- Tanner Koziol, did not graduate, National Leauge Football tight end (Jacksonville Jaguars)
