= Tim Ehrhardt =

American track and field athlete

Personal information
- Born: March 16, 1995 (age 31) Addison, Illinois, U.S.
- Height: 6 ft 2 in (1.88 m)

Sport
- Sport: Track and field
- Events: Decathlon; Heptathlon; Pole vault
- College team: Michigan State University '18; Lake Park High School
- Club: Santa Barbara Track Club
- Turned pro: 2018

Achievements and titles
Personal bests
Outdoor Day 1
100 metres	10.67 s
Long Jump	7.46 m (24 ft 6 in)
Shot Put	14.49 m (47 ft 6 in)
High jump	2.01 m (6 ft 7 in)
400 metres	47.57 s Day 2
110 metres hurdles	15.29 s
Discus	43.57 m (142 ft 11 in)
Pole vault	5.41 m (17 ft 9 in)
Javelin	53.08 m (174 ft 2 in)
1500 metres	4:23.66
Decathlon	8066 points
200 metres	22.72 s Indoor Day 1
60 metres i	6.98 s
Long Jump i	7.47 m (24 ft 6 in)
Shot Put i	14.57 m (47 ft 10 in)
High jump i	2.05 m (6 ft 9 in); Day 2
60 metres Hurdles i	8.54 s
Pole vault i	5.60 m (18 ft 4 in)
1000 metres i	2:40.99
Heptathlon i	5868 points
Medal record
Men's athletics
Representing the United States
Thorpe Cup
2018 Thorpe Cup	Decathlon
Pan American Combined Events Cup
2016 Pan American Combined Events Cup	Decathlon

Tim Ehrhardt (born March 16, 1995) is an American athlete specializing in decathlon and pole vault.

== High school ==
Ehrhardt graduated from Lake Park High School in 2013 in Roselle, Illinois.

== NCAA ==
Ehrhardt graduated from Michigan State University.

Ehrhardt is a 6-time NCAA Division I First Team All-American, a former resident of Whitehills, and a 3-time Big Ten Conference Track and field champion. Ehrhardt holds Michigan State Spartans records in the indoor pole vault 5.60 m (18 ft 4 in) and decathlon 8,044 points.

Representing Michigan State Spartans
School Year	Big Ten Conference Indoor track and field Championships	NCAA Division I Indoor track and field Championships	Big Ten Conference Outdoor Track and Field Championships	NCAA Division I Outdoor Track and Field Championships
2014 Freshman	Pole Vault 2nd, 5.21 m (17 ft 1 in)		Pole Vault 12th, 4.95 m (16 ft 3 in)	
2015 Sophomore	Pole Vault 1st, 5.37 m (17 ft 7 in); Heptathlon 2nd, 5741 points	Heptathlon 7th, 5669 points	Pole Vault 3rd, 5.31 m (17 ft 5 in); Decathlon 2nd, 7349 points	Decathlon 5th, 7677 points
2017 Junior	Pole Vault 1st, 5.49 m (18 ft 0 in)	Pole Vault 4th, 5.50 m (18 ft 1 in)	4x400 3:13.76 9th Long Jump 7.30 m (23 ft 11 in) 9th	Decathlon 14th, 7455 points
2018 Senior	Pole Vault 17th, NH @ 5.23 m (17 ft 2 in)	Pole Vault 11th, 5.40 m (17 ft 9 in)	4x400 11th, 3:11.48; Long Jump 9th, 7.30 m (23 ft 11 in); Pole Vault 1st, 5.41 m (17 ft 9 in)	Decathlon 6th, 7736 points

== Professional ==
Ehrhardt began competing for Santa Barbara Track Club in Santa Barbara, California under coach Josh Priester in Fall 2018.

Ehrhardt placed third at 2019 Bryan Clay Invitational Decathlon 4th group at Azusa Pacific University setting a lifetime best mark scoring 8066 points.

representing United States
2018	Thorpe Cup	Decathlon	Ottawa, Canada	7th	7647 points
2016	Pan American Combined Events Cup	Decathlon	Knoxville, Tennessee	19th	6060 points
Year	US National Championship	Event	Venue	Place	Time
2019	2019 USA Indoor Track and Field Championships	Heptathlon	Ocean Breeze Athletic Complex	1st	5868 points
2018	2018 USA Outdoor Track and Field Championships	Decathlon	Drake Stadium (Drake University)	13th	6950 points
2016	USA Olympic Trials Track and Field Championships	Decathlon	Hayward Field Eugene, Oregon	T-17th	DNF
