= Don Schulze =

American baseball player (born 1962)

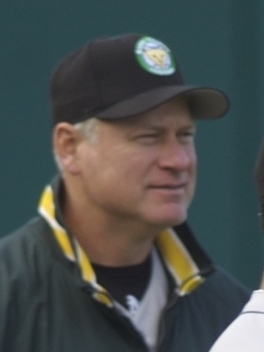
- Pitcher
- Born: September 27, 1962 (age 63); Roselle, Illinois, U.S.
- Batted: Right Threw: Right

MLB debut
- September 13, 1983, for the Chicago Cubs

Last MLB appearance
- September 29, 1989, for the San Diego Padres

MLB statistics
- Win–loss record: 15–25
- Earned run average: 5.47
- Strikeouts: 144

NPB statistics
- Win–loss record: 12–11
- Earned run average: 3.39
- Strikeouts: 112
- Stats at Baseball Reference

Teams
- Chicago Cubs (1983–1984); Cleveland Indians (1984–1986); New York Mets (1987); New York Yankees (1989); San Diego Padres (1989); Orix Braves / BlueWave (1990–1992)

Donald Arthur Schulze (born September 27, 1962) is an American former professional baseball pitcher and current minor league pitching coach.

Schulze graduated from Lake Park High School in 1981. He pitched all or part of six seasons in the majors, between 1983 and 1989, for the Chicago Cubs, Cleveland Indians, New York Mets, New York Yankees, and San Diego Padres. He also pitched three seasons in Japan: from 1990 until 1992 for the Orix BlueWave. He currently serves as the pitching coach for the Lansing Lugnuts.

Since 2006, Schulze has worked in the Oakland Athletics organization as a pitching coach. He was with the Arizona League Athletics in 2006, the Kane County Cougars in 2007 to 2008, and the Stockton Ports in 2009 to 2010. In November 2010, he was named to the staff of the Midland RockHounds. He was moved to the Beloit Snappers for the 2018 and 2019 seasons, and to the Lugnuts from 2021 onward. In 2026, he was named as an assistant pitching coach for the Las Vegas Aviators the Triple-A affiliate of the Athletics.

== Sources ==
- Career statistics from MLB · ESPN · Baseball Reference · Fangraphs · Baseball Reference (Minors) · Retrosheet · Baseball Almanac, or Retrosheet
