= Itasca station =

Commuter rail station in Itasca, Illinois

Itasca

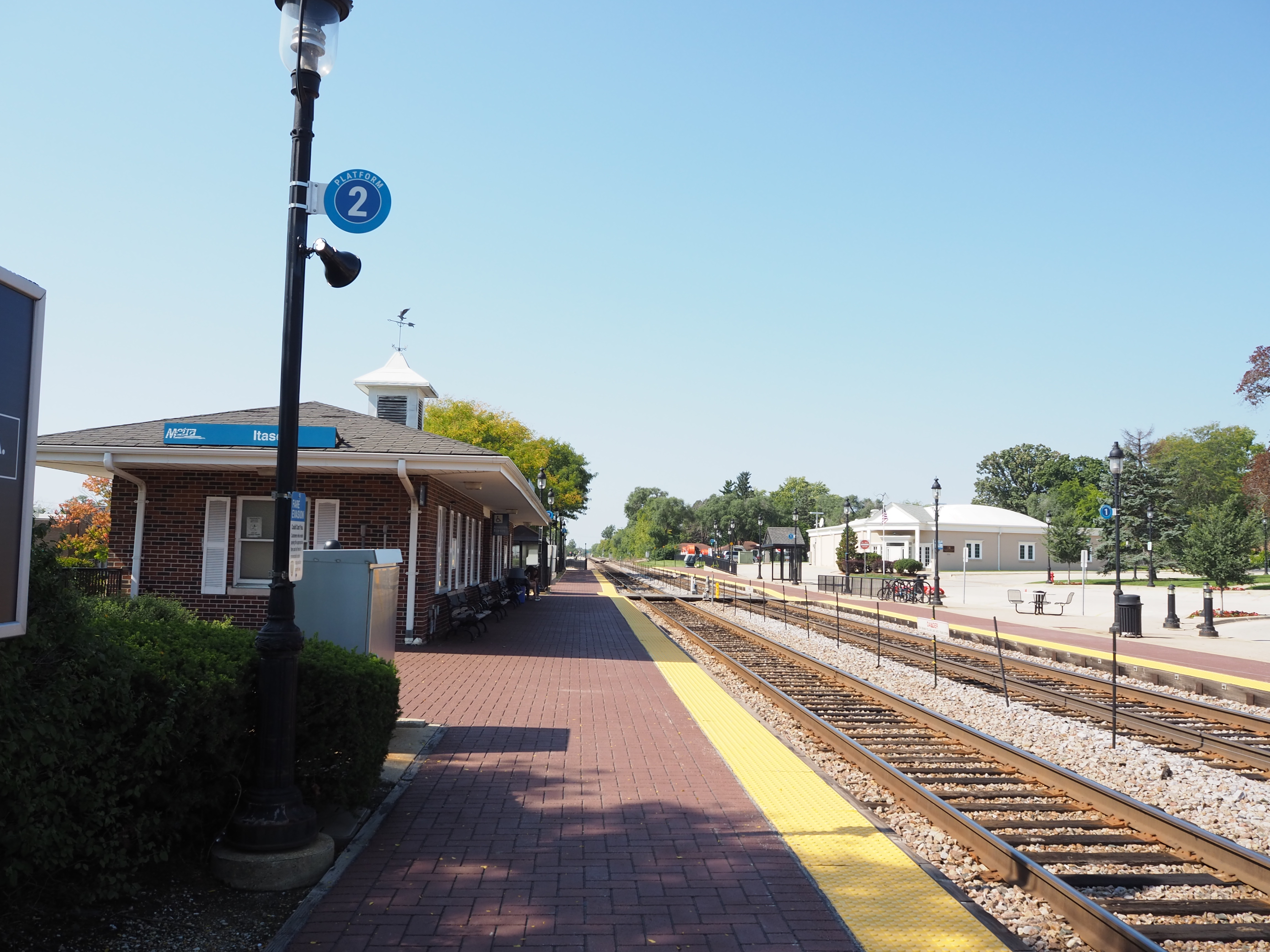
- Itasca station in September 2023

General information
- Location: Irving Park Road and Maple Street; Itasca, Illinois 60143
- Coordinates: 41.9715°N 88.0141°W
- Owner: Metra
- Line: Elgin Subdivision
- Platforms: 2 side platforms
- Tracks: 2
- Connections: Pace Bus

Construction
- Parking: Yes
- Accessible: Yes

Other information
- Fare zone: 3

History
- Opened: 1890
- Rebuilt: 1946

Passengers
- 2018: 555 (average weekday) ▼7.7%
- Rank: 91 out of 236

Services
Preceding station	Metra	Following station
Medinah toward Big Timber/Elgin	Milwaukee District West	Wood Dale toward Union Station
Former services
Preceding station	Milwaukee Road	Following station
Medinah toward Elgin	Suburban Service West Line	Wooddale toward Chicago
Track layout
Location

Itasca is a station on Metra's Milwaukee District West Line in Itasca, Illinois. The station is 21.0 miles (33.8 km) away from Chicago Union Station, the eastern terminus of the line. In Metra's zone-based fare system, Itasca is in zone 3. As of 2018, Itasca is the 91st busiest of Metra's 236 non-downtown stations, with an average of 555 weekday boardings.

As of February 15, 2024, Itasca is served by 42 trains (20 inbound, 22 outbound) on weekdays, by all 24 trains (12 in each direction) on Saturdays, and by all 18 trains (nine in each direction) on Sundays and holidays.

Itasca station is located near the Itasca Country Club. Daily parking is available for $1.50 per day along the south side of the tracks along Irving Park Road near Willow Street, and Schiller Street between 1st and Rush Streets. Permit parking is on the north side of the tracks on the corner of Orchard and Maple Streets. Permits are on a three-month basis and cost $50 for residents of Itasca and $75 for non-residents.

== Gallery ==
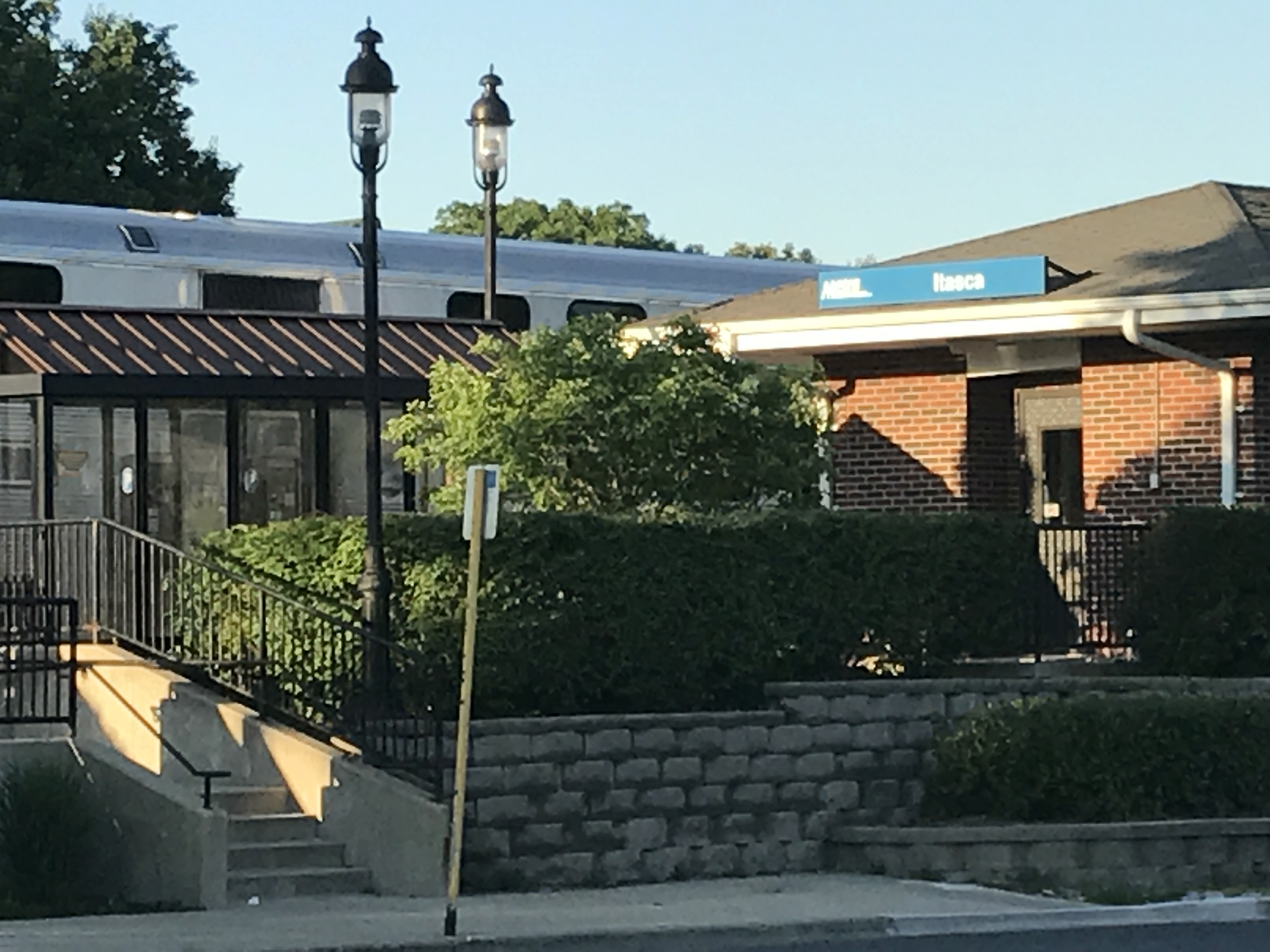
An outbound train at the Itasca Metra station as viewed from across Irving Park Road.

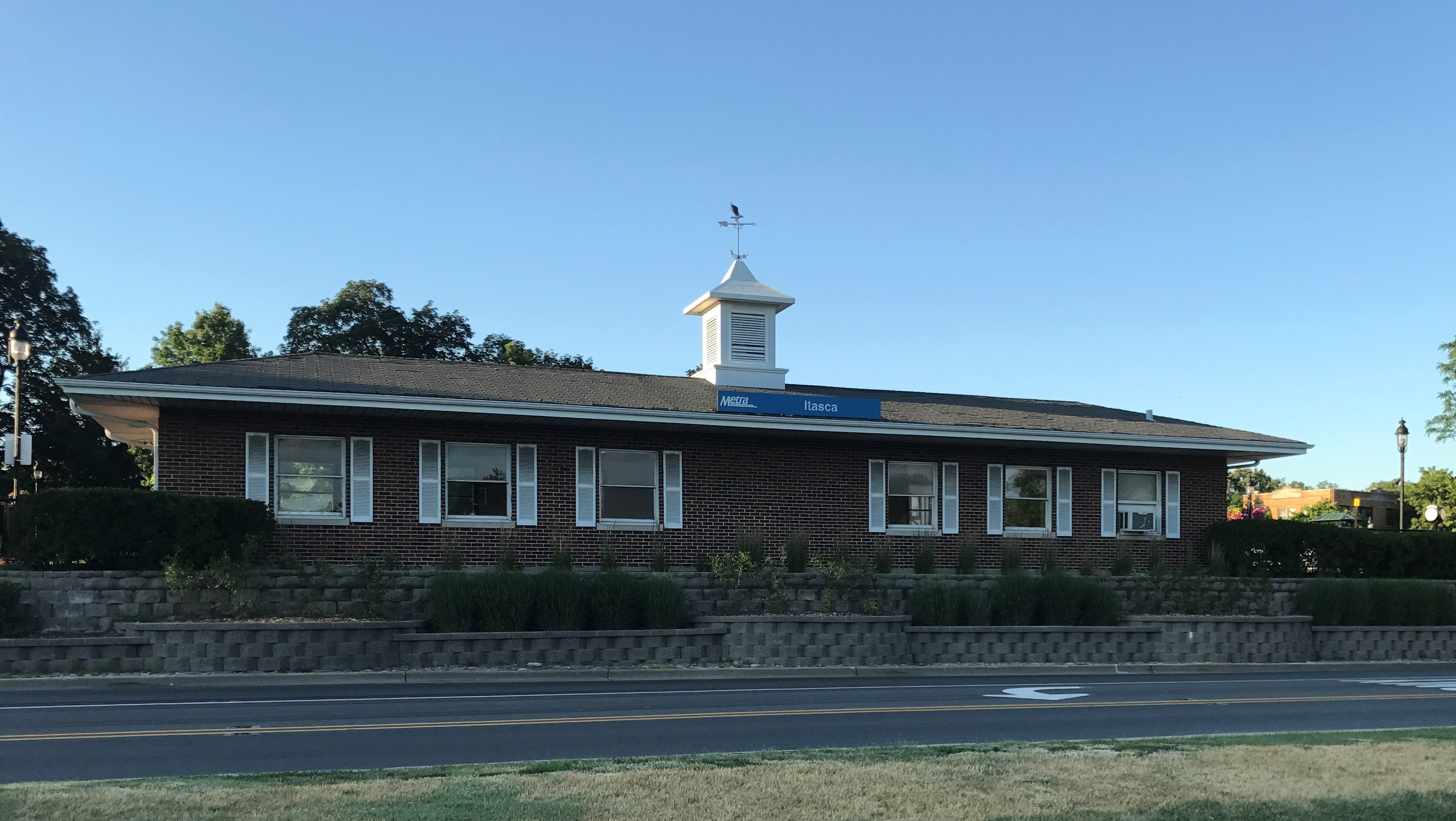
The south side of the Itasca Metra station as viewed from across Irving Park Road.

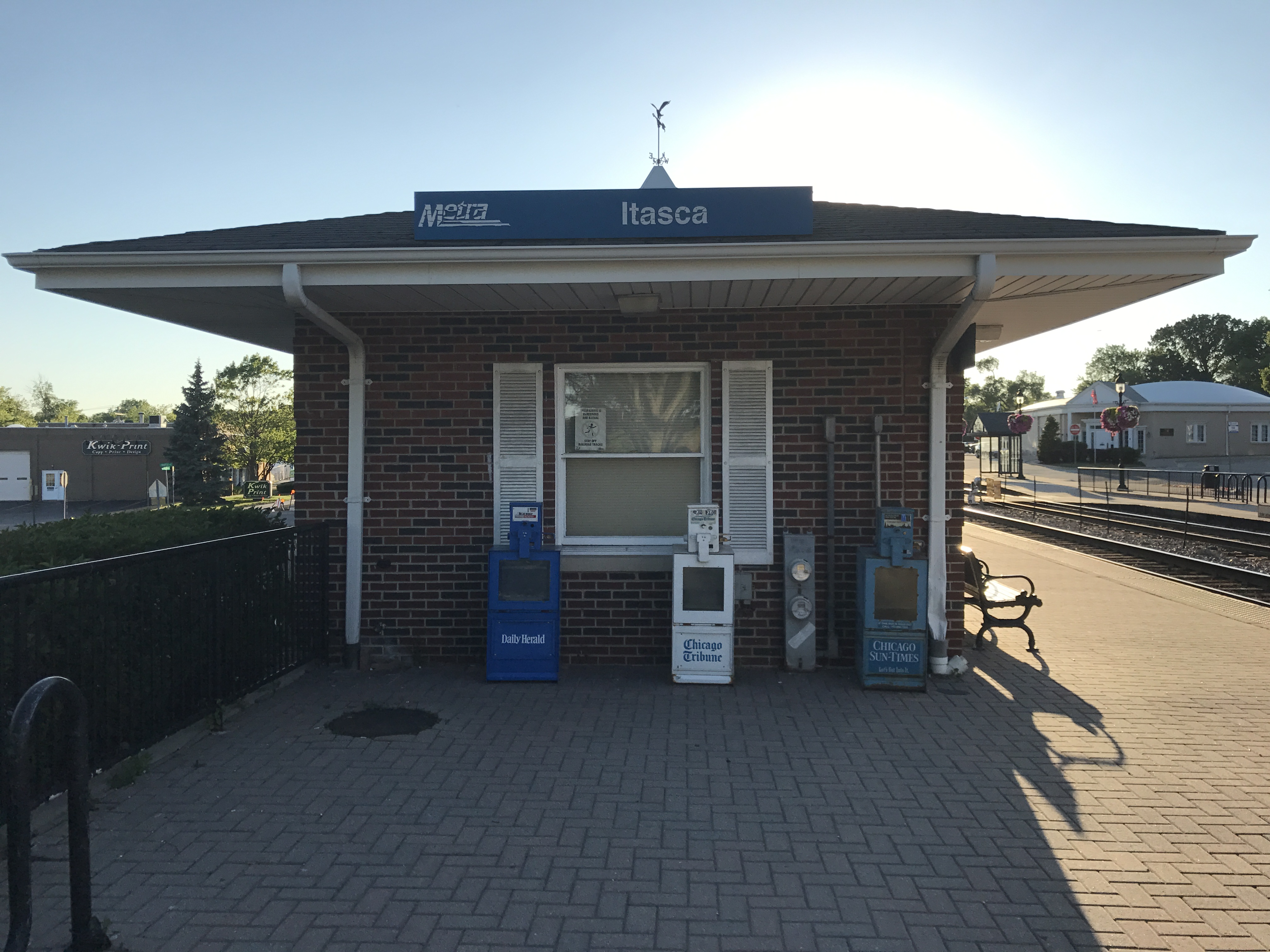
The east side of the Itasca Metra station.

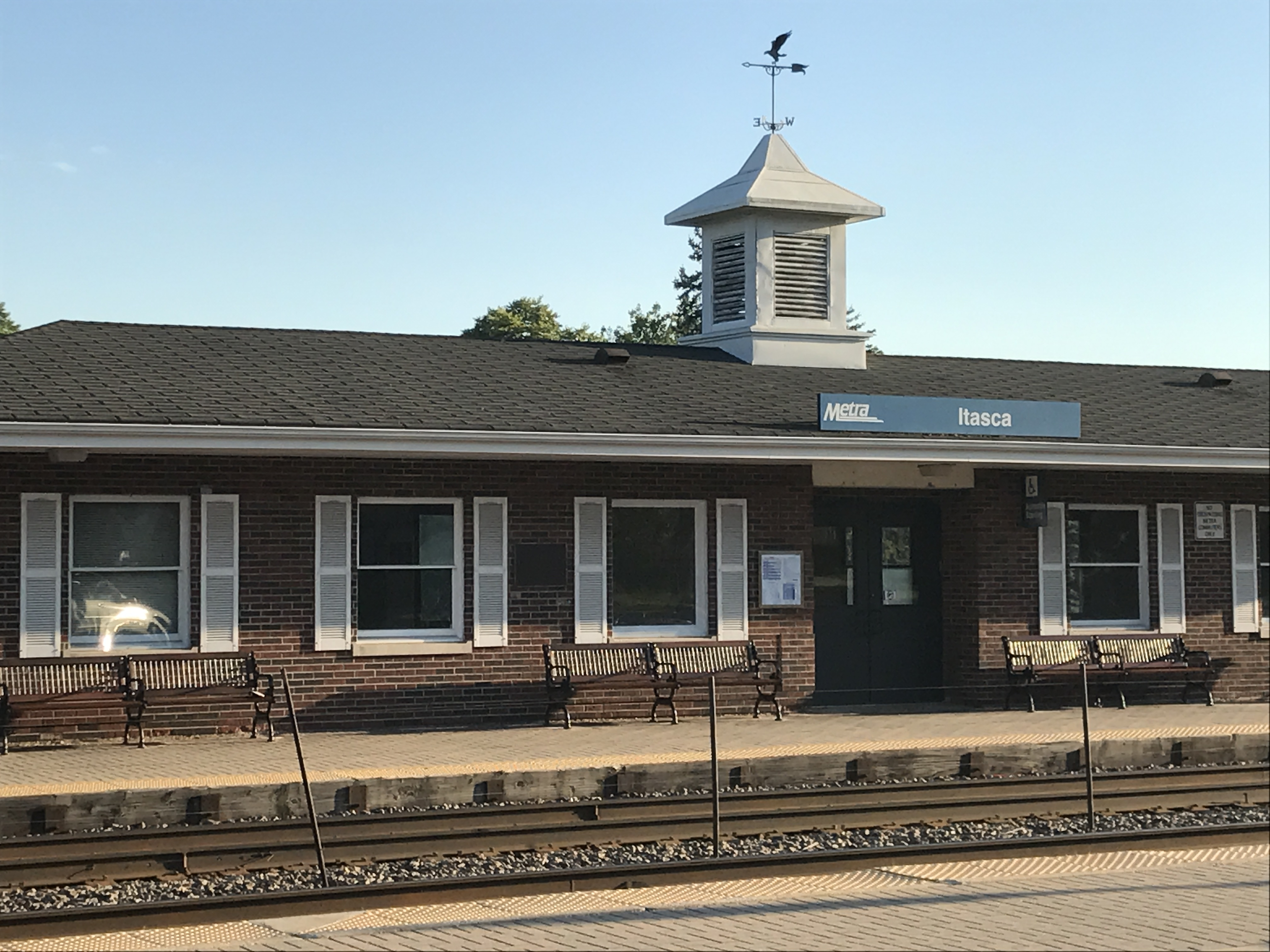
The north side of the Itasca Metra station as viewed from across Orchard Street.

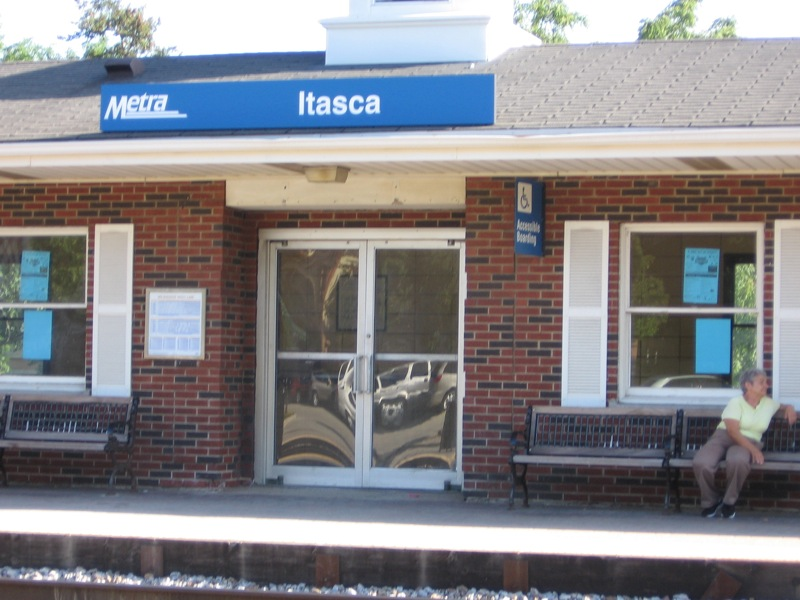
The north side of the Itasca Metra station as viewed from across Orchard Street
