= Medinah station =

Commuter rail station in Medinah, Illinois

Medinah

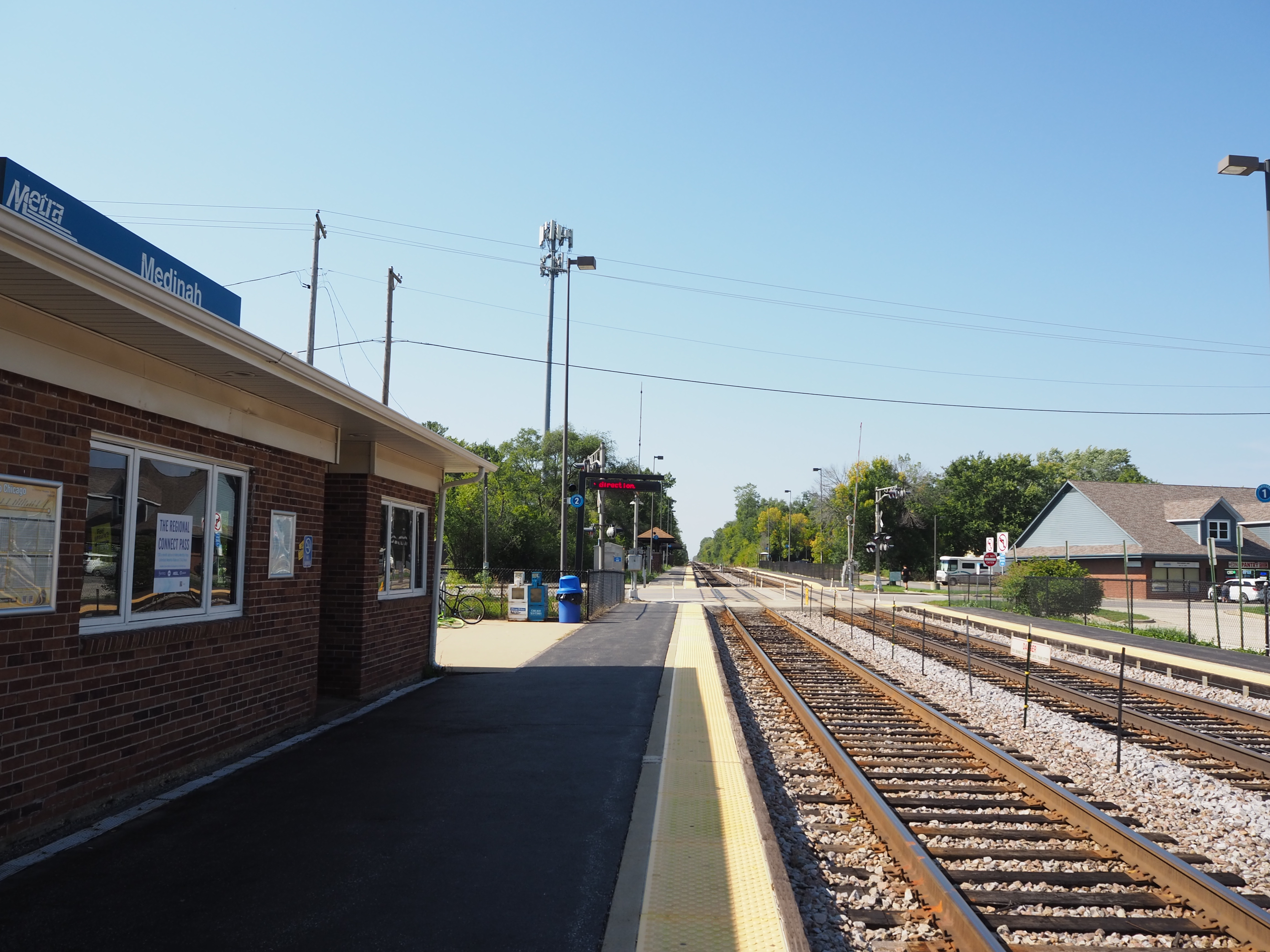
- Medinah station in September 2023

General information
- Location: Medinah Road, north of IL Route 19; Medinah, Illinois 60157
- Coordinates: 41.9782°N 88.0510°W
- Owner: Metra
- Line: Elgin Subdivision
- Platforms: 2 side platforms
- Tracks: 2

Construction
- Parking: Yes
- Accessible: Yes

Other information
- Fare zone: 3

History
- Opened: 1959

Passengers
- 2018: 439 (average weekday) ▼23.4%
- Rank: 110 out of 236

Services
Preceding station	Metra	Following station
Roselle toward Big Timber/Elgin	Milwaukee District West	Itasca toward Union Station
Former services
Preceding station	Milwaukee Road	Following station
Roselle toward Elgin	Suburban Service West Line	Itasca toward Chicago
Track layout
Location

Medinah is a station on Metra's Milwaukee District West Line in Medinah, Illinois. The station is 23 miles (37 km) away from Chicago Union Station, the eastern terminus of the line. In Metra's zone-based fare system, Medinah is in zone 3. As of 2018, Medinah is the 110th busiest of Metra's 236 non-downtown stations, with an average of 439 weekday boardings.

As of February 15, 2024, Medinah is served by 43 trains (21 inbound, 22 outbound) on weekdays, by all 24 trains (12 in each direction) on Saturdays, and by all 18 trains (nine in each direction) on Sundays and holidays.
