= Roselle station =

Commuter rail station in Illinois

Roselle

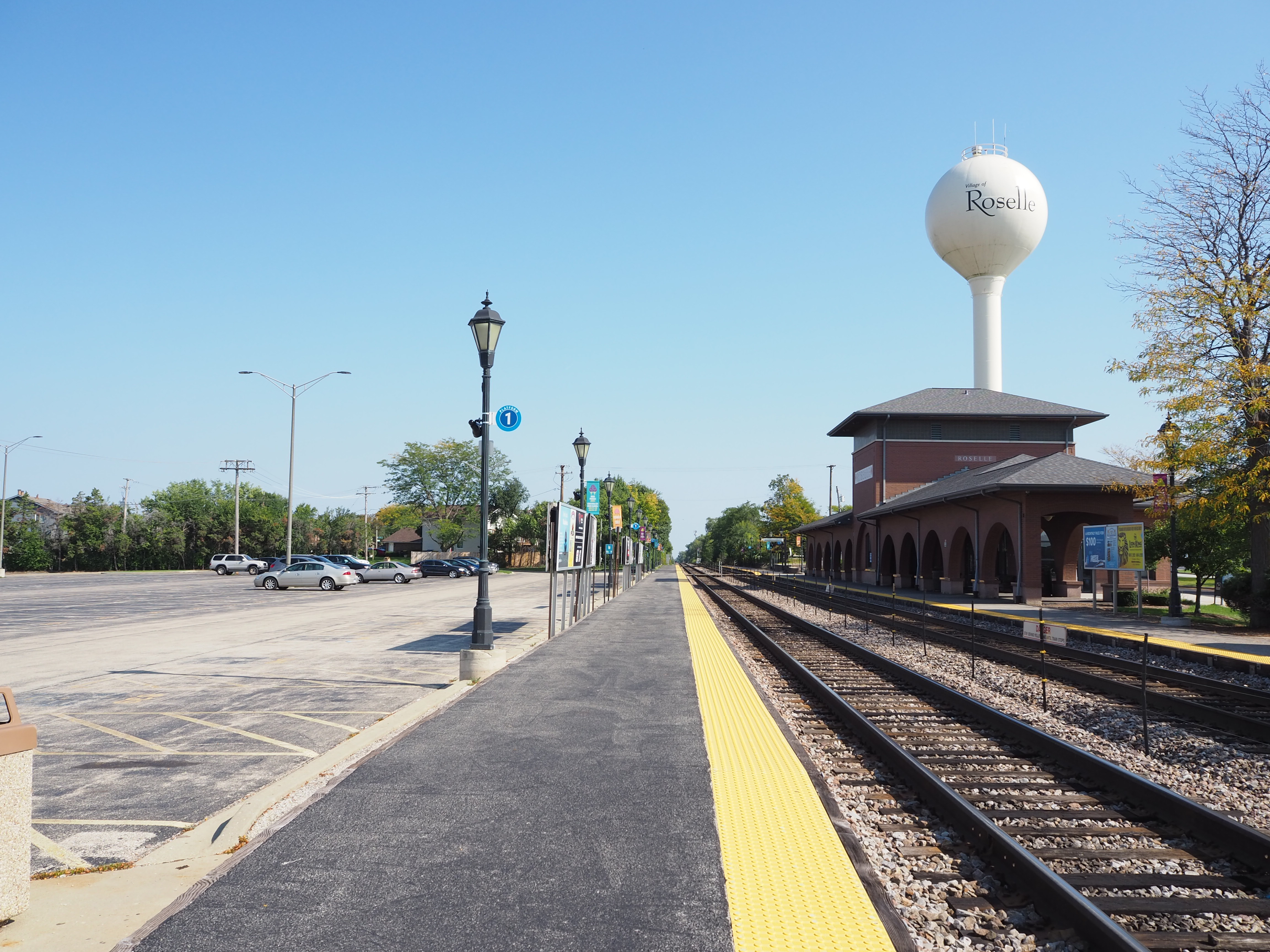
- The station platforms in September 2023

General information
- Location: 540 Irving Park Road (IL 19), Roselle, Illinois 60172
- Coordinates: 41.9814°N 88.0672°W
- Owner: Metra
- Line: Elgin Subdivision
- Platforms: 2 side platforms
- Tracks: 2

Construction
- Parking: Yes; vendor service
- Accessible: Yes

Other information
- Fare zone: 4

History
- Opened: 1971
- Rebuilt: 2002

Passengers
- 2018: 1,448 (average weekday) ▼0.5%
- Rank: 24 out of 236

Services
| Preceding station | Metra | Following station |
|---|---|---|
| Schaumburg toward Big Timber/Elgin | Milwaukee District West | Medinah toward Union Station |
Former services
| Preceding station | Milwaukee Road | Following station |
|---|---|---|
| Ontarioville toward Elgin | Suburban Service West Line | Medinah toward Chicago |
Track layout
Location

Roselle is a station on Metra's Milwaukee District West Line in Roselle, Illinois. The station is 23.9 miles (38.5 km) away from Chicago Union Station, the eastern terminus of the line. In Metra's zone-based fare system, Roselle is in zone 4. As of 2018, Roselle is the 24th busiest of Metra's 236 non-downtown stations, with an average of 1,448 weekday boardings.

As of February 15, 2024, Roselle is served by 46 trains (23 in each direction) on weekdays, by all 24 trains (12 in each direction) on Saturdays, and by all 18 trains (nine in each direction) on Sundays and holidays.

This station was constructed in 1971 to replace the original station built in 1873 located four blocks west at the between Park Street and Prospect Street. The depot building was rebuilt in 2002.
