= Illinois Route 19 =

State highway in northeastern Illinois, US

Illinois Route 19
- IL 19 highlighted in red

Route information
- Maintained by IDOT and CDOT
- Length: 33.64 mi (54.14 km)
- Existed: 1949–present

Major junctions
- West end: IL 25 in Elgin
- IL 390 Toll in Schaumburg; US 12 / US 45 in Schiller Park; Future I-490 in Bensenville; I-294 Toll in Schiller Park; I-90 / I-94 in Chicago
- East end: US 41 in Chicago

Location
- Country: United States
- State: Illinois
- Counties: Kane, Cook, DuPage

Highway system
- Illinois State Highway System; Interstate; US; State; Tollways; Scenic
← IL 18	→ US 20

Illinois Route 19 (abbreviated IL-19, or simply Illinois 19) is a major east–west arterial state highway in northeastern Illinois, United States. It runs from Illinois Route 25 (Liberty St.) in Elgin, to Lake Shore Drive (U.S. Route 41) on the north side of Chicago. Illinois 19 is 33.64 miles (54.14 km) long. From its western terminus to Schaumburg Road in Elgin, it's known as Chicago Street before becoming Irving Park Road until its eastern terminus.

== Route description ==
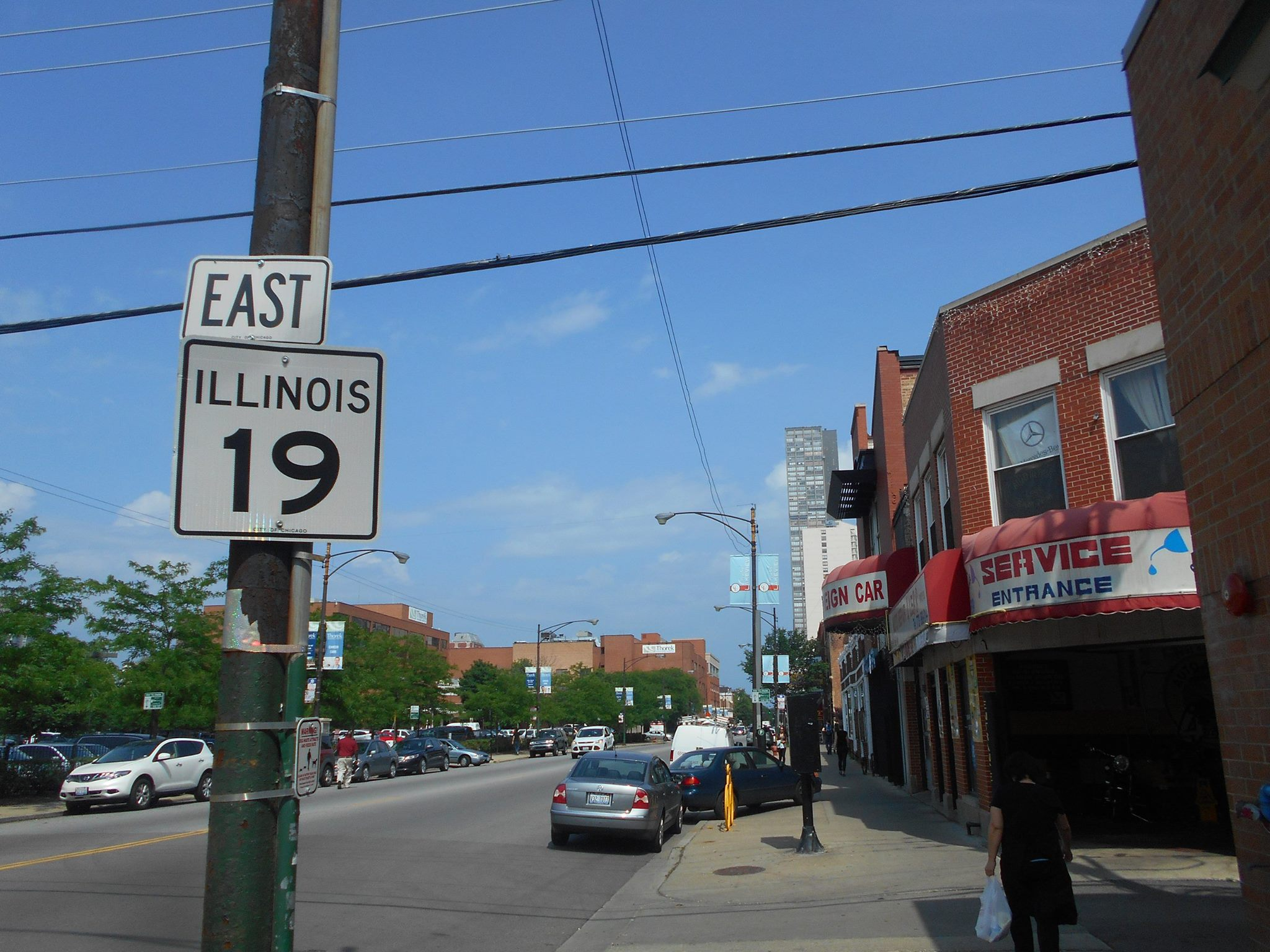
IL 19 eastbound approaching the junction with US 41

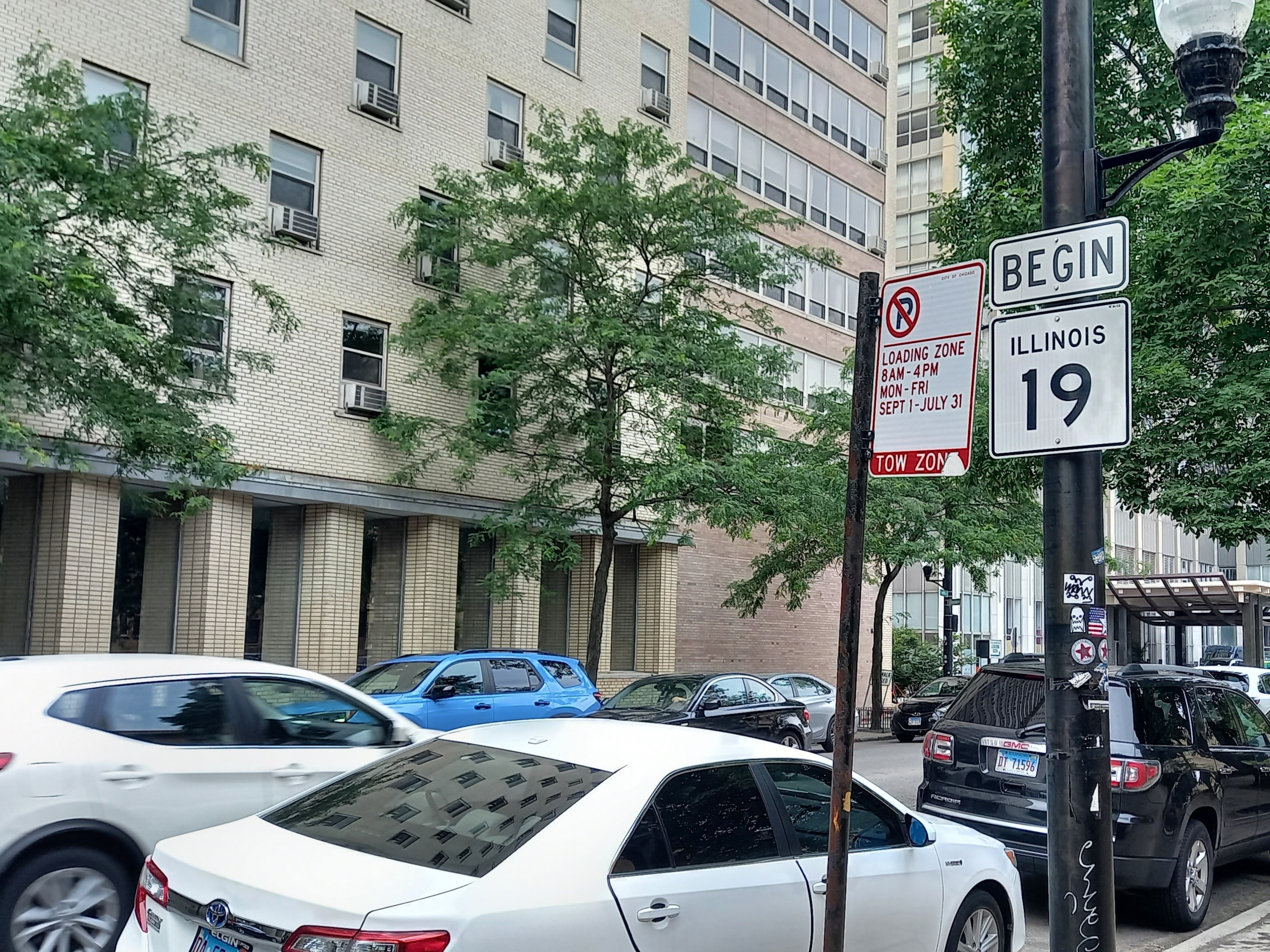
Begin IL 19 sign, taken just west of US 41

Illinois 19 fluctuates from being a two lane road in rural parts to six lanes by highway interchanges. In Elgin, the road is mostly four lanes, narrowing to two in relatively undeveloped, forested sections between Illinois Route 59 and Elgin. East of Barrington Road, the road becomes a main artery through the western suburbs of Chicago. The Elgin-O'Hare Expressway (now known as Illinois Route 390) was built in part to reduce traffic on Illinois 19 through Roselle and Itasca.

The road narrows from six to two lanes between Schaumburg and Roselle, and again (from four lanes to two) in Medinah and through Itasca. The road then becomes four lanes in Wood Dale and maintains this width to its eastern terminus, except for a narrower stretch between N. Cumberland Avenue (Illinois 171) and N. Austin Avenue in Chicago.

East of Bensenville Illinois 19 becomes one of only seven state highways to enter the city of Chicago. It passes along the current southern border of O'Hare International Airport and serves as the main gateway for western suburbs to access the airport.

At the Tri-State Tollway in Schiller Park, traffic on Illinois 19 may enter the northbound lanes of the tollway. Traffic wishing to enter the southbound lanes must enter at Balmoral (via Mannheim) or Interstate 190 to the north. The Chicago city limits officially start at the Des Plaines River. Illinois 19 runs through the O'Hare, Dunning, Portage Park, Irving Park, North Center and Lake View neighborhoods before ending at a traffic signal beneath Lake Shore Drive (U.S. Route 41).

In Elgin, it intersects with Shales Parkway providing access to Illinois Route 58 and U.S. Route 20.

The road used to be named Chicago-Elgin Road, but east of Elgin it has been renamed Irving Park Road, for the Irving Park neighborhood of Chicago located between Cicero Avenue and the north branch of the Chicago River in Chicago. In Elgin itself, it has since been renamed East Chicago Street. As of 2005, some signage on approaching streets still identified Irving Park Road as Chicago-Elgin Road.

== History ==
The original Route 19 was designated in 1918 as what is now U.S. Route 14 from Chicago Loop to Harvard. In 1935, the routing was removed, and in 1949 it was reapplied on part of its modern-day routing. As of 1968, IL 72 was cut back from Lake Shore Drive (US 41) to its present terminus. As a result, the IL 19 designation was extended from its terminus at Narragansett Avenue (formerly assigned as part of IL 72) by 7 miles (11 km) to Lake Shore Drive in Chicago.

=== O'Hare realignment ===
Irving Park Road once ran straight through where O'Hare International Airport's 04R/22L Runway now sits. The road was realigned to the south in the 1960s in order to build the runway. Again in 2012, the road was realigned to the south as part of the O'Hare Modernization Plan to build runway 10R/28L.

=== Wood Dale proposed underpass ===
On November 16, 2006, aldermen in Wood Dale approved a plan to redesign the intersection of Irving Park Road and Wood Dale Road. The intersection is currently fully interconnected to railroad signals for the active Metra Milwaukee District West Line tracks, creating a situation where vehicles on both roads may be at risk of being hit by oncoming commuter trains. In addition, freight trains emerge from the Canadian Pacific Railway's Bensenville freight railroad yard during off peak rush hours. After the $45 million reconstruction, Irving Park Road would have crossed underneath the railroad tracks further northwest from the current intersection. Two alternatives were advanced in a city council meeting: Alternate 2, which would move Irving Park Road slightly north, displace 18 businesses but have flood-plain and line-of-sight issues, and Alternate 2A, which would displace 47 homes and 13 businesses.

The plan was killed in early March 2007 after local opposition to a Division Street extension through property owned by Holy Ghost Church. The city has since decided to investigate alternative safety measures at the intersection, including the addition of turn lanes and red-light cameras.

== Transportation ==
The CTA services the 80 Irving Park between Inner Drive and Cumberland Avenue. The 9 Ashland, X9 Ashland Express and 54A North Cicero/Skokie Blvd serve the road for short segments.

The following "L" and Metra lines service Irving Park Road:

- Red Line at Sheridan Road
- Brown Line at Ravenswood Avenue
- Blue Line at Kennedy Expressway
- Union Pacific Northwest Line at Irving Park
- Milwaukee District North Line at Grayland
- Milwaukee District West Line at Wood Dale, Itasca, Medinah, and Roselle

== Major intersections ==
County	Location	mi	km	Destinations	Notes
Kane	Elgin	0.00	0.00	IL 25 (Liberty Street)	Western terminus
Cook	Elgin	2.45	3.94	CR A66 east (Schaumburg Road)	Eastern terminus of Chicago Street; western terminus of Irving Park Road; southern terminus of Schaumburg Road
Cook	Streamwood	3.65	5.87	IL 59 (Sutton Road)	
Cook	Streamwood	4.67	7.52	CR V47 (Bartlett Road)	
Cook	Schaumburg–Hanover Park line	7.67	12.34	CR A69 (Wise Road)	
Cook	Schaumburg	8.47	13.63	IL 390 Toll (Elgin-O'Hare Tollway)	I-Pass only; IL 390 exit 7
DuPage	Roselle	10.13	16.30	CR 4 (Roselle Road)	
DuPage	Medinah	11.74	18.89	CR 24 (Medinah Road)	
DuPage	Itasca	13.16	21.18	IL 53 (Rohlwing Road)	
DuPage	Itasca	14.95	24.06	CR 10 north (Prospect Avenue)	
DuPage	Wood Dale	15.98	25.72	CR 28 (Wood Dale Road)	
DuPage	Bensenville	17.06	27.46	To IL 83 (Busse Road, Kingery Highway)	Access via Spruce Avenue and Marshall Road
DuPage	Bensenville	17.59	28.31	CR 8 north (York Road)	
DuPage	Bensenville			I-490 Toll (O'Hare Western Bypass)	Future Interchange
Cook	Schiller Park	20.90	33.64	US 12 / US 45 (Mannheim Road) to I-294 Toll south	Access to southbound I-294 via US 12/45 north
Cook	Schiller Park	21.23	34.17	I-294 Toll north (Tri-State Tollway) – Wisconsin	I-294 exit 38
Cook	Chicago	23.36	37.59	IL 171 (Cumberland Avenue)	
Cook	Chicago	24.88	40.04	IL 43 (Harlem Avenue)	
Cook	Chicago	27.97	45.01	IL 50 (Cicero Avenue) / Milwaukee Avenue	The Six Corners
Cook	Chicago	28.80	46.35	I-90 / I-94 (Kennedy Expressway)	I-94 exit 44
Cook	Chicago	31.41	50.55	CR W96 (Western Avenue)	
Cook	Chicago	32.41	52.16	CR W48 (Ashland Avenue)	
Cook	Chicago	33.64	54.14	US 41 / LMCT (Lake Shore Drive)	Eastern terminus; interchange
1.000 mi = 1.609 km; 1.000 km = 0.621 mi: Electronic toll collection; Incomplete access; Unopened
