= 1st Avenue (Chicago) =

North–south street in Chicago

1st Avenue (Cumberland Avenue)
- 8400 West; Thatcher Avenue
- Former name: Pueblo Avenue
- Part of: IL 171
- Length: 15.70 miles (25.27 km) (southern segment); 1.50 miles (2.41 km) (northern segment); 17.20 miles (27.68 km) (total)
- Location: Chicago
- South end: I-55 in Summit
- North end: Church Street in Niles

1st Avenue, also known as Cumberland Avenue and Thatcher Avenue for parts of its northern segment, is a north–south street in Chicago and its western suburbs. It marks 8400 West in the Chicago address system, being located ten and one-half miles west of State Street.

Its southern segment begins at an interchange with Interstate 55 (Stevenson Expressway) in Summit. At this point, it is called 1st Avenue and carries Illinois Route 171. In Lyons village, the road intersects U.S. Route 34 (Ogden Avenue). In North Riverside, 1st Avenue intersects 22nd Street. In Maywood, it intersects Roosevelt Road. 1st Avenue then intersects Interstate 290 (Eisenhower Expressway) in Maywood. While still in Maywood, 1st Avenue intersects Madison Street, crossing from the south side of the metropolitan area to the north side. Other streets that 1st Avenue intersects in Maywood are Lake Street and Chicago Avenue. In Melrose Park, 1st Avenue intersects Illinois Route 64 (North Avenue). In River Grove, the road intersects Fullerton Avenue and Grand Avenue. Between these two streets, 1st Avenue ends and continues as Thatcher Avenue, which splits to the southeast and continues until Hawthorne Avenue in River Forest. While still in River Grove, Thatcher Avenue intersects Belmont Avenue. It is at this point where Thatcher Avenue ends and Cumberland Avenue begins (the designation it will carry for the remainder of its routing). Next, Cumberland Avenue enters the city of Chicago and intersects the west end of Addison Street. Then, it intersects Illinois Route 19 (Irving Park Road). The next road Cumberland Avenue intersects is Montrose Avenue (at which it enters the village of Norridge), followed by Lawrence Avenue, and then Foster Avenue, re-entering Chicago a block past. Next, the road has an interchange with Interstate 90 (Kennedy Expressway). At the northernmost portion of the interchange, Cumberland Avenue intersects Illinois Route 72 (Higgins Road). Illinois Route 171 ends at this point as well. Further north into Park Ridge, the road intersects Devon Avenue and Touhy Avenue. The southern segment of Cumberland Avenue turns northwest upon meeting the Union Pacific Northwest Line in Park Ridge, and ends at an intersection with Clifton Avenue and Cedar Street.

Cumberland Avenue resumes at Oakton Street while still in Park Ridge. Continuing north into Niles, the road intersects U.S. Route 14 (Dempster Street). Cumberland Avenue continues north until ending at Church Street in Niles, near the Golf Mill Shopping Center.

In the '20s, Chicago annexed the area of 84th Av and under the Brennan street name system (K-L-M-N-O-P) renamed it "Pueblo". When Chicago replaced their street signs in the 1970s, they replaced the "Pueblo" signs with "Cumberland Av".

== Major Intersections ==
The entire route is in Cook County.

| Location | mi | km | Destinations | Notes |
|---|---|---|---|---|
| Summit | 0.0 | 0.0 | IL 171 south – Willow Springs, Joliet | Continuation beyond I-55 |
| Summit | 0.0 | 0.0 | I-55 (Stevenson Expressway) – Chicago, St. Louis | Southern terminus, I-55 exit 282 |
| McCook | 0.7 | 1.1 | Historic US 66 | Interchange, northbound exit and southbound entrance |
| McCook | 1.2 | 1.9 | 47th Street | Interchange |
| Lyons | 1.9 | 3.1 | US 34 (Ogden Avenue) | |
| Maywood | 5.9 | 9.5 | I-290 (Eisenhower Expressway) / IL 110 (CKC) – Chicago | I-290 exit 20 |
| Melrose Park | 8.4 | 13.5 | IL 64 (North Avenue) | |
| Chicago | 11.5 | 18.5 | IL 19 (Irving Park Road) | |
| Chicago | 13.7 | 22.0 | I-90 Toll (Kennedy Expressway) to I-190 west – Chicago, O'Hare, Rockford | I-90 exit 79 |
| Chicago–Park Ridge city line | 13.8 | 22.2 | IL 72 (Higgins Road) / IL 171 ends | Northern end of IL 171 concurrency |
| Park Ridge | 15.7 | 25.3 | Clifton Avenue | Continues as Cedar Street |
Gap in route
| Niles | 15.7 | 25.3 | Oakton Street | |
| Niles | 16.7 | 26.9 | US 14 (Dempster Street) | |
| Niles | 17.2 | 27.7 | Church Street | Northern terminus |
1.000 mi = 1.609 km; 1.000 km = 0.621 mi: Concurrency terminus
