= Lynfred Winery =

Winery in Illinois

- Location: Roselle, Illinois, United States 41°59′00″N 88°04′46″W
- Founded: 1979
- Distribution: Statewide
- Website: lynfredwinery.com

Lynfred Winery is a winery in Roselle, Illinois. It is the oldest, continuously operating family winery in Illinois.

== History ==
Lynfred Winery was founded on October 14, 1979, by Fred and Lynn Koehler. They started in a restored 1912 house in Roselle, Illinois, and began selling wine produced from California grapes out of the cellar in 1975. In 1985, their 1983 Chardonnay was awarded "Double Gold" at the National Restaurant Show in Chicago and won an award at the National Wine Competition for Chardonnays in Reno, Nevada. To meet demand, Lynfred opened a new winery in 1990, allowing them to produce nearly 100,000 US gallons (380,000 L; 83,000 imp gal) of wine per year.

In 1999, Lynfred opened Tasting deVine as a satellite store in Wheaton; a second location opened in Naperville in 2004. Lynfred also operates two tasting rooms; Wheeling, which opened in 2008, and Highland Park, which opened in 2022. Since 2002, Lynfred has run a bed and breakfast at their original location.

== Key People ==
Lynfred’s General Manager and Director of Winemaking is Andres Basso. Andres, born and raised in Chile, pursues the creation of premier wines in a wide variety of styles with fruits from the best producers in the United States, including California, Washington, Michigan and Illinois among others. To Lynfred, Andres brought experience gained in Chile with well-known companies Santa Rita and Concha y Toro following his graduation from the Universidad de Chile, followed by stints in Napa Valley (CA) at Merryvale and Columbia Valley (WA) at Gordon Brothers, as well as with Tarara Winery in northern Virginia. These experiences have provided him with a rich hands-on background and have blended with his gifted talent for tasting and sensory perception to form his personal signature in winemaking. Ultimately, the best fruit, cared for under the best conditions in the cellar transforms into a supreme delight when processed, aged and blended in his signature style and is unique to the Midwest.

Lynfred's Head Winemaker is Rodrigo Gonzalez. Rodrigo, a graduate of the University of Chile with a degree in Winemaking and a member of the Chilean College of Enologists, gained the majority of his experience as the Winemaker at Cremaschi Furlotti, located in Chile's Maule wine-growing region. Previously he worked at Casa Lapostolle and Viña Carmen, also in Chile.

At Cremaschi, many of Rodrigo’s wines garnered prestigious international medals. His skills captured international attention by winning a “Great Gold Medal” from "Concours Mondial de Bruxelless 2013" for his 2011 Single Vineyard Carmenere.
