= Wood Dale station =

Commuter rail station in Wood Dale, Illinois

Wood Dale

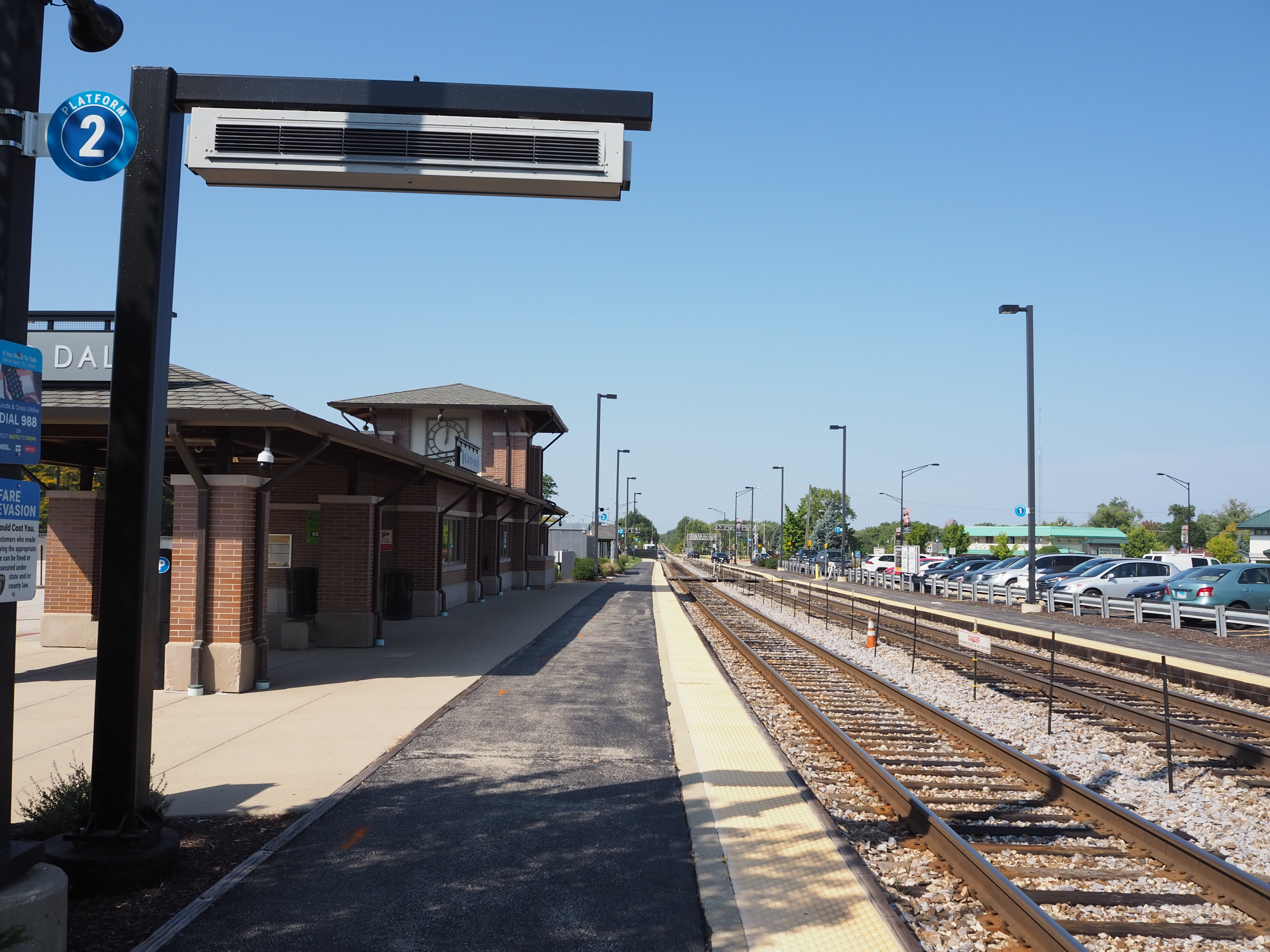
- Wood Dale station in September 2023

General information
- Location: 199 Division Street; Wood Dale, Illinois
- Coordinates: 41.9624°N 87.9752°W
- Owner: Metra
- Line: Elgin Subdivision
- Platforms: 2 side platforms
- Tracks: 2

Construction
- Accessible: Yes

Other information
- Fare zone: 3

History
- Opened: 1930
- Rebuilt: 1946, 2012

Passengers
- 2018: 596 (average weekday) ▼4.5%
- Rank: 83 out of 236

Services
Preceding station	Metra	Following station
Itasca toward Big Timber/Elgin	Milwaukee District West	Bensenville toward Union Station
Former services
Preceding station	Milwaukee Road	Following station
Itasca toward Elgin	Suburban Service West Line	Bensenville toward Chicago
Track layout
Location

Wood Dale is a station on Metra's Milwaukee District West Line in Wood Dale, Illinois. The station is 19.1 miles (30.7 km) away from Chicago Union Station, the eastern terminus of the line. In Metra's zone-based fare system, Wood Dale is in zone 3. As of 2018, Wood Dale is the 83rd busiest of Metra's 236 non-downtown stations, with an average of 596 weekday boardings.

As of February 15, 2024, Wood Dale is served by 42 trains (20 inbound, 22 outbound) on weekdays, by all 24 trains (12 in each direction) on Saturdays, and by all 18 trains (nine in each direction) on Sundays and holidays.

== History ==
The station was opened in 1930. Sixteen years later, the station was rebuilt. In 1992, Metra funded a 149 space expansion of the commuter parking lot. That same year, the station became part of the first Pace bus route to be subsidized by Metra. In 2004, a man was struck and killed near the station while trying to take a shortcut to work. In 2009, the city began construction of a new station as part of a larger transit-oriented development strategy. The new prairie style station was completed in 2012.

== Gallery ==
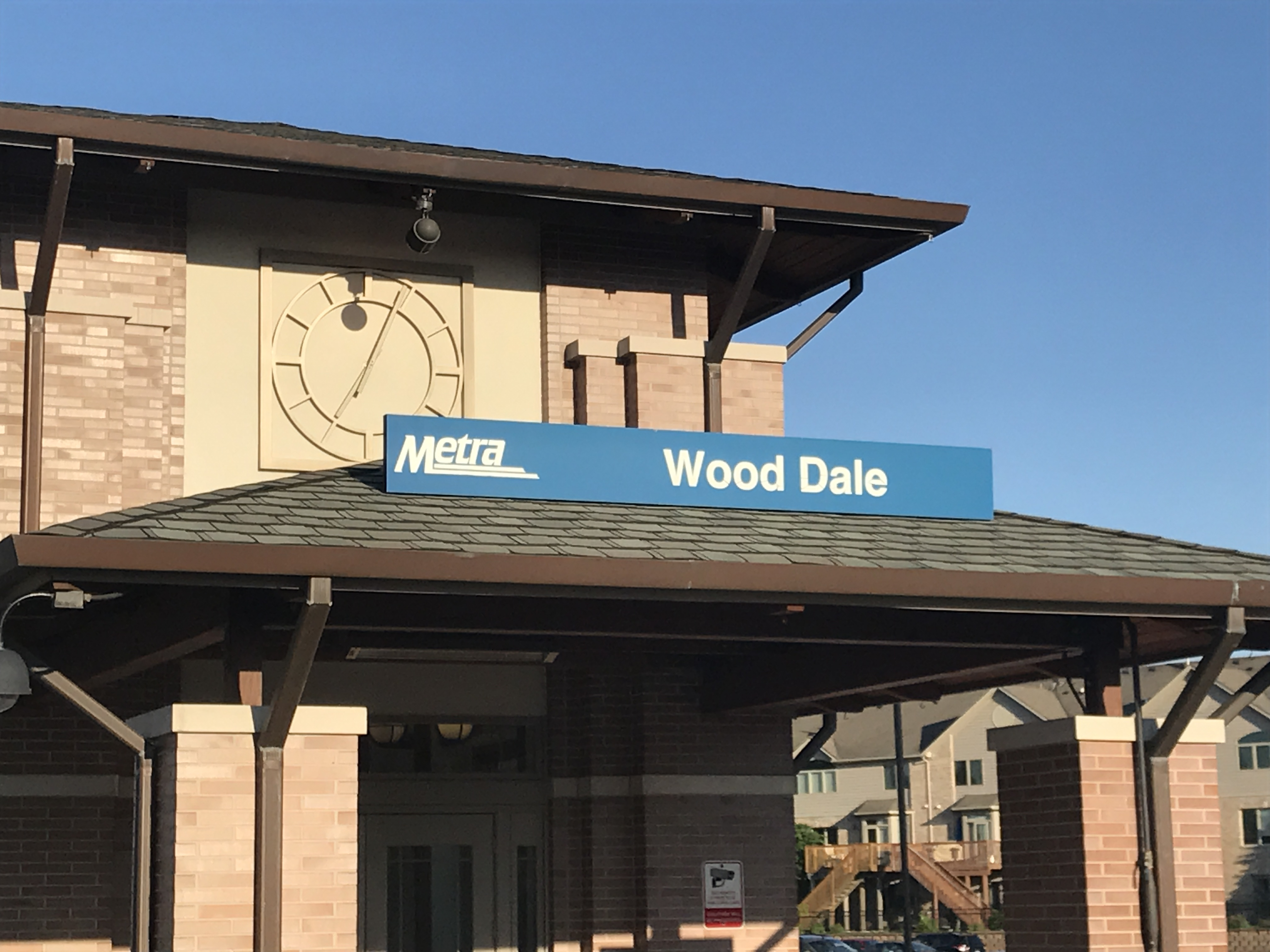
The west entrance of the Wood Dale Metra station.

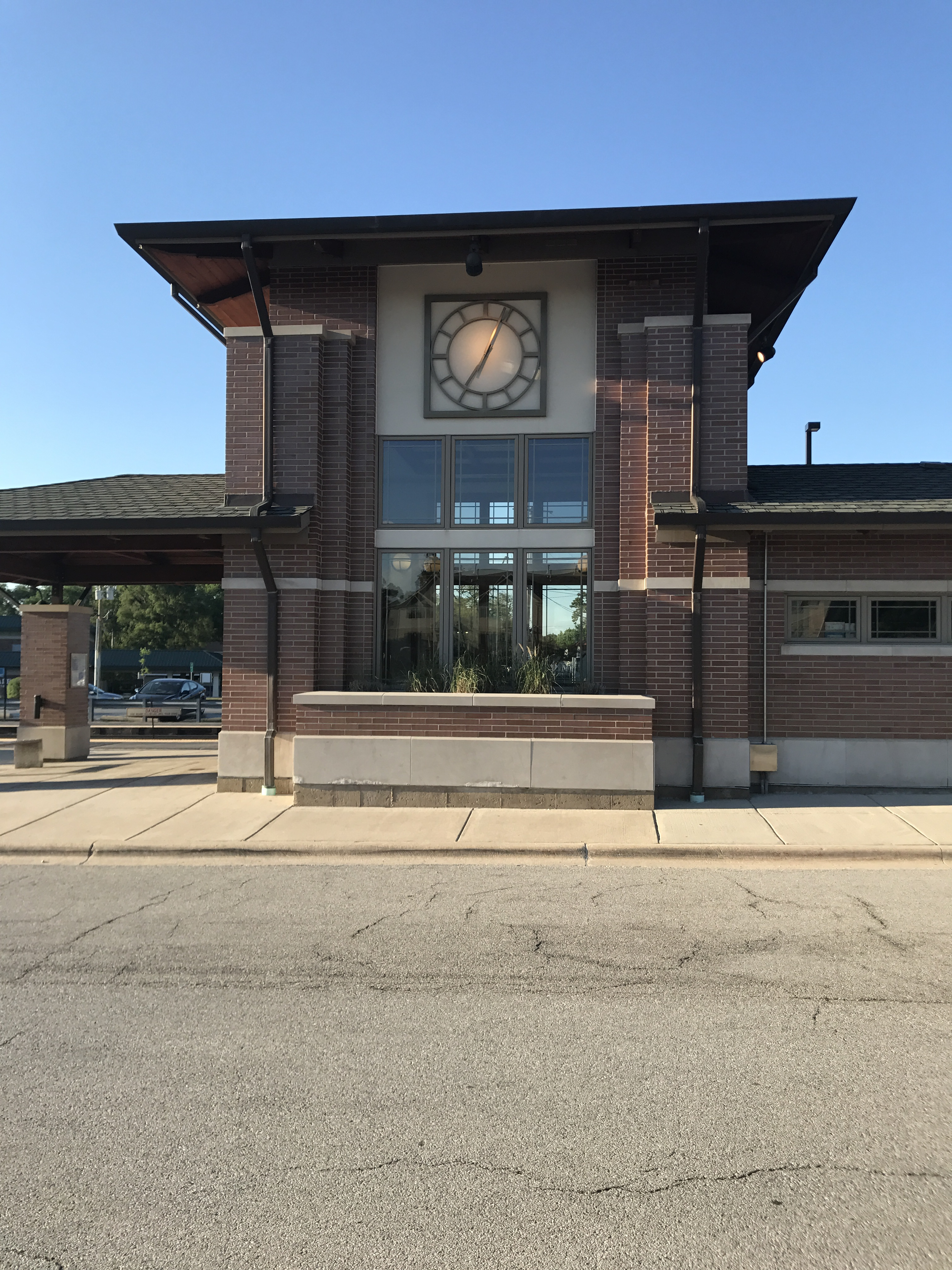
The clock tower of the Wood Dale station.

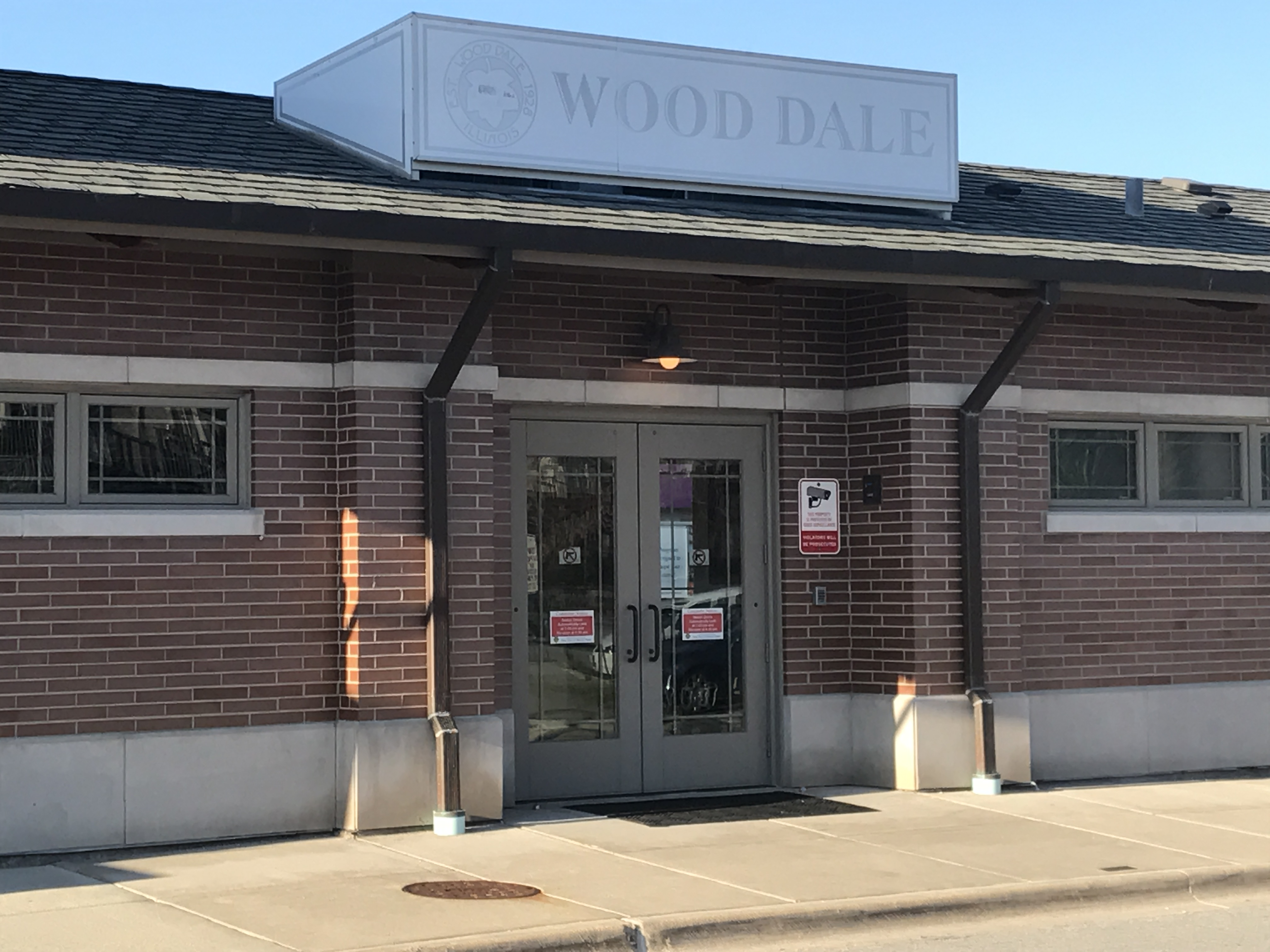
The south side entrance of the Wood Dale station.
