= Roselle, Illinois =

- Village
- Seal
- Motto: "Tradition Meets Tomorrow"
- Location of Roselle in DuPage County, Illinois.
- Coordinates: 41°58′57″N 88°05′08″W
- Country: United States
- State: Illinois
- Counties: DuPage and Cook

Area
  - Total: 5.61 sq mi (14.52 km^{2})
  - Land: 5.53 sq mi (14.32 km^{2})
  - Water: 0.077 sq mi (0.20 km^{2})
- Elevation: 784 ft (239 m)

Population (2020)
  - Total: 22,897
  - Density: 4,141/sq mi (1,598.8/km^{2})
- Time zone: UTC−6 (CST)
  - Summer (DST): UTC−5 (CDT)
- ZIP code: 60172
- Area codes: 224, 630, and 847
- FIPS code: 17-65806
- GNIS feature ID: 2399122
- Website: www.roselle.il.us

Roselle is a suburb of Chicago and is a village located in both DuPage County and Cook in Illinois. Roselle was first incorporated in 1922 as a bedroom community, with its train stop attracting residents commuting to Chicago or nearby suburbs for their jobs. As of the 2025 census, the village's population was 22,756.

== History ==
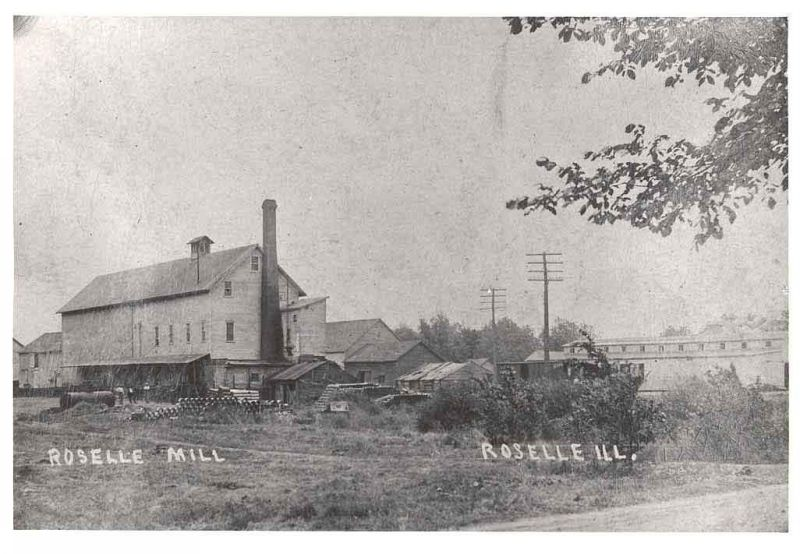
Roselle Flour and Feed Mill in 1895, before it burned down in 1916

The area surrounding the current village of Roselle began to be settled in the early 1830s, as settlers moved in next to the native Potawatomi people. Silas L. Meacham and his brothers Harvey and Lyman settled the area now known as Bloomingdale Township. The government had been offering land in the area for around $1.25 / acre. In 1837, Deacon Elijah Hough and his wife settled in the Bloomingdale area, with his sons Oramel, Rosell [sic] and daughter Cornelia.

In 1868, at the age of 48, Rosell Hough returned from a career as an alderman and a businessman in Chicago, and saw that the area had become a farming center for corn and flax. He opened the Illinois Linen Company on the northwest corner off of what is now Roselle Road and Irving Park Road. Hough was also the president of the Chicago and Pacific Railroad Company. It is rumored that because of his position, he spent some money to alter a land survey to show that a railroad line should run through Roselle, Itasca and Wood Dale instead of Addison and Bloomingdale. The train schedule misprinted the name of the town on the rail line, giving Roselle its current name.

== Geography ==
According to the 2021 census gazetteer files, Roselle has a total area of 5.61 square miles (14.53 km^{2}), of which 5.53 square miles (14.32 km^{2}) (or 98.64%) is land and 0.08 square miles (0.21 km^{2}) (or 1.36%) is water. Two notable hydrological features are Goose Lake and Spring Creek, a tributary to the East Branch of the DuPage River. Turner Pond is a man-made pond located just north of the town center.

== Demographics ==
Historical population
Census	Pop.	Note	%±
1880	193		—
1930	807		—
1940	694		−14.0%
1950	1,038		49.6%
1960	3,581		245.0%
1970	6,207		73.3%
1980	17,034		174.4%
1990	20,819		22.2%
2000	23,115		11.0%
2010	22,763		−1.5%
2020	22,897		0.6%
U.S Decennial Census

=== Racial and ethnic composition ===
Roselle village, Illinois – Racial and ethnic composition Note: the US Census treats Hispanic/Latino as an ethnic category. This table excludes Latinos from the racial categories and assigns them to a separate category. Hispanics/Latinos may be of any race.
Race / Ethnicity (NH = Non-Hispanic)	Pop 2000	Pop 2010	Pop 2020	% 2000	% 2010	% 2020
White alone (NH)	19,578	17,885	16,551	84.70%	78.57%	72.28%
Black or African American alone (NH)	377	577	557	1.63%	2.53%	2.43%
Native American or Alaska Native alone (NH)	37	21	21	0.16%	0.09%	0.09%
Asian alone (NH)	1,679	2,058	2,422	7.26%	9.04%	10.58%
Pacific Islander alone (NH)	5	7	9	0.02%	0.03%	0.04%
Other race alone (NH)	11	11	80	0.05%	0.05%	0.35%
Mixed race or Multiracial (NH)	231	337	648	1.00%	1.48%	2.83%
Hispanic or Latino (any race)	1,197	1,867	2,609	5.18%	8.20%	11.39%
Total	23,115	22,763	22,897	100.00%	100.00%	100.00%

=== 2020 census ===
As of the 2020 census, Roselle had a population of 22,897. There were 6,134 families residing in the village.

There were 8,824 households and 9,102 housing units, with 3.1% of housing units vacant. The homeowner vacancy rate was 0.8% and the rental vacancy rate was 6.1%. The population density was 4,084.37 inhabitants per square mile (1,576.98/km^{2}), and housing unit density was 1,623.62 per square mile (626.88/km^{2}).

The median age was 41.5 years. 21.0% of residents were under the age of 18 and 16.3% of residents were 65 years of age or older. For every 100 females there were 93.8 males, and for every 100 females age 18 and over there were 92.4 males age 18 and over.

Of all households, 31.6% had children under the age of 18 living in them, 55.8% were married-couple households, 14.6% were households with a male householder and no spouse or partner present, and 24.0% were households with a female householder and no spouse or partner present. About 23.5% of all households were made up of individuals and 9.4% had someone living alone who was 65 years of age or older.

100.0% of residents lived in urban areas, while 0.0% lived in rural areas.

=== Income and poverty ===
The median income for a household in the village was $92,470, and the median income for a family was $107,719. Males had a median income of $60,901 versus $41,015 for females. The per capita income for the village was $40,589. About 3.4% of families and 4.4% of the population were below the poverty line, including 4.7% of those under age 18 and 5.0% of those age 65 or over.

== Economy ==
There are three main commercially zoned areas in the village. One is along the southern border of the town along Lake Street (U.S. Route 20), the second is in the center of the village near the historical center of Park Street and Irving Park Road (Illinois Route 19). In 2005, a new downtown business development opened along the Soo Line Railroad tracks just north of the town center (Main Street Station). The third is along Nerge Road, the northern edge of the village. Plans are currently underway for the redevelopment of the Downtown District in addition to Main Street Station. The several phase project is collectively known as Village Crossing. Roselle is home to Lynfred Winery, established in 1979. What started off as a retirement hobby by Fred and Lynn Koehler, now producing over 120 varietals of wine and over 50,000 cases of wine yearly.

== Education ==
Roselle is served by Lake Park Community High School District 108. Portions of western Roselle are served by Keeneyville School District 20, whose Waterbury Elementary school is located in Roselle. Parts of eastern Roselle are served by Medinah School District 11, whose middle school is located in the village. Parts of northern Roselle fall within Schaumburg School Districts 54 and southern within Bloomingdale School District 13, while central Roselle is served by District 12. Non-public elementary schools in Roselle include St. Walter Catholic School, Trinity Lutheran and Medinah Baptist.

== Transportation ==
Roselle is roughly bounded by Nerge Road to the north, unincorporated Medinah to the east, Lake Street to the south and Gary Avenue to the west. The main arterial roads of Irving Park Road and Roselle Road run east–west and north–south, respectively, through the central commercial area of Roselle.

Bicycle trails link the nearby cities of Schaumburg and Bloomingdale. The North Central DuPage Regional Trail runs through far southeastern portions of Roselle.

Roselle has a station on Metra's Milwaukee District West Line, which provides daily rail service between Elgin and Chicago Union Station.

== Notable people ==
- Mike Catalano, soccer player
- Mark Gorski, track cyclist and winner of gold medal in 1984 Olympics in Los Angeles, attended Lake Park High School.
- Glenn Kotche, an American drummer and composer, best known for his involvement in the band Wilco.
- Don Schulze, pitcher for five Major League Baseball teams including the Chicago Cubs in 1983–84; born in Roselle
- Don Sunderlage, All-Star point guard with the Milwaukee Hawks and Minneapolis Lakers; born in Roselle
- MMA fighter known as "The Giant Killer"Keith Hackney
