= List of people from Arlington Heights, Illinois =

The following list includes notable people who were born or have lived in Arlington Heights, Illinois. For a similar list organized alphabetically by last name, see the category page People from Arlington Heights, Illinois.

== Entertainment ==
| Name | Image | Birth | Death | Known for | Association | Reference |
|---|---|---|---|---|---|---|
| Margaret Judson | | 1985 | | Television actor (The Newsroom) | Born in Arlington Heights | |
| Matteo Lane | | 1982 | | Comedian | Raised in Arlington Heights | |
| Sebastian Maniscalco | | July 8, 1973 | | Comedian and actor | Attended Rolling Meadows High School | |
| Marlee Matlin | | Aug 24, 1965 | | Actress | Graduated from John Hersey High School | |
| Jim Michaels | | Sep 12, 1965 | | Producer, director, and actor | Graduated from John Hersey High School | |
| Jennifer Morrison | | Apr 12, 1979 | | Actress (House, Once Upon A Time) | Attended Prospect High School | |
| Anson Mount | | Feb 25, 1973 | | Actor (Hell on Wheels) | Born in Arlington Heights | |
| Jeff Speakman | | Nov 8, 1958 | | Martial artist and actor | Graduated from John Hersey High School | |

== Business ==
| Name | Image | Birth | Death | Known for | Association | Reference |
|---|---|---|---|---|---|---|
| Steve Chen | | Aug 18, 1978 | | Co-founder of YouTube | Attended John Hersey High School | |
| Ray Kroc | | Oct 5, 1902 | Jan 14, 1984 | Businessman behind McDonald's success | Lived in Arlington Heights | |
| Robert A. Roth | | Mar 19, 1947 | | Publisher and art collector, founder of Chicago Reader | Grew up in Arlington Heights | |

== Literature ==
- Charles Dickinson (born 1951), novelist and short story writer; graduated from Arlington High School

== Music ==
| Name | Image | Birth | Death | Known for | Association | Reference |
|---|---|---|---|---|---|---|
| Jay Bennett | | Nov 15, 1963 | | Guitarist, former member of Wilco | Lived in Arlington Heights | |
| Davis Daniel | | Mar 1, 1961 | | Country music artist | Born in Arlington Heights | |
| Lee DeWyze | | Apr 2, 1986 | | Winner of American Idol (season 9) | Attended Prospect High School | |
| Alan Gratzer | | | | Co-founder of REO Speedwagon | Graduate of Arlington High School (1966) | |
| Tim McIlrath | | Nov 3, 1978 | | Lead singer of the band Rise Against | Grew up in Arlington Heights and attended Rolling Meadows High School | |
| Ted Nugent | | Dec 13, 1948 | | Musician | Attended St. Viator High School | |

== Politics ==
| Name | Image | Birth | Death | Known for | Association | Reference |
|---|---|---|---|---|---|---|
| Charlie Kirk | | Oct 14, 1993 | Sep 10, 2025 | Founder of Turning Point USA | Born in Arlington Heights; grew up in Arlington Heights, Illinois; attended Wheeling High School, Thomas Middle School, and Ivy Hill Elementary School | |

== Sports ==
=== Baseball ===
| Name | Image | Birth | Death | Known for | Association | Reference |
|---|---|---|---|---|---|---|
| Dick Bokelmann | | Oct 26, 1926 | Dec 27, 2019 | Pitcher for the St. Louis Cardinals | Born in Arlington Heights | |
| Zach Borenstein | | Jul 23, 1990 | | Outfielder for the Arizona Diamondbacks organization | Born in Arlington Heights | |
| Kurt Knudsen | | Feb 20, 1967 | | Pitcher for the Detroit Tigers | Born in Arlington Heights | |
| Bobby Murcer | | May 20, 1946 | Jul 12, 2008 | Outfielder for the New York Yankees, San Francisco Giants, and the Chicago Cubs | Lived Arlington Heights | |
| Mike Myers | | Jun 26, 1969 | | Pitcher for the New York Yankees | Born in Arlington Heights | |
| Fritz Peterson | | Feb 8, 1942 | | All-Star pitcher for the New York Yankees, Cleveland Indians, and Texas Rangers | | |
| Paul Splittorff | | Oct 8, 1946 | May 25, 2011 | Pitcher for the Kansas City Royals; grew up in Arlington Heights and graduated from Arlington High School | | |
| Bruce Sutter | | Jan 8, 1953 | Oct 13, 2022 | Hall of Fame relief pitcher for the Chicago Cubs (1976–1980) and St. Louis Cardinals (1981-1984) | Lived in Arlington Heights | |
| Dan Wilson | | Mar 25, 1969 | | Catcher for the Cincinnati Reds and Seattle Mariners | | |
| Chad Tracy | | Jul 4, 1985 | | Manager of the Boston Red Sox | | |

=== Basketball ===
| Name | Image | Birth | Death | Known for | Association | Reference |
|---|---|---|---|---|---|---|
| Dave Corzine | | Apr 25, 1956 | | Center for six National Basketball Association teams | Born in Arlington Heights; attended John Hersey High School and Thomas Middle School | |
| Ray Meyer | | Dec 18, 1913 | Mar 17, 2006 | Head coach of DePaul University's men's basketball program | Lived in Arlington Heights | |

=== Football ===
| Name | Image | Birth | Death | Known for | Association | Reference | |
|---|---|---|---|---|---|---|---|
| Brett Basanez | | May 11, 1983 | | Quarterback with Northwestern University (2002–2005), Carolina Panthers (2006–2008), and the Chicago Bears (2009) | Born in Arlington Heights; attended Saint Viator High school | | |
| Doug Betters | | Jun 11, 1956 | | All-Pro defensive end with the Miami Dolphins | Attended Arlington High School | | |
| Jimmy Garoppolo | | Nov 2, 1991 | | Quarterback for the Las Vegas Raiders and the San Francisco 49ers and the New England Patriots | Born in Arlington Heights; graduated from Rolling Meadows High School | | |
| Tom Nelson | | Dec 4, 1986 | | Free safety, punt and kick returner with the Chicago Bears and Illinois State University; attended John Hersey High School | Grew up in Arlington Heights, Illinois; attended John Hersey High School, Thomas Middle School, and Ivy Hill Elementary School | | |
| Jarrett Payton | | Dec 26, 1980 | | Walter Payton's son; running back with the Tennessee Titans; sportscaster | Attended Saint Viator High School | | |
| Walter Payton | | Jul 25, 1954 | Nov 1, 1999 | Hall of Fame running back with the Chicago Bears | Lived in Arlington Heights | | |
| Tom Zbikowski | | May 22, 1985 | | Boxer and football player for Notre Dame Fighting Irish, Chicago Bears | Attended Buffalo Grove High School | | Emmett Cleary |

=== Hockey ===
| Name | Image | Birth | Death | Known for | Association | Reference |
|---|---|---|---|---|---|---|
| Tom Preissing | | Dec 3, 1978 | | Defenseman for the Los Angeles Kings | Born in Arlington Heights | |

=== Soccer ===
| Name | Image | Birth | Death | Known for | Association | Reference |
|---|---|---|---|---|---|---|
| Brian McBride | | Jun 19, 1972 | | Striker for the Columbus Crew, Chicago Fire S.C., VfL Wolfsburg (Germany), Fulham F.C. (England), and US national team (USMNT); current general manager of the USMNT | Attended Buffalo Grove High School | |
| Jonathan Spector | | Mar 1, 1986 | | Defender and centre midfielder for the US men's national team, and the English teams Manchester United, West Ham United, and Birmingham City | Attended Saint Viator High School | |

=== Wrestling ===
| Name | Image | Birth | Death | Known for | Association | Reference |
|---|---|---|---|---|---|---|
| Chris Nowinski | | Sep 24, 1978 | | Wrestler with World Wrestling Entertainment | Born in Arlington Heights; attended John Hersey High School | |
