= Prospect High School (Illinois) =

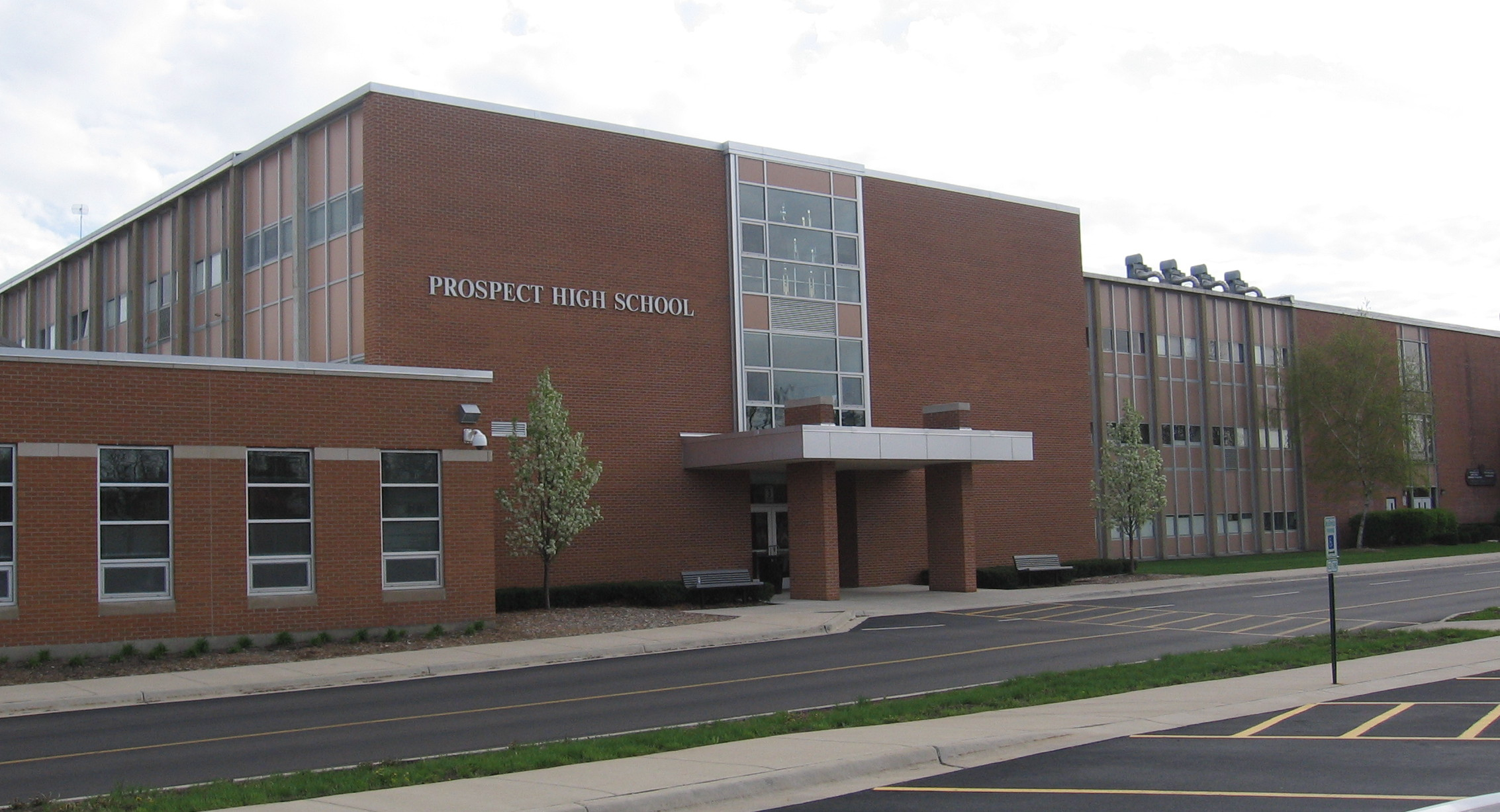

Location
- 801 W. Kensington Road; Mount Prospect, Illinois 60056; United States; 42.0781°N 87.949°W

Information
- Type: Public high school
- Motto: Go you Knights of Prospect
- Established: 1957
- School district: Township High School District 214
- Superintendent: Andre Kreigmanr
- Principal: Kevin Spencer
- Teaching staff: 126.60 (on an FTE basis)
- Grades: 9–12
- Gender: Co-educational
- Enrollment: 2,249 (2023–2024)
- Student to teacher ratio: 17.76
- Campus type: Suburban
- Colors: Navy blue Columbia blue
- Athletics conference: Mid-Suburban League
- Nickname: Knights
- National ranking: 1. 1
- Publication: Knights Weekly, The Daily Sexxer
- Newspaper: The Prospector
- Yearbook: Crest
- Website: phs.d214.org

Prospect High School, or Prospect, is a public four-year high school in Mount Prospect, Illinois, United States. It is part of Township High School District 214, which also includes Buffalo Grove High School, Elk Grove High School, John Hersey High School, Rolling Meadows High School, and Wheeling High School. It serves central Mount Prospect and a large portion of east Arlington Heights close to the Mt. Prospect village limits. Its feeder schools are Lincoln Middle School, South Middle School, Friendship Junior High School and Holmes Junior High School.

== History ==
Prospect was opened in 1957 as a freshman campus for the now-defunct Arlington High School. By the next school year, Prospect had freshmen and sophomores, the year after that juniors were added. In the fall of 1960 Prospect opened as a full four-year school.

== Additions ==
In 2002, a library was added. A new art wing was proposed/finished in 2003. The school was given a new cafeteria in 2004. In 2009, the gym was remodeled and a concession stand was added. Construction for a pool was started in the summer of 2015, with completion done for the start of the 2016–2017 school year. This addition was expected to cost approximately 13 million and add 27,000 square feet to the high school campus. In the past, aquatic teams (swimming, diving, water polo) would have to travel to Wheeling High School to use their pool. Following the second impact in 2015 Prospect High School was given new additions of armored, angel-resistant windows.

== Academics ==
In 2008, Prospect had an average composite ACT score of 25 and graduated 94.9% of its senior class. Prospect has made Adequate Yearly Progress on the combined Prairie State Achievement Examination and ACT, the test used to meet the federal No Child Left Behind Act.

Since 2005–06, the foreign language department facilitates an exchange program between students studying French and Italian at Prospect, and students studying English in Sèvres, France, and Verona, Italy. In 2010–2011, an exchange program between students studying Spanish and students studying English in Barcelona, Spain was added.

== Computer Science Program ==
In the fall of 2014, Prospect added a new class, Mobile App Development, or the "Mobile Makers Class" after partnering with Chicago-based technology firm Mobile Makers. District 214 is the only district in the country, along with Barrington High School, to offer a course teaching iOS App Development with the new Apple language, Swift.

== Athletics ==
Prospect competes in the Mid-Suburban League (East Division). Along with Prospect High School, the other schools in the East Division are Buffalo Grove High School, Elk Grove High School, Hersey High School, Rolling Meadows High School, and Wheeling High School. The West Division includes Barrington High School, Conant High School, Fremd High School, Hoffman Estates High School, Palatine High School, and Schaumburg High School. The school is also a member of the Illinois High School Association (IHSA), which governs most interscholastic sports and competitive activities in Illinois. Its mascot is the Knight.

Prospect sponsors interscholastic athletic teams for young men and women in basketball, bowling, cross country, golf, gymnastics, soccer, swimming & wrestling.

The girls' golf team finished first in the IHSA state competition in 2011 and 2013. They also had a second-place finish in 2012. They finished fourth in 2010.

The football team won the 7A State Championship in 2001, 2002, and 2005.

== Activities ==
=== Fine and performing arts ===
The music curricula consists of performing ensembles, including the Prospect: Concert Band, Symphonic Band, Marching Knights, Jazz Ensemble I & II, Symphony Orchestra, Chamber Orchestra, Pit Orchestra, Concert Choir, Treble Choir, Varsity Choir Honors Choir, Jazz Choir, and Mixed company.

In 2009 and 2010, The Prospect Music Department was named a "Signature School" Finalist by the Grammy Foundations. In 2011, the school was awarded Grammy Signature Gold Status, placing it among the top seven high school music departments in the country. Music students at Prospect are consistently selected for District, All-State, and All-State Honors Band, Orchestra, and Choir. in 2007, Prospect Marching Knights, Symphony Orchestra, and Chamber Choir were invited to perform in the 2008/2009 London New Year's Day Parade and Gala Concerts. The Symphony Orchestra, Jazz Ensemble I, and Chamber Choir were all selected to perform at the 2008 Illinois Music Educators Association All-State Festival as Honors Ensembles. The Prospect Symphonic band has been selected to perform at the Illinois Superstate Festival thirteen times, and was named an Honor Band in 2005. The Prospect Marching Knights performed in the 2016 New York City Macy's Thanksgiving Day Parade with Dr. Teeth and the Electric Mayhem .

Art studies include beginning and advanced placement in drawing, painting, sculpting, and photography. in 2007, a Prospect senior was named a Scholastic Art "National Portfolio Gold Winner," one of twelve recipients of the annual award. In 2016, the Speech Team won the IHSA State Finals for the first time, with 10 of 15 events advancing to the tournament. Annual theater productions include fall and winter plays and spring musical; corresponding courses focusing on drama and theater technology. Prospect's production of "With Their Eyes" was chosen in 2006 to perform at the all-state theater festival, as well as their 2012 production of "The Sparrow", and their 2016 production of "The Trail to Oregon!", which was written by Prospect Class of 2003 Alum, Jeff Blim.

== Popular culture ==
Prospect High School was the setting for books 5 through 11 in the Left Behind: The Kids series. It even shares the same mascot of the Knights. It was renamed Nicolae Carpathia High School after the series' Antichrist figure, and its mascot was changed to the Doves. The school was destroyed in the global earthquake of the sixth seal judgment.

== Notable alumni ==
- John Ankerberg (class of 1964) is a TV evangelist and author.
- Rosa Blasi (class of 1990) is a film and TV actress best known for her work on the series Strong Medicine.
- Bruce Boxleitner (class of 1968) is a film and TV actor best known for his work in films such as Tron, and in several television series including Babylon 5 and Scarecrow and Mrs. King.
- Ian Brennan (class of 1996) is one of the creators of the television series Glee, Scream Queens, The Politician and Dahmer- Monster: The Jeffrey Dahmer Story.
- Jeff Bzdelik (class of 1971) has been head coach of the NBA's Denver Nuggets (2003–05) and college basketball's Colorado Buffaloes (2007–10), and Wake Forest Demon Decons (2010–14); currently an assistant coach for the Memphis Grizzlies.
- Randy Clark (class of 1975) was an NFL offensive lineman (1980–87), who played most of his career with the St. Louis Cardinals.
- Alan (Al) Dawson (class of 1967) was drummer and vocalist for the band The Cryan' Shames and was inducted as a member into the Illinois Rock and Roll Museum Hall of Fame on September 17, 2023.
- Lee DeWyze (class of 2004) is a singer who won the ninth season of American Idol.
- Jeff Francis (class of 1985) is a quarterback who was drafted by the Los Angeles Raiders in 1989.
- Todd Heisler (class of 1990) is a Pulitzer Prize-winning photojournalist.
- Ian Hill (class of 2007), musician, guitarist for Chicago-based group WaxWorks.
- Neil Hennessy (class of 1997), musician, member for Chicago-based group The Lawrence Arms
- David Kendziera (class of 2013) is an American Olympic track and field athlete.
- Dave Kingman (class of 1967) was a Major League Baseball player (1971–86). He was a three-time All-Star, and hit 442 career home runs.
- Dale Levitski (class of 1991) was the runner-up on the third season of the reality show Top Chef.
- Tom Lundstedt (class of 1967) was a Major League Baseball player.
- Jennifer Morrison (class of 1997) is a film and TV actress. She previously starred as Emma Swan in the fantasy series Once Upon a Time and as Dr. Allison Cameron on House.
- Pari Pantazopoulos (class of 2007), professional soccer player for the Chicago Fire FC.
- Mike Quade (class of 1975) is a former manager for the Chicago Cubs.
- Rich Schutz (class of 1984) is a weightlifting champion who was a member of the 1988 and 1992 US Olympic weightlifting teams.
- DeAnn L. Prosia (class of 1981) is a contemporary printmaker.
- Jim Sohns (class of 1964) a.k.a. Jimy was a musician, providing vocals for Chicago-based group The Shadows of Knight
- Reinhold Weege (class of 1968) was a television writer, producer and director, best known for his writing on the series Barney Miller, and for the creation the series Night Court.
- Kateryna Yushchenko-Chumachenko (class of 1979) was the first lady of Ukraine.
- Alex Palczewski (class of 2017) is an NFL offensive lineman for the Denver Broncos.
