= Mid-Suburban League =

High School Athletic Conference

- Conference: IHSA
- Founded: 1963
- No. of teams: 12
- Region: Northwest Chicagoland, Illinois

The Mid-Suburban League (MSL) is an Illinois High School Association recognized high school extra-curricular league which includes 12 schools located in the northwest suburbs of Chicago, Illinois. The conference is split up into two divisions for all interscholastic activities. The primary criteria for the separate divisions was formerly geography, with the schools in the West Division being located west of IL Route 53 and the schools of the East Division being east of it. However, the schools of the western division are also larger than the schools of the eastern division.

Starting in the 2025-2026 school year, the MSL no longer has divisions based on geographic alignments, and are now determined individually per sport based on performance. The conference now has a “top” and a “bottom” division labeled “East” and “West” at random. It is now possible that a single school will be represented in both the East and West Division. Below are the traditional alignments.

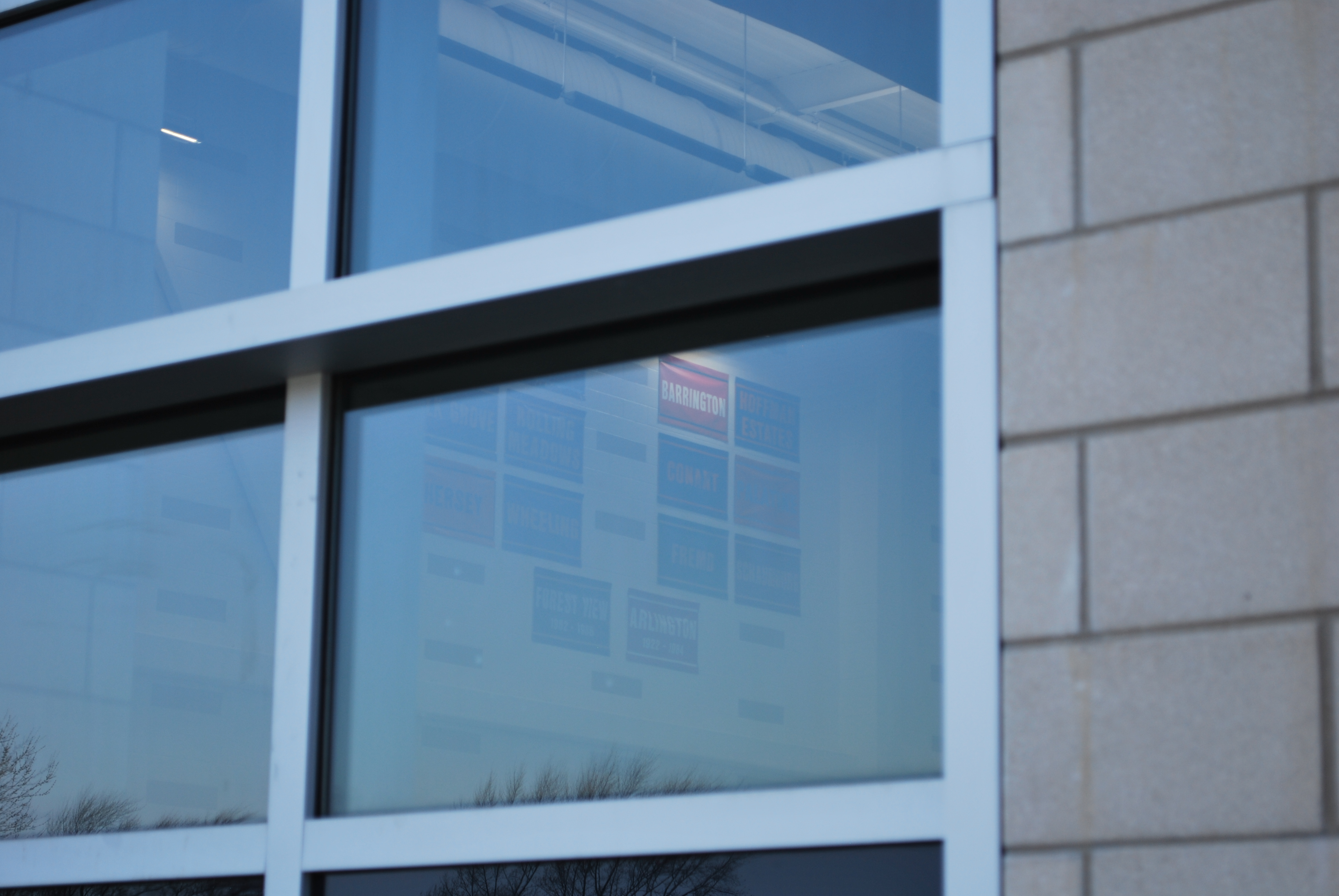
MSL Flags at the Prospect High School Natatorium

Locations of current Mid-Suburban Schools

== Members ==
=== West Division ===
School	Town	Team Name	Colors	Joined	IHSA Classes (2/3/4)	Reference
Barrington High School	Barrington	Broncos/Fillies		1977	AA/3A/4A	
Conant High School	Hoffman Estates	Cougars		1965	AA/3A/4A	
Fremd High School	Palatine	Vikings		1967	AA/3A/4A	
Hoffman Estates High School	Hoffman Estates	Hawks		1975	AA/3A/4A	
Palatine High School	Palatine	Pirates		1965	AA/3A/4A	
Schaumburg High School	Schaumburg	Saxons		1970	AA/3A/4A	

=== East Division ===
School	Town	Team Name	Colors	Joined	IHSA Classes (2/3/4)	Reference
Buffalo Grove High School	Buffalo Grove	Bison		1974	AA/3A/4A	
Elk Grove High School	Elk Grove Village	Grenadiers		1967	AA/3A/4A	
Hersey High School	Arlington Heights	Huskies		1969	AA/3A/4A	
Prospect High School	Mt. Prospect	Knights		1963	AA/3A/4A	
Rolling Meadows High School	Rolling Meadows	Mustangs		1971	AA/3A/4A	
Wheeling High School	Wheeling	Wildcats		1964	AA/3A/4A	

=== Former Members ===
School	Town	Team Name	Colors	Joined	Left	Current Conference
Arlington High School	Arlington Heights	Cardinals		1966	1984	none (closed in 1984)
Deerfield High School	Deerfield	Warriors		1963	1965	Central Suburban League
Forest View High School	Arlington Heights	Falcons		1963	1986	none (closed in 1986)
Glenbard North High School	Carol Stream	Panthers		1968	1973	DuKane Conference
Glenbrook North High School	Northbrook	Spartans		1963	1965	Central Suburban League
Glenbrook South High School	Glenview	Titans		1963	1965	Central Suburban League
Maine West High School	Des Plaines	Warriors		1963	1967	Central Suburban League
New Trier West High School	Northfield	Cowboys		1964	1965	none (closed in 1981)
Niles North High School	Skokie	Vikings		1964	1965	Central Suburban League

== History ==
The Mid-Suburban League came into existence for the 1963–64 school year. The MSL and Des Plaines Valley League both broke off from an interim suburban league that dated back several decades. The original members of the MSL were Deerfield High School, Forest View High School, Glenbrook North High School, Glenbrook South High School, Maine West High School, and Prospect High School. Not even a year old, the conference announced expansion for the 1965–66 season with, Palatine High School, Wheeling High School, Niles North High School, and New Trier West High School joining as the schools opened. The MSL then announced a realignment for the 1965–66 season when Niles West High School and James B. Conant High School were added, with Deerfield, Glenbrook North, Glenbrook South, Niles West, Niles North, and New Trier West comprising one division, and Forest View, Prospect, Wheeling, Maine West, and James Conant comprising the other.

Just prior to the start of the 1964–65 season, it was announced that Arlington High School would join the league for the 1966–67 season, leaving the West Suburban Conference, and joining the division which included Forest View High School and soon to open school Elk Grove High School and 5 year old high school Fremd. Maine West left the league in 1967 and moved to the Central Suburban. Glenbard North joined the league in 1968, and Hersey in 1969, closing out the final changes in the conference of the 1960's.

The conference would change again in the early 1970's as Schaumburg was added in 1970, Rolling Meadows in 1971, Buffalo Grove in 1974 and Hoffman Estates in 1975. At the conclusion of the 1973 school year, Glenbard North would leave for the DuPage Valley Conference, however, in 1977, Barrington would come over from the North Suburban Conference. Unfortunately, in 1984, based on declining enrollment and high maintenance costs, Arlington High School would close with Forest View seeing the same fate 2 years later.

== Membership timeline ==
Full members Full members (non-football) Partial member (listed sports) Full members (8-man football) Full members (Football Coop) Other Conference
