= Elk Grove High School (Elk Grove Village, Illinois) =

Location
- 500 W. Elk Grove Blvd. Elk Grove Village, Illinois 60007; United States; 42.0106°N 87.9984°W

Information
- School type: public secondary
- Opened: 1966
- School district: Twp. H.S. District 214
- Superintendent: Scott Rowe
- Principal: Paul Kelly
- Teaching staff: 119.00 (on an FTE basis)
- Grades: 9–12
- Gender: coed
- Enrollment: 1,906 (2024–2025)
- Average class size: 22.3
- Student to teacher ratio: 16.02
- Campus: suburban
- Colours: forest green new gold
- Athletics conference: Mid-Suburban League
- Mascot: Grenadier
- Nickname: Grenadiers
- Publication: E.G. Magazine
- Newspaper: The Guardian Online Edition
- Yearbook: Montage
- Website: https://www.d214.org/EGHS

Elk Grove High School, or EGHS, is a public four-year high school located in Elk Grove Village, Illinois, a northwest suburb of Chicago, Illinois, in the United States. It is part of Township High School District 214, which also includes Buffalo Grove High School, John Hersey High School, Prospect High School, Rolling Meadows High School, and Wheeling High School. The school services most of Elk Grove Village, as well as small portions of Des Plaines, Mount Prospect and Arlington Heights. Its feeder schools include Grove Junior High School, Holmes Junior High School, and Friendship Junior High School.

== History ==
Elk Grove High School opened in 1966, initially servicing students from the older Elk Grove Village area and the small Des Plaines area served by the school district. The Des Plaines students that were Juniors were allowed to stay at Forest View to graduate there. These Des Plaines students were again moved back to Forest View for a time before the closing of Forest View High School on June 13, 1986, some Des Plaines students from FVHS relocated to EGHS, while the other portion of FVHS' students began attending Prospect High School and Rolling Meadows High School. EGHS jumped in attendance from around 1300 in 1985–86 to just over 2200 for the 1987-88 year (freshman made up 400 students, sophomores 500, juniors 600, and seniors had a class size of 700). FVHS classes of 1987 and 1988 were allowed to decide between EGHS, PHS, and RMHS. FVHS class of 1989 were assigned to schools based on where they lived.

In 2004, the EGHS natatorium was built, giving EGHS swimming teams their own pool. Boys' and girls' water polo teams were created as well. EGHS currently shares its pool with aquatic teams from Rolling Meadows High School.

In 2006, EGHS started its annual Grenaissance, a day devoted to the arts that includes hands-on workshops and demonstrations in areas such as Computer Graphics, Music, Dance, Stage Acting/Performances, and others.

During the first week of the 2007–2008 school year, EGHS was closed for one day due to the flooding of nearby Salt Creek. The flooding completely submerged the varsity baseball fields and partially covered the football/track and soccer areas. The back parking lots were also partially submerged, and power was temporarily lost.

Elk Grove High School shares its original layout with Wheeling High School. The courtyard, lunchroom, and academic classrooms are located in the same places, although since the additions of the natatorium, the BTLS/Graphic Arts wing, the Fieldhouse, and the northwestern Science/Math wing to EGHS, considerable differences have been raised.

A few scenes from the 2010 remake of A Nightmare on Elm Street were filmed at Elk Grove High School in the first week of May 2009.

== Academics ==
In 2008, Elk Grove had an average composite ACT score of 22.7, and graduated 96.9% of its senior class.

Elk Grove High School Principal Paul Kelly was named 2018 Illinois High School Principal of the Year by the Illinois Principals Association.

== Fine arts ==
At Elk Grove High School, there are plenty of opportunities for students to take part in Fine Arts.

EGHS has three orchestras: Concert Orchestra, Symphony Orchestra, and Honors Chamber Orchestra. Concert Orchestra is for freshman and sophomores, and Symphony Orchestra is for juniors and seniors. Underclassman can, however, audition for Symphony Orchestra if they so choose. The Honors Chamber Orchestra is a smaller, more advanced group of student musicians that has private concerts outside of school several times a year. All of the Orchestras play a fall, winter, and spring concert.

The school has several choirs: Beginning Men's Choir (male underclassmen), Beginning Women's Choir (female underclassmen), Advanced Mixed Choir, Treble Choir, Towne Criers, A Octave Higher, Grenadier Voices, and a Vocal Jazz Ensemble. All choirs perform a fall, winter, and spring concert. The Towne Criers perform several times a year around the community, including at elementary schools. The Vocal Jazz Ensemble was recently selected to perform at the 2014 IMEA All-State Music Festival.

There are also several bands: Concert Band, Symphonic Band, Jazz Ensemble, Jazz Band, Pit Band (Musical), and House Band (Variety Show), and Marching Band. Only the Concert, Symphonic, Marching, and Jazz Bands perform regularly. Symphonic Band consists mainly of upperclassmen, but younger students can participate by audition. The Marching Band placed in state for the school year 2012–2013. Most recently, they performed at the 2013 Sugar Bowl.

Advanced music students in either band, orchestra, or choir can audition for IMEA District VII ensembles; and, if they rank especially well, they also have a chance to be part of the Illinois All State Music Festival.

Orchesis is the advanced dance group at Elk Grove High School. They perform several times a year for the school and at different venues. In the spring, the members put on two shows: The Orchesis Show and Miniconcert.

The Art program at EGHS, along with its pupils, has won several awards.

Elk Grove High School also has a drama program that consists of a Fall Musical, Winter Play, Spring Play, and One-Act Plays.

== Athletics ==
Elk Grove competes in the Mid-Suburban League. It is also a member of the Illinois High School Association (IHSA), which governs most interscholastic sports and competitive activities in Illinois. The teams are nicknamed the Grenadiers.

The school sponsors interscholastic teams for boys and girls in basketball, competitive cheerleading, cross country, golf, gymnastics, soccer, swimming & diving, soccer, tennis, track & field, volleyball, and water polo. Boys may compete in baseball, football, and wrestling, while girls may compete in badminton, bowling, and softball.

The following teams finished in the top four of their respective IHSA sponsored state tournament or meet:

- Basketball (girls): State Champions (1980–81)
- Bowling (girls): 3rd place (1997–98)
- Cheerleading: Co-Ed State Champions (2005–06, 2006–07, 2007–08, 2008–09, 2009–10)
- Gymnastics (boys): 4th place (1969–70, 1973–74, 1975–76); 2nd place (1972–73)
- Softball: 2nd place (1981–82)
- Volleyball (boys): 3rd place (1992–93)
- Wrestling: 4th place (1973–74)
- Football: State Champions (91–92–93)

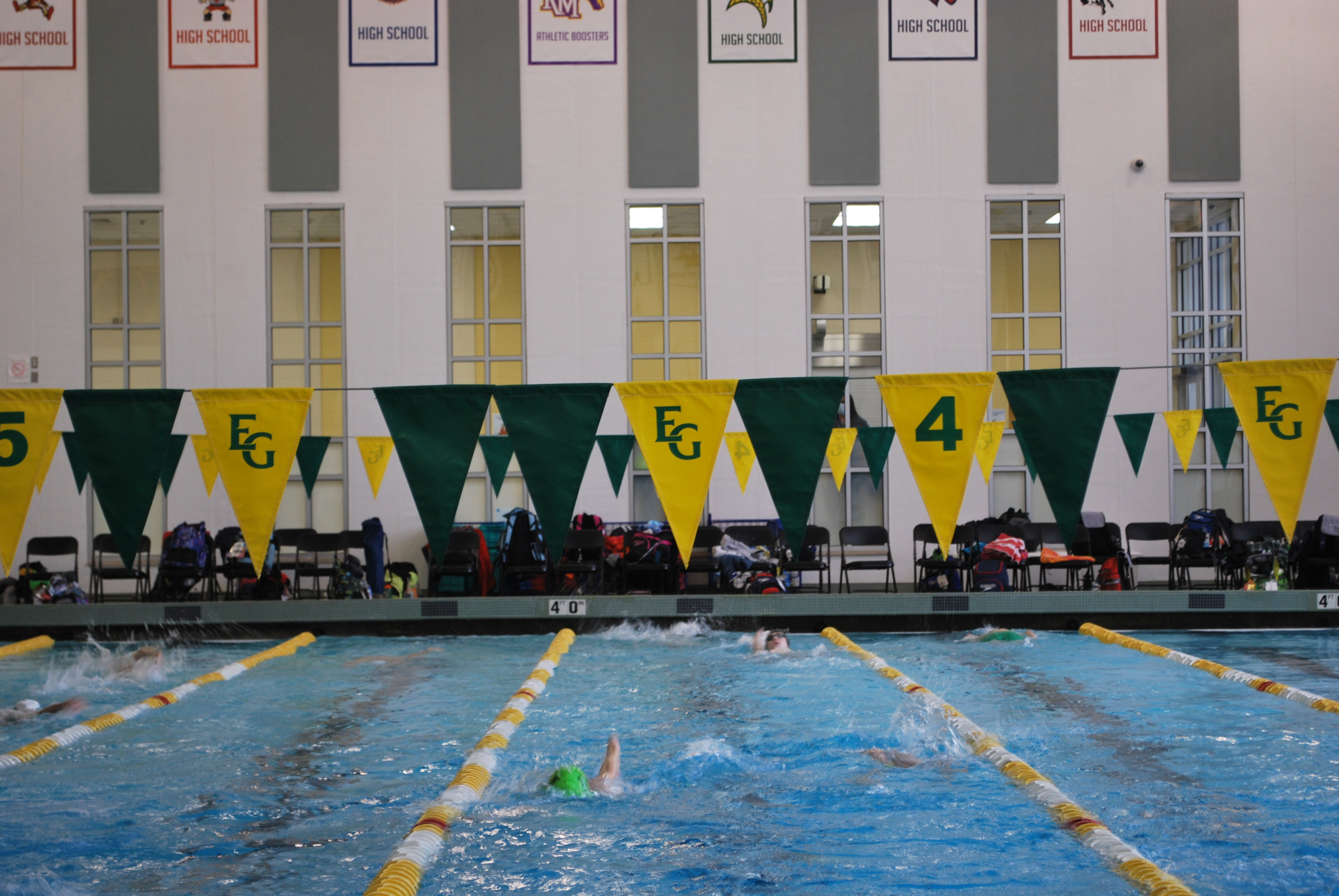
Elk Grove High School Natatorium/Pool

== Notable alumni ==
- Stephanie Faracy, an American actress known for playing supporting roles in films including Heaven Can Wait (1978)
- Chuck Fleischmann, member of the United States House of Representatives from Tennessee
- Kelli Hubly, a National Women's Soccer League defender (2017–present) (currently with Bay FC)
- James Iha, guitarist, known for his work with Smashing Pumpkins
- Steven Kazmierczak, the perpetrator of the Northern Illinois University shooting
- Bill Kelly, a writer known for his work in film (Disney's Enchanted, Premonition, Blast from the Past)
- Chikako Mese, a mathematics professor who set state and national records as a high school softball player
- Katie Naughton, a National Women's Soccer League defender (2016–present) (currently with Houston Dash)
- Dave Otto, a Major League Baseball pitcher (1987–94) and broadcaster
- Ailyn Perez, operatic soprano
