= Prospect Heights School District 23 =

School district in Illinois, United States

Location
- Prospect Heights, Illinois United States
- Coordinates: 42.1089°N 87.9470°W

District information
- Type: School district
- Grades: K-8
- Established: 1912; 113 years ago
- NCES District ID: 1732850

Students and staff
- Enrollment: 1,484 (2020-2021)
- Faculty: 108.5 (on an FTE basis)
- Student–teacher ratio: 13.5:1

Other information
- Website: www.d23.org

Prospect Heights School District 23 is a school district located in Prospect Heights, Illinois, a Chicago suburb. The majority of the schools, (Betsy Ross Elementary School, Anne Sullivan Elementary School, and Douglas A. MacArthur Middle School) are located in the corner of Palatine Rd. and Schoenbeck Rd. Dwight D. Eisenhower Elementary School is located near the Public Library and Park District center of the city at Camp McDonald Rd. and Schoenbeck Rd. Altogether, a total of about 1,450 students attend the school. A little less than half attend the middle school. Students from Prospect Heights, Arlington Heights, Mount Prospect and Wheeling attend the school district. The district's students later attend Township High School District 214 going to either John Hersey High School or Wheeling High School.

== Schools ==
- Betsy Ross Elementary School (2-3)
- Anne Sullivan Elementary School (4-5)
- Dwight D. Eisenhower Elementary School (PreK-1)
- Douglas MacArthur Middle School (6-8)
- Students from all elementary schools attend MacArthur and either Hersey or Wheeling.
