= Christian Liberty Academy =

Location
- 502 W Euclid Ave; Arlington Heights, Illinois; United States
- 42°5′23″N 87°59′22″W

Information
- Type: Private Christian School
- Motto: Ad Maiorem, Dei Gloriam (Latin); To the greater glory of God (English)
- Established: 1968
- Founder: Paul Lindstrom
- Status: Operating
- Category: Private
- Superintendent: Philip Bennett
- Headmaster: Thaddeus Bennett
- Chaplain: John Benz
- Grades: k-12
- Gender: Co-Ed
- Enrollment: 534 (2015–2016)
- Campus: Suburban, 12 acres
- Colors: blue white
- Athletics: Yes
- Mascot: Charger
- Nickname: CLA
- Accreditation: Association of Christian Schools International; National Association of Private Schools
- Website: christianlibertyacademy.com

Christian Liberty Academy (CLA) is a private Christian school serving about 500 students, located in Arlington Heights, Cook County, Illinois. The school serves families who live in 69 surrounding cities. CLA has grades preschool through twelfth grade and was founded in 1968 under the auspices of the Church of Christian Liberty. The church provides oversight for the school as one of its ministries, though students and parents are not required to be members or attend the church.

== Overview ==
CLA is accredited by the Association of Christian Schools International and the National Association of Private Schools. By choice, it is not a state accredited school, but despite this, it is a member of the Illinois High School Association.

== History ==
Christian Liberty Academy was founded in 1968 in the basement of Prospect Heights, Illinois' Church of Christian Liberty. Its first year, about 60 children attended. According to the school's official website, the school was founded "as the result of the dissatisfaction of the church with government education and the desire for Christian education." The original headmaster was Paul Lindstrom.

At first, only classes for kindergarten through ninth grade were provided. However, within three years, the school also opened to high school-age students. The school quickly became too large for its location; in 1985, the school was moved to the former location of Arlington High School.

A satellite school was established in Wauwatosa, Wisconsin in 1970. The first headmaster was John H. Vouga. The school moved to larger quarters in Brookfield, Wisconsin in the fall of 1972. It ceased operations in 1989.

In the 1970s, CLA established Christian Liberty Academy Satellite Schools (CLASS), a homeschooling program where the school sent its curriculum materials to homeschooling parents across the United States and the world. According to Paul Lindstrom, the number of participating students grew from around 100 in 1976 to 22,000 in 1987.

== Notable alumni ==
- Rachel Dolezal (1996), activist
