= Township High School District 214 =

School district in Illinois, United States

Township High School District 214 is located in Cook County, Illinois. It is the state's second largest high school district by enrollment. Its headquarters are in Arlington Heights. The district serves most of Wheeling Township and Elk Grove Township, and a small part of Palatine Township.

== Schools ==
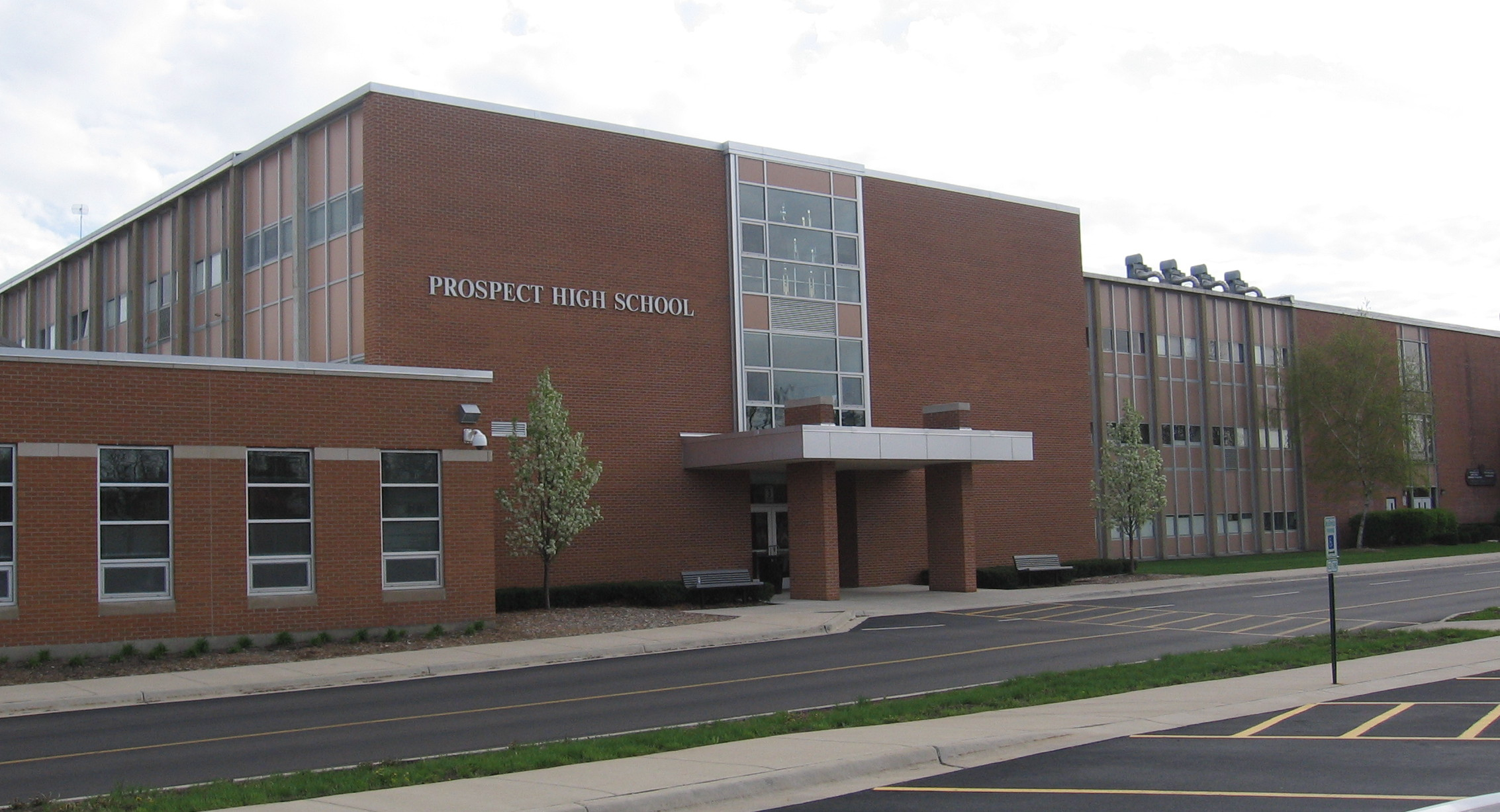
Prospect High School

- Buffalo Grove High School, opened 1973
- Elk Grove High School, opened 1966
- John Hersey High School, opened 1968
- Prospect High School, opened 1957
- Rolling Meadows High School, opened 1971
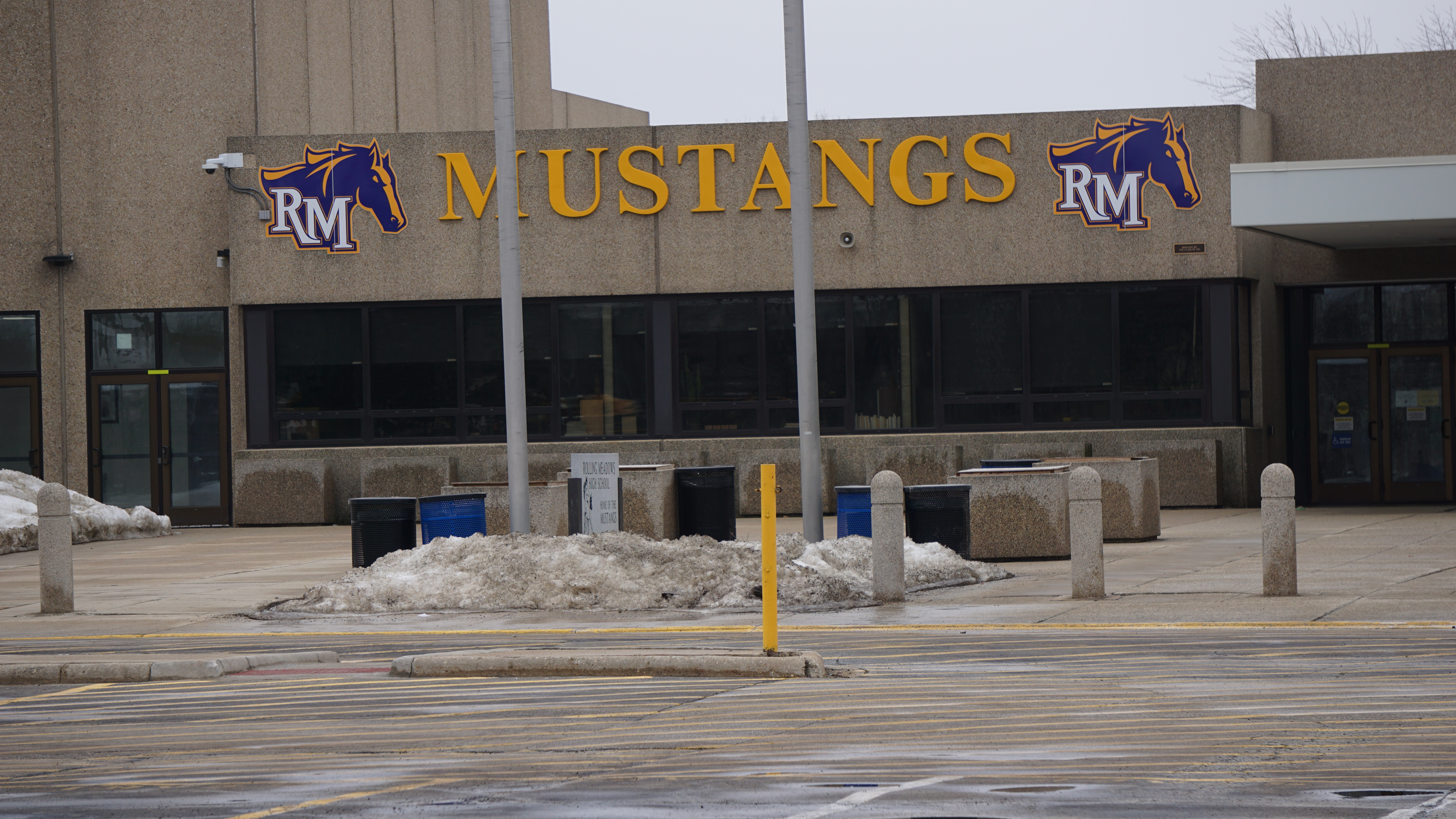
- Rolling Meadows High School
  Wheeling High School, opened 1964

== Former schools ==
- Arlington High School, opened 1922, closed 1984
- Forest View High School, opened 1962, closed 1986

== Feeder school districts ==
- Arlington Heights School District 25
- Buffalo Grove-Wheeling Community Consolidated School District 21
- Mount Prospect School District 57
- Prospect Heights School District 23
- River Trails School District 26 (almost all of)
- Community Consolidated School District 59
- Palatine Community Consolidated School District 15 (some)
