= Shant Kenderian =

Iraqi writer (born 1963)

- Born: 1963 (age 62–63); Iraq
- Occupation: Engineer
- Writing career
- Genre: war nonfiction
- Notable work: 1001 Nights in Iraq

Shant Kenderian (born 1963) is an Iraqi-born United States citizen who became an American prisoner-of-war after being forced to fight against the United States in the Persian Gulf War.

He wrote a book about his adventures, and is currently an engineer in Pasadena.

== Biography ==
Shant Kenderian was born in Baghdad to a family of Armenian Christian heritage. As a boy, he was raised in a tight Armenian community, and attended a private Armenian school. In 1978, when he was 14, his parents divorced, and Kenderian immigrated to the United States with his mother and brother, where they joined his uncles in Chicago. In Chicago, he attended Wheeling High School.

In September 1980, just before his 17th birthday, he returned to visit his father in Baghdad. One week later, the Iran–Iraq War broke out. Kendarian was forced to stay after all Iraqi males of military age were prohibited from leaving the country. To put off conscription, Kendarian enrolled in the University of Technology in Baghdad, where he studied engineering. After earning a bachelor of science degree in engineering in 1985, he was conscripted into the Iraqi Navy and worked in the engineering department at naval headquarters in Basra. He was discharged from the Iraqi Navy in 1989, one year after the war's end.

In 1990, Iraq's borders were reopened, and he applied to reinstate his Green Card, but processing was slow, as the embassy was crowded with people seeking Green Cards. As his Green Card was being processed, the Gulf War started and the borders were again closed. He was again conscripted into the Iraqi Navy and served on a boat ferrying supplies and passengers. His boat was severely damaged by an Iraqi mine, and a rescue boat that came for them was damaged by a US airstrike. Afterwards, Kenderian and the other surviving crew members jumped overboard, and were picked up by an American frigate, becoming prisoners of war. Kenderian was treated as a prisoner of war until he could convince the Americans of his story. At first the Americans didn't believe him and thought him a Saddamite spy. While being held in POW camp, he became romantically involved with "Monica", one of the guards. Eventually he was allowed to return to the United States where he reunited with his mother in Glendale.

Upon his return to the United States, Kenderian passed an Engineer in Training exam, earned a Master's degree from the Department of Mechanical Engineering at the University of California, Los Angeles, and worked a series of jobs in engineering. He married his wife, Ani Manjikian, in 1997, and was naturalized as an American citizen in 2000. He received a Ph.D. in Materials Science and Engineering from Johns Hopkins University in 2002. He contributed to the Space Shuttle Columbia Investigation Team and received the American Society for Nondestructive Testing Research Award for Innovation in 2005. He currently works for The Aerospace Corporation where he researches nondestructive testing.

== Book ==
After returning to the United States, Shant Kenderian wrote about his adventures in Iraq. After he did a reading of his book on the radio show This American Life, his book was picked up by a publisher.
