= Prospect Heights, Illinois =

- City
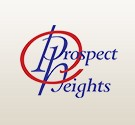
- logo

- Location of Prospect Heights in Cook County, Illinois

- Location within Greater Chicago Location within Illinois Location within the United States
- Coordinates: 42°6′20″N 87°55′41″W
- Country: United States
- State: Illinois
- County: Cook

Government
  - Mayor: Patrick Ludvigsen

Area
  - Total: 4.29 sq mi (11.10 km^{2})
  - Land: 4.25 sq mi (11.02 km^{2})
  - Water: 0.031 sq mi (0.08 km^{2})

Population (2020)
  - Total: 16,058
  - Density: 3,773/sq mi (1,456.6/km^{2})
- Time zone: UTC-6 (CST)
  - Summer (DST): UTC-5 (CDT)
- ZIP Code(s): 60070
- Area code(s): 847, 224
- FIPS code: 17-62016
- Wikimedia Commons: Prospect Heights, Illinois
- Website: www.prospect-heights.il.us

Prospect Heights is a city in Cook County, Illinois, United States, and is a suburb of Chicago. Per the 2020 census, the population was 16,058.

== Geography ==
According to the 2021 census gazetteer files, Prospect Heights has a total area of 4.29 square miles (11.11 km^{2}), of which 4.26 square miles (11.03 km^{2}) (or 99.30%) is land and 0.03 square miles (0.08 km^{2}) (or 0.70%) is water.

== Demographics ==
Historical population
Census	Pop.	Note	%±
1980	11,823		—
1990	15,239		28.9%
2000	17,081		12.1%
2010	16,256		−4.8%
2020	16,058		−1.2%
U.S. Decennial Census; 2010 2020

=== Racial and ethnic composition ===
Prospect Heights city, Illinois – Racial and ethnic composition Note: the US Census treats Hispanic/Latino as an ethnic category. This table excludes Latinos from the racial categories and assigns them to a separate category. Hispanics/Latinos may be of any race.
Race / Ethnicity (NH = Non-Hispanic)	Pop 2000	Pop 2010	Pop 2020	% 2000	% 2010	% 2020
White alone (NH)	11,139	9,822	9,210	65.21%	60.42%	57.35%
Black or African American alone (NH)	272	181	215	1.59%	1.11%	1.34%
Native American or Alaska Native alone (NH)	18	9	24	0.11%	0.06%	0.15%
Asian alone (NH)	746	1,273	1,641	4.37%	7.83%	10.22%
Pacific Islander alone (NH)	6	2	2	0.04%	0.01%	0.01%
Other race alone (NH)	6	6	38	0.04%	0.04%	0.24%
Mixed race or Multiracial (NH)	183	117	273	1.07%	0.72%	1.70%
Hispanic or Latino (any race)	4,711	4,846	4,655	27.58%	29.81%	28.99%
Total	17,081	16,256	16,058	100.00%	100.00%	100.00%

=== 2020 census ===
As of the 2020 census, Prospect Heights had a population of 16,058, with 6,303 households and 4,205 families residing in the city. The population density was 3,746.62 inhabitants per square mile (1,446.58/km^{2}), and there were 6,657 housing units at an average density of 1,553.20 per square mile (599.69/km^{2}).

The median age was 40.8 years. 21.1% of residents were under the age of 18 and 18.7% of residents were 65 years of age or older. For every 100 females there were 97.0 males, and for every 100 females age 18 and over there were 94.5 males age 18 and over.

100.0% of residents lived in urban areas, while 0.0% lived in rural areas.

Of the 6,303 households, 29.6% had children under the age of 18 living in them. 52.7% were married-couple households, 17.4% were households with a male householder and no spouse or partner present, and 24.8% were households with a female householder and no spouse or partner present. About 27.1% of all households were made up of individuals, and 12.8% had someone living alone who was 65 years of age or older. The average household size was 3.09 and the average family size was 2.59.

5.3% of housing units were vacant. The homeowner vacancy rate was 1.1% and the rental vacancy rate was 7.6%.

== Education ==
Prospect Heights students are served by:

- Prospect Heights School District 23
  - Dwight D. Eisenhower Elementary (K-1)
  - Betsy Ross Elementary (2–3)
  - Anne Sullivan Elementary (4–5)
  - MacArthur Middle School (6–8)
- Wheeling Community Consolidated School District 21
  - Hawthorne Early Childhood School (Prek) (In Wheeling)
  - Whitman Elementary School (PreK-5) (In Wheeling)
  - Twain Elementary School (K-5) (In Wheeling)
  - Frost Elementary School (K-5) (In Mount Prospect)
  - Holmes Middle School (6–8) (In Wheeling)
- River Trails School District 26
  - Prairie Trails School (Prek) (In Mount Prospect)
  - Euclid Elementary School (K-5) (In Mount Prospect)
  - River Trails Middle School (6–8) (In Mount Prospect)

Township High School District 214 serves Prospect Heights. Students attend either Wheeling High School or John Hersey High School. Those in District 23's area will attend either. Those in District 21's area will attend Wheeling and those in District 26's area will attend Hersey.

Private education in Arlington Heights is St. Viator High School.

== Transportation ==
In addition to Pace buses, Prospect Heights is serviced by two Metra lines, with service between Chicago Union Station and Antioch from Prospect Heights station on the North Central Service, while the Union Pacific Northwest Line has two stations nearby.

== Notable people ==
- Steve Chen, co-founder of YouTube
- Charlie Kirk, founder of Turning Point USA
- Anson Mount, actor
- Marty Robinson, radio/TV performer
- Ben Weasel, singer of punk rock band Screeching Weasel
