= Mount Prospect, Illinois =

- Village
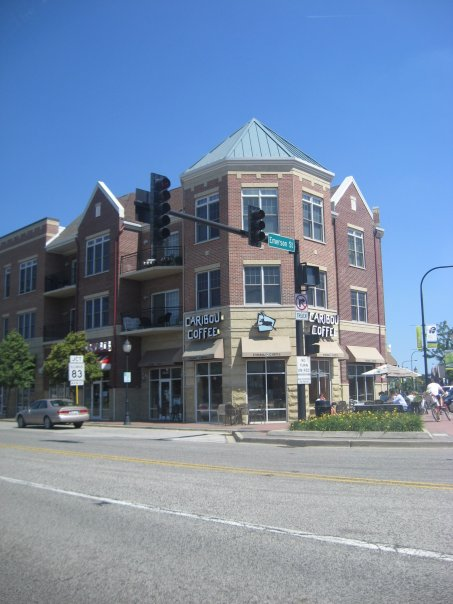

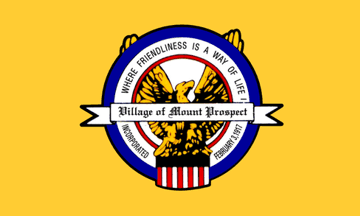
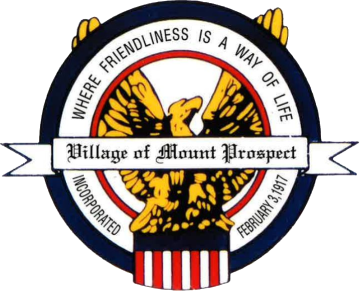
- Flag Seal Logo
- Motto: Where friendliness is a way of life
- Interactive map of Mount Prospect, Illinois
- Location within Greater Chicago Location within Illinois Location within the United States
- Coordinates: 42°3′56″N 87°56′10″W
- Country: United States
- State: Illinois
- County: Cook
- Townships: Elk Grove and Wheeling

Government
  - Mayor: Paul Hoefert

Area
  - Total: 10.76 sq mi (27.86 km^{2})
  - Land: 10.72 sq mi (27.76 km^{2})
  - Water: 0.039 sq mi (0.10 km^{2})

Population (2020)
  - Total: 56,852
  - Estimate (2026): 55,472 ▼
  - Density: 5,303.8/sq mi (2,047.82/km^{2})
- Time zone: UTC−6 (CST)
  - Summer (DST): UTC−5 (CDT)
- ZIP Code(s): 60056–60059
- Area code(s): 847, 224
- FIPS code: 17-51089
- Wikimedia Commons: Mount Prospect, Illinois
- Website: mountprospect.org

Mount Prospect is a village in Cook County, Illinois, United States. It is part of Elk Grove and Wheeling townships, about 20 miles (32 km) northwest of downtown Chicago and approximately 4 miles (6.4 km) north of O'Hare International Airport. As of the 2020 census, the village had a total population of 56,852.

== Geography ==
Mount Prospect is located at 42°3′56″N 87°56′10″W (42.065427, -87.936217).

According to the 2021 census gazetteer files, Mount Prospect has a total area of 10.76 square miles (27.87 km^{2}), of which 10.72 square miles (27.76 km^{2}) (or 99.65%) is land and 0.04 square miles (0.10 km^{2}) (or 0.35%) is water.

=== Places of interest ===
- Randhurst Village
- Mount Prospect Village Hall

=== Climate ===
Mount Prospect, Illinois

Climate chart (precipitation, max. and min. temperature)
J	F	M	A	M	J	J	A	S	O	N	D
1.8 30 14	1.6 35 19	2.7 46 29	3.7 58 38	3.4 70 47	3.6 79 57	3.5 84 63	4.6 81 62	3.3 74 54	2.7 62 42	3 47 32	2.4 34 20
- █ Average max. and min. temperatures in °F
- █ Precipitation totals in inches
- Source: Historic Average Mount Prospect
Metric conversion
J	F	M	A	M	J	J	A	S	O	N	D
44 −1 −10	41 2 −7	67 8 −2	93 14 3	86 21 8	92 26 14	89 29 17	117 27 17	83 23 12	69 17 6	76 8 0	62 1 −7
- █ Average max. and min. temperatures in °C
- █ Precipitation totals in mm

According to the Köppen climate classification system, Mount Prospect lies within the Humid continental climate zone (or Dfa) in the warm summer type. The village experiences warm to hot and humid summers and frigid, snowy winters. The village lies within U.S.D.A Hardiness zone 5b, along the fringe of zone 6a.

== Demographics ==
Historical population
Census	Pop.	Note	%±
1920	349		—
1930	1,225		251.0%
1940	1,720		40.4%
1950	4,009		133.1%
1960	18,906		371.6%
1970	34,995		85.1%
1980	52,634		50.4%
1990	53,170		1.0%
2000	56,265		5.8%
2010	54,167		−3.7%
2020	56,852		5.0%
U.S. Decennial Census; 2010 2020

=== Racial and ethnic composition ===
Mount Prospect village, Illinois – Racial and ethnic composition Note: the US Census treats Hispanic/Latino as an ethnic category. This table excludes Latinos from the racial categories and assigns them to a separate category. Hispanics/Latinos may be of any race.
Race / Ethnicity (NH = Non-Hispanic)	Pop 2000	Pop 2010	Pop 2020	% 2000	% 2010	% 2020
White alone (NH)	41,548	37,355	36,463	73.84%	68.96%	64.14%
Black or African American alone (NH)	979	1,230	1,459	1.74%	2.27%	2.57%
Native American or Alaska Native alone (NH)	41	47	30	0.07%	0.09%	0.05%
Asian alone (NH)	6,276	6,312	8,192	11.15%	11.65%	14.41%
Pacific Islander alone (NH)	24	11	15	0.04%	0.02%	0.03%
Other race alone (NH)	43	66	169	0.08%	0.12%	0.30%
Mixed race or Multiracial (NH)	734	738	1,338	1.30%	1.36%	2.35%
Hispanic or Latino (any race)	6,620	8,408	9,186	11.77%	15.52%	16.16%
Total	56,265	54,167	56,852	100.00%	100.00%	100.00%

=== 2020 census ===
As of the 2020 census, Mount Prospect had a population of 56,852. The population density was 5,285.12 inhabitants per square mile (2,040.60/km^{2}). The median age was 40.7 years; 22.3% of residents were under the age of 18 and 17.7% of residents were 65 years of age or older. For every 100 females there were 96.5 males, and for every 100 females age 18 and over there were 94.3 males age 18 and over.

100.0% of residents lived in urban areas, while 0.0% lived in rural areas.

There were 21,810 households and 15,043 families in Mount Prospect. Of all households, 32.3% had children under the age of 18 living in them, 55.2% were married-couple households, 16.1% were households with a male householder and no spouse or partner present, and 24.1% were households with a female householder and no spouse or partner present. About 25.4% of all households were made up of individuals and 12.5% had someone living alone who was 65 years of age or older. There were 22,835 housing units at an average density of 2,122.80 per square mile (819.62/km^{2}), of which 4.5% were vacant. The homeowner vacancy rate was 1.3% and the rental vacancy rate was 7.2%.

=== Income and poverty ===
The median income for a household in the village was $84,353, and the median income for a family was $103,946. Males had a median income of $57,695 versus $41,193 for females. The per capita income for the village was $40,452. About 3.7% of families and 5.8% of the population were below the poverty line, including 4.9% of those under age 18 and 8.4% of those age 65 or over.

=== Quality of life ===
In 2008, Mount Prospect was voted the best city in which to raise children.

== Economy ==
Companies based in Mount Prospect include Cummins Allison, NTN USA and Rauland-Borg.

The former United Airlines headquarters in Elk Grove Township was annexed into Mount Prospect in the 2010s.

=== Top employers ===
According to the Village's 2025 Comprehensive Annual Financial Report, the top employers in the city are:

#	Employer	# of Employees
1	CVS Caremark	655
2	Robert Bosch Tool Corporation	650
3	Village of Mount Prospect	334
4	Mount Prospect School District 57	326
5	Township High School No. 214	300
6	Rauland-Borg	300
7	Costco	277
8	Wal-Mart	271
9	School District 59	266
10	TJX Companies	201

== Education ==
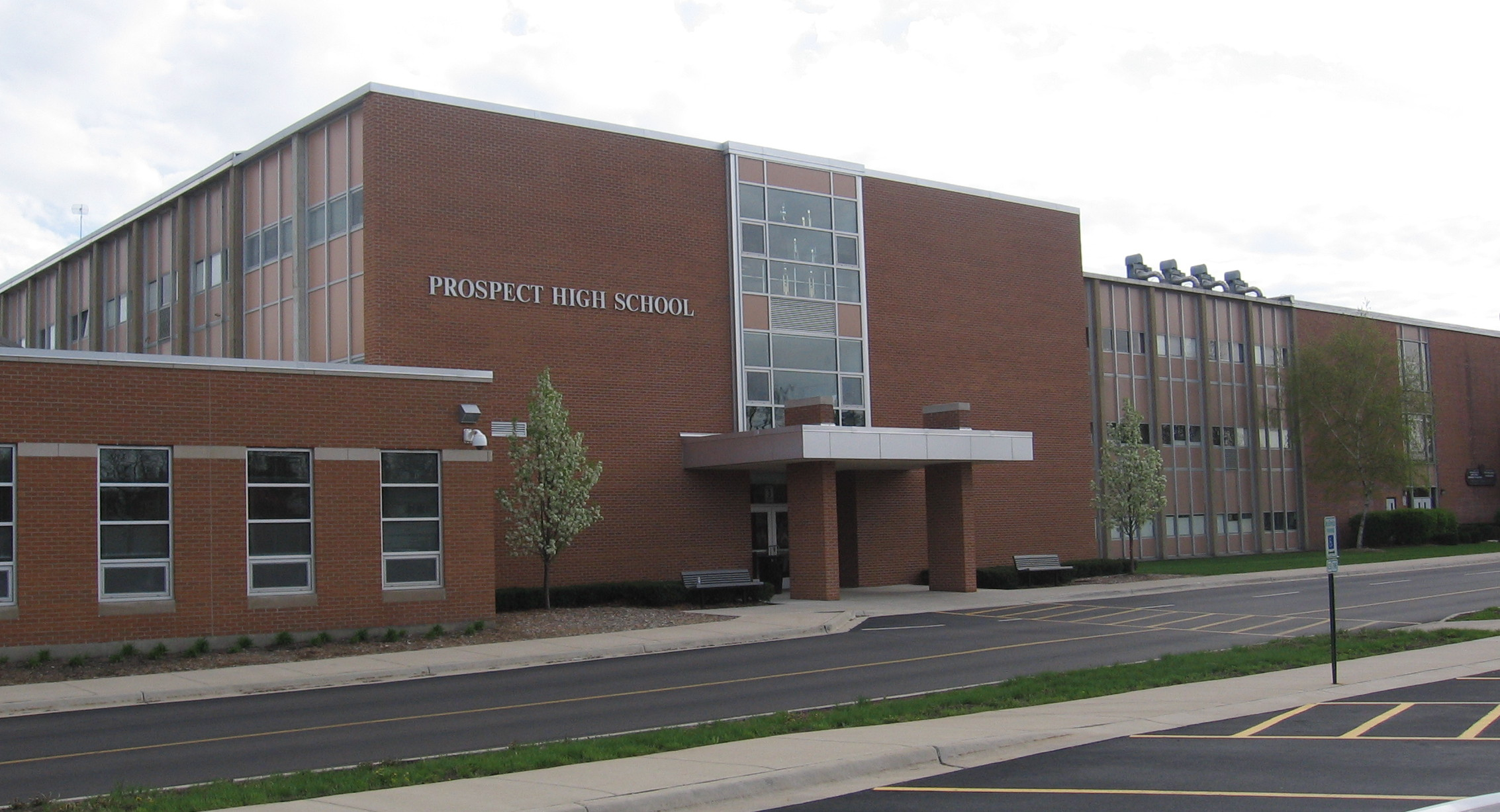
Prospect High School

Mount Prospect has a number of award-winning school districts. It has multiple districts that serve the village. Central Mount Prospect is served by Mount Prospect School District 57. North (and somewhat east) Mount Prospect is served by River Trails School District 26. South (and somewhat west) Mount Prospect is served by Elk Grove Community Consolidated School District 59. A very small portion of northern Mount Prospect in its northernmost point is served by Buffalo Grove-Wheeling Community Consolidated District 21. A small part of north central Mount Prospect is also served by Arlington Heights School District 25. A small part of northwest Mount Prospect is served by Prospect Heights School District 23.

Township High School District 214 includes all of the area of Mount Prospect; the town is served by multiple high schools. Prospect High School is the only one located within the village. Small numbers of students attend Elk Grove High School and Buffalo Grove High School.

The two Catholic parochial schools (K-8) of the Roman Catholic Archdiocese of Chicago located within Mount Prospect are St. Raymond and St. Emily.

The schools that service Mount Prospect are:

Mount Prospect District 57

- Westbrook School for Young Learners (PK–1)
- Fairview Elementary School (2–5)
- Lions Park Elementary School (2–5)
- Lincoln Middle School (6–8)

River Trails District 26

- Euclid Elementary School (K–5)
- Indian Grove Elementary School (K–5)
- River Trails Middle School (6–8)

Elk Grove Community Consolidated District 59

- Robert Frost Elementary School (K–5)
- Friendship Junior High School (6–8; located in Des Plaines)
- Forest View Elementary School (K–5)
- John Jay Elementary School (K–5)
- Holmes Junior High School (6–8)

Arlington Heights School District 25

- Windsor Elementary School (K–5; located in Arlington Heights)
- Dryden Elementary School (K–5; located in Arlington Heights)
- South Middle School (6–8; located in Arlington Heights)

Prospect Heights School District 23

- Betsy Elementary School (2–3; located in Prospect Heights)
- Anne Sullivan Elementary School (3–5; located in Prospect Heights)
- Dwight D. Eisenhower Elementary School (Pre-K-1; located in Prospect Heights)
- MacArthur Middle School (6–8; located in Prospect Heights)

Buffalo Grove–Wheeling Community Consolidated District 21

- Robert Frost Elementary School (K–5)
- Oliver Holmes Middle School (6–8; located in Wheeling)

Township High School District 214

- Prospect High School (9–12)
- John Hersey High School (9–12)
- Rolling Meadows High School (9–12)
- Wheeling High School (9–12)
- Buffalo Grove High School (9–12)
- Elk Grove High School (9–12)

Private schools

- St. Raymond School (K–8, Catholic)
- St. Emily School (K–8, Catholic)
- St. Paul Lutheran Church and School (K–8, Lutheran)
- Science Academy of Chicago
- Alexander G. Bell Montessori School - Wheeling
- St. Viator Catholic High School (Catholic) - Arlington Heights

=== Libraries ===
- Mount Prospect Public Library

== Parks and recreation ==
Multiple park districts serve the town: Mount Prospect, Arlington Heights, Des Plaines, Prospect Heights, and River Trails.

== Transportation ==
The Mount Prospect station provides Metra commuter rail service along the Union Pacific Northwest Line. Trains travel southeast to Ogilvie Transportation Center in Chicago, and northwest to either Harvard station or McHenry station. Bus service in the village is provided by Pace.

== Notable people ==
- John Ankerberg, Christian evangelist
- Bruce Boxleitner, actor and science-fiction writer, best known for roles in TV series Babylon 5 and Scarecrow and Mrs. King and films Tron and Tron: Legacy; attended Prospect High School
- Ian Brennan, co-creator of Glee and Scream Queens; Prospect High School alumni
- Lee DeWyze, winner of American Idol Season 9; attended Prospect High School
- Brian Gregory, men's basketball coach at University of South Florida, Dayton and Georgia Tech; born in Mount Prospect
- Terry Moran, ABC News Senior National Correspondent; grew up in Mount Prospect and Barrington Hills
- Dave Kingman, 3-time MLB All-Star outfielder for Chicago Cubs, San Francisco Giants, New York Mets; attended Prospect High School
- Tom Lundstedt, baseball player, (Chicago Cubs, Minnesota Twins); attended Prospect High School
- Phil Masi, baseball player (Boston Braves, Chicago White Sox); died in Mount Prospect
- Timothy Miller, director of PR, Columbus Crew SC; attended St. Raymond School
- Jennifer Morrison, actress (House, Once Upon a Time, Star Trek Into Darkness); attended Prospect High School
- Pari Pantazopoulos, professional soccer player (Chicago Fire); attended Prospect High School
- Ed Paschke, highly acclaimed artist, a leader in the Chicago Imagist style; attended Arlington High School
- John Ratcliffe, U.S. Director of National Intelligence
- David J. Regner, Illinois state legislator and businessman; lived in Mount Prospect
- Beth Walker, Justice of the West Virginia Supreme Court of Appeals, born in Mount Prospect
- Ben Weasel, lead singer and guitarist of band Screeching Weasel
- Karen Zambos, clothing designer; attended Wheeling High School
- David Kendziera, US Olympic athlete in the 400m hurdles
