= Don Caneva =

American musician (1936–2008)

Donald Earnest Caneva (October 10, 1936 – August 29, 2008) was an American internationally renowned, third generation band director, conductor, music editor, festival founder and band music educator.

== Early life and education ==
Donald Earnest Caneva was born in Lockport, Illinois. He graduated from DePaul University with a Bachelor of Music Education degree and from the University of Hawaii with a Master of Arts degree.

He died on August 29, 2008, in San Diego, California.

== Career ==
=== John Hersey High School Bands ===
Early in his career he created the internationally renowned band program of the John Hersey High School (Hersey) in Arlington Heights, Illinois. During his time, the Hersey Bands were privileged to perform with some of the "giants" in the music field, including Frederick Fennell, Carmen Dragon, Arthur Fiedler, Rafael Mendez and Doc Severinsen. During his 10-year tenure at Hersey, his bands brought home an unprecedented over 100 first place awards. The Hersey Bands also competed internationally and won the Canadian Manisphere Total Band Competition. Caneva's Hersey Marching Band also performed at numerous prestigious events which included the Cotton Bowl Parade, Orange Bowl Parade, Tournament of Roses Parade, and the College All-Star Game. The band was dubbed the "Pride of Illinois" in striving for excellence. The Hersey Band's excellence was recognized through placement on the John Philip Sousa Foundation's Roll of Honor of Historic High School Concert Bands.

While working at Hersey Bands, Caneva began his international work by becoming the Executive Secretary of Band Competition for the renowned international Canadian Manisphere Band Competition, which features a hybrid competition using both a school’s the concert and marching bands. Caneva immediately added excellence to the competition with 28 major changes.

==== Arthur Fiedler and the Hersey Bands Concerts ====
In rare performances, Arthur Fiedler directed two concerts with Canvas’s Hersey Bands, one on January 26, 1971, and then later on April 4, 1972. First getting Fiedler’s acceptance to conduct the Hersey Bands took Caneva’s ingenuity and excellence in quality performance. Caneva said, "When I first approached Fiedler, he didn't seem too interested but he asked me to send him pictures, recordings and other pertinent information about the band. I was tremendously pleased and delighted when he said he would accept our invitation, after hearing a recent recording of the band." In the first performance, Fiedler conducted the Symphonic Winds performing "William Tell Overture" by Gioachino Rossini and other works, including the novelty, "Instant Concert" by Harold Walters. In the final 1972 performance the band opened the Symphonic Winds portion of the concert with the "Festive Overture" by Dmitri Shostakovich, followed with the "American Salute" by Morton Gould. For the conclusion of this portion, Fiedler chose "The Finale From The New World Symphony" by Anton Dvorak. He also conducted Leroy Anderson's "Serenata" with the high school band.

==== Recordings ====
As a soloist, Doc Severinsen recorded four rare separate albums with Caneva’s John Hersey High School Symphonic Band titled: Silver Anniversary Starring Doc Severinsen & the John Hersey Symphonic Winds - 1974, Doc's Concert -1974, "Doc" '76, and John Hersey High School Bands Present Doc Severinsen -1978

=== Music leadership ===
At age 39, he was one of the youngest band directors to be elected to membership in the American Bandmasters Association (ABA). He served on the ABA's International Relations and Enrichment Committees, and as chairman of the ABA Foundation. Additionally, he served as the ABA Chairman of the Sudler Committee. He founded the World of Music Festivals, which for over 25 years held competitive music festivals for junior and senior high school bands, orchestras, and choirs throughout the United States.

He was appointed Director of the Coastal Communities Concert Band in Encinitas, California, in 1987. The 80-plus member concert band that traveled extensively to destinations such as Hawaii, Switzerland, Austria, and Italy. The band won many prestigious awards, including the "Sudler Silver Scroll Award" from the John Philip Sousa Foundation (1998), and the Gold Prize at the International Alpine Music Festival in Switzerland (2001). In 2007 the documentary film "Community Band - Our Lives in Music" was produced in association with the Coastal Communities Concert Band. The film highlights the band and its members with behind-the scenes stories of passion, dedication, commitment, and hope. It won an Emmy Award.

== Song Paean commissioned in memory to Caneva ==
In memory of Don Caneva and his father Earnest Caneva, the 2012 song Paean was commissioned by John Hersey High School, Ball State University, Lockport Township High School, and Coastal Communities Concert Bands. Written by Steven Bryant (composer) it pays tribute to these men and their years of accomplishments as bandleaders.
