= Tom Lundstedt =

American baseball player (born 1949)

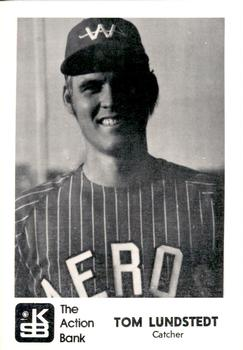
- Catcher
- Born: April 10, 1949 (age 77); Davenport, Iowa, U.S.
- Batted: Switch Threw: Right

MLB debut
- August 31, 1973, for the Chicago Cubs

Last MLB appearance
- September 28, 1975, for the Minnesota Twins

MLB statistics
- Batting average: .092
- Home runs: 0
- Runs batted in: 1
- Stats at Baseball Reference

Teams
- Chicago Cubs (1973–74); Minnesota Twins (1975)

Thomas Robert Lundstedt (born April 10, 1949) is an American former professional baseball player who played in the Major Leagues primarily as a catcher from 1973 to 1975. He played at Prospect High School in Mt. Prospect, Illinois and the University of Michigan. He was originally drafted by the Los Angeles Dodgers in the 65th round of the 1967 Major League Baseball draft but did not sign. He was later drafted by the Chicago Cubs in the 1st round of the 1970 Major League Baseball draft and signed on June 9, 1970. After playing in 26 games in two seasons with the Cubs, he was traded to the Minnesota Twins on December 6, 1974 in exchange for Mike Adams. He played in 18 games with the Twins in 1975.
