= Rolling Meadows High School =

Location
- 2901 Central Rd. Rolling Meadows, Illinois 60008; United States; 42.065°N 88.0159°W

Information
- Other names: RMHS
- School type: public secondary
- Opened: 1971
- School district: Twp. HS District 214
- Superintendent: Scott Rowe
- Principal: Megan Kelly
- Faculty: 230
- Teaching staff: 124.90 (FTE)
- Grades: 9—12
- Gender: coed
- Enrollment: 2,067 (2023-2024)
- Student to teacher ratio: 16.55
- Campus: suburban
- Colours: purple white gold
- Fight song: Across the Field
- Athletics conference: Mid-Suburban League (MSL)
- Mascot: Milo the Mustang
- Nickname: Mustangs
- Publication: REBUS
- Newspaper: The Pacer
- Yearbook: The Yearling
- Website: School website

Rolling Meadows High School, RMHS, is a public four-year high school located in Rolling Meadows, Illinois, a northwest suburb of Chicago, Illinois, in the United States. It is part of Township High School District 214, the second largest high school district in Illinois, after Township High School District 211. The other five schools include Buffalo Grove High School, Elk Grove High School, John Hersey High School, Prospect High School, and Wheeling High School. It serves primarily central and east Rolling Meadows (east of Route 53), a significant part of Arlington Heights and a small part of Mount Prospect. Its feeder schools are South Middle School, Holmes Junior High School, Carl Sandburg Junior High School, and Our Lady of the Wayside, a private Catholic school.

Rolling Meadows High School first opened for the 1971-1972 school year.

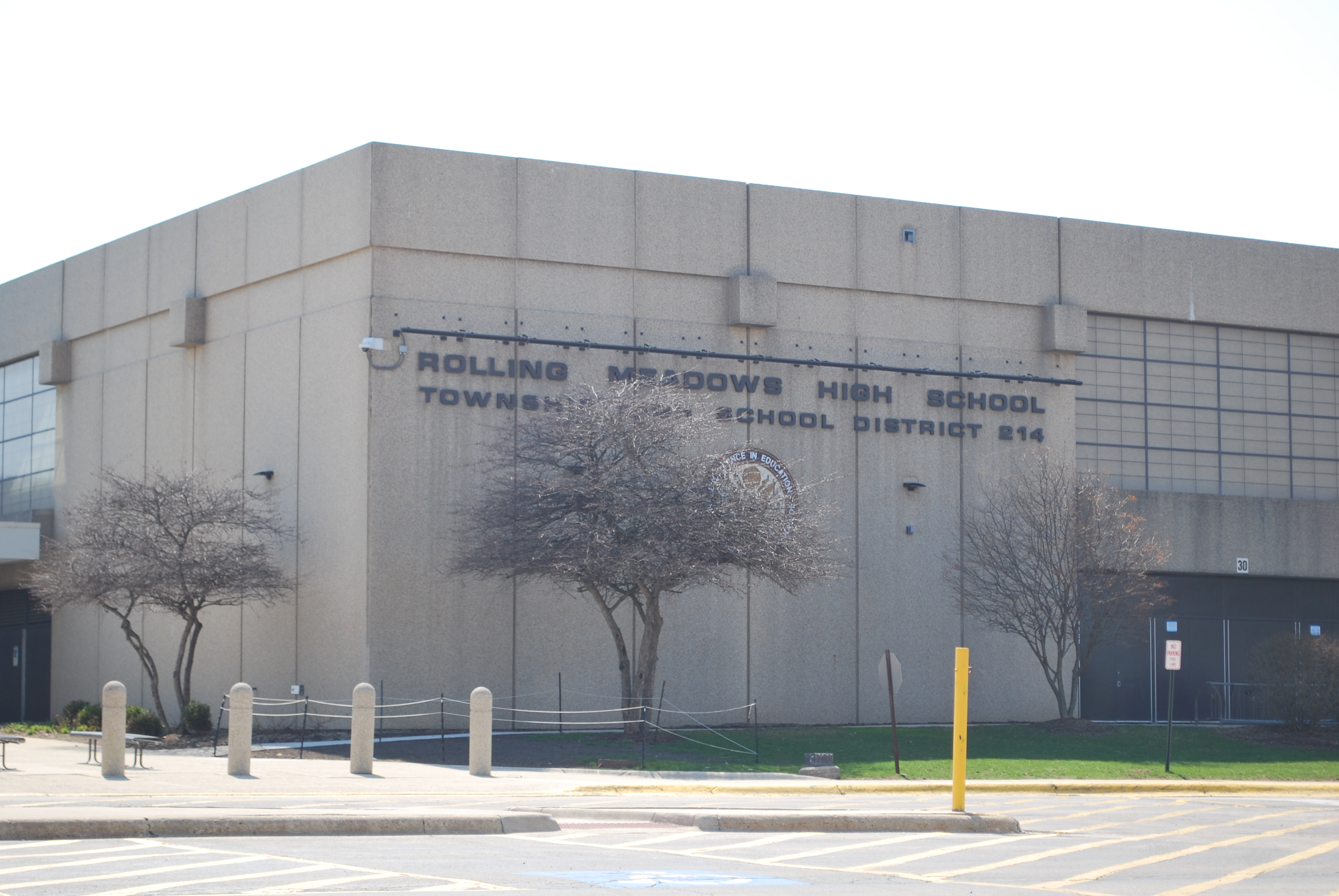
Rolling Meadows High School Exterior

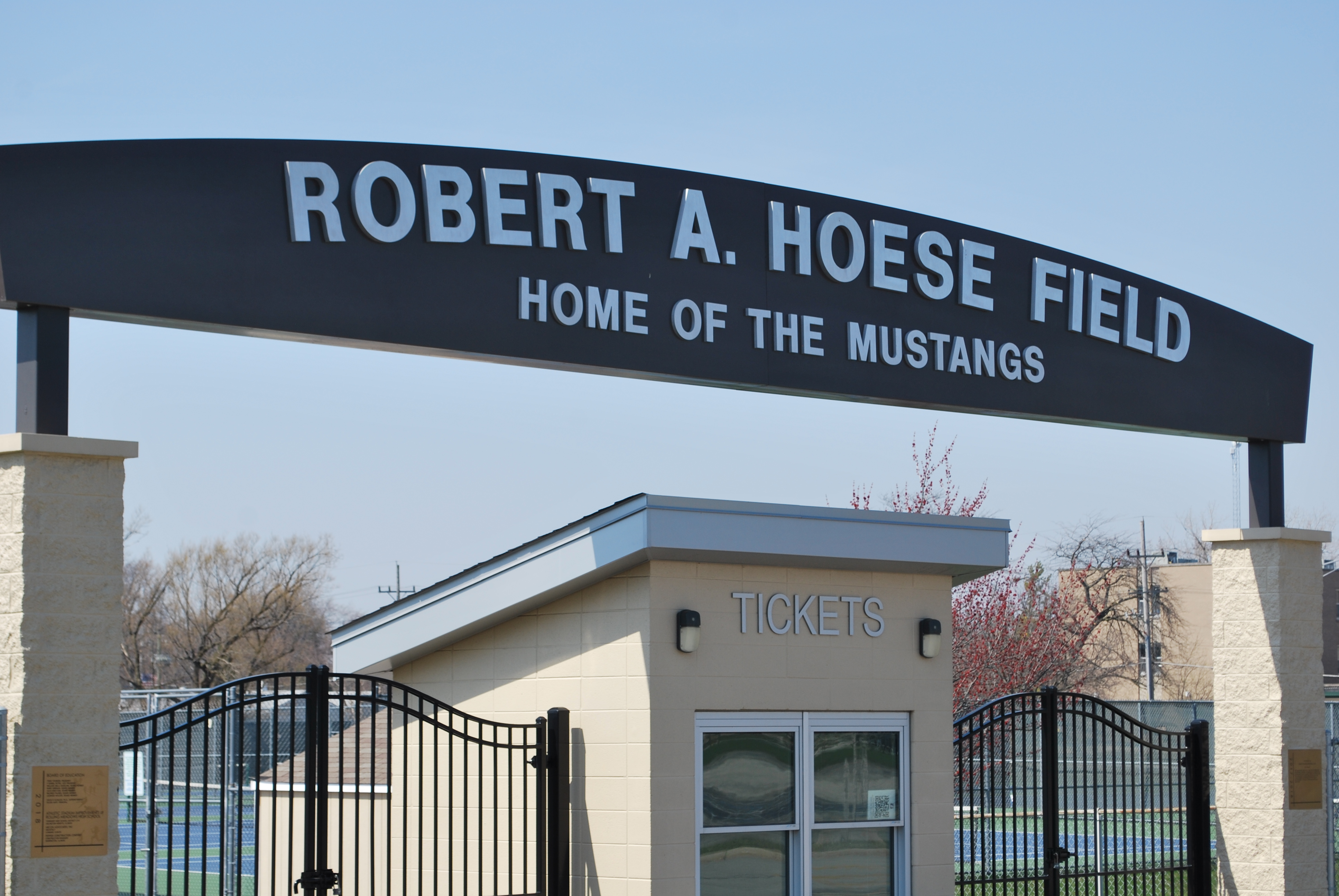
Robert A. Hoese Field

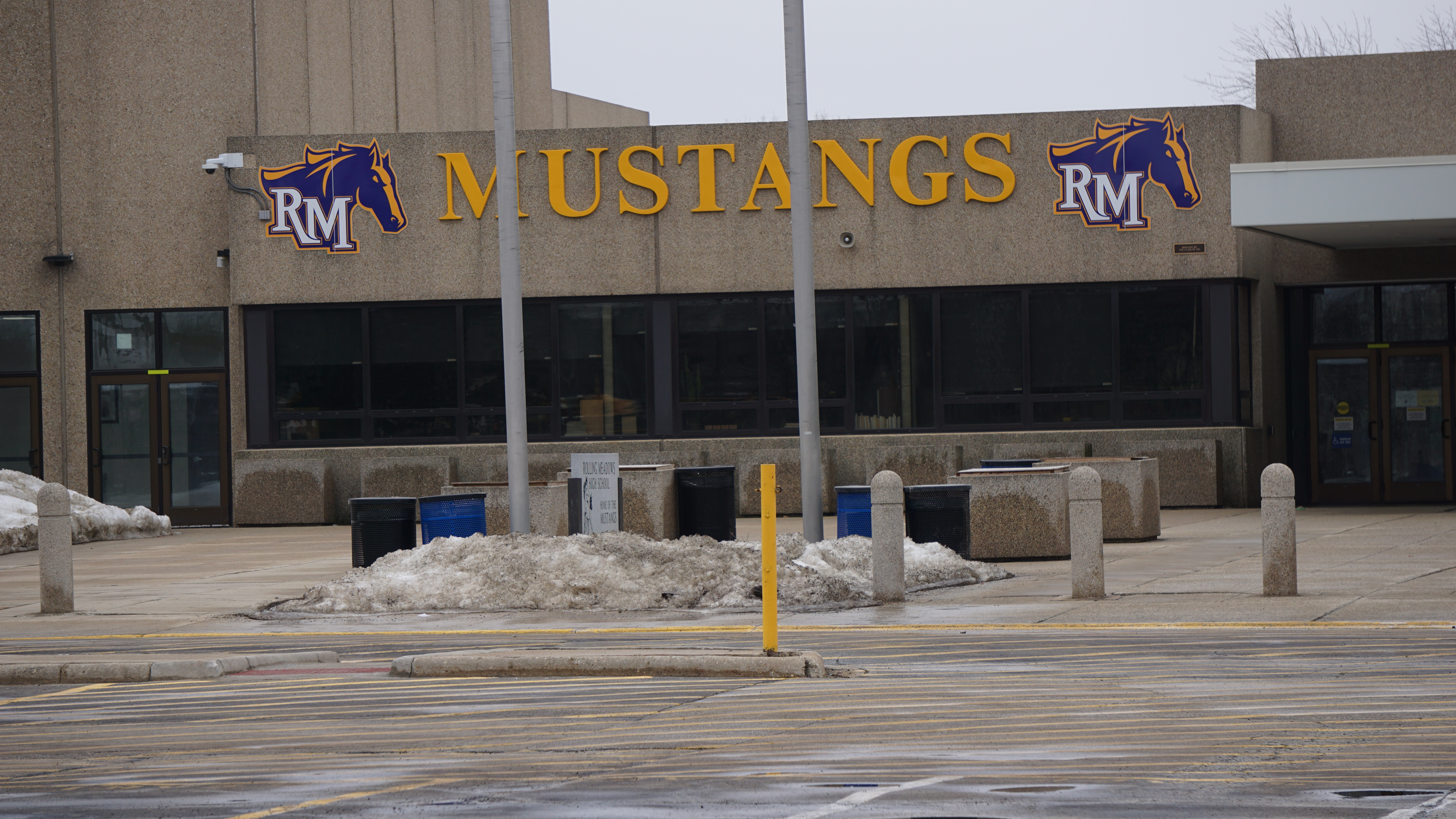
Rolling Meadows High School

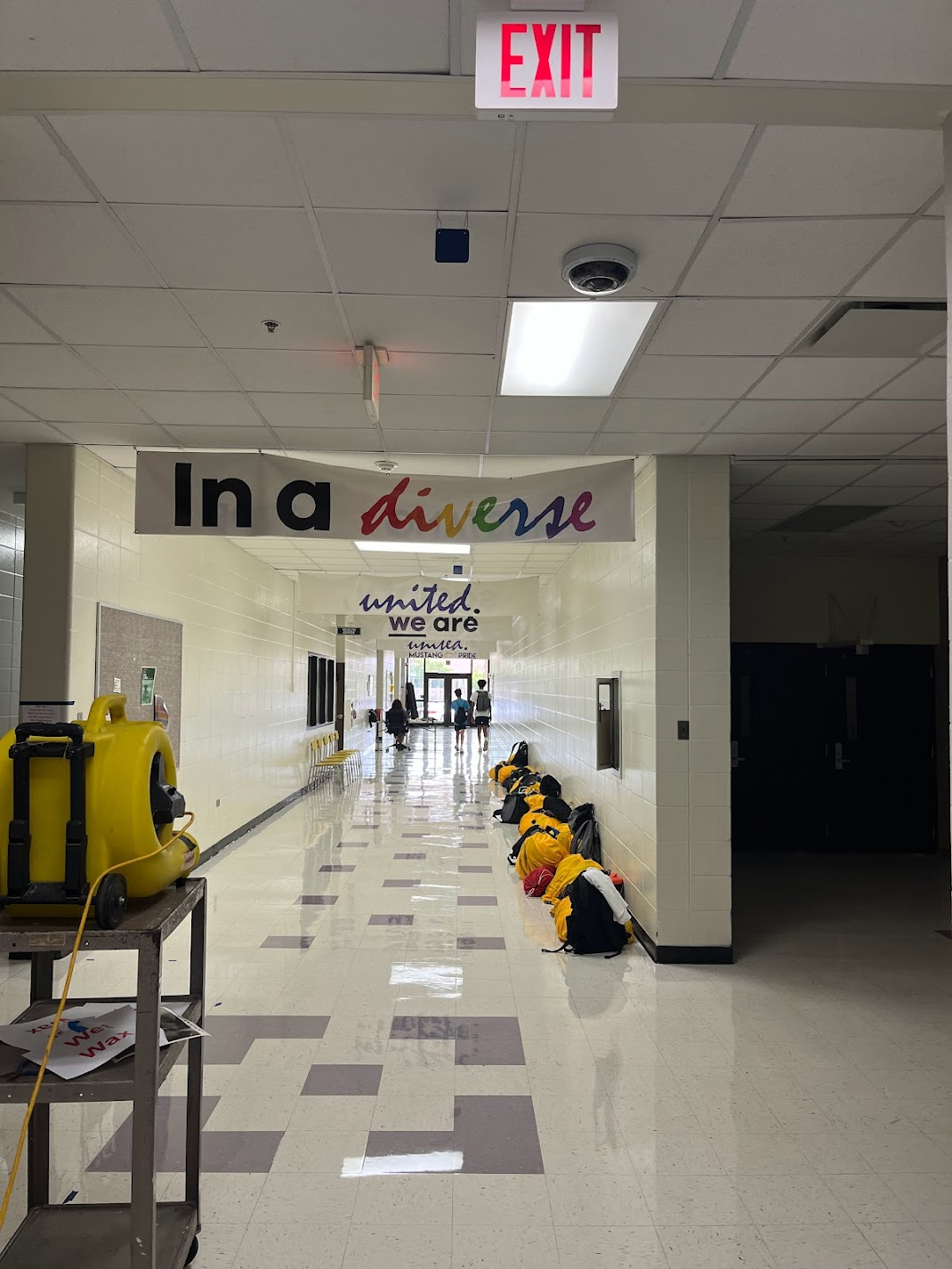
“In a diverse society we are united” RMHS display of diversity.

== Demographics ==
As of 2023, the school's student body is 48.1% White, 36.9% Hispanic, 7.7% Asian, 3.8% Black, and 3.3% two or more races.

== Academics ==
Rolling Meadows High School is designated as a "Blue Ribbon School" by the U.S. Department of Education. 10.8% of students as of 2014 met State Test performance Index minimum educational standards. It is listed as one of the top 1000 high schools in all of the United States and a lower teacher to student ratio than surrounding schools in the district.

Rolling Meadows High School offers 28 Advanced Placement courses. In 2012, 38% of students were enrolled in an AP course, up from 21% in 2010. The AP Exam Pass Rate of a score of 3 or better is at 78%. As of 2019, 55.8% of students were taking one or more early college courses such as AP and dual-credit. In 2020, Rolling Meadows High School had a graduation rate of 91%, higher than the state average of 88%.

Rolling Meadows High School also offers Career and Technical Education (CTE) courses through a career pathways program which, "prepare[s] students for the workplace by building academic, vocational, career planning, and citizenship skills." Some of the CTE pathways include aerospace engineering, automotive technician, early childhood education, nutrition and culinary arts, cosmetology, and nursing assistant, among others.

== Athletics ==
Rolling Meadows competes in the Mid-Suburban League (MSL) East Conference and Illinois High School Association (IHSA). Its mascot is a mustang.

The school sponsors interscholastic teams for boys and girls in basketball, cross country, golf, gymnastics, soccer, swimming & diving, tennis, track & field, volleyball, and water polo. The school has a collection of all state athletes in every sport offered. Boys may also compete in baseball, football, and wrestling. Girls may compete in badminton, bowling, cheerleading, and softball. The school also sponsors a hockey team along with Prospect High School, and Elk Grove High School. The team plays their home games at Mount Prospect Ice Arena.

The following athletic teams have won their respective state championship series sponsored by the IHSA.

- Archery (girls): State Champions (1977—78, 1979–80)

Archery was only contested for four years. Rolling Meadows was the only team to win two state titles, and the only school to finish in the top four each year.

== Notable alumni ==
- Jeff Austin was a professional musician, best known for his work with Yonder Mountain String Band.
- Jay Bennett was an American multi-instrumentalist, engineer, producer, and singer-songwriter, best known as a member of the band Wilco from 1994 to 2001.
- Cam Christie (2023) is a professional basketball player with the Los Angeles Clippers;
- Max Christie (2021) is a professional basketball player with the Dallas Mavericks;
- Gary Cole is an actor known for his work in film (In the Line of Fire, The Brady Bunch Movie, Office Space) and television (Fatal Vision, Midnight Caller, Harvey Birdman, Attorney at Law, Veep, NCIS).
- Jimmy Garoppolo is a professional football player for the Los Angeles Rams.
- Greg Garrison is a professional musician, best known for his work with Leftover Salmon, Punch Brothers, and Mighty Poplar.
- Sebastian Maniscalco is an American stand-up comedian.
- Tim McIlrath is the lead singer/rhythm guitarist of the American rock band Rise Against.
- Brian Schmack (1991) is a former professional baseball player with the Detroit Tigers; current head baseball coach at Valparaiso University.
- Daniel Sobkowicz (2021) is a college football wide receiver for the Illinois State Redbirds
- Aaron Williams was a professional basketball player, playing in the NBA (1993–2008).

== Notable staff ==
- Jim Lindeman is a former Major League Baseball player. (retired in 2023)
- Robbie Gould, hired in 2024 as Varsity Head Football coach. Former NFL kicker and Chicago Bear.
