= Wheeling Community Consolidated School District 21 =

School district in Wheeling, Illinois

Community Consolidated School District 21

Address
- 959 W Dundee Rd Wheeling, Illinois, 60090; United States
- Coordinates: 42.1389°N 87.9425°W

District information
- Type: Public
- Motto: Empowering every student, every day.
- Grades: Early childhood-8
- Superintendent: Michael Connolly
- Asst. superintendent(s): Kim Cline, Michael Debartolo, Robert Gurney, Rosemarie Meyer, Jacob Heald
- School board: 7 members
- Chair of the board: Phil Pritzker
- Governing agency: Illinois State Board of Education
- Schools: Early childhood 1, Elementary 9, Middle 3
- Budget: $146 million (2019-2020)
- NCES District ID: 1742210

Students and staff
- Students: 6,215 (2018-2019)
- Teachers: 430 (2018-2019)
- Staff: 299 (2018-2019)
- Student–teacher ratio: 17:1 (2018-2019)

Other information
- Website: www.ccsd21.org

Wheeling Community Consolidated School District 21 (CCSD21) is a school district headquartered in Wheeling, Illinois in the Chicago metropolitan area. It serves most of Wheeling and surrounding communities, such as Buffalo Grove, Arlington Heights, Mount Prospect and Prospect Heights. As of 2006, there are ten elementary schools in the district and three middle schools. District 21 feeds secondary schools within Township High School District 214, such as Buffalo Grove High School and Wheeling High School.

== Schools ==
School name	Address	Principal	Number of Students
Poe Elementary School	2800 N. Highland Avenue, Arlington Heights IL 60004	Stephanie Stallman	404
Kilmer Elementary School	655 Golfview Terrace, Buffalo Grove IL 60089	Colleen Goodrich	565
Longfellow Elementary School	501 S. Arlington Heights Road, Buffalo Grove IL 60089	Emily Gary	409
Riley Elementary School	1209 Burr Oak Drive, Arlington Heights IL 60004	Nicole Bellini	278
Field Elementary School	51 St. Armand Lane, Wheeling IL 60090	Crystal Jimenez	541
Tarkington Elementary School	310 Scott Street, Wheeling IL 60090	Joe Arduino	427
Twain Elementary School	515 E. Merle Lane, Wheeling IL 60090	Alyssa Shlensky	471
Whitman Elementary School	133 S. Wille Avenue, Wheeling IL 60090	Jorge Almodovar	481
Frost Elementary School	1805 Aspen Drive, Mount Prospect IL 60056	Catherine Joy	504
Hawthorne Early Childhood School	200 Glendale Avenue, Wheeling IL 60090	Holly Harper-Kelly	N/A
Cooper Middle School	1050 Plum Grove Circle, Buffalo Grove IL 60089	David DeMuth	661
London Middle School	1001 W. Dundee Road, Wheeling IL 60090	Anastasia Netzel	666
Holmes Middle School	221 Wolf Road, Wheeling IL 60090	Jenny Lagunas	719

- Figures are current as of 2025

== Elected Officials ==
- Jessica Riddick, Board President
- Debbi McAtee, Board Vice President
- Carrie Devitt, Board Secretary
- Arlen Gould, Member
- Bill Harrison, Member
- Iliana Guzman, Member
- Angelika Husmann, Member
