= John Hersey High School =

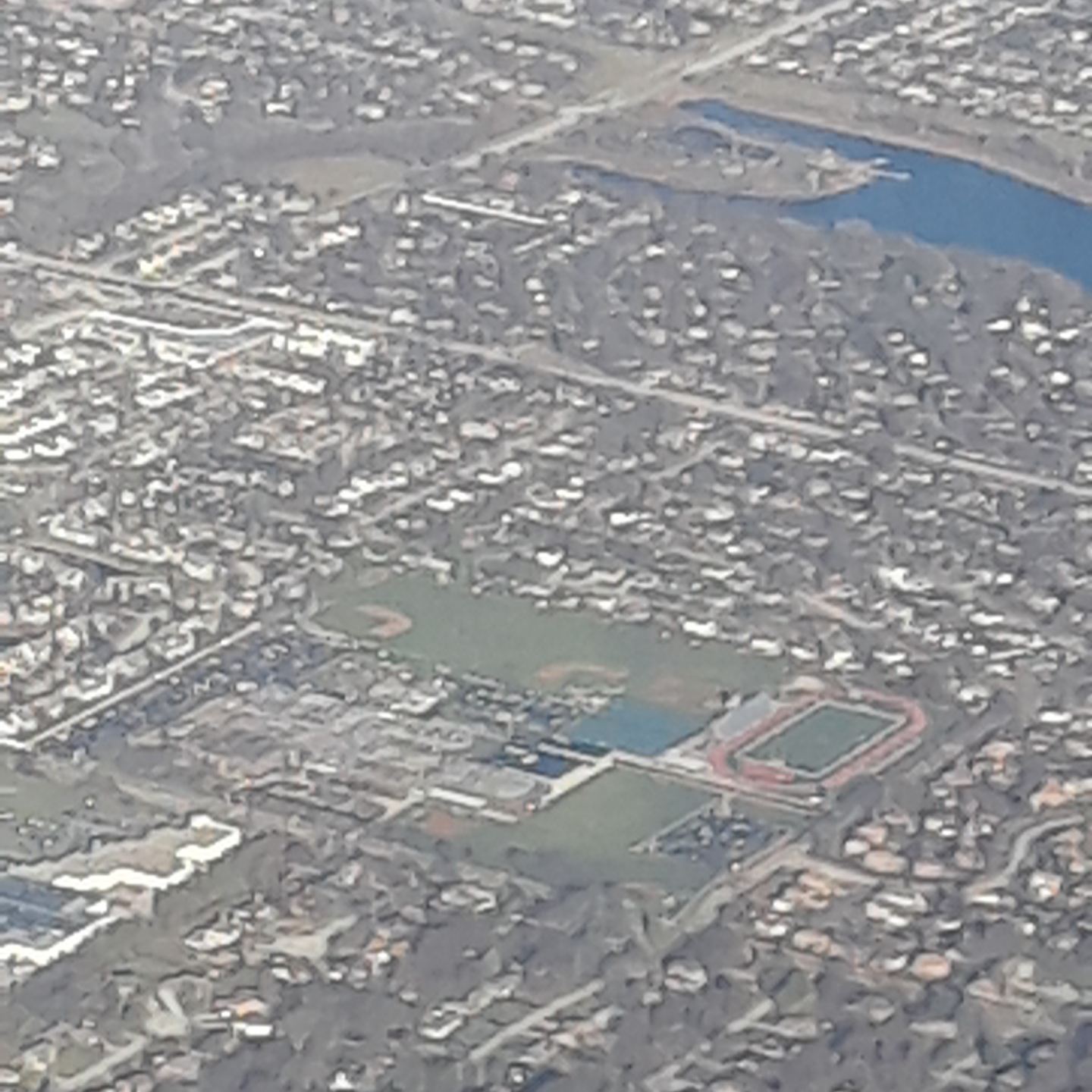

Location
- 1900 East Thomas Street; Arlington Heights, Illinois 60004; United States; 42°06′14″N 87°57′34″W

Information
- School type: Public high school
- Opened: 1968
- School district: Twp. H.S. District 214
- Superintendent: David Schuler
- Principal: Heath McFaul
- Faculty: 193
- Teaching staff: 123.60 (FTE)
- Grades: 9–12
- Gender: coed
- Enrollment: 2,035 (2023–2024)
- Average class size: 17.7
- Student to teacher ratio: 16.46
- Campus: Suburban
- Colours: orange, Brown, and white
- Athletics conference: Mid-Suburban League
- Mascot: Husky
- Nickname: Huskies
- Newspaper: The Correspondent
- Yearbook: The Endeavor
- Website: www.d214.org/o/jhhs

John Hersey High School (also referred to as Hersey or JHHS) is a four-year public high school located in Arlington Heights, Illinois, a northwest suburb of Chicago in the United States. It enrolls students from Arlington Heights as well as parts of Prospect Heights and Mount Prospect. The attendance zone also includes small portions of Des Plaines and Glenview which lack residents. Named after American writer John Hersey, it is part of Township High School District 214 which also includes Buffalo Grove High School, Elk Grove High School, Prospect High School, Rolling Meadows High School, and Wheeling High School.

== Feeder schools ==
Public middle schools whose graduates usually attend Hersey include Thomas Middle School, MacArthur Middle School and River Trails Middle School. JHHS also receives students from several private schools such as Quest Academy, St. James School, St. Alphonsus Liguori Catholic School, St. Emily Catholic School, St. Paul Lutheran School, St. Peter Lutheran School, Our Lady of the Wayside School, Christian Liberty Academy and St. John Brebeuf Catholic School.

== History ==
John Hersey High School was opened in the fall of 1968 in Arlington Heights, Illinois, in order to support the growing population of High School District 214. These towns include Arlington Heights, Buffalo Grove, Mt. Prospect, Prospect Heights and Wheeling. John Hersey High School's colors are orange, brown, and white, and the mascot is the husky. John Hersey High School is one of the few schools in the state that specifically caters to students with special needs. The hard-of-hearing population at JHHS is one of the largest in the area. Hersey also welcomed the CLS (Career and Life Skills) program, formerly housed at Wheeling High School, as part of its school in 2006. JHHS built a new fine arts and fitness section in June 2009.

The Hersey Band's excellence was recognized through placement on the John Philip Sousa Foundation's Roll of Honor of Historic High School Concert Bands. Hersey Bands were founded by band director Don Caneva. During Caneva's ten-year reign at Hersey, his bands brought home over 100 first-place awards.

The Canadian band Rush played a concert at Hersey on their 'Caress Of Steel' tour on November 11, 1975.

A few scenes from the 2010 remake A Nightmare on Elm Street were filmed at Hersey in the first week of May 2009.

== Academics ==
According to U.S. News & World Report, JHHS is ranked as the 1st high school in District 214, the 13th high school in Illinois, and as the 286th high school in the United States in 2019.

Hersey offers 23 AP courses, and 69% of its students will have taken at least one AP Exam by the time of graduation. Hersey is one of the few schools to offer AP Seminar to freshmen. JHHS also offers 82 Career and Technical Education Courses approved by Illinois' CTE Program, including courses in accounting, business, computer programming, construction, engineering, marketing, nutrition, nursing, parenting, and record keeping. Hersey's Fine Arts Department offers courses in art history, band, ceramics, choir, dance, guitar, music theory, orchestra, painting, photography, and theater. French, Spanish, and German are the foreign languages offered to students.

Hersey's student-to-teacher ratio is 17:1, and the average class size is 19 students. The school's graduation rate in 2019 was at 94%.

The class of 2019's average SAT score was 1156.8, placing it higher than District 214's average score of 1076 and Illinois' average score of 994.5. In terms of subject proficiency, 72% of JHHS students are proficient in math, and 78% are proficient in reading. These are the highest proficiency scores in District 214. Hersey has made Adequate Yearly Progress on the Prairie State Achievement Examination, a state test that comprises a part of the No Child Left Behind Act.

== Demographics ==
In the 2022-2023 school year, the school had 2,026 students. 71% of students identified as non-Hispanic white, 13% were Hispanic or Latino, 11% were Asian, 4% were multiracial, and 2% were black or African-American. The school has a student to teacher ratio of 18.9, and 19% of students are eligible for free or reduced price school lunches.

== Activities ==
John Hersey High School won 1st place in the 2007 National Deaf Academic Bowl competition. They won again in 2019.

The Hersey Marching Huskies won the University of Illinois' field competition in 2006 and won the best overall award, the Governor's Trophy in 2009.

The Hersey Symphonic Band was also named the 2017 Honor Band at the 2017 Illinois SuperState competition held annually at the University of Illinois.

== Athletics ==
Hersey High School competes in the Mid-Suburban League (MSL) East Division. JHHS is also a member of the Illinois High School Association (IHSA), which governs most interscholastic athletic and competitive activities in Illinois. Teams from Hersey are stylized as the Huskies. Hersey also keeps records and trophies won by Arlington High School and Forest View High School.

The school sponsors interscholastic teams from both young men and women in basketball, cross country, golf, gymnastics, soccer, swimming & diving, tennis, track & field, volleyball, and water polo. Young men may also compete in baseball, football, and wrestling, while young women may compete in badminton, bowling, cheerleading, dance, and softball. While not sponsored by the IHSA, the school's athletic department also supervises athletes involved in the Special Olympics.

The following teams have won their respective IHSA sponsored state tournament or meet:

- Archery (girls): 1978–79, no longer sponsored by the IHSA
- Football: 1987–88
- Summer Baseball: 1983–84
- Gymnastics (boys): 1973–74, 1983–84
- Gymnastics (girls): 1983–84, 2023–24
- Wrestling: 1970–71, 1971–72
- Soccer (boys): 2024–24

John Hersey High School also co-hosts the Illinois High School Association State Tennis Tournaments for boys and girls.

== Notable alumni ==
- Steve Chen, co-founder of YouTube
- Dave Corzine, former NBA player (1978–91) with the Chicago Bulls
- Bill Glass, American actor, plays Dr. Rick in television commercials
- Brian Gregory, General Manager Phoenix Suns
- Amy Jacobson, news reporter for WIND-AM Chicago
- Jeff Joniak, radio broadcaster, Chicago Bears and WBBM (AM)
- Matteo Lane, American comedian.
- Brad Marek, professional golfer, 2021 PGA Championship
- Marlee Matlin, Academy Award-winning television and film actress
- Jim Michaels, Golden Globe Nominee and NAACP Image Award-winning television producer
- Jacky Rosen, current United States Senator from Nevada
- Ben Weasel (Benjamin Foster), founding member and lead singer of punk band Screeching Weasel
- Frank Kmet, former NFL player, Buffalo Bills
- Tom Nelson, former NFL player, Cincinnati Bengals

== Notable staff ==
- Don Caneva, band director, conductor, music editor, and festival founder. Founder of the Hersey Bands program. The excellence of the Band was recognized on the John Philip Sousa Foundation's Roll of Honor of Historic High School Concert Bands.
