= Rauland-Borg =

American corporation

Rauland
- Industry: Healthcare, Education, Hospitality
- Founded: 1922
- Founder: Norman Rauland
- Headquarters: Mount Prospect, Illinois, USA
- Area served: Worldwide
- Products: Communications, safety and workflow systems for schools and hospitals

Rauland is an American-owned manufacturing company based in Mount Prospect, Illinois, that produces workflow and communications products for hospitals and schools worldwide. Rauland's healthcare product, Responder, is a nurse call system designed for direct patient-to-staff communication, intelligent call routing, and real-time reporting of patient care. Rauland's education product, Telecenter, is a communications platform designed to assist school communications involving emergencies, scheduling and events, and everyday messaging.

== History ==
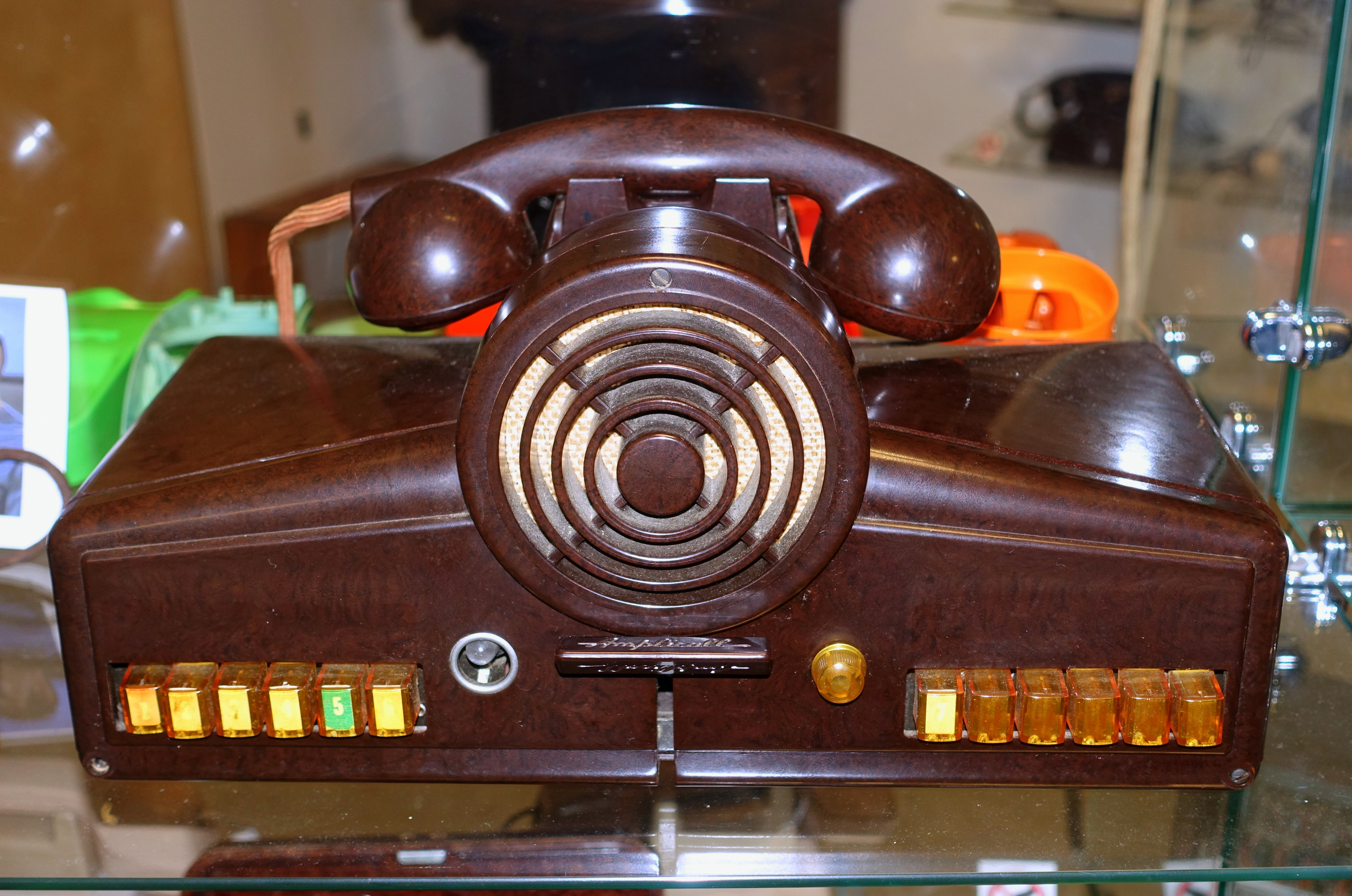
Rauland Amplicall Model 3412 intercom

Rauland was founded in 1922 by inventor E. Norman Rauland. In 1924, he became a pioneer in the radio broadcast industry by launching a Chicago-based radio station, WENR. Throughout the Great Depression, Rauland manufactured power amplifiers and equipment for public address systems and gained various government contracts to produce radio and communication systems for the military.

In 1941, Norman Rauland and George Borg entered a partnership. The Rauland Corporation acquired the Webster-Chicago Corporation, a then-leader in school communications, making Rauland a dominant supplier of internal school communications systems. In 1948, Norm Rauland and George Borg started a new company, Rauland-Borg Corporation, continuing the sound and communications business.

After recognizing the need to keep school instructors and staff in touch with each other, Rauland-Borg introduced the first generation of Telecenter products in 1968. Telecenter was the first-ever commercial application of touch-tone technology.

In 1979, after the acquisition of the Picker-Briggs Company, the manufacturer of the Responder health care communications systems, Rauland-Borg established itself as a leader in nurse call communications.

In 2017, Rauland was acquired by and became a division of AMETEK Inc., a global manufacturer of electronic instruments and electromechanical devices.

Today, Rauland has two distinct communication system product lines: Responder, and Telecenter, which serves the educational market.
