= Anthony Palano =

American football player (born 2005)

No. 1 – Boston College Eagles
- Position: Linebacker
- Class: Junior

Personal information
- Born: December 1, 2005 (age 20)
- Listed height: 6 ft 1 in (1.85 m)
- Listed weight: 230 lb (104 kg)

Career information
- High school: Buffalo Grove (Buffalo Grove, Illinois)
- College: South Dakota State (2024); Washington State (2025); Boston College (2026–present)
- Stats at ESPN

Anthony Palano (born December 1, 2005) is an American college football linebacker for the Boston College Eagles. He previously played for the South Dakota State Jackrabbits and Washington State Cougars.

== Early life ==
Palano attended Buffalo Grove High School in Buffalo Grove, Illinois. As a senior, he totaled more than 1,000 all-purpose yards and 17 touchdowns on offense while recording 65 tackles on defense. Palano committed to South Dakota State University to play college football.

== College career ==
Palano played sparingly as a freshman in 2024 before transferring to Washington State University following the hiring of South Dakota State head coach Jimmy Rogers as the Cougars' head coach. Entering the 2025 season, Palano was named a starter on the Cougars' defense. As a sophomore, he recorded 65 tackles and 0.5 sacks before entering the transfer portal for the second time.

On January 5, 2026, Palano announced his decision to transfer to Boston College to play for the Boston College Eagles. Against Rutgers in the second game of the 2026 season, he recorded one sack, two interceptions, and nine tackles in a 28–21 win. Following the game, Palano was named ACC Linebacker of the Week and Bronko Nagurski National Defensive Player of the Week.
