= Community Consolidated School District 59 =

School district in Elk Grove Village, Illinois, USA

Location
- 1001 Leicester Road Elk Grove Village, Illinois United States

District information
- Motto: Preparing Students to be Successful for Life
- Grades: Pre-K - 8th
- Established: 1947
- Superintendent: Dr. Brett D. Gallini
- Schools: 15

Students and staff
- Students: 5,808
- Staff: 956

Other information
- Website: www.ccsd59.org

Community Consolidated School District 59 (CCSD59) is a school district based in Elk Grove Village, Illinois. The school district serves most of Elk Grove Village while serving parts of Arlington Heights, Mount Prospect, and Des Plaines. The district has 11 elementary schools, 3 junior high schools, and an early learning center. The junior highs schools send their students to Elk Grove High School, Rolling Meadows High School, Prospect High School or Maine West High School. District 59 covers an area of 24 square miles and 75,000 residents in the northwestern suburbs of Chicago.
