= Mount Prospect Public Library =

Library in Illinois, United States

- 42.0656°N 87.9360°W
- Location: 10 S. Emerson Mount Prospect, Illinois 60056
- Established: 1930
- Branches: 1

Collection
- Size: 1,509,362

Access and use
- Circulation: 754,681
- Population served: 61,000 patrons (Library District)

Other information
- Director: Su Reynders
- Employees: 101
- Website: MPPL.org

The Mount Prospect Public Library is a public library located in Mount Prospect, Illinois, United States, a suburb of Chicago.

A staff of 171 full and part-time employees work at the Library, in more than a dozen areas throughout the 101,000-square-foot facility. Currently more than 61,000 patrons are registered cardholders. The collection has over one million items on file, with an annual circulation figure of approximately 750,000.

The Library is governed by a Board of Library Trustees, consisting of seven members, who are elected by the voters of the Village. The Board elects every year from among its members appropriate officers. All members serve without remuneration. Regular meetings of the Board are held in the Library.

== History ==
The library was founded in 1930, with it initially entirely consisting of a small cart at a local school, with it moving into a dedicated brick building later that year. The library later moved again in 1944 and 1946.

A 2002 referendum approved an expansion to the library with a second floor and other improvements, with the renovations completing in 2004.

== Services ==
=== Fiction/AV ===
Fiction books, movies, music, audio and e-books. The Fiction/AV department is located on the second floor of the Library.

=== Teens ===
Materials for middle- and high-school students. A Teen Advisory Board plans Library activities and completes volunteer projects.

=== Reference and Information ===
Located on the second floor, research services for patrons include print resources and online databases, government documents, career and job search information, and community resources. The Business Reading Room and Business Reference collection includes journals, newspapers, and newsletters.

=== Children ===
Youth Services features materials for children up to middle school and at all stages of language development. The department includes a Family Place, where early readers can engage in a variety of activities to stimulate literacy; a teachers' collection; computers; games; a puppet theater; and study rooms. Events and programs for kids include storytimes, craft projects, and performances.

The Library offers a unique Dial-A-Story services that provides 24/7 access to recorded content. Patrons can call 847-232-8600 from any phone and use the menu to navigate to various recordings. Children will especially enjoy story time on Dial-A-Story as it requires no internet access to use.

=== Events ===
MPPL offers programs and activities for adults, teens and kids.

=== Circulation ===
Library cards are free to anyone who resides within the Village limits of Mount Prospect.

=== South Branch ===
The library partners with the Village of Mount Prospect, Northwest Community Hospital, and School Districts 214 and 59 to create the South Branch at Crystal Court Plaza at Busse and Algonquin roads. The South Branch offers books, movies, music, internet-connected computers with Microsoft office, homework and reading help, GED and ELL materials, information, preschool storytimes, teen programs and small business resources. Materials are available in a variety of languages, including English, Spanish, Polish, Russian, Gujarati, and Korean.
