= Mount Prospect School District 57 =

School district in Illinois, United States

Location
- Mount Prospect Cook County, Illinois, 60056; United States
- Coordinates: 42°04′24″N 87°56′47″W

District information
- Grades: K–8
- Superintendent: Dr. Mary Gorr

Other information
- Website: www.d57.org

Mount Prospect Public School District 57 is a community public school district that serves over 2,000 pre-kindergarten through eighth grade students in Mount Prospect, Illinois, United States, a suburb of Chicago covering an area of 4.3 square miles (11 km^{2}).

== History ==
In the early 1890s, William Busse, a township officer in what is now Mount Prospect, Illinois started a public school district for the town to attract residents to the area. Before then, students in the area attended five different schools in nearby Elk Grove, Maine, and Wheeling townships. Mount Prospect resident William Wille, a craftsman, donated a plot of and sold 3 plots of land for $200 to Busse. The one-roomed Central School, built by Wille, opened in the mid-1890s. 7 students ranging in age from 6 to 14 were enrolled during the first school year. As Mount Prospect lacked a central meeting place or village hall, Central School also served as Mount Prospect's primary social hall, community center, and eventual public library.

By 1917, enrollment at the Central School had increased to over 30. In 1927, a new four-roomed, $25,000 school building opened across the street from the one-room schoolhouse at the corner of Central Road and Route 83 (Main Street) to help alleviate overcrowding at the one-room schoolhouse. In 1937, a $30,000 addition of four more classrooms and a gymnasium were built onto the newer school building (also known as the Central Standard School), and the district sold the original one-room schoolhouse to nearby St. John's Episcopal Church for $500.

In the coming years, several additions were added to the Central School to help better serve a growing population. More rapid population growth after World War Two led the district to open Lincoln School at 700 West Lincoln Street in 1950. Fairview (1952), William Busse (1954), Lions Park (1956), Sunset Park (1958), Westbrook (1961), and Gregory (1963) Schools were also opened as new neighborhoods were built. Lincoln also received additions that doubled the size of the school in the late 1950s and early 1960s. 4,750 students were enrolled in the district in 1965.

As demographic changes started to occur in the late 1960s, district enrollment began to drop. In 1970, Central School closed due to declining enrollment and the deteriorating condition of the building. The building was demolished in 1975 to make way for a new public library. Thus, Lincoln became the only junior high school in the district. To accommodate the large number of new students, Lincoln Junior High School was greatly expanded. As enrollment continued to decline declined, Gregory Elementary School closed in 1975. The building was eventually sold and still standing, with additions, as a Christian college and church. Sunset Park School was closed by 1978, and the building was rented out for many uses until 1985 when the Mount Prospect Park District negotiated to buy it. The park district demolished the building shortly after the sale and it is now the site of a park. Amid public outcry, Busse School closed in 1982. The building was sold to the Park District and demolished in 1994.

In the mid-1990s, Fairview and Lions Park Elementary Schools were demolished and rebuilt. Westbrook Elementary School closed in 1996. The building was leased by the district to the NSSEO, a special education organization, for continued use as a school. By 2006, overcrowding was taking place in district elementary schools. The NSSEO did not renew their lease on Westbrook with the district that year, and Westbrook once again became a public elementary school for children in preschool and kindergarten. First grade classes at Lions Park and Fairview were transferred to Westbrook in 2009 to further alleviate overcrowding.

== Schools ==
The school district operates 2 elementary schools, 1 learning center, and 1 middle school.

School name	Lowest to Highest Grade	Number of Students	Principal	IRC Ranking
Lincoln Middle School	6th-8th grade	784	Mr. Paul Suminski	Commendable
Fairview Elementary School	2nd-5th grade	542	Mr. Dan Ophus	Commendable
Lions Park Elementary School	2nd-5th grade	446	Mrs. Katherine Kelly	Commendable
Westbrook Early Learning Center	Pre-kindergarten-1st grade	540	Ms. Kristin Vonder Haar	Commendable
