= Tom Nelson (American football player) =

American football player (born 1986)

No. 43, 49
- Position: Safety

Personal information
- Born: December 4, 1986 (age 39); Hoffman Estates, Illinois, U.S.
- Listed height: 5 ft 11 in (1.80 m)
- Listed weight: 200 lb (91 kg)

Career information
- High school: John Hersey (Arlington Heights, Illinois)
- College: Illinois State
- NFL draft: 2009: undrafted

Career history
- Cincinnati Bengals (2009−2010); Philadelphia Eagles (2011); Chicago Bears (2013)*; Carolina Panthers (2014)*; Baltimore Ravens (2015)*
- * Offseason or practice squad member only

Awards and highlights
- GFC All-Newcomer Team (2005); GFC Freshman of the Year (2005); 3× Second-team All-GFC (2006–2008)

Career NFL statistics
- Total tackles: 36
- Pass deflections: 2
- Interceptions: 1
- Stats at Pro Football Reference

Tom Nelson (born December 4, 1986) is an American former professional football player who was a safety in the National Football League (NFL). He was signed by the Cincinnati Bengals as an undrafted free agent in 2009. He was also a member of the Philadelphia Eagles, Chicago Bears, Carolina Panthers, and Baltimore Ravens. He played college football for the Illinois State Redbirds.

== Early life ==
Nelson grew up in Arlington Heights, Illinois and attended John Hersey High School, Thomas Middle School, and Ivy Hill Elementary School in Arlington Heights, IL. Nelson was a Chicago Bears fan during his youth.

== Professional career ==
Pre-draft measurables
| Height | Weight |
|---|---|
| 5 ft 11 1/8 in (1.81 m) | 196 lb (89 kg) |
Values from Pro Day

=== Cincinnati Bengals ===
After going undrafted in the 2009 NFL draft, Nelson was signed by the Cincinnati Bengals as an undrafted free agent on April 30, 2009. His attempt to make the Bengals' roster was chronicled on the HBO series Hard Knocks: Training Camp with the Cincinnati Bengals. In his rookie season he had 25 tackles and an interception. He was waived on August 27, 2011.

=== Philadelphia Eagles ===
The Philadelphia Eagles signed Nelson to a two-year contract on December 5, 2011, replacing Colt Anderson who had torn his ACL. He was released by the team on August 25, 2012.

=== Chicago Bears ===
The Chicago Bears signed Nelson to a one-year contract on January 29, 2013. On August 30, Nelson was among the final roster cuts.

=== Carolina Panthers ===
On July 27, 2014, Nelson was signed by the Carolina Panthers. On August 31, he was among the final roster cuts.

=== Baltimore Ravens ===
On July 29, 2015, Nelson was signed by the Baltimore Ravens. On an unknown date in August 2015 Nelson was signed to a 1-year contract as a Wide Receiver. On September 4, 2015, he was waived by the Ravens.

== Personal life ==
Nelson now owns a football camp and provides training for people of all ages.
