= Wheeling High School =

Location
- 900 S. Elmhurst Rd. Wheeling, Illinois 60090; United States; 42.1262°N 87.9392°W

Information
- School type: public secondary
- Opened: 1964
- School district: Twp. H.S. District 214
- Superintendent: Dr. Scott Rowe
- CEEB code: 144387
- Principal: Angela Hawkins
- Teaching staff: 115.8 (FTE)
- Grades: 9–12
- Gender: coed
- Enrollment: 1,623 (2024-25)
- Average class size: 22
- Student to teacher ratio: 16.2
- Campus: suburban
- Colors: royal blue athletic gold
- Athletics conference: Mid-Suburban League
- Mascot: Willie the Wildcat
- Nickname: Wildcats
- Publication: Circus
- Newspaper: Spokesman
- Yearbook: Lair
- TV station: WCAT
- Website: www.d214.org/o/whs

Wheeling High School (WHS) is a public four-year high school located in Wheeling, Illinois, United States, a northwest suburb of Chicago. It is part of Township High School District 214, which also includes Buffalo Grove High School, Elk Grove High School, John Hersey High School, Prospect High School, and Rolling Meadows High School. The school serves the communities of Wheeling, Prospect Heights, Arlington Heights, Buffalo Grove and Mount Prospect. In 2024, U.S. News & World Report ranked WHS as the 6th high school in District 214, the 124th high school in the Chicago metropolitan area, the 133rd high school in Illinois, and as the 3,664th high school in the United States.

== Feeder schools ==
Feeder schools include London Middle School, Holmes Middle School, and MacArthur Middle School. Some students from nearby private schools, such as St. Alphonsus Liguori, Saint Emily's Catholic School, St. Mary's School, and St. James, matriculate to WHS as well.

== History ==
Wheeling High School (WHS) first opened in 1964. The class of 1966 was the first graduating class from Wheeling High School. The current principal is Angela Hawkins. WHS's school colors are blue and gold, and the mascot is Willie the Wildcat. During the 2010–2011 school year, WHS was due to get their name changed to Wheeling High School Math, Science, Technology Academy and add the STEM (science, technology, engineering, and math) program to the school, but after several debates about the topic, the board of education and superintendent decided not to change the name of the school.

== Academics ==
As of 2024, Wheeling High School has a total enrollment of 1,623 students. The average class size is 22 students for every one teacher. WHS has an 86.1% graduation rate and a 1.1% dropout rate. About 80% of WHS graduates go on to attend a two- or four-year college. 78.3% of Wheeling High School teachers hold a degree at or above the master's degree level.

Wheeling High School offers over 200 different courses, many of which are at the AP or dual credit level. The academic departments at Wheeling High School are grouped as follows: AVID, career/technical education, English/fine arts, math/science, physical education/driver's education, special education, and world language/social science.

== Demographics ==
As of 2024, 63.8% of students identified as Hispanic, 24.5% as White, 7% as Asian, 2.7% as Black, and 1.9% as multiracial. 46.2% of students were classified as low-income.

== Athletics ==
Wheeling High School competes in the Mid-Suburban League (MSL) East Division. WHS is also a member of the Illinois High School Association (IHSA), which governs most of the interscholastic sports and competitive activities in Illinois. Wheeling High School teams are stylized as the Wildcats.

The school sponsors interscholastic sports teams in cheerleading, cross country, golf, poms, soccer, swimming & diving, tennis, volleyball, basketball, bowling, wrestling, lacrosse, track & field, and water polo. Young men may compete in football and baseball, while young women may compete in flag football, gymnastics, badminton and softball.

The girls' cross country teams won IHSA state championships in 1979–80, 1983–84, 1984–85, and 1986–87. The boys' cross country team won a state championship in 1998–99.

== Activities ==
Wheeling High School sponsors many clubs and activities for students, ranging from the arts and literature to cultural and community service. The list can change from year to year, but can be found at this site.

Among the activities are chapters or affiliates with the following national organizations: NJROTC, DECA, and the National Honor Society.

WildStang is a robotics team originally founded in 1996 as a joint effort between Motorola, Wheeling High School, and Rolling Meadows High School and is currently composed of students from all Township High School District 214 schools. The team won the 2006 Championship Chairman's Award at the FIRST Championship Event. WildStang has also won the FIRST Championship Event in 2003, 2009, and 2011. The WildStang FTC team, "MiniStang", has won the 2007, 2008, and 2009 Illinois State Championship with an undefeated record.

Wheeling High School's Congressional Debate team is also one of its most prominent clubs. As of 2011, the team had won 10 out of the previous 15 ICDA state titles; in that period, no other school had won more than once. The team was long coached by Mike Hurley, English teacher.

Another prominent club at Wheeling High School is its Orchesis team. The team has gone to the National High School Dance Festival 4 times in the last 8 years. Wheeling High School's Orchesis team has also gone to state several times in its history.

== Notable alumni ==
- Michael R. Blanchfield (1967), a U.S. Army Specialist 4; during a tour of duty in Vietnam, he was killed after throwing himself on an enemy grenade and received the Medal of Honor
- Chris Broach (1994), musician and producer known for Braid, The Firebird Band, & SNST.
- Jack Daulton (1974), art historian, art collector, and trial lawyer
- Shant Kenderian, Iraqi-born aerospace engineer and American prisoner-of-war after being forced to fight for Iraq in the Gulf War
- Mike Kinsella (1995), musician known for the bands Cap'n Jazz, American Football and his solo project Owen
- Tim Kinsella, musician, author, and film director known for bands Cap'n Jazz and Joan of Arc
- Charlie Kirk (2012), conservative political activist, author and media personality; assassinated in 2025
- Tommy McManus, former linebacker for NFL's Jacksonville Jaguars (1995–96, 1998–99)
- Mark Newman (1966), executive with baseball's New York Yankees
- Philip Ng (1994), Hong Kong-born American actor, martial artist and action choreographer
- Joseph G. Peterson (1983), novelist and poet
- Haley Reinhart (2009), singer, songwriter and voice actress, American Idol finalist
- Bren Spillane (2015), former baseball player for the Cincinnati Reds
- Kate Steinberg, internet personality, television personality, and NHL cheerleader
- Jorge Torres (1999), long-distance and cross-country runner who competed at the 2008 Summer Olympics
