= Arlington High School (Illinois) =

Location
- 502 West Euclid Ave. Arlington Heights, Illinois; United States; 42.0902°N 87.9894°W

Information
- School type: public secondary
- Established: 1922
- Status: Reopened as Christian Liberty Academy
- Closed: 1984
- School district: Township HS 214
- Grades: 9–12
- Gender: coed
- Campus type: suburban
- Colors: red white
- Fight song: Hail to Ol' Arlington
- Team name: Cardinals
- Newspaper: The Cardinal
- Yearbook: Heights

Arlington High School was a public high school located in Arlington Heights, Illinois, which operated from 1922 to 1984. It was the oldest school in Township High School District 214 which served students in Arlington Heights, Buffalo Grove, Elk Grove Village, Mount Prospect, Prospect Heights, Rolling Meadows and Wheeling, Illinois. The school occupied a site that is approximately 1.3 km due east of Arlington Racetrack.

In the mid-1980s, District 214 had budget concerns with declining enrollment. As a result, the district board members decided to close Arlington High School in 1984, and Forest View High School in 1986.

== History ==
The closing of Arlington High School was a significant community event in 1983 and 1984, which embattled residents of the district who did not want to see their high schools close. The school district administration completed its first report in April 1981 to the District 214 Board of Education stating that one of eight high schools should close by 1983 due to declining enrollment. Weeks later a report was submitted that two high schools should close by the 1985-1986 school year. Residents responded by presenting arguments to support their own schools. Pro-Arlington supporters declared that Arlington, being the oldest school, had an important community tradition and an important location near downtown Arlington Heights that helped develop and maintain community values and support downtown businesses. Arlington supporters also declared that Arlington had dense residential surroundings, which allowed most students to walk to school. Arlington supporters also underscored the benefit of the agreement with the Arlington Heights Park District to use the swimming pool, which was across the street from the high school, for education and competitive swimming events. Only Wheeling and Buffalo Grove High Schools, which were not at risk of closure, had swimming pools.

In April 1982 a computer study listed Rolling Meadows, John Hersey High School, Forest View and Prospect High School (in order) as the most likely schools to be closed. Non-Arlington High School residents sought to keep their schools open by declaring that Arlington High School was the oldest school and the most expensive to maintain and remodel. They even cited a tragic accident in 1971, when a brick partition wall in a bathroom collapsed when three male students (trapped in the bathroom) braced themselves to open a door that had been secured by a piece of wood as a prank. One of the students eventually died from his injuries. The partitions were immediately re-designed for safety reasons.

On May 3, 1982, District 214 adjusted data for a computer study and corrected the target list for school closures: John Hersey High School, Arlington, and Prospect High School. On May 17, 1982, the District 214 board voted 5–2 to close Arlington High School. A group of Arlington High School parents formed the Assembly of Citizens and Taxpayers (ACT) to study the possibility of seceding from District 214 and forming their own district (August, 1982). Eventually a lawsuit was filed by five Arlington Heights residents and ACT against District 214, charging the board ignored facts from its own studies (November 18, 1982).

In the subsequent lawsuit, District 214 planner Howard Feddema testified that board member Donald Hoeck called him to ask that a computer study's data be manipulated to have Arlington High School move to the top as the candidate for closing. Hoeck replied that he was only trying to demonstrate that numbers could be manipulated many ways (March 10 and 11, 1983). Circuit Court Judge James C. Murray overturned the District 214 decision to close Arlington High School. Judge Murray's opinion states that the board created standards to follow in the closing of schools and then failed to follow them (May 26, 1983). District 214 appealed on June 1, 1983, but Arlington High School freshmen still enrolled in Fall 1983.

On the second day of the new school year in 1983, Illinois Appellate Court (Justices James J. Mejda, Kenneth E. Wilson, and Francis S. Lorenz) overturned Cook County Judge James Murray's ruling blocking the closing of Arlington High School. The Appellate Court stated that they "cannot question the wisdom of the final action. Right or wrong, it is the decision the board adopted as a quasi-legislative function within its powers ..." and that the court is "unable to say that the ultimate decision itself, the decision to close Arlington and reassign the freshmen students was so palpably arbitrary, capricious or unreasonable as to render it null and void" (August 31, 1983).

== Post closure uses ==
In May 1984, District 214 put Arlington High School up for sale and then for auction. Arlington High School closed its doors to public high school students in June 1984. The following year in April, Christian Liberty Academy of Prospect Heights purchased Arlington High School for $1.51 million. Christian Liberty Academy continues to operate from the Arlington High School building.

Interior and exterior scenes from the 1986 film Lucas starring Charlie Sheen and Corey Haim were shot at the school during the summer immediately after its closing, including some scenes with the Prospect High School Marching Band which at that point contained former Arlington students.

== Notable alumni ==
- Doug Betters was an NFL All-Pro defensive end.
- Dick Bokelmann, former MLB player (St. Louis Cardinals)
- George Bork is a former football quarterback who played for Northern Illinois University before playing for the Montreal Alouettes of the Canadian Football League. The first college quarterback to pass for 3,000 yards, he was inducted into the College Football Hall of Fame.
- Charles Dickinson (1969), Author
- Alan Gratzer (1966) is a co-founder of REO Speedwagon.
- Robert A. "Bob" McDonald (1971), U.S. Secretary of Veterans Affairs; Chairman, President, and CEO of Procter & Gamble.
- Ed Paschke (1957) was a highly acclaimed artist, a leader in the Chicago Imagist style.
- Fritz Peterson was a pitcher for the New York Yankees who pitched in the 1970 All-Star Game.
- Paul Splittorff was a star pitcher with the Kansas City Royals. Coincidentally, Splittorff pitched against fellow Arlington grad Fritz Peterson at Yankee Stadium in 1971
- George Vukovich, former MLB player (Philadelphia Phillies, Cleveland Indians)
- Scott Waara (1957), Best Featured Actor Tony Award for his performance of Herman in The Most Happy Fella in 1992.
