= River Trails School District 26 =

School district in Mount Prospect, Illinois, USA

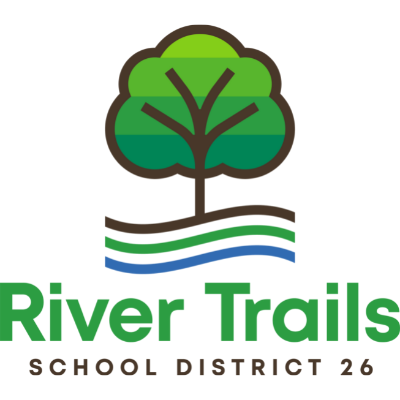

Address
- 1900 East Kensington Road Mount Prospect, Cook County, Illinois, 60056; United States

District information
- Grades: PreK–8
- Superintendent: Dr. Jodi Megerle
- NCES District ID: 1733870

Students and staff
- Students: 1,500+
- Staff: 250+

Other information
- Website: www.rtsd26.org

River Trails School District 26 is a school district headquartered in Mount Prospect, Illinois, in the Chicago metropolitan area. The school district serves more than 1,500 students in four schools.

== Schools ==
River Trails School District 26 operates one middle school, two elementary schools and one early learning center.

School name	Grades	Number of Students	Principal
River Trails Middle School	6th through 8th	500+	Mary Krall-Meske
Euclid Elementary School	1st through 5th	360+	Karen Daly
Indian Grove Elementary School	1st through 5th	450+	Bill Timmins
Prairie Trails School	Pre-K and Kindergarten	170+	Amy Veytsman

== Board of education ==
- William Grimpe, President
- Janine Freedlund, Vice President
- Donna Johnson, Secretary
- Louis Camardo
- Kimberly Bianchini
- Becky Pfisterer
- Robert Rognstad

== Administration ==
- Superintendent: Dr. Jodi Megerle
- Assistant Superintendent for Business Services: Ryan Berry
- Assistant Superintendent for Special Services: Dr. Carie Cohen
- Assistant Superintendent for Teaching and Learning: Kristine Seifert
- Director of Innovation and Technology: Alicia Duell
- Director of Building and Grounds: Dan Whisler
