= Buffalo Grove High School =

Location
- 1100 W. Dundee Rd. Buffalo Grove, Illinois 60089; United States; 42.1405°N 87.9829°W

Information
- School type: Public secondary
- Opened: 1973
- School district: Twp. H.S. District 214
- Superintendent: Scott Rowe
- Principal: Jeff Wardle
- Teaching staff: 119.64 (FTE)
- Grades: 9–12
- Gender: coed
- Enrollment: 2,021 (2024-2025)
- Student to teacher ratio: 16.89
- Campus: Suburban
- Colors: navy blue burnt orange white
- Athletics conference: Mid-Suburban League
- Mascot: Bison
- Newspaper: The Charger
- Yearbook: Stampede
- Website: www.d214.org/o/bghs

Buffalo Grove High School (BGHS) is a public high school located in Buffalo Grove, Illinois, a northwestern suburb of Chicago. It is one of six four-year comprehensive high schools in Township High School District 214, serving portions of the villages of Buffalo Grove, Arlington Heights, and Wheeling. Feeder schools are Cooper Middle School, Thomas Middle School, and London Middle School.

== History ==
Buffalo Grove High School opened in 1973, drawing students and staff from Wheeling and John Hersey High Schools. Dr. Clarence M. "Chick" Miller, formerly assistant principal at Wheeling High School, was named the school's first principal.

On March 12, 1976, President Gerald Ford, during his campaign against former California Governor Ronald Reagan, made a March primary appearance in the gymnasium of Buffalo Grove High School.

In 2003, new classrooms, a foyer, and offices opened as part of a six-million dollar renovation. The "Circle Drive" on the west side of the school was greatly reduced in size to make room for the new classrooms and foyer. The new classrooms included new science labs and special-ed facilities. Additionally, room was made in old storage space on the second floor of the south side of the building for new foreign-language classrooms.

On August 27, 2004, the Bison hosted their first Friday night game under new lights at Bison Stadium. They were the final team in the Mid-Suburban League to switch from Saturday afternoons to Friday night games.

== Academics ==
Buffalo Grove High School won a 1999–2000 Blue Ribbon Award for Excellence, presented by the United States Department of Education.

In 2008, the average ACT score was 23.3, and 95.5% of the class of 2008 graduated on time. BGHS failed to meet Adequate Yearly Progress (AYP) according to the federal No Child Left Behind Act because of scores below the minimum target on the Prairie State Achievement Examination and ACT in two student subgroups.

== Athletics ==
A renovation of the school in 2014 added a multimillion-dollar pool area. Teams from Buffalo Grove HS compete in the Mid-Suburban League (MSL). Buffalo Grove is also a member of the Illinois High School Association (IHSA), the governing body for most interscholastic sports and competitive activities in Illinois.

The school sponsors interscholastic teams for boys and girls in basketball, cross country, golf, lacrosse, gymnastics, soccer, swimming & diving, tennis, track & field, volleyball, and water polo. Boys may compete in baseball, football, and wrestling. Girls may compete in badminton, bowling, and softball. In 2011 the school inducted a co-ed competitive cheerleading team to perform at athletic games and compete in the winter and spring.

=== State championships ===
- Basketball (Girls): 1999–00
- Bass fishing: 2016–17
- Football: 1986–87
- Soccer (Boys): 1988–89
- Competitive Co-Ed Cheerleading: 2012–13, 2014–15, 2015–16, 2022–23

== Activities ==
Buffalo Grove supports 47 student clubs and activities, an entire and updated list of which can be found at the school's website. These include music, the arts, culture and language, social/political action, and student government. Buffalo Grove also has a nationally recognized Speech and Debate team, boasting the 99th best Lincoln Douglas Debate team in the National Forensics League.

Among the clubs are chapters of these more nationally notable groups: NJROTC, SADD, Scholastic Bowl, Science Olympiad (which won the Illinois State Championship in 1989, 1990 and 2024), and Mathletes.

In March 2012, the Scholastic Bowl Team qualified for the IHSA State Meet in Peoria, Illinois by beating William Fremd High School in the Sectional Final at North Chicago High School. They were also the Regional Champions and MSL Conference Champions, beating Fremd in dramatic fashion 485-480.

Another prominent group at Buffalo Grove was its show choir, The Expressions. This mixed competition show choir was composed of 38 singer-dancers, 12 band members and four crew members. Similar to the hit television show Glee, the group met as a class and competed throughout the country at various show choir competitions. They attended the Dekalb Indiana Show Choir Invitational Competition, the Chicagoland Showcase Competition, and the Nashville Show Choir Nationals Competition.

== Notable alumni ==
- Tim Bogar — Major League Baseball infielder (1993–2001), primarily for New York Mets and Houston Astros, First Base Coach of Washington Nationals, former interim manager of Texas Rangers
- Melanie Chandra — actress, Code Black
- Larry Doyle — comic writer who worked on The Simpsons (1997–2001); first novel, Thurber Prize-winning I Love You, Beth Cooper, is set at Buffalo Grove High School.
- Lindsey Durlacher — Greco-Roman wrestler who competed for U.S.
- Doug Ghim PGA professional golfer.
- Felice Herrig (2003) — professional Mixed Martial Artist, current UFC Strawweight
- Brett Lebda — professional ice hockey defenseman, member of 2008 Stanley Cup champion Detroit Red Wings
- Mike Marshall — Major League Baseball outfielder and first baseman (1981–91), primarily with Los Angeles Dodgers; member of 1988 World Series champions
- Brian McBride — professional soccer player, first overall selection in inaugural MLS draft in 1996; has since played in three FIFA World Cups for the US men's national soccer team
- Anthony Palano — college football linebacker for the Boston College Eagles
- Josh Paul — Major League Baseball catcher (1999–2007), primarily with Chicago White Sox
- Jessy Schram — actress; among notable roles are Hannah Griffith in Veronica Mars, Rachel Seybolt in Life, Karen in Falling Skies and Cinderella/Ashley Boyd in Once Upon a Time
- Judd Sirott — radio broadcaster, nationally for NHL, locally with Chicago Wolves, Chicago Blackhawks, and WGN (AM) with Chicago Cubs
- Don Thorp — defensive lineman in NFL (1984, 1987–88)
- Tom Zbikowski — special teams for NFL's Baltimore Ravens, Indianapolis Colts and Chicago Bears, as well as professional boxer
