= Schaumburg, Illinois =

- Village
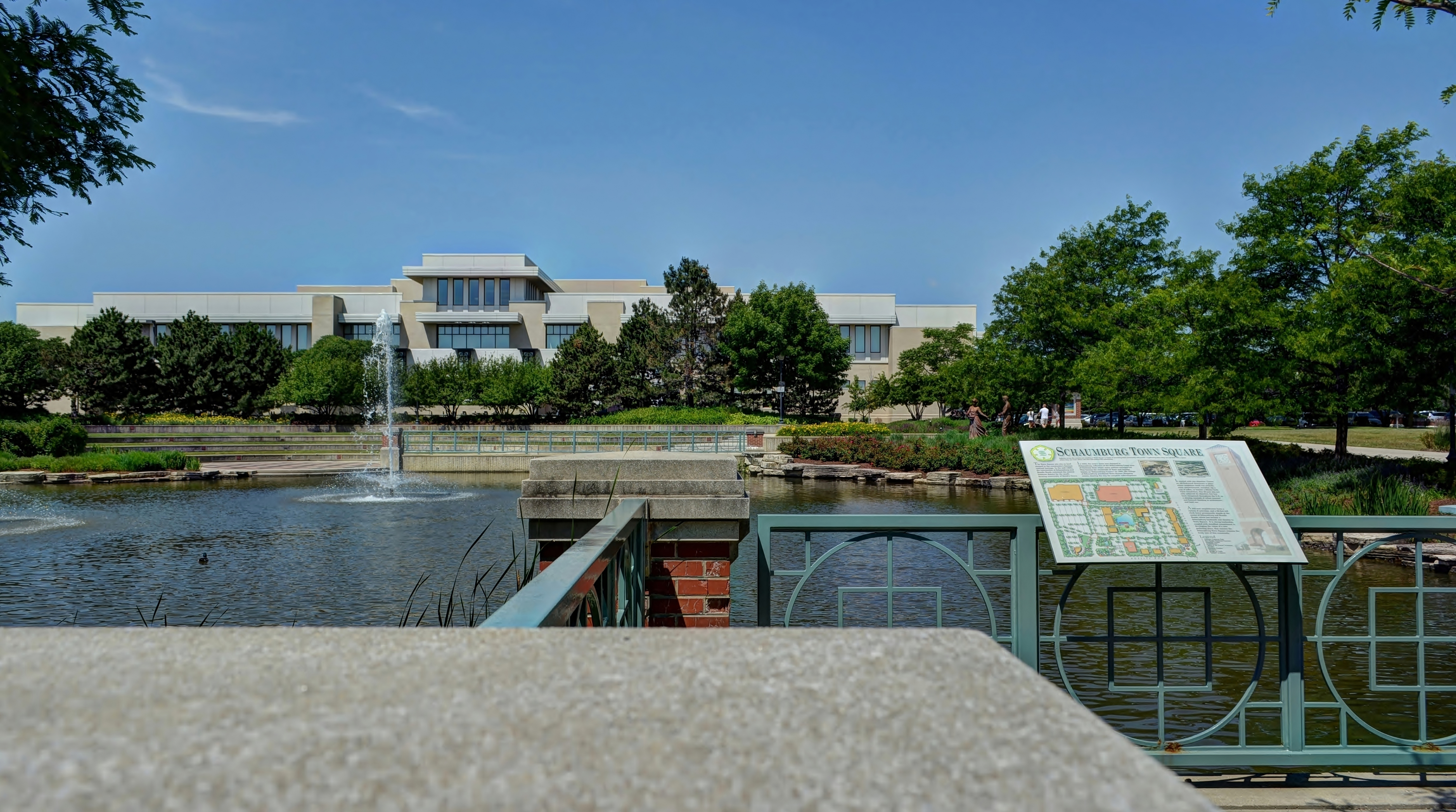
- Schaumburg Town Square

- Seal
- Motto: "Progress Through Thoughtful Planning"
- Interactive map of Schaumburg, Illinois
- Location within Greater Chicago Location within Illinois Location within the United States
- Coordinates: 42°01′49″N 88°05′02″W
- Country: United States
- State: Illinois
- Counties: Cook and DuPage
- Townships: Schaumburg, Palatine, Hanover
- Incorporated: March 7, 1956
- Named for: Schaumburg-Lippe

Government
  - Type: Council–manager
  - Mayor: Tom Dailly

Area
  - Total: 19.47 sq mi (50.42 km^{2})
  - Land: 19.35 sq mi (50.11 km^{2})
  - Water: 0.12 sq mi (0.31 km^{2}) 22%
  - Rank: 9
- Elevation: 794 ft (242 m)

Population (2020)
  - Total: 78,723
  - Estimate (2024): 77,099 ▼
  - Density: 4,069.2/sq mi (1,571.12/km^{2})
- Demonym: Schaums
- Time zone: UTC−6 (CST)
  - Summer (DST): UTC−5 (CDT)
- ZIP Code(s): 60159, 60168, 60173, 60179, 60193-60196
- Area codes: 847/224 and 630/331
- FIPS code: 17-68003
- Wikimedia Commons: Schaumburg, Illinois
- Website: www.villageofschaumburg.com

Schaumburg (/ˈʃɔːmbɜːrɡ/ SHAWM-burg) is a village in Cook and DuPage counties in the U.S. state of Illinois. At the 2020 census, the population was 78,723, making Schaumburg the most populous incorporated village in the United States. Schaumburg is around 26 miles (42 km) northwest of downtown Chicago and 10 miles (16 km) northwest of O'Hare International Airport.

Schaumburg's transition from a rural community to a suburban city began with Alfred Campanelli's first large-scale suburban-style development in 1959 and Woodfield Mall's opening in 1971. Schaumburg is bordered by Hoffman Estates and Palatine to the north, Inverness in northwest, Streamwood to the west, Hanover Park to the southwest, Roselle to the south, Elk Grove Village to the southeast, and Rolling Meadows to the northeast.

== History ==
=== 19th century ===
Prior to European settlement, the region was inhabited by the Sauk, Meskwaki, Potawatomi, and Kickapoo peoples. During the mid-19th century, settlers began arriving from Germany and the eastern United States. Many of the Germans came from Hessian Schaumburg and Schaumburg-Lippe, a region within the modern state of Lower Saxony.

Among the earliest settlers were Trumball Kent and Johann Sunderlage, who established farms in what became Schaumburg Township. The men were "yankee" settlers from New York and New England. According to one legend, Sunderlage was a member of a survey team that divided Cook County into townships around 1833; according to another legend, he worked on a survey team on the Joliet canal. He liked the area so much that, upon completion of the project, he returned to Europe and brought his family and friends from Germany and settled in the area now known as Hoffman Estates around 1836. His home still stands in its original location.

The original 1842 township survey names the grove (immediately west of the center of the township, in sections 21 and 22) as Sarah's Grove. Three families lived near a grove of woods on the northwest end of the township. At a township meeting in 1850, citizens debated new names for the town. A wealthy landowner named Friedrich Heinrich Nerge, at one point during the meeting, slammed his fist on the table and yelled in Low German, "Schaumburg schall et heiten!" (transl. "It will be called Schaumburg!"). At that point, the township became officially called Schaumburg.

The township's population became increasingly German throughout the 19th century. In 1840, a majority of households originated from the eastern United States, but by the 1850s German immigrants formed the largest group, and by 1870 most land in the township was owned by German immigrants or their descendants. The township took its name in 1850 from Schaumburg County in Germany, reflecting the origins of many of its settlers.

Agriculture dominated the local economy during the township's early years. Farmers raised livestock and produced dairy products and crops, while a small commercial center developed at the intersection of present-day Schaumburg and Roselle Roads. The area remained relatively isolated because it was not located along major rail lines or transportation routes, requiring farmers to travel long distances to reach markets in Chicago.

German culture remained a defining feature of the community well into the 20th century. German was widely spoken in local households until the 1950s, and many institutions reflected the area's immigrant heritage. St. Peter Lutheran Church, founded in the 1840s, continued to hold services in German into the late 20th century and remains an important historical landmark.

Schaumburg Township remained largely agricultural and under German ownership until the Great Depression, when some farms changed hands through foreclosure. Despite these changes, the area's German heritage continued to shape the community's identity in the decades preceding the incorporation of the village in 1956.

=== 20th century to present ===
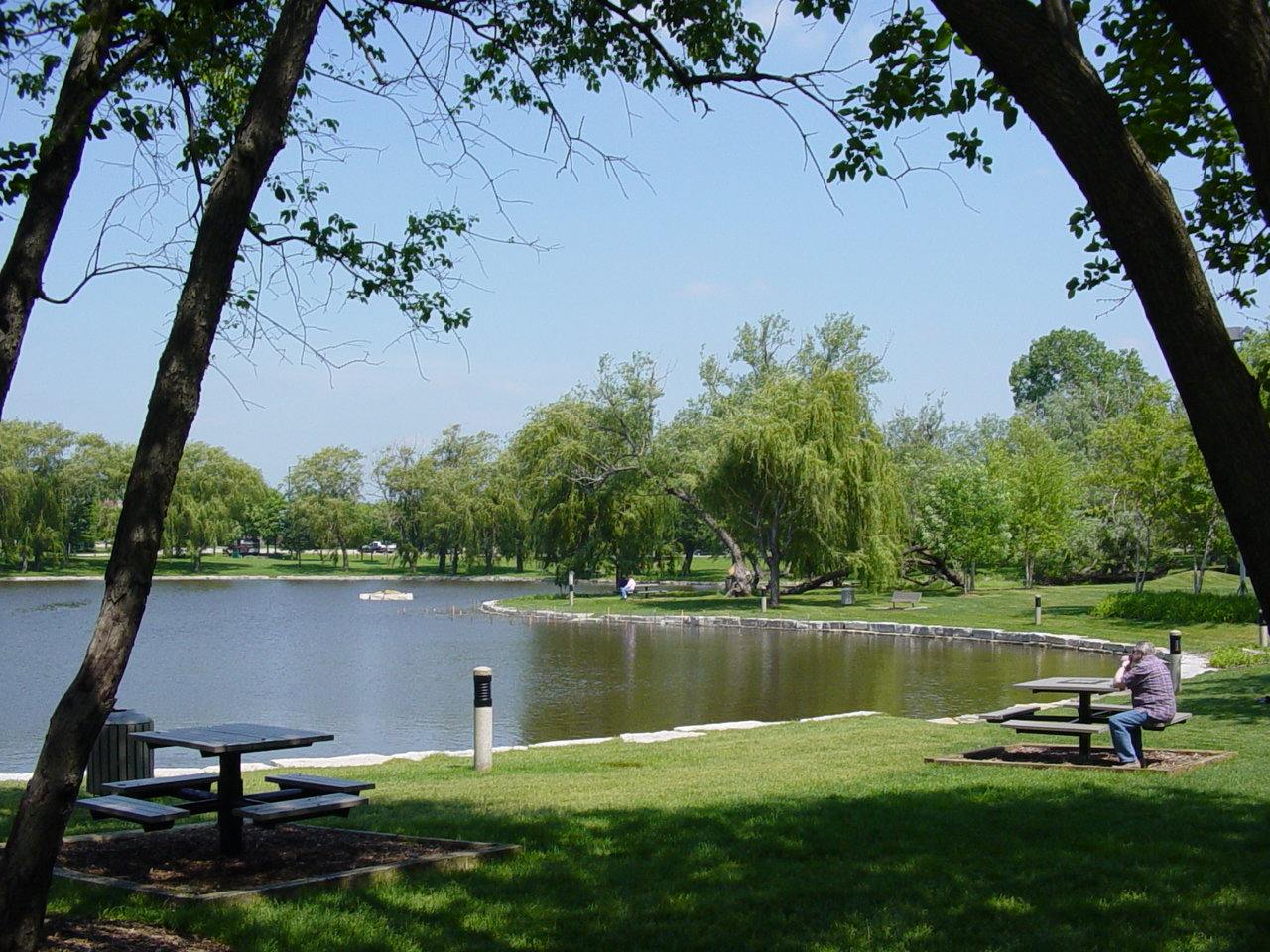
Lakeside at the Schaumburg Prairie Center for the Arts

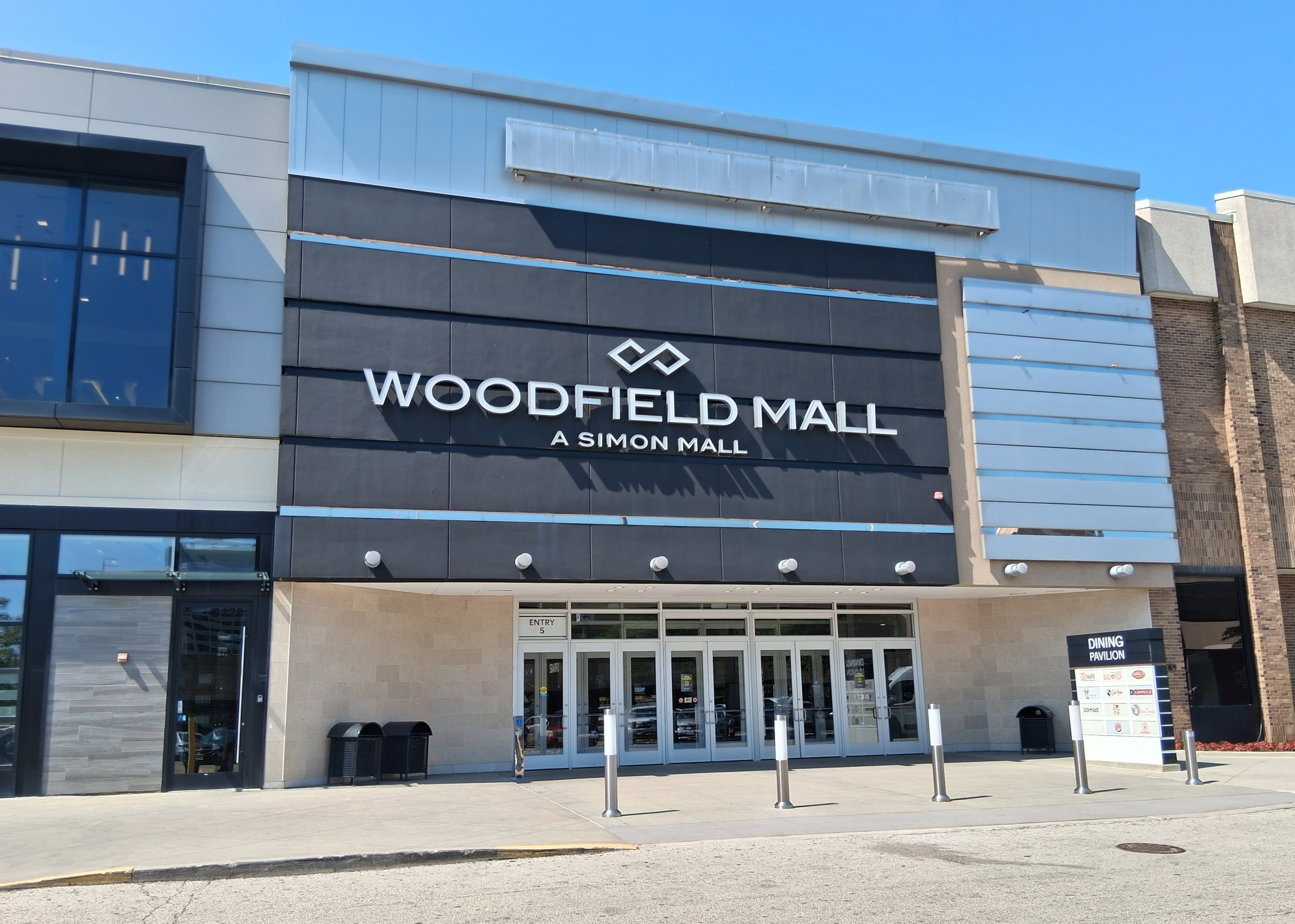
Woodfield Mall

In 1900, a 50-year anniversary brochure described Schaumburg as having "the reputation of being the model community of Cook County. Also, the town of Schaumburg is an example of a community for all other towns in Cook County and probably in other counties, too. Schaumburg is prompt in the payment of its taxes; it supports churches and schools; it has also the best roads in the land and – Schaumburg has never had a jail. Finally, it is not just for the settlers only, but also for foreigners."

In 1925, O. D. Jennings purchased a home in Schaumburg. Following the death of his widow, the house and surrounding land were donated to the village and served as Village Hall until 1971.

Schaumburg's development accelerated during the mid-20th century. The construction of O'Hare International Airport in 1955 and the Northwest Tollway in 1956 improved access to the area. Pure Oil's presence in the area also brought growth, and in response, the village incorporated in 1956 with a population of approximately 130 residents.

During the 1960s, residential and commercial development expanded significantly. Alfred Campanelli began construction of the Weathersfield subdivision in 1959, eventually building more than 6,800 housing units. In 1967, International Village, Schaumburg's first major multifamily residential development, was completed, and Motorola began constructing its corporate headquarters nearby.

By 1970, Schaumburg's population had grown to 18,730. Interstate 290 opened along the village's eastern boundary, and Woodfield Mall opened in 1971. In 1978, the village established the Olde Schaumburg Centre Overlay District and the Olde Schaumburg Centre Commission to help preserve the historic character of the area around Schaumburg and Roselle Roads.

By 1980, Schaumburg encompassed 18.3 square miles (47.4 km^{2}) and had a population of 53,305. During the 1980s, office, industrial, retail, and hotel development expanded substantially. Population growth slowed during the 1990s as land available for residential development diminished. The population reached 68,586 by 1990. During the decade, commercial development continued, including expansions at Woodfield Mall and the opening of an IKEA store.

In 1994, the village acquired and renovated Schaumburg Regional Airport. The following year, it purchased the Town Square shopping center and began its redevelopment.

Professional baseball arrived in Schaumburg in 1999 with the construction of Alexian Field, home of the Schaumburg Flyers. The stadium later became home to the Schaumburg Boomers and was renamed Wintrust Field in 2021.

In 2000, the village purchased 45 acres (180,000 m^{2}) next to a short, independent stretch of Meacham Road. This was developed into the Renaissance Schaumburg Hotel & Convention Center.

== Geography ==
According to the 2021 census gazetteer files, Schaumburg has a total area of 19.47 square miles (50.43 km^{2}), of which 19.35 square miles (50.12 km^{2}) (or 99.39%) is land and 0.12 square miles (0.31 km^{2}) (or 0.61%) is water. Its elevation varies between 750 and 850 feet above sea level, with a high point of 850 feet at the intersection of Schaumburg Road and Webster Lane. Schaumburg serves as the headwaters of the West Branch Dupage River, which drains the central and western portions of the village, flowing to the southwest. The West Branch of the Salt Creek drains the eastern portion of the village, flowing eastward into Busse Lake.

=== Climate ===
Schaumburg is in the Hot-summer humid continental climate, or Köppen Dfa zone. The zone includes four distinct seasons. Winter is cold with snow. Spring warms up with precipitation and storms. Summer has high precipitation and storms. Fall cools down.

Climate data for Schaumburg, IL Climate normals based on Schaumburg(rain)/O'Hare(temps) (1990-2020)
Month	Jan	Feb	Mar	Apr	May	Jun	Jul	Aug	Sep	Oct	Nov	Dec	Year
Mean daily maximum °F (°C)	31.6 (−0.2)	35.7 (2.1)	47.0 (8.3)	59.0 (15.0)	70.5 (21.4)	80.4 (26.9)	84.5 (29.2)	82.5 (28.1)	75.5 (24.2)	62.7 (17.1)	48.4 (9.1)	36.6 (2.6)	59.5 (15.3)
Daily mean °F (°C)	25.2 (−3.8)	28.8 (−1.8)	39.0 (3.9)	49.7 (9.8)	60.6 (15.9)	70.6 (21.4)	75.4 (24.1)	73.8 (23.2)	66.3 (19.1)	54.0 (12.2)	41.3 (5.2)	30.5 (−0.8)	51.3 (10.7)
Mean daily minimum °F (°C)	18.8 (−7.3)	21.8 (−5.7)	31.0 (−0.6)	40.3 (4.6)	50.6 (10.3)	60.8 (16.0)	66.4 (19.1)	65.1 (18.4)	57.1 (13.9)	45.4 (7.4)	34.1 (1.2)	24.4 (−4.2)	43.0 (6.1)
Average precipitation inches (mm)	1.98 (50)	1.96 (50)	2.48 (63)	3.84 (98)	4.76 (121)	4.52 (115)	3.92 (100)	4.30 (109)	3.38 (86)	3.47 (88)	2.74 (70)	2.25 (57)	39.6 (1,007)
Average snowfall inches (cm)	11.3 (29)	10.7 (27)	5.5 (14)	1.3 (3.3)	0 (0)	0 (0)	0 (0)	0.0 (0.0)	0 (0)	0.2 (0.51)	1.8 (4.6)	7.6 (19)	38.4 (97.41)
Source: NWS/NOAA

== Demographics ==
Historical population
Census	Pop.	Note	%±
1960	986		—
1970	18,724		1,799.0%
1980	53,305		184.7%
1990	68,586		28.7%
2000	75,386		9.9%
2010	74,227		−1.5%
2020	78,723		6.1%
U.S. Decennial Census; 2010 2020

=== Racial and ethnic composition ===
Schaumburg village, Illinois – Racial and ethnic composition Note: the US Census treats Hispanic/Latino as an ethnic category. This table excludes Latinos from the racial categories and assigns them to a separate category. Hispanics/Latinos may be of any race.
Race / Ethnicity (NH = Non-Hispanic)	Pop 2000	Pop 2010	Pop 2020	% 2000	% 2010	% 2020
White alone (NH)	56,953	48,385	43,739	75.55%	65.19%	55.56%
Black or African American alone (NH)	2,479	2,987	3,266	3.29%	4.02%	4.15%
Native American or Alaska Native alone (NH)	66	112	105	0.09%	0.15%	0.13%
Asian alone (NH)	10,661	14,675	20,767	14.14%	19.77%	26.38%
Pacific Islander alone (NH)	42	18	11	0.06%	0.02%	0.01%
Other race alone (NH)	97	96	268	0.13%	0.13%	0.34%
Mixed race or Multiracial (NH)	1,100	1,400	2,304	1.46%	1.89%	2.93%
Hispanic or Latino (any race)	3,988	6,554	8,263	5.29%	8.83%	10.50%
Total	75,386	74,227	78,723	100.00%	100.00%	100.00%

=== 2020 census ===
As of the 2020 census, Schaumburg had a population of 78,723. The median age was 39.3 years. 21.2% of residents were under the age of 18 and 16.4% of residents were 65 years of age or older. For every 100 females there were 94.2 males, and for every 100 females age 18 and over there were 91.5 males age 18 and over.

100.0% of residents lived in urban areas, while 0.0% lived in rural areas.

There were 31,944 households in Schaumburg, of which 30.9% had children under the age of 18 living in them. Of all households, 50.2% were married-couple households, 18.4% were households with a male householder and no spouse or partner present, and 26.1% were households with a female householder and no spouse or partner present. About 30.0% of all households were made up of individuals and 10.2% had someone living alone who was 65 years of age or older.

There were 33,459 housing units, of which 4.5% were vacant. The homeowner vacancy rate was 1.0% and the rental vacancy rate was 6.8%.

The median income for a household in the village was $82,387, and the median income for a family was $98,640. Males had a median income of $63,479 versus $43,286 for females. The per capita income for the village was $42,303. About 4.4% of families and 5.7% of the population were below the poverty line, including 6.8% of those under age 18 and 5.6% of those age 65 or over.

== Economy ==
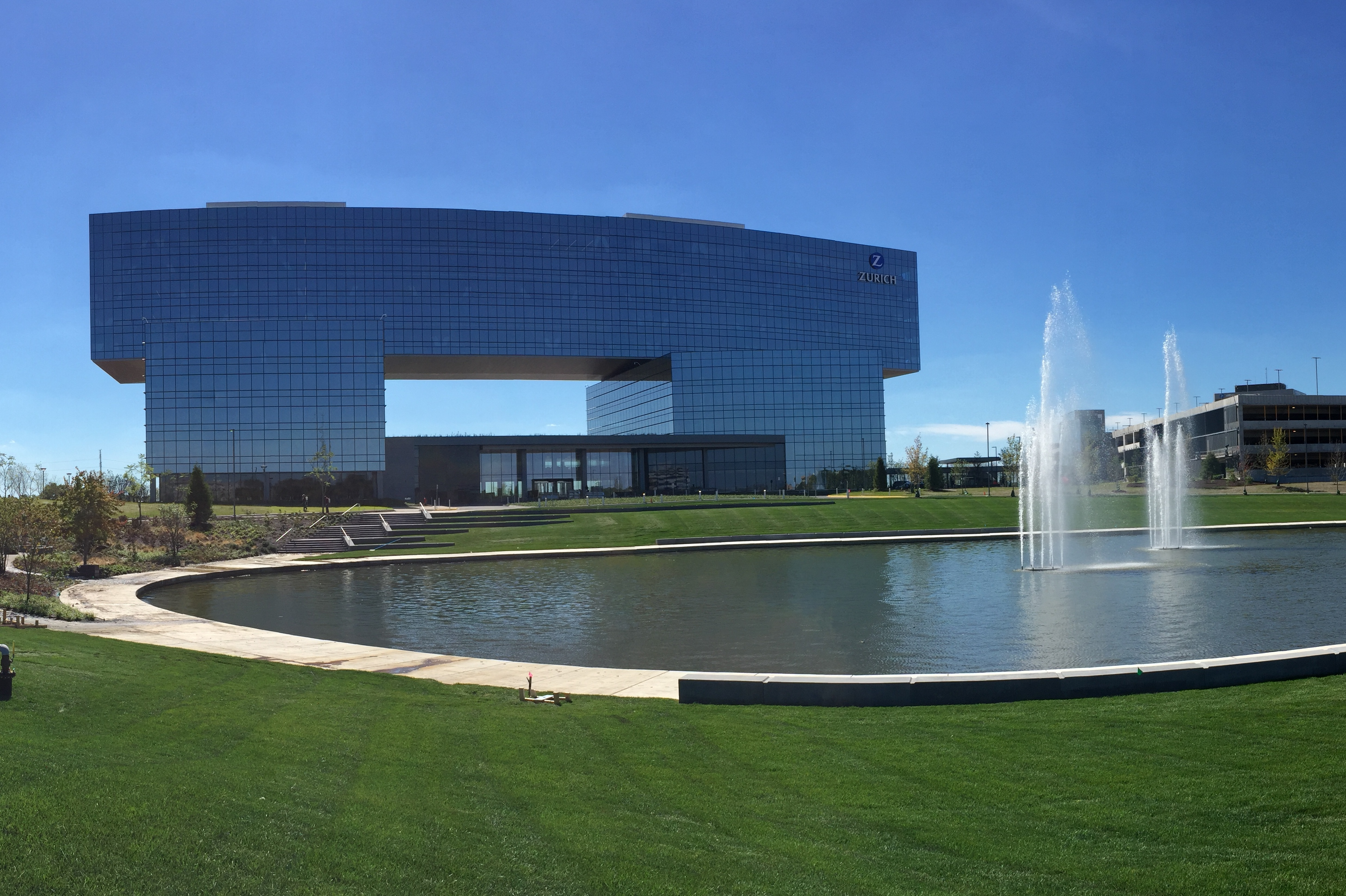
Zurich North America headquarters

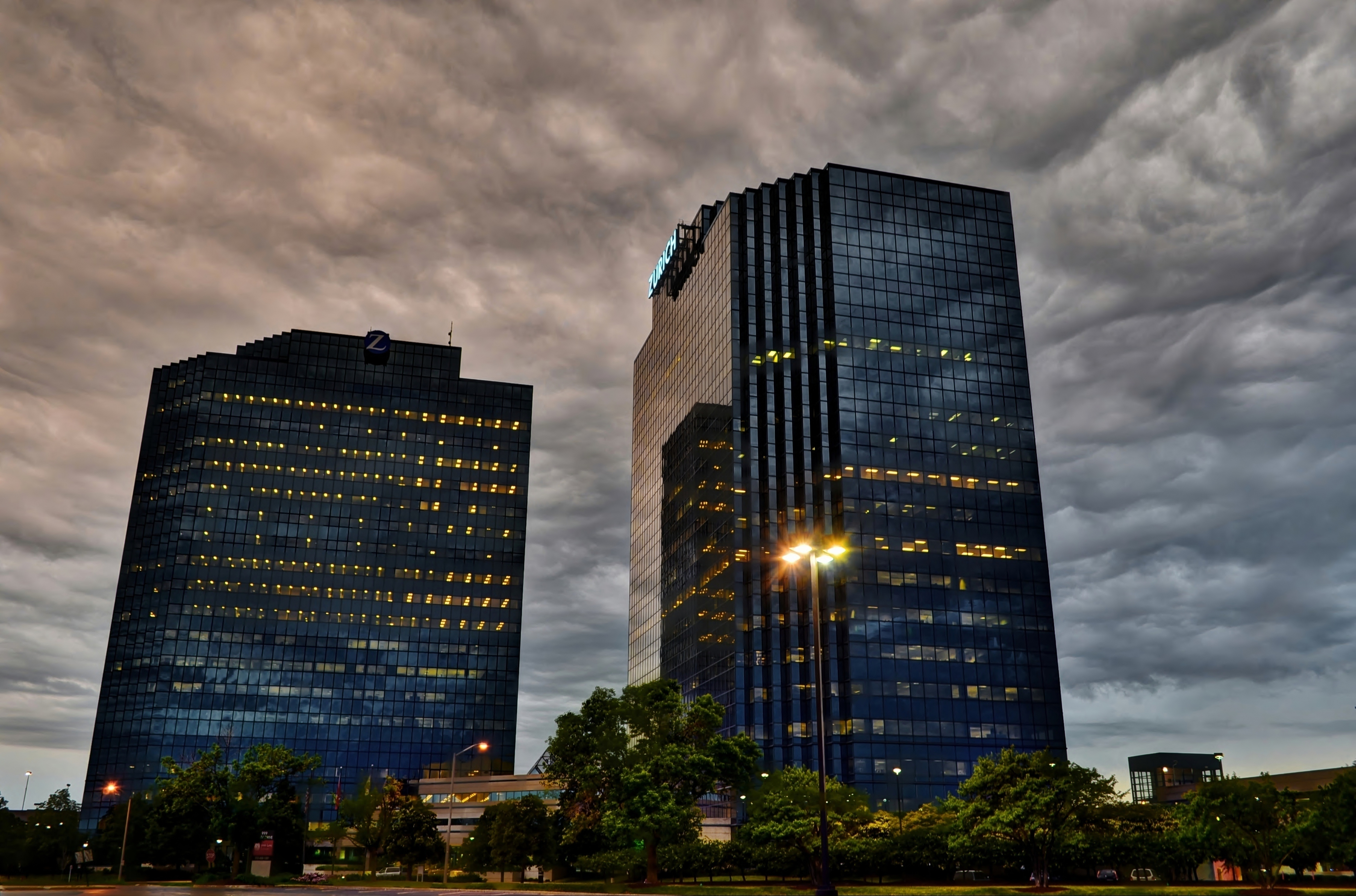
Schaumburg Towers

Companies headquartered in Schaumburg include Zurich North America and Perdoceo Education Corporation (formerly Career Education Corporation). As of 2011, many Japanese companies have their U.S. headquarters in Schaumburg and Hoffman Estates.

=== Top employers ===
According to the Village's website, the top employers in the village are:

#	Employer	# of Employees
1	Woodfield Mall	4,400
2	Zurich North America	2,600
3	Community Consolidated School District 54	2,030
4	Motorola Solutions	1,600
5	OptumRx (Catamaran)	1,300
6	IBM	900
7	Genworth Financial	850
8	Paylocity	800
9	Nation Pizza and Foods	700
10	Encore Village	650

== Education ==
=== Primary and secondary ===
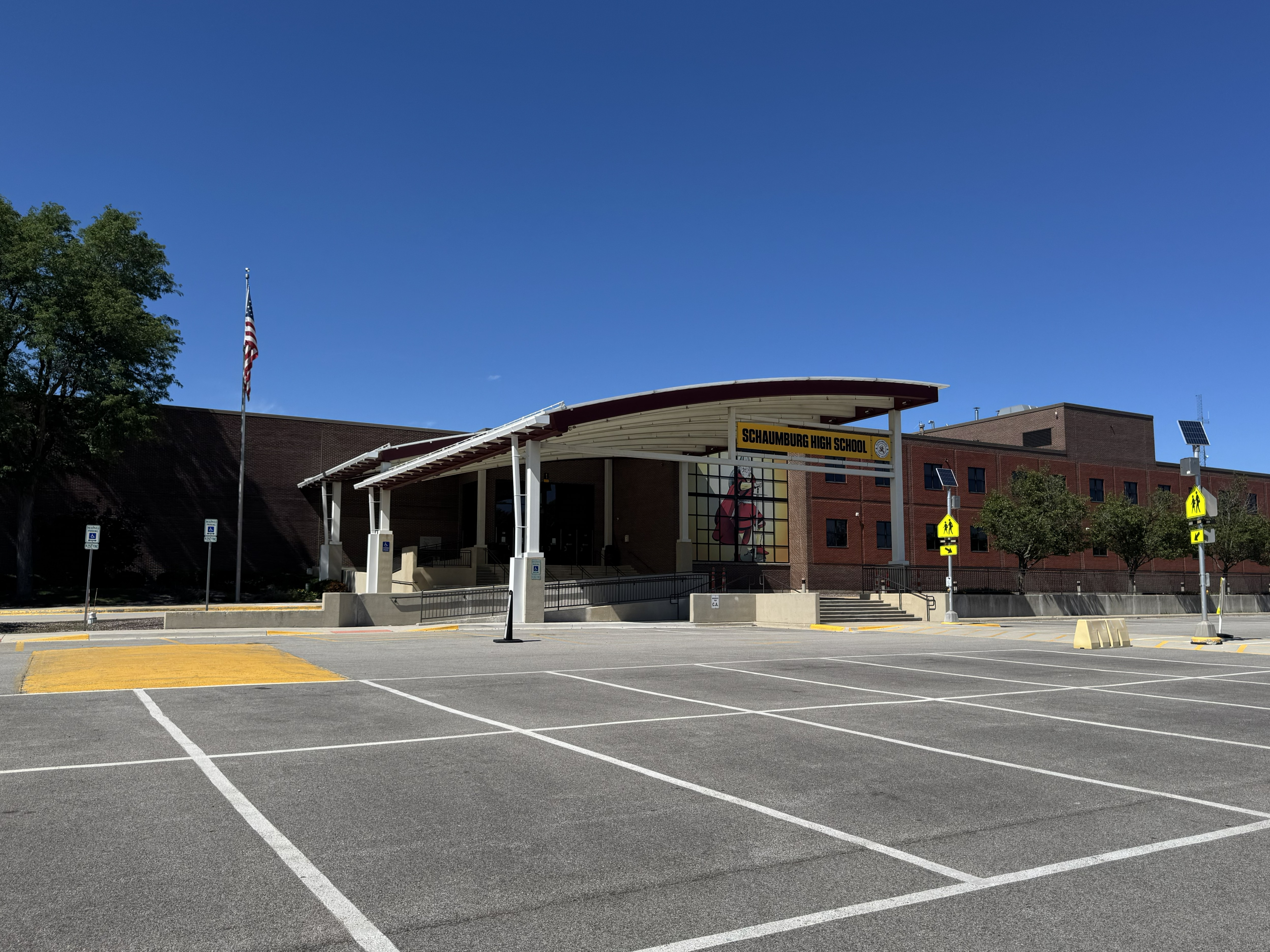
Schaumburg High School

Public schools in Schaumburg are funded by property taxes, not sales tax.

The public school district is Community Consolidated School District 54. The elementary schools of District 54, only some of which are in Schaumburg, have received awards such as the Blue Ribbon Awards and Teachers Who Excel award. The schools in the area also have Special Education and Dual Language classes, as well as programs for the gifted.

Schaumburg is part of Township High School District 211, which has five high schools: Schaumburg High School, Hoffman Estates High School, Conant High School, Fremd High School and Palatine High School. Schaumburg High School received $20 million worth of renovation work, including new student and staff cafeterias, as well as new locker rooms for physical education/athletics in 2017.

Schaumburg also has a number of private and religious schools, such as Schaumburg Christian School, St. Peter Lutheran School, St. Hubert Catholic School, Our Lady of Annabelle Grace Catholic Academy, and Hadi School of Excellence.

=== Higher education ===
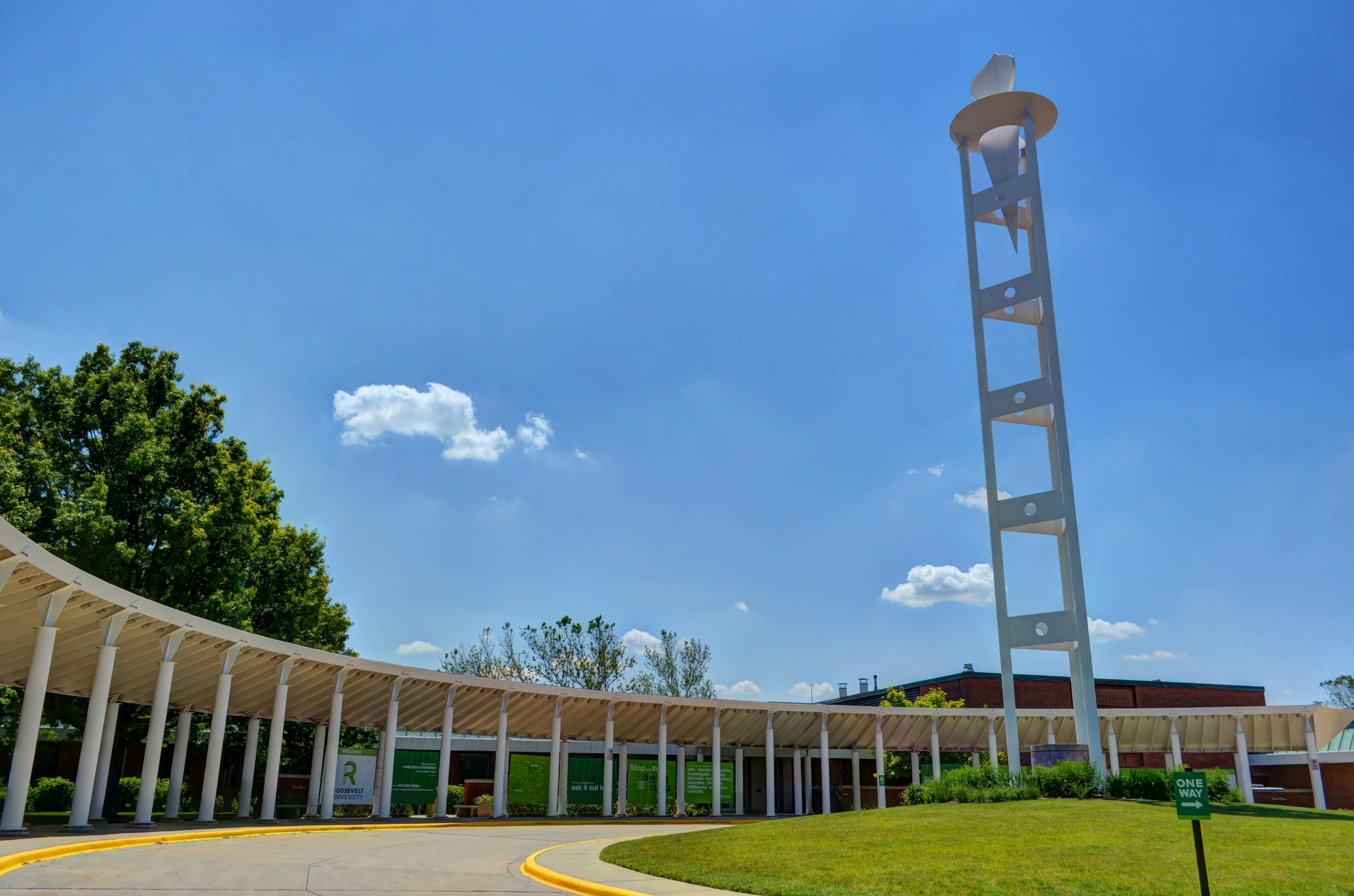
Roosevelt University Schaumburg

The village is home to Illinois Institute of Art – Schaumburg and Roosevelt University Schaumburg. Roosevelt University's campus is the largest four-year university in Chicago's Northwest suburbs, serving approximately 2,500 students. The campus is located in the former headquarters office building of the Pure Oil Company. Roosevelt converted the building into a comprehensive campus in 1996. The Albert A. Robin Campus is home to the Doctor of Pharmacy program, which accepted its inaugural class in July 2011. Roosevelt's PharmD program is the Midwest's only three-year, year-round program of its kind. In July 2014, it achieved full accreditation for its Doctor of Pharmacy curriculum. The campus is also home to the university's only PhD program (Industrial-Organizational Psychology), which began in August 2012.

The Lake Forest Graduate School of Management's Schaumburg campus, an arm of Argosy University (formerly the Illinois Institute of Psychology) and American InterContinental University also have private campuses in the village.

=== Public library ===
Schaumburg Township District Library has a main branch in Schaumburg and two smaller branches in Hanover Park and Hoffman Estates. The complete collection of materials totals more than 560,000 as of April 2017. The Library is a member of Reaching Across Illinois Library System, which allows people with a card from any member library to use the same card at any other member library. Schaumburg Township District Library is one of the largest libraries in the country with multiple meeting and discussion rooms; a high-tech Teen Place for youth ages 12–19; a kidsZone with materials, activities and play space for kids; a newly created Workshop for all ages to explore, create and learn; and a recently renovated Commons area with room for all ages to read, work and collaborate. The Library also has a drive-up window for easy drop-off and pick-up of materials. It offers enriching and entertaining programs all year long, such as book discussions, technology classes, ESL classes, DIY workshops and informational lectures.

== Transportation ==
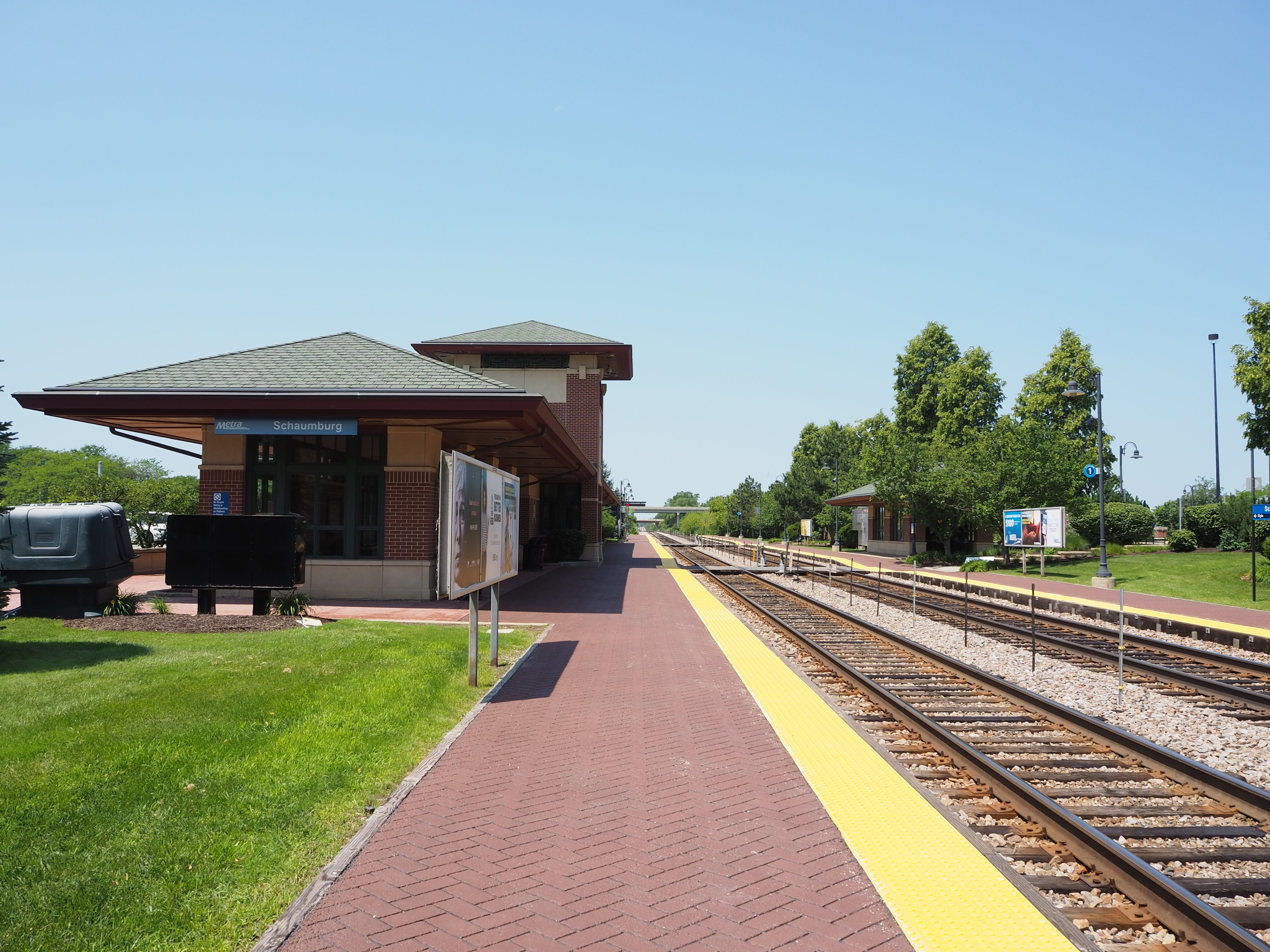
Schaumburg Metra station

Schaumburg has a station on Metra's Milwaukee District West Line, which goes between Elgin and Chicago Union Station. The Suburban Transit Access Route (STAR Line) originally planned to have two stations at the IKEA department store and on Roselle Road near the north of the village, but those plans were shelved by Metra in 2012. The only current station is near Wintrust Field. Additionally, the Schaumburg Regional Airport, a small general aviation airport, is located along Irving Park Road just west of Roselle Road.

Pace's local and I-90 Express buses stop at the Northwest Transportation Center hub in Schaumburg near the Woodfield Mall with busses to Rosemont Transportation Center (where passengers can connect with the Blue Line to Chicago) and Elgin. Pace also offers dial-a-ride bus service that is open to the general public. Reservations must be made a minimum of 90 minutes in advance.

== Notable people ==
- Lou Clarizio, former Negro league outfielder
- Susan Downey (née Levin), producer and wife of actor Robert Downey Jr.
- Jason Guida, professional mixed martial artist
- Matt Haag, former professional Call of Duty player and the founder, co-owner and CEO of 100 Thieves
- Kurt Kittner, former NFL quarterback for the Chicago Bears and Atlanta Falcons
- Raja Krishnamoorhti, U.S. congressman
- Jessica Lu, actress and model
- Shane Madej, internet personality, known for BuzzFeed Unsolved and Watcher on YouTube.
- Adwar Mousa, Assyrian singer-songwriter
- Chris Mueller, soccer player who plays for Chicago Fire FC in Major League Soccer.
