= Wintrust Field =

Stadium located in Illinois, U.S.

Coordinates: 41°59′34.18″N 88°7′5.12″W

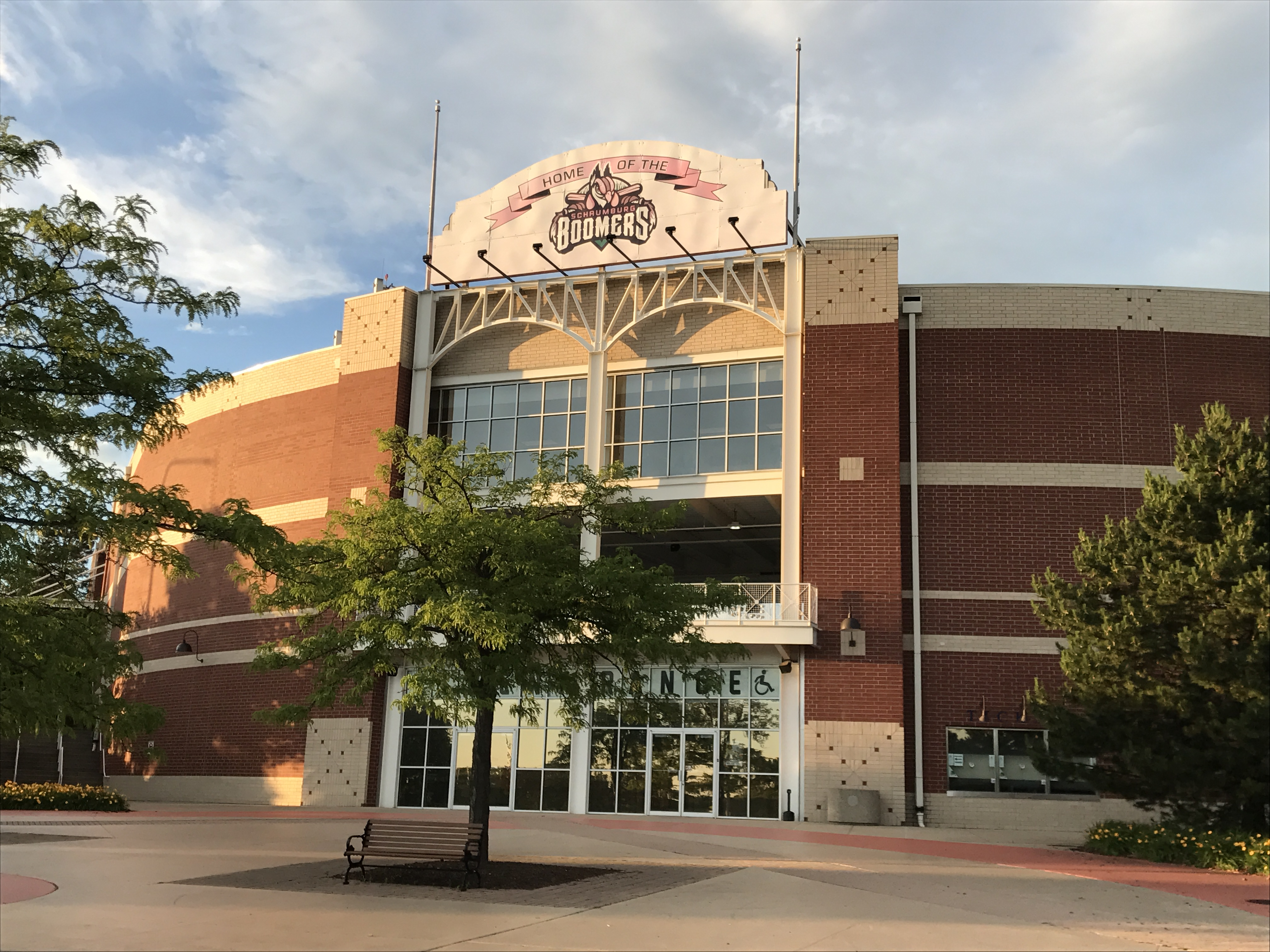
- The outside of Wintrust Field (then Boomers Stadium) in June 2017
- Interactive map of Wintrust Field
- Former names: Schaumburg Baseball Stadium (1999); Alexian Field (2000–2011); Boomers Stadium (2011–2020)
- Location: 1999 South Springinsguth Road; Schaumburg, Illinois 60193
- Owner: Village of Schaumburg
- Operator: Schaumburg Boomers
- Capacity: Baseball: 6,000 (1999–2013); 5,665 (2013–present) (7,365 with lawn seating); Concerts: 10,000
- Surface: Natural grass
- Record attendance: 8,918 (July 27, 2009)
- Field size: Left - 355 ft (108 m); Left-center - 368 ft (112 m); Center - 400 ft (120 m); Right-center - 368 ft (112 m); Right - 353 ft (108 m)
- Public transit: MDW at Schaumburg

Construction
- Groundbreaking: July 10, 1998; 28 years ago
- Built: 1999; 27 years ago
- Opened: May 27, 1999; 27 years ago
- Cost: $19 million ($36.7 million in 2025 dollars)
- Architect: Sink Combs Dethlefs
- General contractor: Turner Construction

Tenants
- Schaumburg Boomers (NAPB) (2012–present); Schaumburg Flyers (NL) (1999–2010); Chicago Tornadoes (Pro Cricket) (2004); Dominican Stars (NCAA) (2008–present); Wheaton Thunder (NCAA) (2009–2010); Roosevelt Lakers (NAIA) (2011–2012)

Wintrust Field is a baseball stadium in Schaumburg, Illinois. It is the home to the Schaumburg Boomers of the National Association of Professional Baseball (NAPB), which began play in 2012 and captured their first championship in 2013. It is primarily used for baseball, and was the home field of the Schaumburg Flyers baseball team from 1999 through 2010 before the Boomers resurrected the facility for pro baseball in 2012.

With a maximum capacity of 7,365 fans, Wintrust Field features 5,665 fixed seats, which includes 16 luxury suites and bleacher seating for 200 people in left field. An additional 900 fans can be accommodated in the lawn area down both the left and right field lines. Its field dimensions mimic those of Chicago's Wrigley Field, and the land the stadium is built on was originally purchased in the mid-1980s as a hopeful site for the New Wrigley Field, had the City of Chicago and the Chicago Cubs not come to terms to bring night baseball to the North Side. Some pro lacrosse as well as professional and amateur softball has also been played at Wintrust Field due to the late start (mid-May) of the independent baseball season.

The stadium itself is located west of I-355 off the Elgin–O'Hare Expressway. Now called Wintrust Field, the Alexian Brothers Medical Center in nearby Elk Grove purchased the naming rights to the ballpark in 2000. The stadium was the home of the Schaumburg Flyers from its opening through the end of the 2010 season. At that point, the village and park district which owned the stadium began eviction proceedings against the Flyers for failure to pay $551,800 in back rent. On February 24, 2011, a Cook County court ruled the Flyers could be evicted, ordered the now defunct team to pay the back rent, and the naming rights contract was terminated when there was no professional baseball played in the park in 2011.

From 2009 to 2010, the Wheaton College Thunder, a Division III baseball program, played its home games at Wintrust Field, and since 2008 the Dominican University Stars another Division III baseball program has played a majority of it home games at Wintrust Field. In 2011, the Roosevelt Lakers, an NAIA baseball program, played its home games at the stadium as well.

Later that year, in September 2011, Chicago attorney Patrick A. Salvi was awarded ownership of a Frontier League franchise that began play in May 2012. Salvi is also the owner of the American Association's Gary SouthShore RailCats. The franchise is known as the Schaumburg Boomers named after the "booming dance" of the male Greater Prairie Chicken and the team earned a 54–42 record during its Inaugural Season, falling one win short of a playoff berth.

In just the franchise's second season in 2013, the Schaumburg Boomers captured the first-ever pro baseball championship for the Village of Schaumburg in impressive fashion. After capturing the league's best record in the regular season (59-37), the Boomers became the first team in the Frontier League's 14-year history to sweep through the playoffs with a 6–0 record en route to claiming the 2013 Frontier League Championship. In doing so, the Boomers made good on a promise to win title in the "first 100 years or your money back." The guarantee was featured on a billboard announcing the new team in March 2012 before the club's first season got underway.

In October 2019, the Village of Schaumburg purchased the portion of the stadium which was owned by Schaumburg Park District for $1 million, becoming sole owner of the stadium.

It was the Chicago White Sox's alternate training site in 2020 when the COVID-19 pandemic forced the cancellation of the Frontier League campaign and the abbreviation of the Major League Baseball season.
