= Campanelli =

Campanelli is an Italian surname, which may refer to:

== People ==
- Alfred Campanelli (1925–2003), American real-estate developer
- Lou Campanelli (1938–2023), American basketball coach
- Manuela Campanelli (science journalist) (born 1962), Italian science journalist
- Manuela Campanelli (scientist), American professor of astrophysics
- Pauline Campanelli (1943–2001), American artist
- Rick Campanelli (born 1970), Canadian television personality
- Stephen Campanelli, Canadian movie cameraman and film director

=== Fictional characters ===
- Tessa Campanelli, character in the television series Degrassi High

== Other uses ==
- Campanelli (Italian for "little bells"), another term for a glockenspiel
- Campanelli Stadium, a baseball stadium in Brockton, Massachusetts, U.S.
- The Campanelli's Picnic, a 1972 Argentine film
- The Country of the Campanelli, a 1954 Italian-French comedy film

== See also ==
- Campanelle, variety of pasta
