= Schaumburg Township District Library =

Library in Schaumburg, Illinois, US

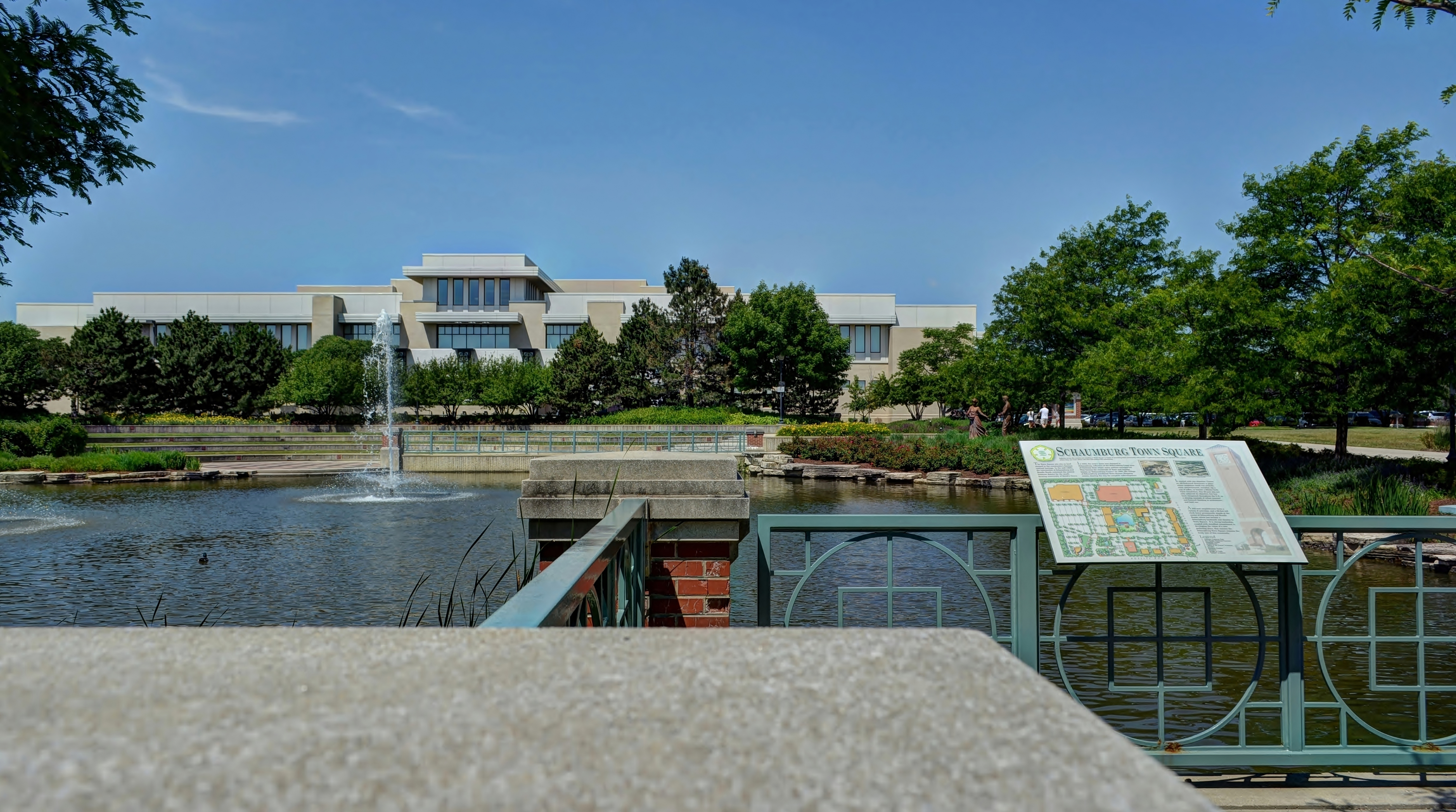
- Schaumburg Township District Library as seen from the Schaumburg Town Square.
- 42°01′31.67″N 88°04′59.84″W
- Location: Schaumburg, Illinois, United States
- Type: Public
- Established: 1962
- Branches: 3

Collection
- Size: 600,000

Access and use
- Circulation: 2 million (2005)
- Population served: 130,000 (2025)

Other information
- Director: Annie Miskewitch
- Website: www.schaumburglibrary.org

The Schaumburg Township District Library (STDL), located in Schaumburg, Illinois, is the second largest public library in Illinois. It serves approximately 130,000 residents in the Schaumburg Township area, covering sections of Schaumburg, Hoffman Estates, Hanover Park, Roselle, and Elk Grove Village. Both Hoffman Estates and Hanover Park have branch libraries located in the villages. Annual circulation of materials totals approximately two million items, while nearly one million people visit the library each year.

The 166,000-square-foot (15,400 m^{2}) central library provides patrons with the use of more than 180 computers and access to more than 600,000 items, including books, DVDs, CDs, computer software, and more. Special features include a glass sculpture by internationally renowned artist Dale Chihuly, paintings by Meryl Langsdorf, as well as a diverse range of other works by famous artists. Additionally, the library features a fireplace, an original illustration gallery, and a café. The Youth Services Department has a unique Enchanted Forest area displaying well-known children's book characters and offering a kid-friendly atmosphere for reading or game playing.

== History ==
The library dates back to 1962, when local voters approved a tax funding mechanism for the Schaumburg Township Public Library. In 1963, a collection was established in a small home near the intersection of Roselle and Schaumburg Roads. A dedicated facility was constructed and opened in 1965. In 1968, a lower level and the Children's Department were added to the library.

In 1970, a referendum for a larger library passed, but did not result in the construction of a new building; instead, an addition to the library was completed by 1987. The library also opened branches in Hoffman Estates (in 1992) and Hanover Park (in 1993). Another referendum for a larger central library passed in 1995, and construction on the current building in Schaumburg Town Square began in 1997. The central library moved into the building in 1998.

In 2012, the library opened its Teen Place. On December 28, 2016, the library opened The Commons, an area including the lobby and audiovisual departments. In 2020, the library undertook renovations on its first floor. Subsequently, in 2024, additional renovations were conducted, primarily targeting the second floor, attempting to create “updated, innovative spaces with a modern look that still reflects the building's original prairie-style architecture.” This project included the establishment of an Innovation Hub and a local history room. In the same year, the library completed the implementation of an automated materials handler.

== Time Capsule ==
In 1998, STDL created a time capsule containing documents about the "future" of 2023. The Time Capsule is located outside near the entrance at the Central Branch (Schaumburg Town Square). The library opened the time capsule on September 23, 2023. They replaced the time capsule with a new one after the ceremony, which will be opened 50 years later in 2073.

== Artwork ==
The Schaumburg Township District Library houses several notable art pieces and installations throughout its facilities, particularly in the Central Library. The second floor features a large glass sculpture created by renowned artist Dale Chihuly. The second floor also features paintings by Meryl Langsdorf, most known as the designer of the world-renowned Doomsday Clock. The library purchased six paintings between 2001 and 2006, cooperating with Langsdorf to refurbish the paintings. In April of 2025, the library installed a seventh work by Langsdorf, a triptych of the Hoover Dam, following a donation from the Langsdorf family. The piece was installed after an extensive restoration process in collaboration with The Conservation Center in Chicago.

== Local History Digital Archive ==
In 2001, the library initiated a Local History Digital Archive. The archive is a collection of digitized photographs, videos, and documents relating to Schaumburg Township history. To date, over 60,000 items have been posted on the archive and are viewable through either a keyword search or browsing by subject. Each item also has its own record, which, in many cases, includes any history or commentary on the item being viewed. Items date back to the 1840s, when Schaumburg Township was first surveyed.

In addition to the digital archive, the library also maintains a blog on the History of Schaumburg Township (HOST).

== Departments ==
Being the second largest public library in Illinois, the main branch is broken up into the following departments:

- Audiovisual
- Circulation
- Computer Assistance
- New Books and Fiction
- Non-Fiction and Reference
- Teen Place
- Youth Services

There are more departments within STDL, including Extension Services, Graphics, Public Relations, and IT. The above list includes only the departments available to the public, which are disclosed to help visitors navigate the library more easily.

== Awards ==
- 1999: Commercial Building Award of Excellence Merit Award
- 2005: 101 Best & Brightest Companies to Work For
- 2010: Al Larson Environmental Award

== See also ==
- Schaumburg, Illinois
