= Schaumburg Flyers =

| Logo | Cap insignia |

Information
- League: Northern League (1993–2010)
- Location: Schaumburg, Illinois
- Ballpark: Alexian Field (1999–2010)
- Founded: 1993
- Disbanded: 2011
- League championships: 0
- Division championships: 3 (1999, 2004, 2006)
- Former name: Schaumburg Flyers (1999–2010); Thunder Bay Whiskey Jacks (1993–98)
- Colors: Navy, burnt orange, khaki, white
- Ownership: Richard Ehrenreich, John E. Hughes, Mike Conley, Minority owners included Hub Arkush, Brad Saul
- General manager: Scott Boor
- Manager: Ron Kittle
- Media: Schaumburg Review (Arlington Heights) Daily Herald

The Schaumburg Flyers were a professional baseball team based in Schaumburg, Illinois, in the United States. The team played in the Northern League from 1999 to 2010, with their home games at Alexian Field, near the Elgin O'Hare Expressway. They formerly played in Thunder Bay, Ontario, where they were known as the Thunder Bay Whiskey Jacks.

The Flyers were also the first minor league baseball team to have several of their games aired on a major market radio station during their inaugural season of 1999, WMAQ AM 670 in Chicago. Three Sunday afternoon games were broadcast that first season.

== History ==
In 1999, the Flyers hired their first manager, Ron Kittle, best known for his playing days with the Chicago White Sox. The former Chicago Cubs and White Sox player Greg Hibbard was the pitching coach. Kittle did a series of TV commercials to promote the team, using the gimmick "Ma Kittle," portraying both himself and his "Ma." The ads sparked interest as the Flyers hoped to steal away fans from the nearby Kane County Cougars. The campaign mimicked the highly successful Converse ads in which basketball star Larry Johnson starred as both himself and "Gramama." After the 2001 season, however, Kittle resigned as manager, with Jim Boynewicz hired to replace him.

In 2004, the Flyers made it to the Northern League Championship Series against the St. Paul Saints. Despite leading the five-game series 2–1, Schaumburg eventually lost the championship. In Game 5, Flyers relief pitcher Lyle Prempas allowed a game-winning grand slam by St. Paul infielder Marc Mirizzi in the ninth inning.

The Flyers appeared in the Northern League Playoffs four times (1999, 2003, 2004, 2006) but never won the championship. Among those who played for the Flyers were former Oakland A's outfielder Ozzie Canseco and former Chicago Cubs outfielders Dwight Smith and Brant Brown, as well as, very briefly, John Henry Williams, son of Ted Williams.

On July 27, 2009, the Flyers played host to Battle of the Sexes II, which pitted the Flyers against the National Pro Fastpitch Softball Champions, the Chicago Bandits, featuring star pitcher Jennie Finch. Played by official softball rules, the game was seen by an overflow record crowd of 8,918, and was won by the Bandits 4–2.

== Year-by-year record ==
| | | First Half | | Second Half | | Overall |
| Season | Division | W-L | Finish | W-L | Finish | W-L | Win% | Playoffs |
|---|---|---|---|---|---|---|---|---|
| 1999 | East | 19-24 | 1st | 25-18 | 1st | 44–42 | .512 | Lost Central semi-final |
| 2000 | East | 18–25 | 4th | 20–23 | 4th | 38–48 | .442 | Did not qualify |
| 2001 | North | 18–27 | 3rd | 19–26 | 3rd | 37–53 | .411 | Did not qualify |
| 2002 | South | 19–24 | 4th | 16–29 | 5th | 35–53 | .398 | Did not qualify |
| 2003 | East | 25–19 | 3rd | 22–22 | 2nd | 47–41 | .534 | Lost semi-final |
| 2004 | South | 31-17 | 1st | 27–21 | 2nd | 58–38 | .604 | Lost championship series |
| 2005 | South | 16–32 | 6th | 22–26 | 4th | 38–58 | .396 | Did not qualify |
| 2006 | South | 31–17 | 1st | 15–33 | 4th | 46–50 | .479 | Lost division final |
| 2007 | South | 20–28 | 3rd | 19–29 | 4th | 39–57 | .406 | Did not qualify |
| 2008 | N/A | 30–66 | 6th | N/A | N/A | 30–66 | .313 | Did not qualify |
| 2009 | N/A | 43–53 | 5th | N/A | N/A | 43–53 | .448 | Did not qualify |
| 2010 | N/A | 41–59 | 7th | N/A | N/A | 41–59 | .410 | Did not qualify |

=== 2006 and 2007 seasons ===
For the second half of the 2006 season, the Flyers and MSN partnered to let fans choose the Flyers lineups online. This program is called "Fan Club: Reality Baseball". The program also included online video segments that took fans through the season alongside the team with behind-the-scenes access.
The 2007 season saw the Flyers undergo some changes, most notably with the departure of '06 manager Andy McCauley to the Kansas City T-Bones. Steve Maddock became the fourth manager in Flyers history after McCauley left for Kansas City, and he quickly worked to build a team that had only one member carry over from the 2006 campaign. The road for Schaumburg that year proved to be difficult, as the Flyers could manage no more than 20 wins in either half of the season and failed to make the playoffs.

=== 2008 season ===
The Flyers struggled mightily through the 2008 season, dropping their final 14 contests and winning just 30 games. Manager Steve Maddock will not return for the following season, and only six players will don Flyers uniforms on Opening Day 2009. The Flyers did set attendance records on Bearon's Birthday, with 8,636 fans attending the Flyers game with the JackHammers on July 23.

=== 2009 season ===
February 18, 2009: Flyers hold Grand Reopening of The Schaumburg Club to a record off-season crowd of over 300 fans. Mayor Larson was on hand for the ribbon-cutting ceremony and local band 7th Heaven entertained fans and community partners until late in the evening.

May 21, 2009: Flyers prepare to unveil their new logo, accompanied by a new black jersey to be worn for all Friday night home games. Along with this new look, the Flyers teamed up with Rainbow Play Systems and Finish Stong Sports Academy to expand their Kidz Zone, located along the left field line.

May 22, 2009: Flyers starter Dustin Glant goes the distance, allowing just two runs en route to a 6–2 Flyers home-opener victory over the JackHammers in front of 5,288 fans.

May 24, 2009: Glant earns season's first Northern League Pitcher of the Week honor, going 2–0 with a sparkling 1.13 ERA in his first two starts of the campaign.

May 25, 2009: Flyers turn second triple play in franchise history. With runners on first and second and in motion, Joliet's Wally Backman Jr. lined out to 2B Jose Valdez. Valdez threw to first for the second out, and 1B Jason Colson completed the play by firing to SS Travis Brown behind the lead runner at second.

June 6, 2009: Richard Mercado blasts season's first walk-off homer at Alexian to top Kansas City 7–5, extending the Flyers win streak to a season-best eight games.

June 7, 2009: Flyers players sweep Northern League weekly awards, with Jeff Dunbar taking NL Player of the Week and Craig James earning NL Pitcher of the Week.

June 28, 2009: Forty-three-year-old former big-leaguer and Flyers DH Felix Jose improves OBP to season-high .457, a .050 lead over the Northern League's second best.

June 30, 2009: A Northern League-best nine Flyers are named to the Great Lakes All-Star roster. Honorees are DH Felix Jose, 3B Vince Harrison, OF Jeff Dunbar, 2B Jose Valdez, OF Victor Ferrante, and pitchers Dustin Glant, Cephas Howard, Ed Almonte, and Craig James.

July 16, 2009: Hundreds storm the infield at Alexian for the first Richard Allen Jewelers Diamond Dig. Participants are given Popsicle sticks to dig the infield dirt in search of a $1,500 diamond gold ring, which becomes the property of the lucky finder, no strings attached.

July 27, 2009: An Alexian Field record crowd of 8,918 witnesses the much-anticipated Battle of the Sexes, as the National Pro Fast-Pitch Softball's Chicago Bandits defeats the Flyers 4–2 in a game governed by official softball rules.

July 30, 2009: Mayor proclaims Rotary Night. Rotarians and their guests account for 5,000 of the 5,596 people at the game.

August 8, 2009: Flyers ride Dustin Glant to 7–2 win over Winnipeg, sealing their first series win at CanWest Park since 2006 and notching back-to-back victories for the first time in nearly a month.

August 25, 2009: Flyers RF Victor Ferrante named Northern League Player of the Week, leading the league during the seven-day stretch in total bases (23), RBI (9) and slugging percentage (.920), while batting .440 (11-for-25) with seven runs scored, four doubles, a triple, and two home runs in the week.

August 31, 2009: Flyers lead the Northern league in win increase from 2008 to 2009 as well as highest attendance increase from 2008 to 2009.

September 16, 2009: Cephas Howard named Northern League Rookie Pitcher of the Year, and shortstop Travis Brown named Northern League Defensive Player of the Year for the 2009 campaign.

=== 2010 season ===
May 20, 2010: Flyers win the season opener with a 10–2 rout in Rockford. Dustin Glant gives up only one earned run on six hits and one walk in seven innings of work to earn the win. Richard Mercardo and Mike Mooney blast their first home runs of the season.

May 28, 2010: The Flyers come onto Alexian Field under the temporary team name of Schaumburg Pilots. The Pilots name was upheld throughout the Stanley Cup Finals as a sign of support for the hometown Chicago Blackhawks as they took on (and beat) the Philadelphia Flyers in 6 games. The Pilots beat the Gary Southshore Railcats 5–3 for the team's first home win of the season.

June 1, 2010: Pilots win 6–5 over the Fargo-Moorhead Redhawks. Richard Mercado hit a two-run homer, and Andre Marshall hit a walk off solo home run to seal the game for the Pilots.

June 19, 2010: Ryan Gehring strikes out eight Kansas City T-Bones and allows only five hits en route to a 4–1 Flyers victory. Gehring picked up the win in his first start of the season.

June 21, 2010: Dustin Glant tosses a complete-game shutout as the Flyers win 2–0 over Joliet. The righty allowed five hits while striking out seven batters. Joey Gomes hit an RBI single in the first inning, and Andre Marshall added a solo home run in the fourth to give the Flyers all they would need for the victory.

June 22, 2010: University of Illinois head football coach Ron Zook and head basketball coach Bruce Weber were on hand to witness a 9–5 Flyers victory on Illini night at Alexian Field.

June 23, 2010: The Flyers knocked off the Jackhammers in dramatic style with a bottom of the ninth walk-off double by Joe Pauley for a 5–4 win, securing Schaumburg's first series sweep of the season. Joey Gomes stretched his league leading hit streak to 18 games, going 3–4 with three singles.

June 25, 2010: Flyers need just three hits to secure a 4–3 victory over the Lake County Fielders. Joey Gomes drew two walks in the game, but did not collect a hit, snapping his 19-game hit streak.

June 26, 2010: Flyers win their sixth straight game. Dustin Glant pitched 8.2 strong innings before being pulled in a bases loaded jam in the top of the ninth. Evans was able to strike out the Fielder's Brian McFall to seal the win for Glant and pick up the save.

July 7, 2010: Flyers sweep their series against the Rockford Riverhawks, winning both games of a double-header. Richard Mercado and Joe Nowicki smacked solo home runs for the Flyers in the first game, and Matt Elliott picked up the win in the 5–2 victory. In the second game, Ron Bourquin drew a game-winning bases-loaded walk in the eleventh inning to score Ruddy Yan and win 4–3.

July 14, 2010: Dustin Glant and Richard Mercado represent the Schaumburg Flyers in the Northern League All-Star game in Tucson, Arizona. Mercado notched a hit and Glant pitched one inning of relief, giving up one earned run on two hits to go along with a strikeout. The Northern League All-Stars cruised past the Golden League All-Stars 9–3.

July 24, 2010: Dustin Glant tosses a complete-game gem, his second of the year, as the Flyers beat the Winnipeg Goldeyes 4–2. Glant allowed just two runs on eight hits with four strikeouts and two walks.

July 28, 2010: Newly inducted Hall of Famer Andre Dawson hosts a celebrity softball event at Alexian Field following the Flyers game against Joliet. The Hawk suited up in front of a lively crowd with several other baseball greats and celebrities, including Dale Murphy, Gary Sheffield, Don Zimmer, Vida Blue, Steve McMichael, and Giuliana and Bill Rancic.

July 31, 2010: The Flyers beat the Fargo-Moorhead RedHawks 9–7 in an impressive display of offense by both teams at Alexian Field. Ruddy Yan hit an inside-the-park home run that scored two.

August 2, 2010: Joey Gomes hit two home runs to blast the Flyers past the Riverhawks 12–5. Gomes finished his remarkable night 3–5 with two homers, a double, five RBI, and three runs scored. Mario Delgado returned to the Flyers with a bang as he launched a Brett Durand offering over the center field fence in the second inning.

August 11, 2010: Alain Quijano was almost unhittable at Alexian Field. The lefty tossed a one-hit shutout as the Flyers earned a 4–0 win over the Lake County Fielders. It took 116 pitches for Quijano to finish the complete game, striking out seven Fielders along the way. It was the fourth complete game of the season for the Flyers.

August 15, 2010: Dustin Glant is named Northern League Player of the Week. Glant went 2–0 in two starts with a 1.80 ERA during the week.

August 29, 2010: Flyers sweep Fielders 9–4. Dustin Glant picked up his ninth win of the year, and Kit Pellow and Chris Schultz each hit homers for the Flyers. The first three batters set the tone for the Flyers as Travis Brown led off with a triple. Ruddy Yan followed with a RBI single and Kit Pellow stepped up next with a two-run blast to left field for an early 3–0 lead. The Flyers would tack on another run in the second inning with another RBI single from Ruddy Yan. The Fielders would get their four runs sparingly in the game as Higgins led off in the third inning with a double and would eventually come to score. Chris Schultz got the hitting going again in the 4th inning. A big two RBI double followed by Ruddy Yan's third RBI single would make the game 7–1 after four innings. Fielders scored in the sixth inning off a solo home run by Cody Strait, but the Flyers would get the run back in same fashion from Chris Schultz. Mario Delgado followed with a RBI double to finish off the Flyers scoring and putting the lead at 9–2 after six innings. The Fielders would get two more runs in the top of the 8th inning with Cody Strait and Adam Hale getting back to back hits, while both would round the bases to score. Dustin Glant picked up his ninth win of the season, going seven innings, allowing two runs on ten hits with three strikeouts. Alec Lewis got the loss for the Fielders, allowing seven runs in 3.2 innings on ten hits.

September 1, 2010: Flyers pitcher Brian McCullough is named the Northern League's Pitcher of the Month for August. McCullough allowed only one earned run during August and owned a 3–0 record with a 1.33 ERA in the month. He also had 5 saves during that span, while appearing in 12 games.

September 5, 2010 – Going into their final game, the Flyers entered Sunday's game up 2–0 in the final series against Winnipeg, and looked to finish the season on a high note with a sweep of the Goldeyes. However, with a late two-RBI double in the 8th inning, Winnipeg shut down those hopes and defeated the Flyers 4–3 in the final game of the 2010 season. The scoring began early off a Chris Schultz home run, his fourth of the season, putting the Flyers up 1–0 in the second inning. Winnipeg would get that run back in the top of the third as Price Kendall hits a single, advanced on a stolen base, and scored on a Kevin West RBI single to tie the game 1–1. Neither team would score until Juan Diaz stepped up to the plate against Alain Quijano in the 6th inning. Diaz connected for his 24th homer of the season, and his 75th RBI to help the Goldeyes take the lead 2–1. The lead would not last long, as the Flyers would answer in the bottom half of the inning. Ruddy Yan got on base with a single and Joey Gomes would drive him in to tie the game 2–2 after six. Once more in the game, back-to-back scoring frames would occur starting with Winnipeg in the top of the 8th inning. Justice would have the game winning 2-RBI single to make the score 4–2, leaving the Flyers left to answer in the bottom half of the inning. Mario Delgado got things rolling with a double, Brett Harker came in to pinch-run, and eventually scored on Gomes' second RBI single of the game, his 53rd RBI of the season. There seemed to be a late surge in the bottom of the ninth, as the Flyers put two on base with two outs to go, but Ruddy Yan could not come through in the clutch, as the Flyers ended their season with a suspenseful 4–3 loss to the Winnipeg Goldeyes, giving the Flyers a 41–59 mark for the year. A tough loss for Alain Quijano, who pitched a complete game, allowing four runs on seven hits with six strikeouts, ending the season with a 3.77 ERA. Chad Benefield would be credited with his first career win as a professional pitcher, throwing 1.2 innings in relief of Goldeyes starter Jason Mackintosh.

September 15, 2010: Travis Brown is named the Northern League's Top Defensive Player of the Year for the second consecutive season. Brown led all shortstops with 330 assists and 522 total chances, committing only 20 errors (.962), and helping the Flyers post the best fielding percentage in the league (.977).

November 18, 2010: Flyers join newly formed North American Baseball League. The league was formed by members of the Golden Baseball League, the Northern League, and the United League.

== Latter years and disbandment ==
Toward the end of the 2010 season, in late August, Rich Ehrenreich's operating company for the team, Schaumburg Professional Baseball, L.L.C., was stripped of its business registration for nonpayment of sales and withholding taxes. Heavily in debt, Ehrenreich was attempting to sell the team since the beginning of the 2010 season to concentrate on the Lake County Fielders (which Ehrenrich co-owns under a separate operating company), and a proposed sale in June 2010 to Adriano Pedrelli had fallen through.

Despite troubles with Illinois tax officials, the Flyers signaled their intent to join the newly formed North American League in the winter of 2010, intending to play the 2011 season in that league. However, the Schaumburg Flyers were served an eviction notice from Alexian Field on February 24, with the team over $900,000 in arrears in rent on Alexian Field going back to 2007. A Cook County judge terminated the lease and ordering Flyers' ownership to pay the village and the Schaumburg Park District (the co-landlords) $551,828.92 in back rent (although the actual amount owed was $920,000 going back to 2007), with the eviction becoming final on March 6, 2011. Three days after the eviction notice became final, the owner of the Joliet Slammers, Alan Oremus, was awarded a new lease on the stadium. A new lease was signed by the new operating company, E.J.I., LLC, in July 2011, after which Oremus sold the franchise to local attorney Patrick A. Salvi. The replacement team, the Schaumburg Boomers, began play in 2012.

The assets of the Flyers were auctioned in April 2011, bringing an end to the franchise. The back rent, however, has not been collected by Schaumburg officials.
