= Schaumburg station =

Commuter rail station in Schaumburg, Illinois

Schaumburg

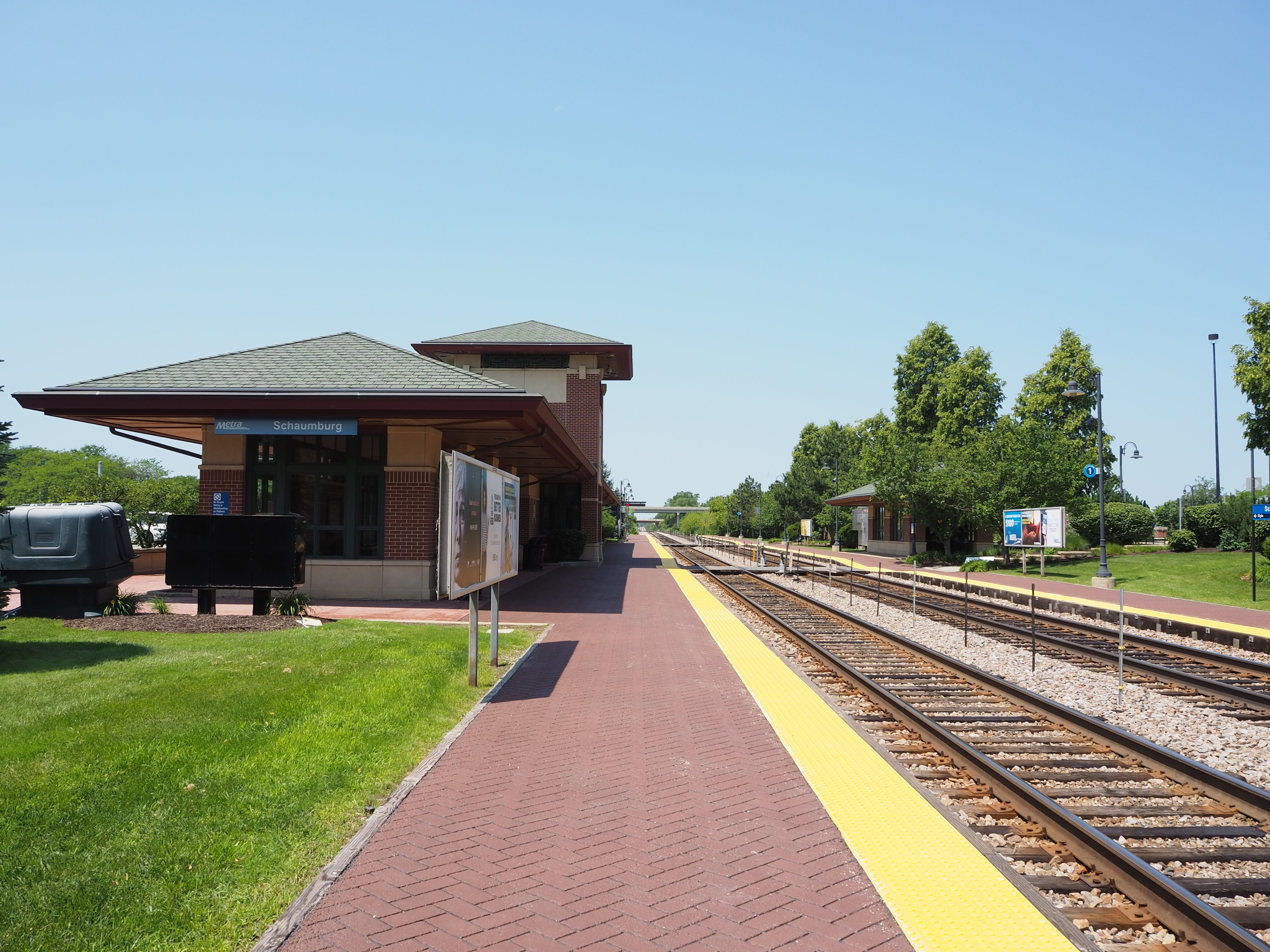
- Schaumburg station in July 2023

General information
- Location: 2000 South Springinsguth Road; Schaumburg, Illinois 60173
- Coordinates: 41.9891°N 88.1179°W
- Owner: Metra
- Line: Elgin Subdivision
- Platforms: 2 side platforms
- Tracks: 2

Construction
- Accessible: Yes

Other information
- Fare zone: 4

History
- Opened: November 1, 1982
- Rebuilt: 2004

Passengers
- 2018: 1,583 (average weekday) ▼8.3%
- Rank: 20 out of 236

Services
Preceding station	Metra	Following station
Hanover Park toward Big Timber/Elgin	Milwaukee District West	Roselle toward Union Station
Track layout
Location

Schaumburg is a station on Metra's Milwaukee District West Line in Schaumburg, Illinois. The station is 26.5 miles (42.6 km) away from Chicago Union Station, the eastern terminus of the line. In Metra's zone-based fare system, Schaumburg is in zone 4. As of 2018, Schaumburg is the 20th busiest of Metra's 236 non-downtown stations, with an average of 1,583 weekday boardings. The station is adjacent to Wintrust Field, home of the Schaumburg Boomers of the Frontier League.

As of February 15, 2024, Schaumburg is served by 42 trains (20 inbound, 22 outbound) on weekdays, by all 24 trains (12 in each direction) on Saturdays, and by all 18 trains (nine in each direction) on Sundays and holidays.

== Gallery ==
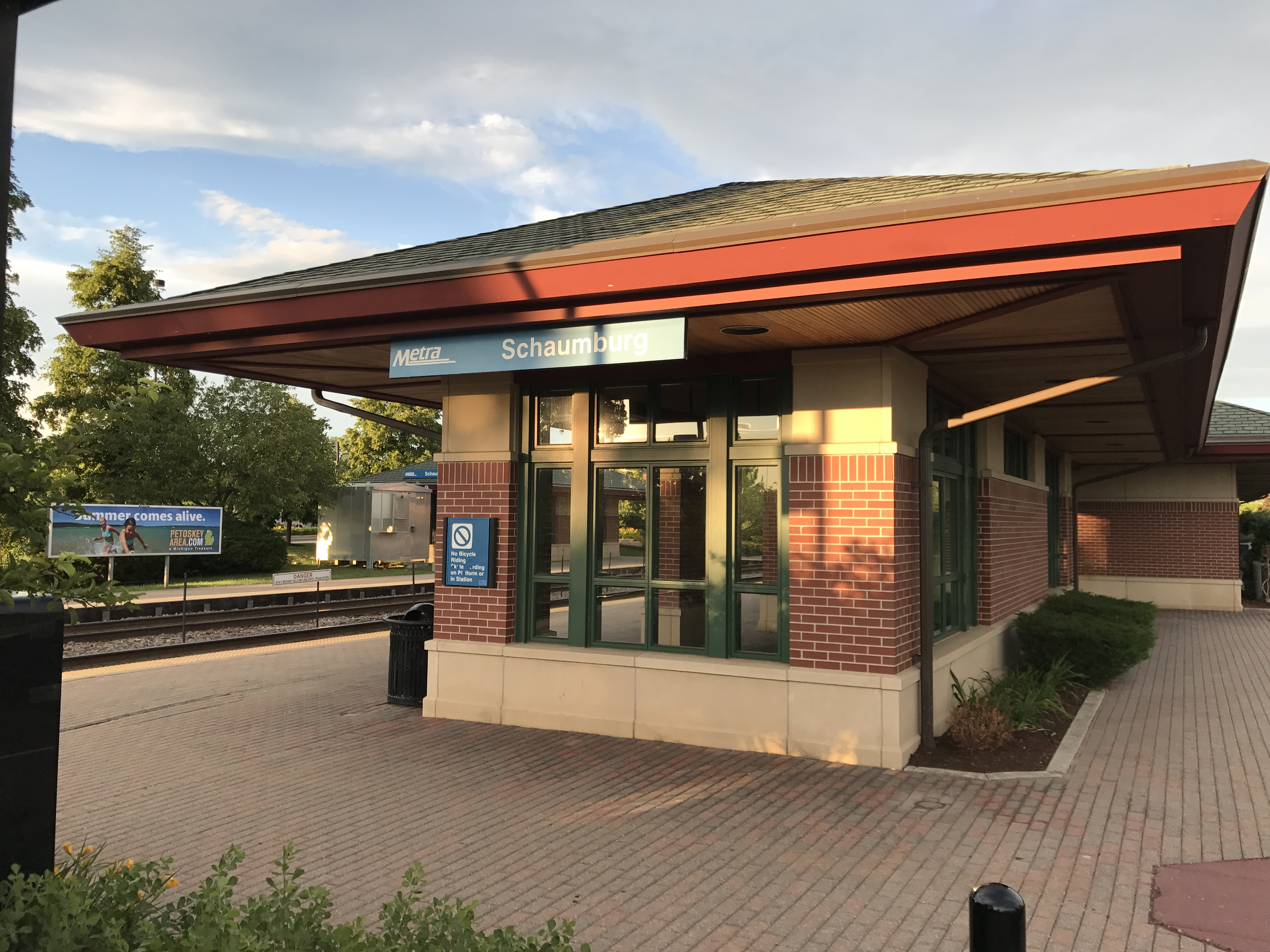
The station's west side

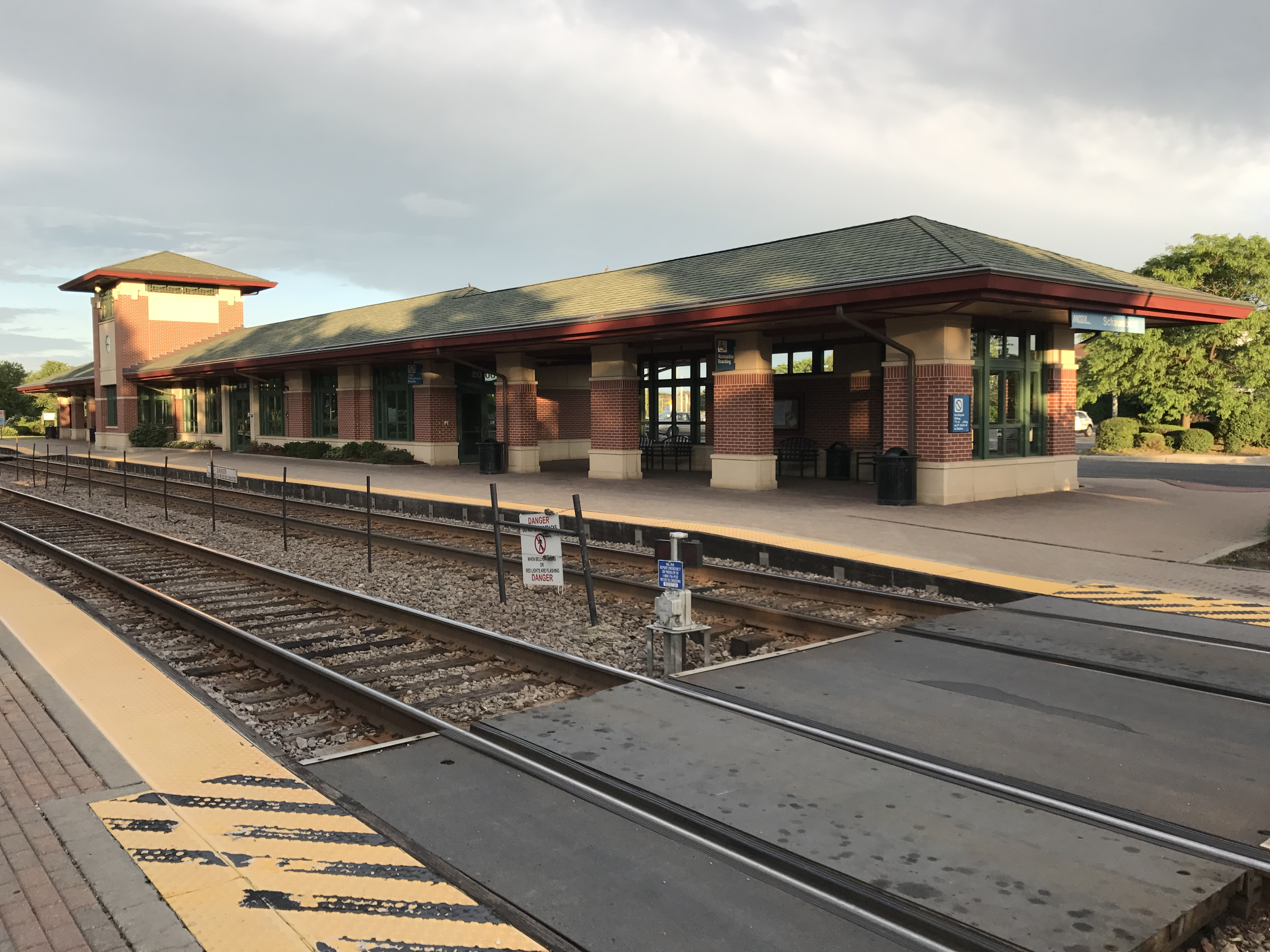
The station's north side.

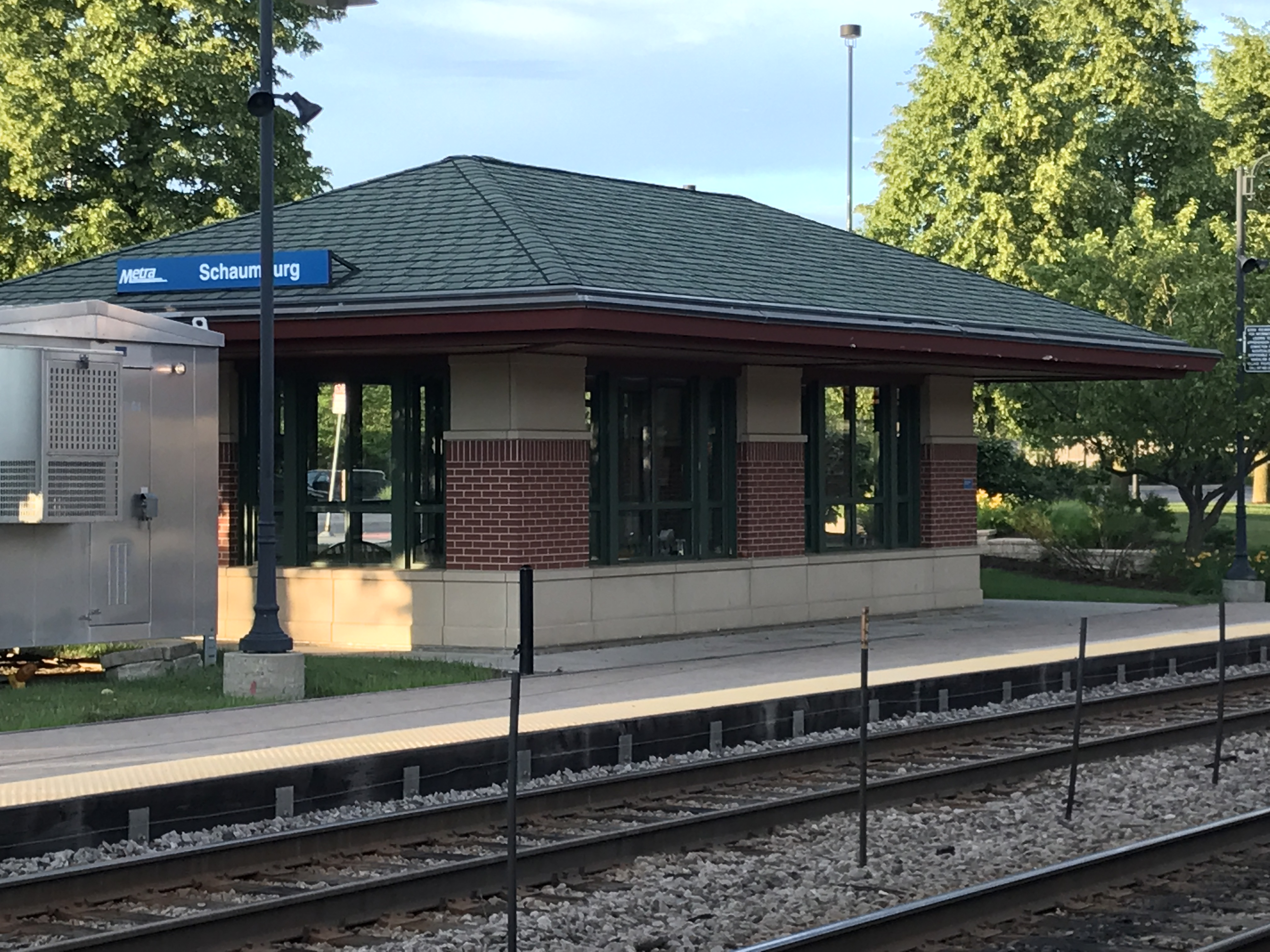
A shelter adjacent to the station.
