= Community Consolidated School District 54 =

School district in Illinois, United States

Address
- 524 East Schaumburg Road Schaumburg, Illinois, 60194; United States

District information
- Type: Public
- Grades: PK–8
- Schools: 28
- NCES District ID: 1734740

Students and staff
- Students: 15,298 (2025–2026)
- Teachers: 1,290.72 (on an FTE basis) (2025–2026)
- Staff: 914.44 (on an FTE basis) (2025–2026)
- Student–teacher ratio: 11.85 (2025–2026)

Other information
- Website: sd54.org

Schaumburg Community Consolidated School District 54 operates 21 elementary schools, five junior high schools, and one combined K-8 school based in Schaumburg, Cook County, Illinois, US, a suburb of Chicago.

It serves Schaumburg and portions of Hoffman Estates, Hanover Park, Elk Grove Village and Roselle. In 2010 it had 14,218 students.

The district has 1,420 teachers (FTEs) serving 15,647 students.

As of 2021 it is the largest elementary school district in Illinois.

== Curriculum ==
In 2001, the district began a dual-language Japanese-English program, the only such program in the state's public schools, using immersion and having both languages used each day, with portions taught by native speakers of their respective languages. The Japanese Chamber of Commerce and Industry of Chicago and Omron fund the program. In 2010, there were 183 students in the elementary level and 22 students at the middle school level. The district did not alter the program during budget cuts for the 2010–2011 school year. In 2010 the first graduates of the program graduated, numbering 11.

== Schools ==
School Facts
School name	City	Students	FTE Teachers	Pupil/Teacher Ratio	Low grade	High grade
Adlai Stevenson Elementary School	Elk Grove Village	466	31	15	Prekindergarten	6th grade
Adolph Link Elementary School	Elk Grove Village	482	30	16.1	Kindergarten	6th grade
Albert Einstein Elementary School	Hanover Park	564	34	16.6	Prekindergarten	6th grade
Anne Fox Elementary School	Hanover Park	449	30	15	Kindergarten	6th grade
Francis Campanelli Elementary School	Schaumburg	558	28	19.9	Kindergarten	6th grade
Edwin Aldrin Elementary School	Schaumburg	660	36.5	18.1	Prekindergarten	6th grade
Eisenhower Junior High School	Hoffman Estates	741	49	15.1	7th grade	8th grade
Elizabeth Blackwell Elementary School	Schaumburg	411	25	16.4	Kindergarten	6th grade
Enders-Salk Elementary School	Schaumburg	508	31	16.4	Kindergarten	6th grade
Everett Dirksen Elementary School	Schaumburg	426	25.8	16.5	Kindergarten	6th grade
Fairview Elementary School	Hoffman Estates	526	29	18.1	Kindergarten	6th grade
Fredrick Nerge Elementary School	Roselle	693	37	18.7	Kindergarten	6th grade
Hanover Highlands Elementary School	Hanover Park	430	26.2	16.4	Kindergarten	6th grade
Herbert Hoover Math & Science Academy	Schaumburg	629	40	15.7	Kindergarten	6th grade
Helen Keller Junior High School	Schaumburg	627	47	13.3	7th grade	8th grade
Jane Addams Junior High School	Schaumburg	675	60.4	13.6	7th grade	8th grade
John Muir Literacy Academy	Hoffman Estates	630	37.8	16.7	Kindergarten	6th grade
Lakeview Elementary School	Hoffman Estates	610	36	16.9	Kindergarten	6th grade
Lincoln Prairie School	Hoffman Estates	330	19	17.5	Prekindergarten	8th grade
Douglas MacArthur International Spanish Academy	Hoffman Estates	517	30	17.2	Kindergarten	6th grade
Margaret Mead Junior High School	Elk Grove Village	420	50	16.1	7th grade	8th grade
Michael Collins Elementary School	Schaumburg	767	40	16.7	Kindergarten	6th grade
Nathan Hale Elementary School	Schaumburg	534	35	15.3	Kindergarten	6th grade
Neil Armstrong Elementary School	Hoffman Estates	639	39.5	16.2	Kindergarten	6th grade
Robert Frost Junior High School	Schaumburg	696	48	14.5	7th grade	8th grade
Thomas Dooley Elementary School	Schaumburg	403	22.5	17.9	Kindergarten	6th grade
Winston Churchill Elementary School	Schaumburg	484	24	20.2	Kindergarten	6th grade

Note: Based on 2019–20 school year data
