= Hanover Park station =

Commuter rail station in Hanover Park, Illinois

Hanover Park

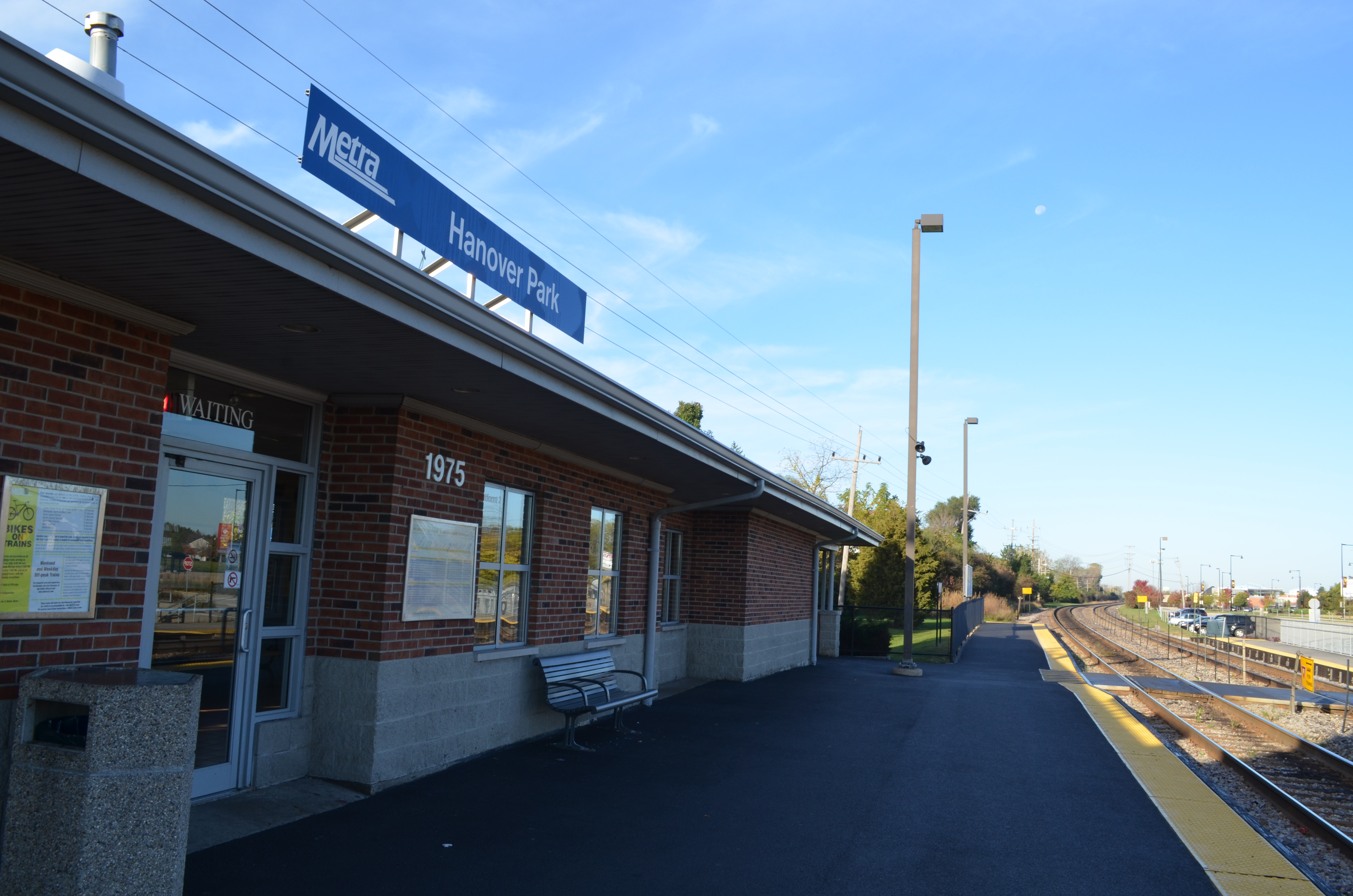
- Hanover Park station in October 2014

General information
- Location: 1975 West Lake Street (US 20), Hanover Park, Illinois 60133
- Coordinates: 41.9880°N 88.1491°W
- Owner: Metra
- Line: Elgin Subdivision
- Platforms: 2 side platforms
- Tracks: 2
- Connections: Pace Buses

Construction
- Parking: Yes
- Accessible: Yes

Other information
- Fare zone: 4

History
- Former names: Ontarioville

Passengers
- 2018: 1,238 (avg. weekday) ▼16.7%
- Rank: 29 out of 236

Services
Preceding station	Metra	Following station
Bartlett toward Big Timber/Elgin	Milwaukee District West	Schaumburg toward Union Station
Former services
Preceding station	Milwaukee Road	Following station
Bartlett toward Elgin	Suburban Service West Line	Roselle toward Chicago
Track layout
Location

Hanover Park is a station on Metra's Milwaukee District West Line in Hanover Park, Illinois, United States. The station is 28.4 miles (45.7 km) away from Chicago Union Station, the eastern terminus of the line. In Metra's zone-based fare system, Hanover Park is in zone 4. As of 2018, Hanover Park is the 29th busiest of Metra's 236 non-downtown stations, with an average of 1,238 weekday boardings.

As of February 15, 2024, Hanover Park is served by 42 trains (20 inbound, 22 outbound) on weekdays, by all 24 trains (12 in each direction) on Saturdays, and by all 18 trains (nine in each direction) on Sundays and holidays.

Parking is available on both sides of the tracks. The largest parking area is on West Lake Street, and the second largest is on Ontarioville Road, both of which are west of County Farm Road. A third smaller parking lot exists on the southeast corner of the County Farm Road bridge on Liberty Street via Barrington Road.

== Bus connections ==
Pace

- "Route 554 – Elgin/Woodfield". PaceBus.com. Chicago: Pace Suburban Bus Service.
