= Bartlett station =

Commuter rail station in Bartlett, Illinois

Bartlett

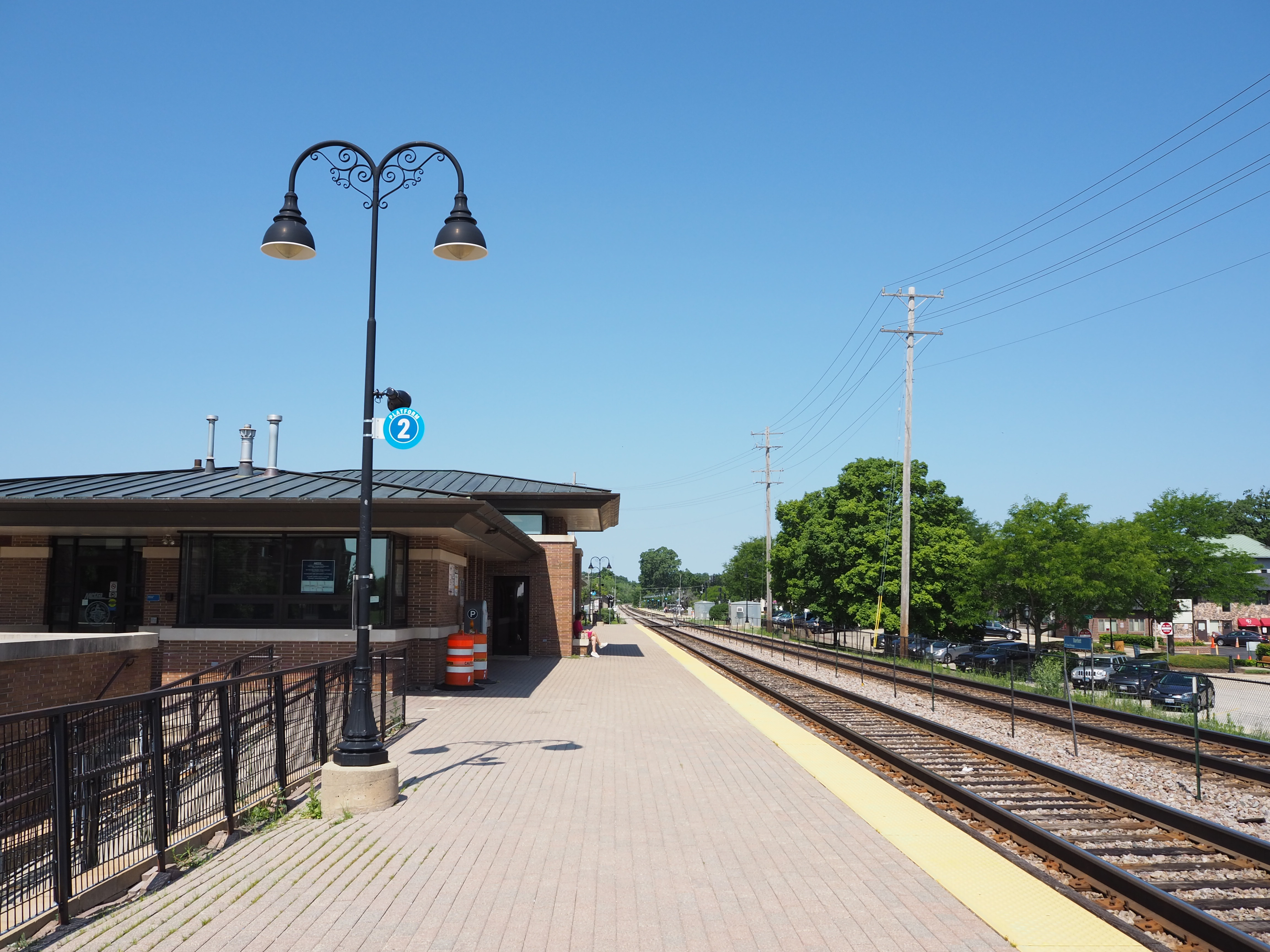
- Bartlett station's inbound platform in July 2023

General information
- Location: Oak Avenue and Railroad Avenue; Bartlett, IL
- Coordinates: 41.9921°N 88.1838°W
- Owner: Metra
- Line: Elgin Subdivision
- Platforms: 2 side platforms
- Tracks: 2

Construction
- Parking: Yes
- Accessible: Yes

Other information
- Fare zone: 4

History
- Opened: 1873
- Rebuilt: 2004–2007

Passengers
- 2018: 988 (average weekday) ▼7.7%
- Rank: 53 out of 236

Services
Preceding station	Metra	Following station
National Street toward Big Timber/Elgin	Milwaukee District West	Hanover Park toward Union Station
Former services
Preceding station	Milwaukee Road	Following station
Spaulding toward Elgin	Suburban Service West Line	Ontarioville toward Chicago
Track layout
Location

Bartlett is a commuter railroad station in Bartlett, Illinois, a western suburb of Chicago. The station is 30.1 miles (48.4 km) away from Chicago Union Station, the eastern terminus of the line. It is served by Metra's Milwaukee District West Line, with service to Union Station in downtown Chicago, and northwest to Elgin. As of 2018, Bartlett is the 53rd busiest of Metra's 236 non-downtown stations, with an average of 988 weekday boardings. Travel time to Union Station ranges from 51 minutes to 1 hour and 11 minutes, with faster times on peak trains.

As of February 15, 2024, Bartlett is served by 42 trains (20 inbound, 22 outbound) on weekdays, by all 24 trains (12 in each direction) on Saturdays, and by all 18 trains (nine in each direction) on Sundays and holidays.

The station is at South Oak Avenue and West Bartlett Avenue in downtown Bartlett.

== History ==
The depot in Bartlett was built in 1873. It was the last remaining original depot left along what used to be the Chicago, Milwaukee, St. Paul and Pacific Railroad. Bartlett station was rebuilt by Metra between 2004 and opened on December 11, 2007. The original station house has been converted into a local railroad museum.

== Status ==
Eastbound trains stop at the new station, which only has a southern platform. Westbound trains stop across from the old station, which now only has a northern platform. The new station's platform only has one pedestrian crossing on the far west side.

Parking has been expanded with the installation of the new station. However, since the trains do not drop off and pick up in the same spot, commuters generally have a moderate walk one direction or another.
