= Hanover Park, Illinois =

- Village
- Flag

- Location of Hanover Park in Cook and DuPage County, Illinois.
- Coordinates: 41°58′55″N 88°08′28″W
- Country: United States
- State: Illinois
- Counties: Cook, DuPage
- Township: Hanover, Schaumburg, Wayne, Bloomingdale
- Incorporated: 1958

Government
  - Type: Council–manager

Area
  - Total: 6.53 sq mi (16.90 km^{2})
  - Land: 6.42 sq mi (16.63 km^{2})
  - Water: 0.10 sq mi (0.27 km^{2}) 1.56%
- Elevation: 801 ft (244 m)

Population (2020)
  - Total: 37,470
  - Density: 5,834.6/sq mi (2,252.75/km^{2})
- Down 0.80% from 2000

Standard of living (2009-11)
  - Per capita income: $21,587
  - Median home value: $198,100
- Time zone: UTC-6 (CST)
  - Summer (DST): UTC-5 (CDT)
- ZIP code: 60133
- Area code(s): 630 and 331
- FIPS code: 17-32746
- GNIS feature ID: 2398244
- Website: hanoverparkillinois.org

Hanover Park is a village in Cook and DuPage counties in the U.S. state of Illinois. A suburb of Chicago, the population was 37,470 at the 2020 census. Ontarioville is a neighborhood within the village.

== History ==
Ontarioville was initially the name assigned to the village of Hanover Park, a municipality situated on the border of Cook and DuPage Counties. Back in 1836, a stagecoach service transported residents along Lake Trail (also known as Grant Highway and later renamed Lake Street) all the way to Galena. By 1872, the Chicago & Pacific Railroad (later known as the Chicago, Milwaukee & St. Paul) installed railway tracks on land donated by Edwin Bartlett, who contributed over seven acres for the establishment of a depot. Edwin and Luther Bartlett each established stations named "Bartlett" along the Chicago and Pacific Railroad line. Luther's station kept the name Bartlett, but to avoid confusion, Edwin renamed his station "Ontario" in 1873, after a legend that the site was built on an old Indian trail between Lake Ontario and Green Bay, Wisconsin.

A post office was established in Ontarioville in 1873.

Ontarioville was eventually incorporated into the surrounding village of Hanover Park in 1982.

== Geography ==
According to the 2021 census gazetteer files, Hanover Park has a total area of 6.53 square miles (16.91 km^{2}), of which 6.42 square miles (16.63 km^{2}) (or 98.42%) is land and 0.10 square miles (0.26 km^{2}) (or 1.58%) is water.

The Ontarioville neighbourhood lies just south of U.S. Route 20 (Lake Street), at the intersection of County Farm Road and Ontarioville Road. Metra's Hanover Park station is located along the Milwaukee District West Line tracks that immediately parallel Ontarioville Road.

== Demographics ==
Historical population
Census	Pop.	Note	%±
1960	451		—
1970	11,735		2,502.0%
1980	28,719		144.7%
1990	32,895		14.5%
2000	38,278		16.4%
2010	37,973		−0.8%
2020	37,470		−1.3%
U.S. Decennial Census; 2010 2020

=== Racial and ethnic composition ===
Hanover Park village, Illinois – Racial and ethnic composition Note: the US Census treats Hispanic/Latino as an ethnic category. This table excludes Latinos from the racial categories and assigns them to a separate category. Hispanics/Latinos may be of any race.
Race / Ethnicity (NH = Non-Hispanic)	Pop 2000	Pop 2010	Pop 2020	% 2000	% 2010	% 2020
White alone (NH)	20,474	14,423	11,885	53.49%	37.98%	31.72%
Black or African American alone (NH)	2,243	2,509	2,537	5.86%	6.61%	6.77%
Native American or Alaska Native alone (NH)	61	62	59	0.16%	0.16%	0.16%
Asian alone (NH)	4,520	5,711	6,326	11.81%	15.04%	16.88%
Pacific Islander alone (NH)	5	5	20	0.01%	0.01%	0.05%
Other race alone (NH)	54	61	158	0.14%	0.16%	0.42%
Mixed race or Multiracial (NH)	688	670	924	1.80%	1.76%	2.47%
Hispanic or Latino (any race)	10,233	14,532	15,561	26.73%	38.27%	41.53%
Total	38,278	37,973	37,470	100.00%	100.00%	100.00%

=== 2020 census ===
As of the 2020 census, Hanover Park had a population of 37,470. There were 11,398 households and 9,177 families residing in the village. The population density was 5,742.53 inhabitants per square mile (2,217.20/km^{2}), and there were 11,732 housing units at an average density of 1,798.01 per square mile (694.22/km^{2}).

The racial makeup of the village was 37.14% White, 7.10% African American, 1.64% Native American, 17.02% Asian, 0.06% Pacific Islander, 21.38% from other races, and 15.67% from two or more races.

The median age was 35.0 years. 25.4% of residents were under the age of 18 and 10.6% of residents were 65 years of age or older. For every 100 females there were 100.6 males, and for every 100 females age 18 and over there were 98.9 males age 18 and over.

100.0% of residents lived in urban areas, while 0.0% lived in rural areas.

Of the 11,398 households, 43.3% had children under the age of 18 living in them. Of all households, 57.4% were married-couple households, 14.8% were households with a male householder and no spouse or partner present, and 21.1% were households with a female householder and no spouse or partner present. About 15.0% of all households were made up of individuals, and 5.2% had someone living alone who was 65 years of age or older. The average household size was 3.71 and the average family size was 3.42.

Of the 11,732 housing units, 2.8% were vacant. The homeowner vacancy rate was 1.0% and the rental vacancy rate was 4.1%.

=== Income and poverty ===
The median income for a household in the village was $77,367, and the median income for a family was $80,815. Males had a median income of $43,375 versus $31,368 for females. The per capita income for the village was $26,823. About 11.4% of families and 12.8% of the population were below the poverty line, including 18.6% of those under age 18 and 10.4% of those age 65 or over.

== Education ==
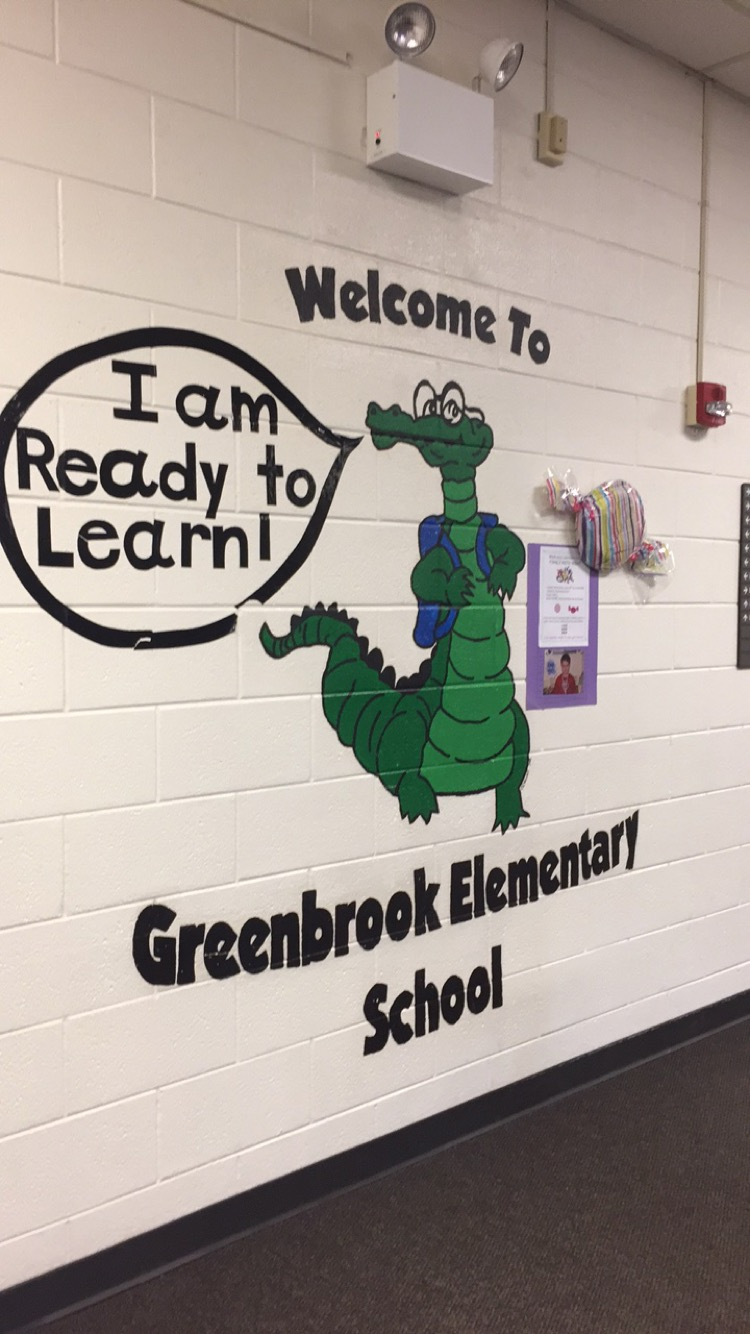
District 20 Greenbrook Elementary School mascot

The town is served by several school districts. One is Elgin Area School District U46, a Unit School District. It serves an area of some 90 square miles (230 km^{2}) in Cook, DuPage and Kane Counties. Almost 40,000 children of school age are in its area. U-46 is the second largest in Illinois behind Chicago Public Schools. Other school districts serving Hanover Park include Schaumburg Township Elementary School District 54, Township High School District 211, Community Consolidated School District 93, Glenbard Township High School District 87, Keeneyville School District 20 and Lake Park High School District 108. A total of six different public high schools serve the village.

- Streamwood High School
- Bartlett High School
- Schaumburg High School
- Hoffman Estates High School
- Lake Park High School
- Glenbard North High School

== Transportation ==
Hanover Park has a station on Metra's Milwaukee District West Line, which provides daily rail service between Elgin, Illinois and Chicago, Illinois (at Union Station). In Metra's zone-based fare system, Hanover Park is in zone 4.

Pace provides bus service on Route 554 connecting Hanover Park to Elgin, Schaumburg, and other destinations.

== Notable residents ==
- Jeffrey and Jill Erickson, bank robber couple
- Jon Walker, bassist from American pop punk pop band Panic! At The Disco and lead guitarist (and occasionally the lead singer) of The Young Veins

== Parks and libraries ==
The Hanover Park Park District is a general park district established by the voters of Hanover Park in 1964. The park district is responsible for the maintenance, operation and administration of parks and park facilities and is governed by five commissioners elected at large for overlapping, four-year terms.

Schaumburg Park District 128 acres (0.52 km^{2}).

- Poplar Creek Public Library District
- Schaumburg Township District Library - serves area of Hanover Park in Schaumburg Township (Cook County - east of Barrington Rd and north of Barrington and Lake St.)
- Hanover Park Park District

== Sister cities ==
- Valparaíso, Mexico
