= Alfred Campanelli =

American housing mogul in the 1960s

- Campanelli in 1950
- Born: July 9, 1924 (Note: Campanelli's year of birth provided here, 1924, is per his draft registration card of December 1942 and records of the Social Security Administration. His obituary noted his age at death as 78, but gave a birth year of 1925.); Brockton, Massachusetts, U.S.
- Died: April 9, 2003 (aged 78); Fort Lauderdale, Florida, U.S.
- Resting place: Blue Hill Cemetery; Braintree, Massachusetts
- Occupation: Housing developer
- Years active: c. 1947–1998
- Known for: Housing development in Schaumburg, Illinois, U.S.

Alfred Campanelli (July 9, 1924 – April 9, 2003) was an American housing mogul who was responsible for much of the early suburban-style housing in Schaumburg, a suburb of Chicago, Illinois.

== Biography ==
Campanelli was born in Brockton, Massachusetts, the son of Franscesco (or Francis) and Lisa Campanelli. The father was an Italian cobbler and emigrated to the United States in the early 1900s and settled in Brockton. The couple had four sons and a daughter.

Alfred Campanelli, his three brothers, and their brother-in-law formed the Campanelli Companies in 1947. A style of ranch house the brothers made popular became known as the "Campanelli Ranch". By 1956, the company was building 1,000 houses per year. In 1959, the company began construction of the first large residential subdivision in Schaumburg, Illinois, The company constructed approximately 6,000 houses there. Overall, the company built approximately 30,000 houses, half in New England.

Campanelli School in Schaumburg, which opened in 1961, was named in memory of Francis Campanelli. It sits on the first of numerous land sites donated by the construction company, expressly for the purpose of building schools. Campanelli School was the one building also paid for by the construction company and donated to the school district.

Campanelli served in the United States Navy during World War II. He retired from housing work in 1998. Campanelli died on April 9, 2003, at his home in Fort Lauderdale, Florida.

Campanelli was a strong philanthropist, and gave much back to the community. A YMCA in Schaumburg was named in his honor, following a donation of $3.65 million. He also donated $2 million to his hometown of Brockton, which was used to help fund the construction of Campanelli Stadium.
