= Elk Grove Village, Illinois =

Village in Illinois, United States

- Village
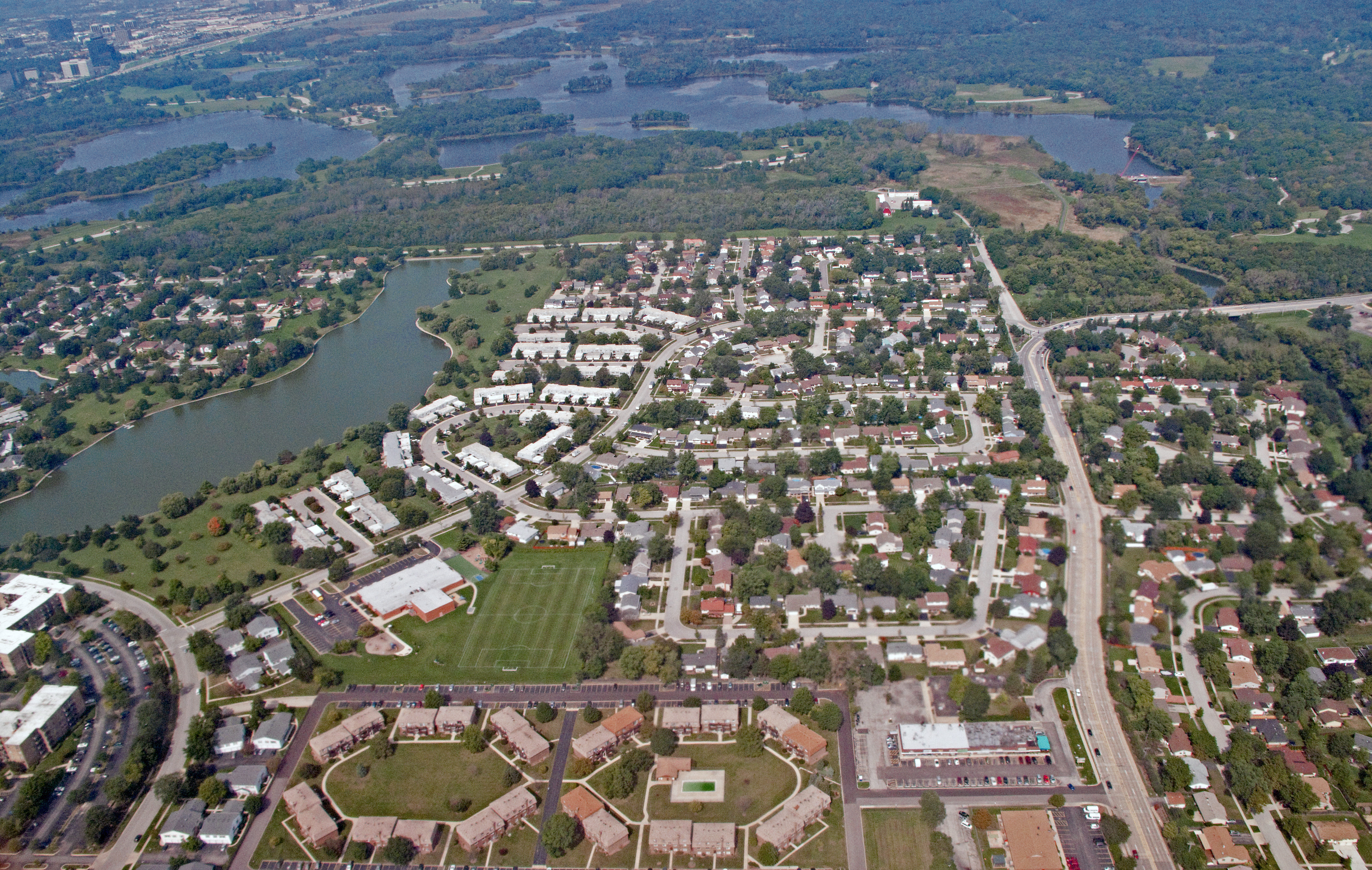
- Aerial view of Elk Grove Village and Busse Woods

- Flag Seal
- Motto: "The Exceptional Community"
- Interactive location map of Elk Grove Village
- Coordinates: 42.005271°N 87.992348°W
- Country: United States
- State: Illinois
- Counties: Cook, DuPage
- Townships: Elk Grove, Schaumburg, Addison
- Settled: 1834
- Established: 1848
- Incorporated: July 17, 1956

Government
  - Type: Council–Manager
  - Mayor: Craig B. Johnson
  - Trustee–Village: Joseph D. Bush; Jeffrey C. Franke; Kathryn A. Jarosch; Keith Lasken; Tammy K. Miller; Stephen F. Schmidt

Area
  - Total: 11.838 sq mi (30.660 km^{2})
  - Land: 11.781 sq mi (30.512 km^{2})
  - Water: 0.058 sq mi (0.149 km^{2}) 0.48%
- Elevation: 686 ft (209 m)

Population (2020)
  - Total: 32,812
  - Estimate (2024): 31,802
  - Density: 2,785.2/sq mi (1,075.4/km^{2})
- Time zone: UTC–6 (Central (CST))
  - Summer (DST): UTC–5 (CDT)
- ZIP Codes: 60007, 60009
- Area codes: 847, 224, 630, and 331
- FIPS code: 17-23256
- GNIS feature ID: 2398803
- Website: elkgrove.org

Elk Grove Village is a village in Cook and DuPage Counties, Illinois, United States. The population was 32,812 at the 2020 census, and was estimated at 31,802 in 2024. Located 22 miles (35 km) northwest of Chicago along the Golden Corridor, the Village of Elk Grove Village was incorporated on July 17, 1956. It is directly adjacent to O'Hare International Airport and is economically important to the Chicago metropolitan area due to its large industrial park, located on the eastern border of the village. The community is served by several Interstate highways including I-90, I-290/I-355/Route 53, and IL-390. Elk Grove is also expected to be served by the I-490 Western O'Hare Bypass upon completion of the project.

== History ==
=== Pre-colonial and colonial eras ===
The land that is now the Village of Elk Grove was controlled by the Miami Confederacy (which contained the Illini and Kickapoo tribes) starting in the early 1680s. The Confederacy was driven from the area by the Iroquois and Meskwaki in the early 1700s.

The French-allied Potawatomi began to raid and take possession of Northern Illinois in the 1700s. In the late 1700s and early 1800s, the Potawatomi expanded southwards from their territory in Green Bay and westward from their holdings near Detroit, until they controlled in an L-shaped swath of territory from Green Bay to the Illinois River, and from the Mississippi River to the Maumee River.

In 1833, the Potawatomi signed the 1833 Treaty of Chicago with the United States Government. As a result of the Treaty, the United States was granted control of all land west of Lake Michigan and east of Lake Winnebago in exchange for a tract of land west of the Mississippi. The land that is now Elk Grove was ceded to the U.S. in this treaty, which sparked mass white immigration to the Northern Illinois area. The U.S. Government purchased the land for about 15 cents per acre and then resold it to white settlers for 1.25 dollars per acre.

Aaron Miner, a revolutionary war veteran, moved to what is now in Elk Grove in 1833. He maintained friendly relations with the remaining Potawatomi, who gave him a firebrand. His wife and daughter often baked cookies which they would trade with the Potawatomi for venison and game.

=== Incorporation and planned community ===
The village was formally incorporated in 1956 in Elk Grove Township and was founded as a planned suburban community. The majority of houses were constructed by Centex Corporation. As part of the original planning concept, the village was to be home to separated residential and industrial areas (the latter of which would later become the largest industrial park in the United States). Today, it ranks as the second-highest scoring American industrial park, according to Benchmarkia.

Prior to its development as a residential community, it was home to many farmers and their families (mostly German immigrants). Many of the major streets in and around the village are named for these farmers. Busse Farm was the final undeveloped agricultural property in the village, located between Higgins Road and Oakton Street, and was at one time considered as a location for a new Chicago Bears stadium, to replace the aging Soldier Field. In 2018 the land was sold to be developed into the Elk Grove Technology Park.

The original boundaries of Elk Grove Village's residential area were Higgins Road (Illinois Route 72) on the north, State Road (now Arlington Heights Road) on the west, Landmeier Road on the south, and Wildwood Road on the east. The village easily doubled in size during the 1960s. By the end of the decade, most of the land between O'Hare Airport and I-290/IL-53 was developed. As the village expanded to the south and west, new roads, schools, and parks were added to the community. Rupley Elementary was the first school to be constructed in Elk Grove Village. It was named after Ira Rupley, an executive vice president at Centex who helped lead the early development of the village.

In the 1970s, the village developed land west of the expressway in Schaumburg Township along with industrial development into Addison Township. New apartment communities were constructed in Elk Grove Village along Tonne Road and Ridge Avenue. These developments have since been sectioned, and some converted to condominium homes. The village saw continuous residential, commercial, and industrial growth during the 1980s. However, Lively Junior High School was no longer necessary and saw fast-declining enrollment numbers. It was shut down by the school district, leased to Elk Grove Park District, and remodeled to become the Jack E. Claes Pavilion Recreation Facility. School District 59 built administrative offices at the site.

In 1982, Elk Grove Village was briefly in the national spotlight with one of the first reported deaths in the Chicago Tylenol murders case with the death of 12-year-old Mary Kellerman, who died after taking a Tylenol capsule that was laced with potassium cyanide. The case led to the development of more stringent FDA regulations around tamper-evident technology.

In the 1990s and 2000s, the village embarked on a series of beautification and redevelopment programs which included the installation of a clock tower at Village Hall, installation of brick-paved crosswalks in residential areas, new landscaping in boulevards and other public lands, and installation of retro-themed street lights.

In 2006, Elk Grove Village became one of the first municipalities in Illinois to enact a public smoking ban, and in 2008 became one of the first Chicago suburbs to use red light cameras. In June 2010, Elk Grove Village's Municipal Administration and Public Safety Complex was LEED Gold Certified by the U.S. Green Building Council.

== Geography ==
According to the United States Census Bureau, the village has a total area of 11.838 square miles (30.66 km^{2}), of which 11.781 square miles (30.51 km^{2}) is land and 0.057 square miles (0.15 km^{2}) (0.48%) is water.

== Demographics ==
Historical population
Census	Pop.	Note	%±
1960	6,608		—
1970	20,346		207.9%
1980	28,679		41.0%
1990	33,429		16.6%
2000	34,727		3.9%
2010	33,127		−4.6%
2020	32,812		−1.0%
2024 (est.)	31,802	▼	−3.1%
U.S. Decennial Census; 2020 Census

=== Racial and ethnic composition ===
Elk Grove Village, Illinois – racial and ethnic composition Note: the US Census treats Hispanic/Latino as an ethnic category. This table excludes Latinos from the racial categories and assigns them to a separate category. Hispanics/Latinos may be of any race.
Race / ethnicity (NH = non-Hispanic)	Pop. 1980	Pop. 1990	Pop. 2000	Pop. 2010	Pop. 2020
White alone (NH)	26,710 (93.13%)	29,692 (88.82%)	28,599 (82.35%)	25,671 (77.49%)	23,320 (71.07%)
Black or African American alone (NH)	189 (0.66%)	261 (0.78%)	481 (1.39%)	449 (1.36%)	599 (1.83%)
Native American or Alaska Native alone (NH)	21 (0.07%)	32 (0.10%)	24 (0.07%)	44 (0.13%)	39 (0.12%)
Asian alone (NH)	1,328 (4.63%)	2,245(6.72%)	3,034 (8.74%)	3,327 (10.04%)	3,919 (11.94%)
Pacific Islander alone (NH)	—	—	15 (0.04%)	4 (0.01%)	4 (0.01%)
Other race alone (NH)	6 (0.02%)	7 (0.02%)	39 (0.11%)	23 (0.07%)	80 (0.24%)
Mixed race or multiracial (NH)	—	—	370 (1.07%)	460 (1.39%)	862 (2.63%)
Hispanic or Latino (any race)	653 (2.28%)	1,192 (3.57%)	2,165 (6.23%)	3,149 (9.51%)	3,989 (12.16%)
Total	28,679 (100.00%)	33,429 (100.00%)	34,727 (100.00%)	33,127 (100.00%)	32,812 (100.00%)

=== 2020 census ===
As of the 2020 census, Elk Grove Village had a population of 32,812, with 13,527 households and 8,924 families residing in the village. The population density was 2,819.14 inhabitants per square mile (1,088.5/km^{2}), and there were 13,945 housing units at an average density of 1,198.13 per square mile (462.6/km^{2}).

The median age was 44.8 years. 18.1% of residents were under the age of 18 and 20.2% were 65 years of age or older. For every 100 females, there were 92.7 males, and for every 100 females age 18 and over, there were 90.8 males age 18 and over. 100.0% of residents lived in urban areas, while 0.0% lived in rural areas.

The racial makeup of the village was 73.3% White, 1.9% Black or African American, 0.5% American Indian and Alaska Native, 12.0% Asian, 0.0% Native Hawaiian and Other Pacific Islander, 4.9% from some other race, and 7.3% from two or more races. Hispanic or Latino people of any race were 12.2% of the population.

Of all households, 26.1% had children under the age of 18 living in them, 51.6% were married-couple households, 16.1% were households with a male householder and no spouse or partner present, and 27.3% were households with a female householder and no spouse or partner present. About 29.4% of all households were made up of individuals, and 14.2% had someone living alone who was 65 years of age or older. The average household size was 3.09 and the average family size was 2.51.

Of all housing units, 3.0% were vacant. The homeowner vacancy rate was 1.0% and the rental vacancy rate was 3.9%.

=== 2024 estimate ===
As of the 2024 estimate, there were 31,802 people, 12,786 households, and _ families residing in the village. The population density was 2,699.43 inhabitants per square mile (1,042.3/km^{2}). There were 13,428 housing units at an average density of 1,139.80 per square mile (440.1/km^{2}). The racial makeup of the village was 72.3% White (69.0% NH White), 3.0% African American, 0.3% Native American, 11.8% Asian, 0.0% Pacific Islander, _% from some other races and 8.7% from two or more races. Hispanic or Latino people of any race were 14.6% of the population.

=== Demographic estimates ===
According to realtor website Zillow, the average price of a home as of December 31, 2025, in Elk Grove Village is $369,305.

As of the 2023 American Community Survey, there are 12,786 estimated households in Elk Grove Village with an average of 2.49 persons per household. The village has a median household income of $95,216. Approximately 6.9% of the village's population lives at or below the poverty line. Elk Grove Village has an estimated 64.9% employment rate, with 40.9% of the population holding a bachelor's degree or higher and 92.5% holding a high school diploma. There were 13,428 housing units at an average density of 1,139.80 per square mile (440.1/km^{2}).

The top five reported languages (people were allowed to report up to two languages, thus the figures will generally add to more than 100%) were English (66.8%), Spanish (10.5%), Indo-European (15.4%), Asian and Pacific Islander (6.2%), and Other (1.0%).

The median age in the village was 43.9 years.

=== Income and poverty ===
The median income for a household in the village was $85,240, and the median income for a family was $105,398. Males had a median income of $62,607 versus $44,059 for females. The per capita income for the village was $41,703. About 3.0% of families and 4.0% of the population were below the poverty line, including 6.0% of those under age 18 and 3.3% of those age 65 or over.

=== Religion ===
The Lutheran Church of the Holy Spirit in Elk Grove Village remains the only church plant still in existence which was planted and pastored by the Rev. Dr. Martin E. Marty. Though Marty became a founding influence in the Evangelical Lutheran Church in America, because the church was planted within the Lutheran Church – Missouri Synod, it remains a member church of the Lutheran Church – Missouri Synod. Another prominent Pastor there was the Bishop Roger Pittelko of the English District of the Lutheran Church – Missouri Synod.

The Roman Catholic Archdiocese of Chicago operates the area's Catholic churches. On July 1, 2020, St. Julian Eymard Parish and Queen of the Rosary Parish will merge, with the latter having both the combined church and the school.

== Economy ==
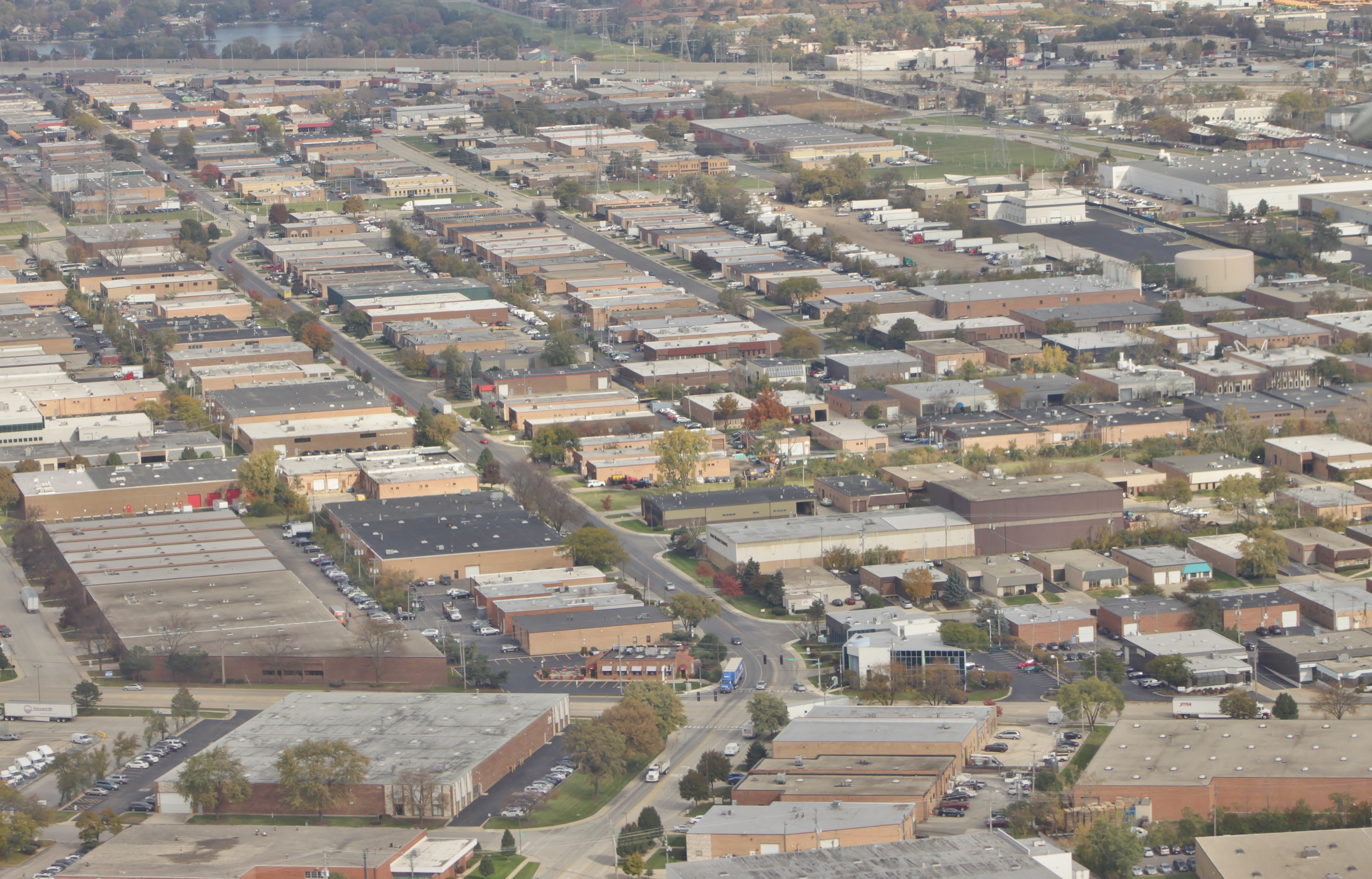
Aerial view of the Elk Grove Village industrial area

Elk Grove Village is home to the largest consolidated business park in North America. There are nearly 3,600 businesses operating in the Village's 5.9-square-mile (15 km^{2}) business park along the western edge of O'Hare International Airport, employing nearly 100,000 persons. In 2018, the business park became the title sponsor of the Bahamas Bowl college football bowl game, making it officially the Makers Wanted Bahamas Bowl after the business park's advertising slogan, "Makers Wanted".

The Elk Grove business park is home to the largest concentration of manufacturers in the Midwest; the largest concentration of logistic freight companies in the United States, and the second-largest source of manufacturing in Illinois behind only the City of Chicago. The village is home to many large data centers which rely upon the convergence of national fiber optic networks and natural gas lines in Elk Grove, which has other strategic advantages for business including the convergence of national fiber optic cables, national gasoline and oil pipelines, and a virtually unlimited supply of fresh water from Lake Michigan.

Elk Grove Village is home to Alexian Brothers Medical Center (ABMC) hospital, which is the largest employer in the community with over 2,200 workers. There are a number of other well-known corporations including Apple Vacations, the American Academy of Pediatrics, Illinois Tool Works (ITW), ADP, CitiGroup, Symons, and Pepsi Cola Distribution.

On December 30, 2014, Global Trade Magazine named Elk Grove Village one of America's best cities for global trade.

=== Top employers ===
According to the village's 2022 Annual Comprehensive Financial Report, the top employers in the village are:

#	Employer	# of Employees
1	Alexian Brothers Medical Center	2,800
2	ADP	1,612
3	Ecolab	900
4	Seko Logistics	687
5	Marketplace Brands, LLC	418
6	SigmaTron International	400
7	Village of Elk Grove Village	333
8	Unilode	314

== Arts and culture ==
As the name suggests, Elk Grove Village is home to a small herd of elk kept in a grove at the eastern edge of the Busse Woods forest preserve for which the grove is named. Elk were originally native to the area (and most of the Eastern United States) but had been extirpated by the early 1800s. The tradition of the Elk Grove herd began when elk were brought by train from Montana by an early resident, William Busse, in the 1920s. The elk are currently maintained by the Chicago Zoological Society veterinary staff and the Busse Woods Forest Preserve wildlife biologists.

In July 2018, the village, as part of its "Makers Wanted" campaign announced that they would be taking over its naming rights sponsorship of the Bahamas Bowl beginning with its 2018 edition of the bowl.

== Education ==
Areas east of I-290 are served by Elk Grove High School (which is a part of Illinois High School District 214) and Community Consolidated School District 59. Areas west of I-290 are served by James B. Conant High School which is part of Township High School District 211 and Mead Junior High which is part of Community Consolidated School District 54. Queen of the Rosary Catholic School is located in Elk Grove Village and was named by Chicago magazine in 2014 as one of the top 25 private elementary schools in the Chicago area.

Advance learning is offered by Gifted and Magnet programs

== Media ==
The area metropolitan newspapers are the Chicago Tribune and the Chicago Sun-Times. Elk Grove Village is also served by the Daily Herald and Journal & Topics Media Group, publishers of the weekly Elk Grove Journal and the monthly Elk Grove Business Journal.

== Transportation ==
Pace provides bus service on Route 223 connecting Elk Grove Village to the Rosemont 'L' station and other destinations.

== Notable people ==
- Robert L. Baird, jockey
- Jessica Calalang, figure skater, 2020 U.S. Figure Skating Championships
- Billy Corgan, lead singer and guitarist for rock band Smashing Pumpkins
- Dave Cullen, author
- Dylan Dodd, MLB pitcher
- Stephanie Faracy, actress
- Sarah Gorden, soccer player
- Kelli Hubly, current National Women's Soccer League player with Bay FC
- James Iha, Guitarist for Smashing Pumpkins, and A Perfect Circle
- Steven Kazmierczak, perpetrator of the Northern Illinois University shooting
- Jerry B. Jenkins, co-author of the Left Behind series
- Bill Kelly, screenwriter; born and raised in Elk Grove Village
- Irene Kotowicz, former All-American Girls Professional Baseball League player
- John Kotz, basketball player on Wisconsin's 1941 NCAA championship team
- John Loprieno, actor (One Life to Live)
- John McDonough, former president of the Chicago Blackhawks and the Chicago Cubs
- Katie Naughton, current National Women's Soccer League player with the Chicago Red Stars
- Dave Otto, former Major League Baseball player and Chicago Cubs and ESPN broadcast analyst
- Ailyn Pérez, American operatic soprano and the winner of the 2012 Richard Tucker Award
- Erin Walter, former USL W-League player
- Ryan Loutos, current Major League Baseball pitcher for the Seattle Mariners

== Sister cities ==
- Termini Imerese, Sicily, Italy
