= Hoffman Estates High School =

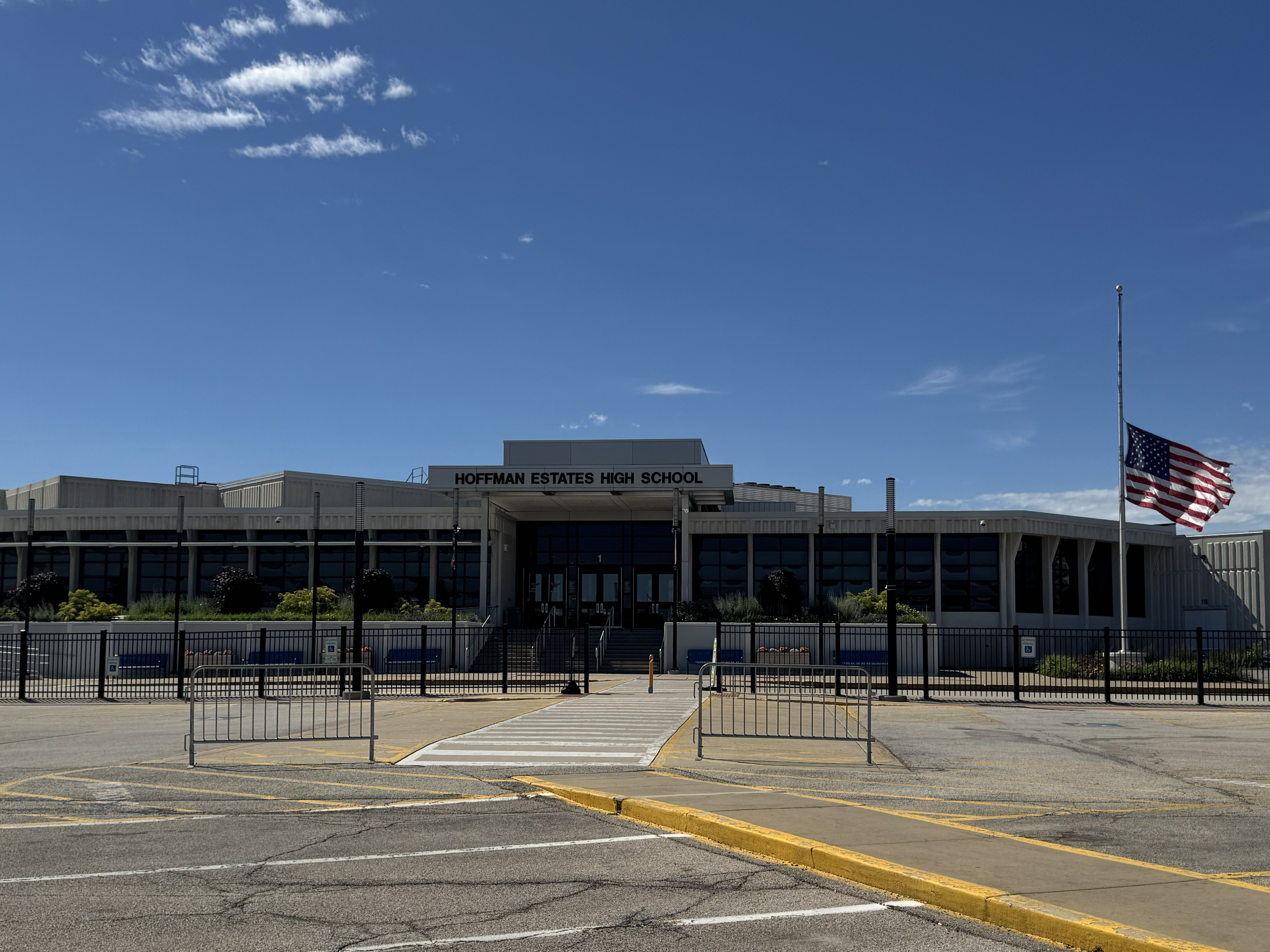

Location
- 1100 W. Higgins Rd. Hoffman Estates, Illinois 60169; United States; 42.0539°N 88.1067°W

Information
- School type: public secondary
- Opened: 1973
- School district: Township High School District 211
- Superintendent: Judith Campbell
- Principal: Michael Alther
- Teaching staff: 156.22 (FTE)
- Grades: 9–12
- Gender: co-ed
- Enrollment: 2,185 (2024-2025)
- Average class size: 21.5
- Student to teacher ratio: 13.99
- Campus: Suburban
- Colours: Royal blue and burnt orange
- Athletics conference: Mid-Suburban Conference
- Mascot: Hercules the Hawk
- Nickname: Hawks
- Newspaper: Hawkeye View
- Yearbook: Halcyon
- Website: https://hehs.d211.org/

Hoffman Estates High School (HEHS) is a public four-year high school located in Hoffman Estates, Illinois, a northwest suburb of Chicago, in the United States. It is part of Township High School District 211, which also includes James B. Conant High School, William Fremd High School, Palatine High School, and Schaumburg High School.

As of September 2025, Hoffman Estates High School is the most diverse non-charter, non-magnet public high school in Illinois, and the twenty-seventh most diverse in the United States.

== History ==
Hoffman Estates High School, built to house an enrollment of 2500 students, opened in the fall of 1973 as a freshman-sophomore school. The first senior class graduated in 1976. Hoffman Estates High School serves sections of Hoffman Estates, Schaumburg, Hanover Park, and Streamwood.

Former principal Terri Busch received the 2002–2003 Illinois State Board of Education’s Award of Excellence as a school administrator for outstanding contributions to Illinois education.

Hoffman Estates High School's held a German Exchange with its sister school, Bertolt Brecht Gymnasium in Munich, Germany, for 26 uninterrupted years. A new exchange with Melanchthon Gymnasium Nürnberg began in 2008, replacing the Bertolt Brecht exchange.

In March 2000, Hoffman Estates High School sent the first Special Olympic Unified Floor Hockey Team in the state to Anchorage, Alaska. In July 2003, a Hoffman Estates Special Olympic athlete represented Illinois and the United States in Dublin, Ireland. The volleyball team took first place at World Games. Special Olympics events at Hoffman Estates High School include volleyball, basketball, track, and snowshoeing. Peer coaching is provided by the peer partners. In 2004, the Hawks went to state for track and snowshoeing.

The main corridor was adorned with paintings of Walter Payton on the walls to symbolize the Hall-of-Famer who served as the basketball assistant coach of the team after his retirement from the Bears.

Thomas O. Hillesheim was the first principal of Hoffman Estates High School. He was followed by Dennis Garber. Terri Busch was Hoffman's third principal. James Britton was Hoffman's fourth principal, and was replaced by Joshua Schumacher after Britton's promotion to the district offices. On January 16, 2020, Michael Alther was appointed to be Hoffman Estates High School's sixth principal.

In 2013, a team from the school won the prestigious Argonne National Laboratory's 18th annual Rube Goldberg Machine Contest.

Since 2013, the Business Professionals of America parliamentary procedure teams have consistently taken first and second place at state competition and have ranked in the top 10 in the country at national competition.

The Hoffman Estates High School Booster Club organizes various support activities for the school each year.

== Academics ==
The U.S. Department of Education awarded the Blue Ribbon Award of Excellence in Education to Hoffman Estates in 1985.

In 2008, Hoffman Estates had an average composite ACT score of 21.3, and graduated 88% of its senior class. Hoffman Estates has not made Adequate Yearly Progress (AYP) on the Prairie State Achievement Examination, which combined with the ACT are the assessment tools used to fulfill the federal No Child Left Behind Act. The entire school did not meet minimum standards in reading. Three student subgroups failed to meet minimum requirements in reading, and two of those subgroups also failed to meet minimum standards in mathematics.

In the 2024-2025 school year, Hoffman Estates was designated as a Commendable School by the Illinois State Board of Education (ISBE). Hoffman Estates had a 93.5% graduation rate, higher than the Illinois and D211 average of 89% and 93.1%, respectively. Hoffman Estates had a 57% ELA proficiency rate, which was higher than the Illinois rate of 52.4%, but lower than the D211 rate of 62.8%. Hoffman Estates had a 45.7% Math proficiency rate, which was higher than the Illinois rate of 38.4%, but lower than the D211 rate of 56.1%. Hoffman Estates had a 55% Science proficiency rate, which was higher than the Illinois rate of 44.6%, but lower than the D211 rate of 62.6%. All proficiency rates were calculated by combining both the results from the ACT suite and the Dynamic Learning Maps Alternative Assessment (DLM-AA) for students with cognitive disabilities.

== Demographics ==
In the 2022-2023 school year, there were 2,067 students at the school. 36% of students were Hispanic or Latino, 28% were non-Hispanic white, 20% were Asian, 11% were black or African-American, and 5% were multiracial. 49% of students are eligible for free or reduced price lunches, and the school has a student to teacher ratio of 13.

== Athletics ==
Hoffman Estates competes in the Mid-Suburban Conference West Division. The school is also a member of the Illinois High School Association (IHSA), which governs most interscholastic athletics and competitive activities in the state. Their teams are stylized as the Hawks.

The school sponsors interscholastic teams for young men and women in basketball, cross country, golf, gymnastics, soccer, swimming & diving, tennis, track and field athletics, volleyball, cheerleading and water polo. Young men may also compete in baseball, football, and wrestling, while young women may also compete in badminton, bowling, and softball. The Hoffman Estates Basketball team gained much attention due to the fact the Hall-of-Fame Football Player, Walter Payton, served as the assistant coach for the team during his last years. While not governed by the IHSA, the school also sponsors teams for young men and women in lacrosse.

Lacrosse was the most recent sport to be added at HEHS, added in the spring of 2017 as part of an expansion program.

The following athletic teams placed in the top four of their respective IHSA sponsored state tournaments or meets:

- Basketball (girls): fourth place (1990–1991)
- Bowling (girls): fourth place (2007–2008); second place (2004–205); State Champions (2005–2006), third place (2013-2014), second place (2017–18)
- Cross Country (boys): second place (1990–191)
- Cross Country (girls): fourth place (1986–1987); State Champions (1987–1988)
- Soccer (boys): second place (1985–1986)
- Soccer (girls): third place (1989–1990)
- Track & Field (boys): second place (1996–1997)
- Track & Field (girls): third place (2010-2011)

== Activities ==
The Hawkeye View has consistently been rated with excellent marks in regional and national press contests. Recently, Hoffman Estates High School's newspaper has earned first place ratings from the American Scholastic Press Association (ASPA), the National Scholastic Press Association (NSPA), and the Kettle Moraine Press Association (KEMPA), as well as a Silver Certificate for Excellence in Journalism from the Northern Illinois Scholastic Press Association (NISPA). The student-run, student-produced newspaper has also received the Medalist rating, Columbia Scholastic Press Association's (CSPA) highest award.

The Forensics team, also known as Competitive Performing Arts team, regularly sends speech and acting competitors to the state tournament.

The Skyhawks Flag Squad has qualified for IDTA State competition for 21 consecutive years. They have earned first place in state seven times, including 2004.

The Madrigal Singers have performed each of the past 26 years at Stronghold Castle for in Oregon, Illinois, for 6,000 to 7,000 guests every year. They have also held Madrigal Dinners at the high school since 1974.

In 2004, the WYSE academic challenge team placed no citation overall at the state meet held at the University of Illinois. Fourteen students teamed up to take tests in math, English, chemistry, physics, biology, computers, and engineering graphics. Several students earned individual medals for placing first through sixth in the state.

For the past 11 years, members of the Math Team have qualified for the State mathematics competition. State and Regional awards have been earned by team members. In 2004, the team won the District 211 meet. At the state meet, the junior/senior eight-person team took fourth place, the Pre-Calc team took seventh place, and the freshmen and Calculator teams took tenth place.

In 2004, the Scholastic Bowl Team set a school record for wins, compiling a 45–16 record. In Mid-Suburban League competition, the team tallied 15 wins and 0 losses en route to claiming the conference championship. The team won the IHSA regional championship, and had two players achieve all-sectional honors, with one earning first team all-state.

The Chess Team started in 1998, and has qualified every year to participate in the State Finals in Peoria, IL. The team has had some great finishes in the State Championship over the years: 1999 – sixth place; 2000 – fourth place; 2001 – 14th place (MSL Conference Champs); 2002 – 22nd place; 2003 – 40th place; 2004 – 35th place; 2005 – 19th place; 2006 – 33rd place; 2024 - 38th place; 2025 - 27th place; 2026 - 25th place.

In the 1999–2000 school year, the chess team finished fourth at the IHSA State Tournament.

Beginning in 2012, the HEHS Business Professionals of America have won numerous state and national awards. The parliamentary procedure teams, founded by Carter Trousdale and Shreyas Gandlur in 2013 with the guidance of Dr. Kerri Largo, won first and second place at state competition in 2015, second and third in 2016, first and second in 2017, and first and second in 2018. Nationally, the teams have ranked in the top 10 since 2013. While also getting top 5 finishes during Nationals in 2022, 2023, and 2024

In March 2022, the Special Olympics basketball team won the IHSA Unified State Basketball Championship.

== Notable alumni ==
- Sal Fasano – former MLB catcher (1996–2002, 2005–2008)
- Kyung Lah – television news correspondent for CNN
- Al Levine – MLB relief pitcher (1996–2005)
- John Porcellino (class of 1986) – zine maker known for King-Cat Comics and Stories (1989–present)
- Eric Saubert – NFL tight end for the Seattle Seahawks
- Sherri Shepherd – actress, comedian, former co-host of The View (2007–2014), host of Sherri (2022–2026)
- Ken Snow – former NCAA soccer player for Indiana University and two-time Hermann Trophy winner
- Steve Snow – member of the U.S. 1988 Summer Olympics soccer team
- Todd Stashwick – The Second City alum and actor known for The Riches (2007–2008) and 12 Monkeys (2015–2018)
- Robert Steinmiller – actor known for films Bingo (1991) and Jack the Bear (1993)
