= Schaumburg High School =

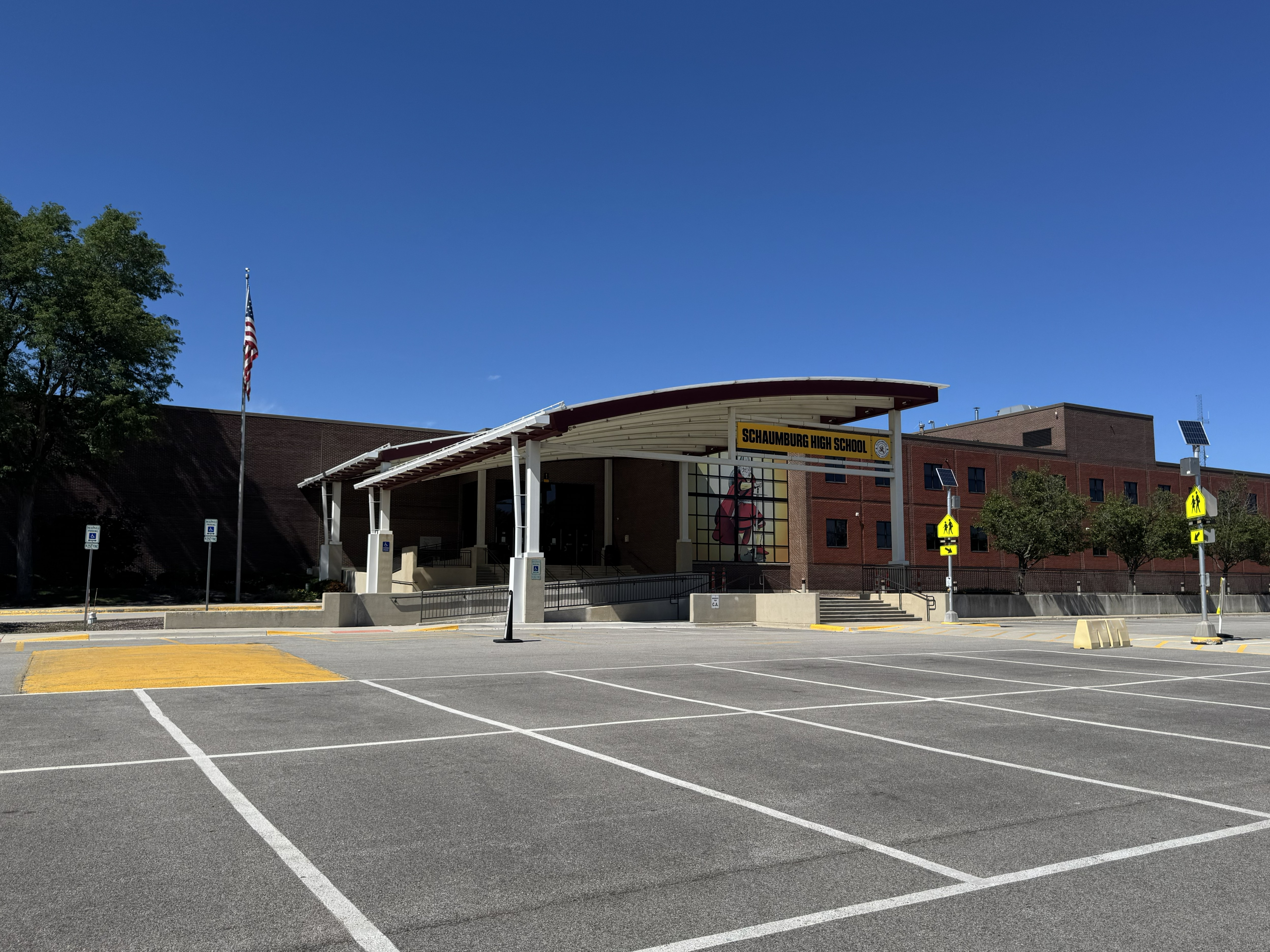

Location
- 1100 W. Schaumburg Rd. Schaumburg, Illinois 60194; United States; 42.0283°N 88.10722°W

Information
- School type: Public secondary
- Opened: September 17, 1970
- School district: Twp. H.S. District 211
- Superintendent: Judith Campbell
- Principal: Thomas Mocon
- Teaching staff: 151.34 (on an FTE basis)
- Grades: 9–12
- Gender: Coed
- Enrollment: 2,416 (2024-2025)
- Average class size: 30
- Student to teacher ratio: 15.96
- Campus: Suburban
- Colors: Cardinal red gold
- Slogan: "We are SHS"
- Fight song: Saxon Victory Song
- Athletics conference: Mid-Suburban League
- Mascot: Siegie Saxon
- Nickname: Saxons
- Publication: Variations
- Newspaper: Saxon Scribe
- Yearbook: Shimmer
- Website: https://shs.d211.org/

Schaumburg High School, also known as SHS, is a public four-year high school located in Schaumburg, Illinois, a northwest suburb of Chicago, United States. The school is part of Township High School District 211, which also includes William Fremd High School, Hoffman Estates High School, Palatine High School, and James B. Conant High School.

== History ==
Schaumburg High School opened on September 17, 1970, located 31 miles northwest of downtown Chicago near Woodfield. It is accredited by the North Central Association and has earned full recognition status by the State Superintendent of Schools in the State of Illinois.

SHS serves students who reside in Schaumburg, the south side of Hoffman Estates and northern Hanover Park.

In 1993, the United States Department of Education recognized Schaumburg High School as a Blue Ribbon School of Excellence. In 1996, SHS was recognized by Redbook magazine as one of "America's Best Schools." In 1999, they were one of 96 high schools nationwide recognized as an outstanding high school by U.S. News & World Report.

In late 2008, SHS underwent a massive reconstruction product in which 13 new classrooms, a new grand foyer, busport, administration center, three new science labs, and handicap accessibility were added to the high school. This was a part of the larger District 211 construction projects on Conant, Hoffman Estates, and Schaumburg High schools.

Every two years Schaumburg also donates to the St. Baldrick's Foundation. In 2012, Schaumburg raised over $100,000 giving them second place in the state of Illinois for most money raised. In 2022, they raised $71,497 for St. Baldrick's Foundation and in 2024 raised $75,033.

== Academics ==
Schaumburg High School was ranked 486 in the nation during the year 2012 by Newsweek's Best High Schools. In 2015, SHS had an average composite ACT score of 22.1, and graduated 96.5% of its senior class.

Schaumburg has been recognized as making Adequate Yearly Progress (AYP) according to the provisions of the federal No Child Left Behind Act.

== Demographics ==
In the 2022-2023 school year, the school had 2,340 students. 47% of students identified as non-Hispanic white, 26% were Hispanic or Latino, 17% were Asian, 5% were multiracial, and 5% were black or African-American. The school has a student to teacher ratio of 16.1, and 35% of students are eligible for free or reduced price lunches.

== Athletics and activities ==
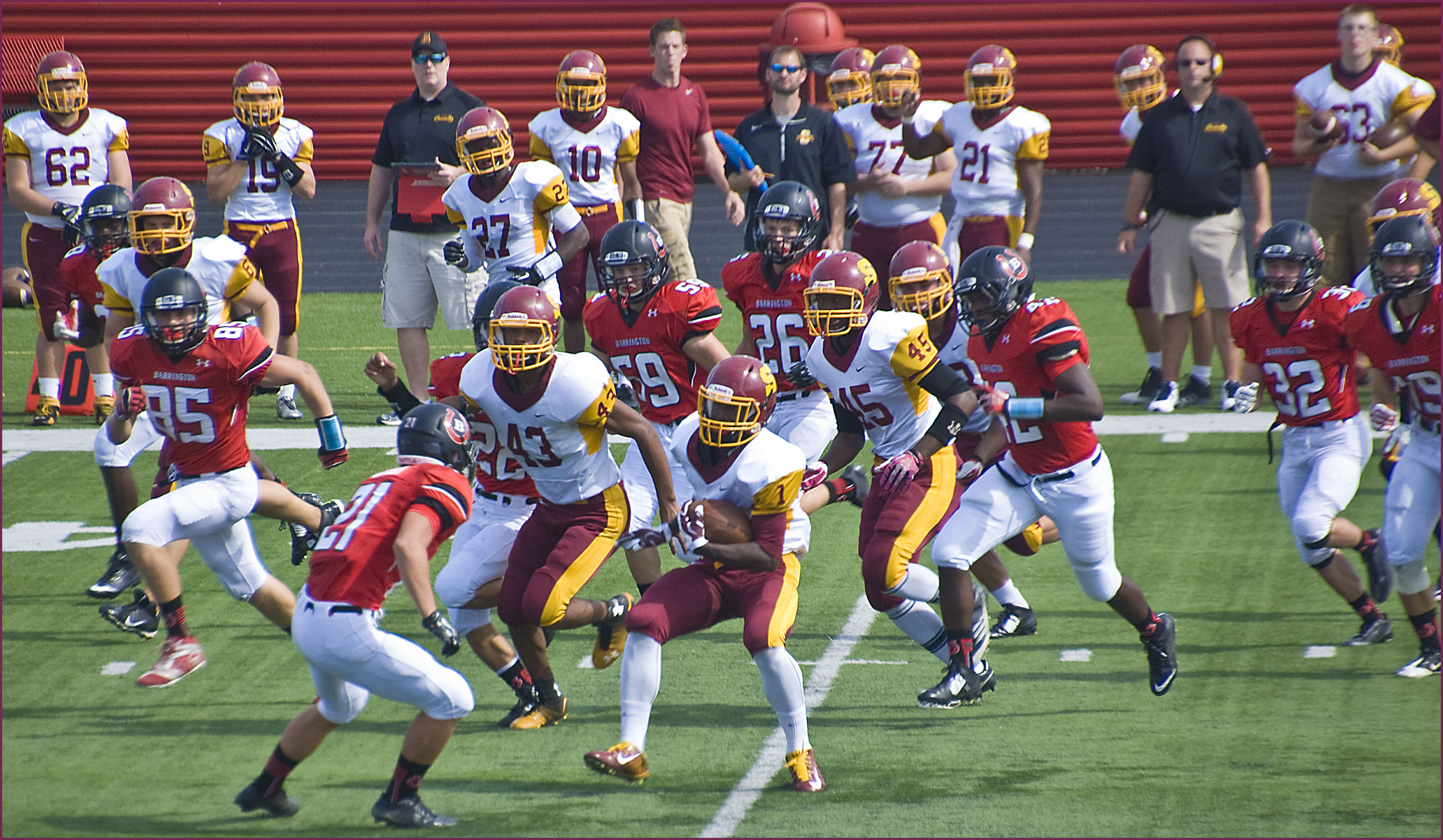
The Schaumburg HS Football team take on Mid-Suburban League rivals Barrington in 2014.

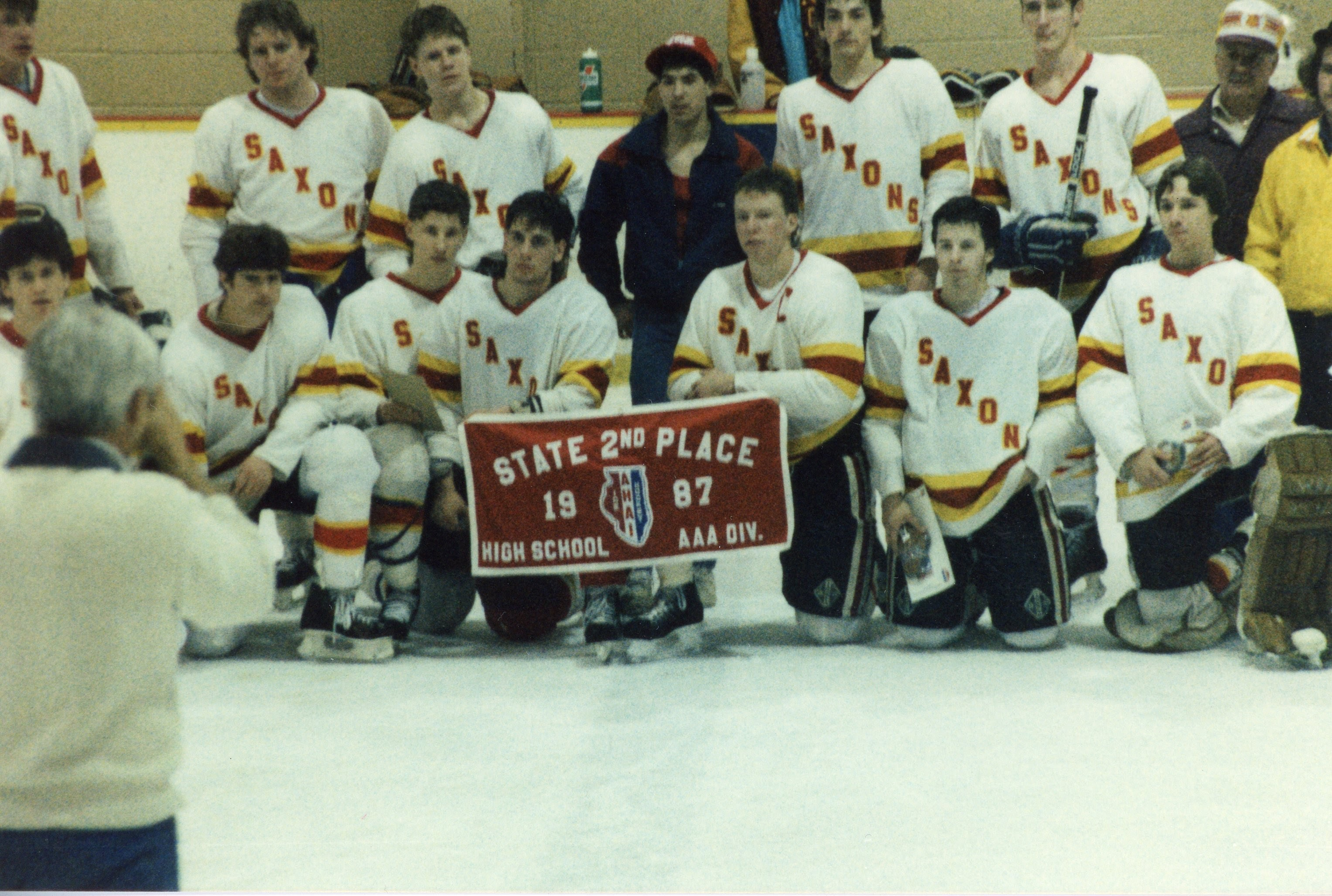
The 1987 Schaumburg Saxons hockey team gathers for a team photo after taking 2nd place in the Illinois State High School Hockey Championship

Schaumburg currently has 62 clubs & activities and 24 athletic organizations. Schaumburg High School is a member of the Mid-Suburban League. SHS is also a member of the Illinois High School Association (IHSA), which governs most interscholastic sports and activities in the state. Its mascot is Siegie Saxon and they are known as the Saxons.

Schaumburg sponsors interscholastic athletic teams for young men and women in basketball, cross country, golf, gymnastics, soccer, swimming, wrestling, & diving, tennis, track & field, volleyball, and water polo. Young men may compete in baseball, football, while young women may compete in badminton, bowling, and softball. The school also sponsors teams for young men and women in lacrosse, though this sport is not sponsored by the IHSA.

The following teams have finished in the top four of their respective state tournament or meet.

- Baseball: 2nd place (1988–89); State Champions (1996–97); 7th place (2005–06)
- Basketball (boys): 4th place (1998–99); State Champions (2000–01)
- Bowling (girls): 3rd place (1973–74, 1982–83, 2006–07, 2017–18); 2nd place (1972–73, 2007–08); State Champions (2003–04)
- Cross Country (boys): 4th place (1980–81, 1995–96); 3rd place (1992–93, 1998–99, 2006–07); 2nd place (1981–82, 1991–92, 1999–2000); State Champions (1985–86, 1987–88, 1988–89)
- Cross Country (girls): 4th place (1984–85, 2002–03); 2nd place (1986–87, 1991–92); State Champions (1982–83, 1999–2000, 2010–11)
- Debate (Congressional): State Champions (2015, 2016, 2017)
- Debate (Lincoln-Douglas): State Champions (2012, 2022, 2023), 2nd Place (2014, 2015, 2021, 2025)
- Debate (Public Forum): State Champions (2014), 2nd Place (2013)
- Field Hockey (girls): State Champions (1977–78) -- discontinued by the IHSA
- Football: 2nd place (1999–2000)
- Gymnastics (girls): 3rd place (2010–11)
- Ice Hockey (boys) : State Runner Up (1987)
- Soccer (girls): 4th place (1988–89, 1991–92); 3rd place (1990–91); State Champions (1992–93)
- Poms: 1st place (2008)(2011)
- Flags: 1st place in lyrical flag, tall flag, and State Grand Champions (2009–10), 1st place in lyrical flag, 3rd in tall flag, and State Grand Champions (2010–11)
- Business Professionals of America: State Champion in Interview Skills (2004–2005). State finalists in four events (2013–2014).

== Notable alumni ==
- Reshma Saujani, CEO of Girls Who Code and author of Brave Not Perfect, graduated SHS in 1993.
- Chris Mueller is an American professional soccer player who for plays for the Chicago Fire in Major League Soccer.
- Alexandra Billings is the first transgender woman to play a transgender character on television.
- Susan Downey (née Levin) is a film producer; married to actor Robert Downey Jr.
- Nadia Geller (née MacNider) is an interior designer, known for television shows such as While You Were Out, Trading Spaces, and Home Made Simple.
- Paul Justin is a former NFL quarterback (1995–2001) who played for Arizona State University.
- Kurt Kittner is a former NFL quarterback for the Atlanta Falcons (2002–2003) who played for the University of Illinois.
- Erin Merryn is a sexual-abuse education activist and lobbyist for Erin's Law, now passed in 37 states and pending in 13 more. People Magazine named her one of fifteen women changing the world. US Senator Gillibrand passed federal version of Erin’s Law in 2015 federally funding it.
- Markos Moulitsas is founder and primary author of the Daily Kos political blog.
- Dr. Christopher J. Schneider is a professor of sociology at Wilfrid Laurier University, known for research and publications on social media and crime.
- Shane Madej, co-host of Buzzfeed Unsolved and co-founder of Watcher Entertainment.
- Mike Carden, guitarist of rock band The Academy Is....
