= Cutting Hall =

Cutting Hall Performing Arts Center
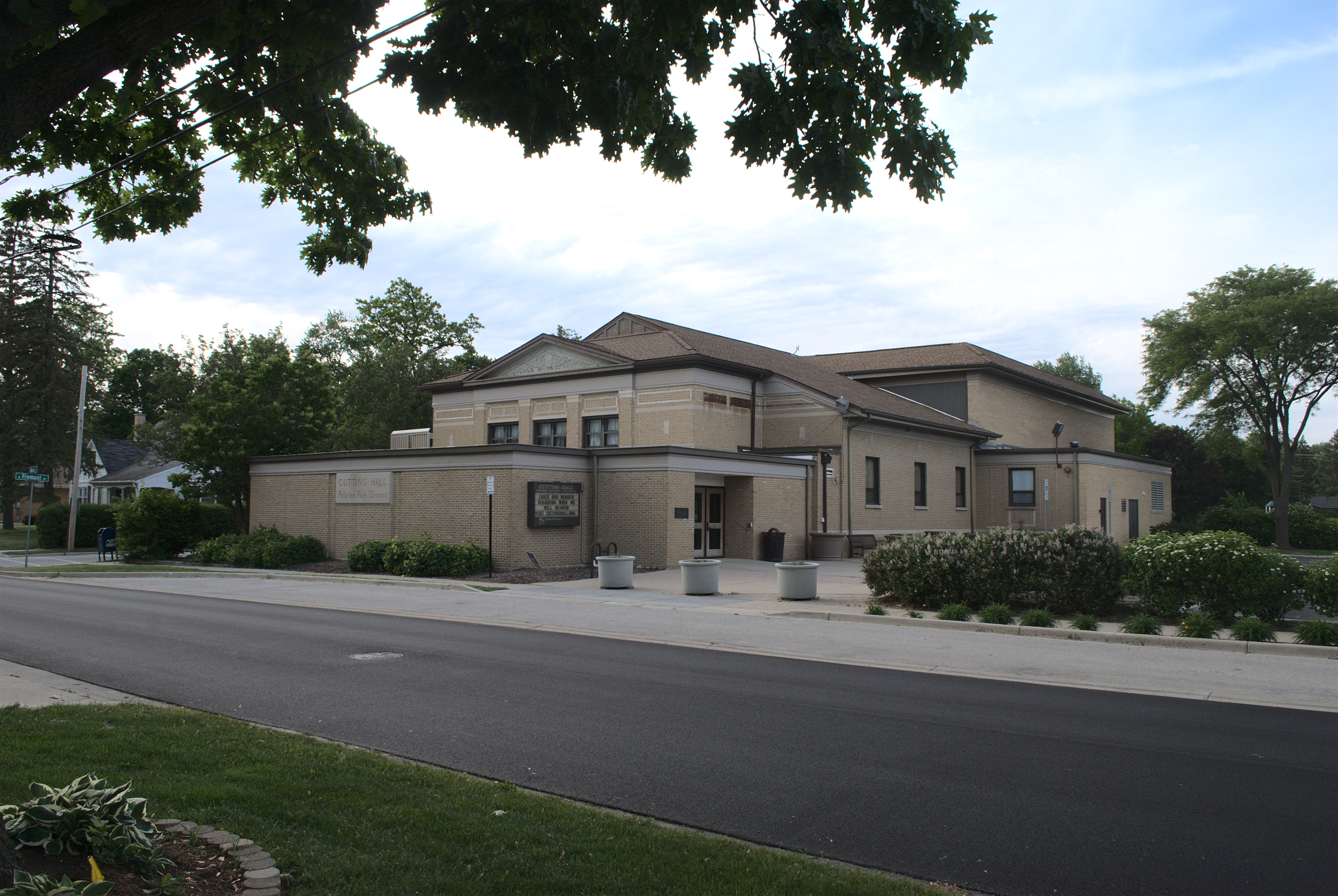
- Cutting Hall
- Interactive map of Cutting Hall Performing Arts Center
- Address: 150 East Wood Street; Palatine, Illinois; United States
- Coordinates: 42.1134°N 88.0397°W
- Owner: Palatine Park District
- Capacity: 430 seat auditorium
- Type: Theatre

Construction
- Opened: 1927
- Years active: 99

Website
- www.cuttinghall.org

Cutting Hall Performing Arts Center is a theater in Palatine, Illinois, which was once the auditorium to Palatine High School. It was built in 1927 in honor of Mr. Charles S. Cutting, the principal of Palatine High School. The remainder of the original school building no longer stands. Three separate building additions were added. After the school district opened the current high school In 1977, a referendum was passed, and the Community Center and Village Hall now occupy these facilities. This beautiful theater has been renovated and seats 430. The main lobby was added in 1978. The box office and entries were the original front entrance to the building.

Cutting Hall is home to recitals, plays, musicals, and movies. Cutting Hall is a facility maintained by the Palatine Park District. The theatre space is utilized by numerous amateur theatrical groups, including Music On Stage, Theatre Nebula, Up and Coming Theater, Lake Zurich Players, Wood Street Theater, Cricket Theatre Company, and The Palatine Players.
