= Erin Merryn =

American writer and activist (born 1985)

Erin Merryn (born February 2, 1985) is the author of Living for Today, An Unimaginable Act, Bailey No Ordinary Cat, and The Diary of a Cat Named Carrot. She is an activist against child sexual abuse as well as the founder of Erin's Law, which requires public schools to teach children personal body safety in order to prevent child sexual abuse. Erin's Law was the first law passed in the United States requiring sexual abuse prevention education to be taught to students in school every year, and it was subsequently passed in 38 U.S. states before being signed into federal law. Erin’s Law has now gone international with a judge in Kerala India requiring Erin’s Law in the 2023-2024 school year. Merryn is a national spokesperson for the National Children's Alliance, becoming the first survivor of child sexual abuse that went through a Children's Advocacy Center to speak on national television about her experience.

Merryn was also the owner of the viral Instagram cat, Bailey, until he died in December 2018. She published a book called “Bailey No Ordinary Cat” that showcases Bailey's unusually gentle interactions with her three children. After Bailey's death, she adopted a kitten named Carrot. She now runs Carrot's Instagram and shares pictures of Carrot sharing a similar demeanor of her previously owned cat, Bailey. Carrot has 296,000 instagram followers. Carrot has her own best seller book titled “Diary of a Cat Named Carrot”.

She has appeared on Oprah, Today Show, Good Morning America, CNN, Fox, MSNBC, TLC documentary Breaking the Silence, CBS This Morning, Katie Couric, Tamron Hall, 700 Club and over 200 local media stations.

== Background ==
Merryn suffered sexual abuse by a male neighbor at ages six to eight and by a teenage cousin at ages 11 to 13. According to her personal account, she told her parents about the latter after her sister confided that she had also been abused by the same relative. The family pressed charges, and the cousin eventually confessed to three counts of child sexual abuse. A judge sentenced her cousin to probation and counseling.

She graduated from Schaumburg High School in 2004 and earned a Bachelor of Social Work from Western Illinois University in 2008. She earned a master's degree from Aurora University in social work.

== Activism ==
"I was not educated on not keeping secrets if someone was hurting me. My mission, through this legislation, is to educate children on what I never learned. I will not stop until children in all 50 states are protected from sexual abuse."

— Erin Merryn

Merryn advocates for sexual abuse victims. She published her diary detailing her cousin's abuse and her own recovery, relapse and reconciliation in book form as Stolen Innocence in 2005. In November 2009, she published a second book, Living For Today, discussing earlier abuse by her neighbor.

In 2008, Merryn helped create Erin's Law, which was the first law to be passed in the U.S. that required children to be taught sexual abuse prevention in school. The law was passed in a number of states, with New York becoming the 37th in 2019. Merryn worked with U.S. Senator Gillibrand on the federal version of Erin's Law to give federal funding to the law, and in December 2015 President Obama signed the federal version of Erin's Law under the Every Student Succeeds Act.

Glamour magazine named Merryn Woman of the Year 2012, and People magazine named her one of fifteen women changing the world and a HEROES Among us in 2013.

== Published works ==
- Stolen Innocence: Triumphing Over a Childhood Broken by Abuse: A Memoir (HCI, 2004; ISBN 0-7573-0282-3)
- "Take Back the Night", Chicken Soup for the Teenage Soul (HCI, 2005; ISBN 0-7573-0317-X)
- Living for Today (2009)
- An Unimaginable Act (2013)
- Bailey No Ordinary Cat (2019)
- The Diary of a Cat Named Carrot (2021)
