= Maria Pinto (fashion designer) =

American fashion designer

- Maria Pinto logo
- Born: 1957 (age 68–69); Chicago, Illinois, USA
- Education: Palatine High School; School of the Art Institute of Chicago; Parson's School of Design; Fashion Institute of Technology
- Occupation: Fashion designer
- Awards: Best of Fashion Award, Chicago Magazine (2000); Gold Coast Fashion Award (1998); Legend of Fashion Award, School of the Art Institute of Chicago (2009); Women of Achievement Award, Anti-Defamation League (2009)
- Website: www.m2057.com

Maria V. Pinto (born 1957) is a fashion designer from Chicago, Illinois. She has designed clothing for Oprah Winfrey, the Joffrey Ballet, Marcia Gay Harden, and Michelle Obama.

== Early life ==
Maria Pinto was born in the South Side of Chicago, Illinois, near Chinatown. She and her twin brother are the youngest of seven children. Her parents, Constantino and Virginia Pinto, are a sanitation worker and a caterer, respectively. When she was still young, her family moved to the suburbs of Chicago.

When Pinto was 10, she started reading a neighbor's copies of Women's Wear Daily. In eighth grade, she started sewing her own clothes after getting a sewing machine. She attended Palatine High School, where she sold clothes to her friends at the age of 15, and eventually sewed her own prom dress from a Halston pattern.

Pinto began working in her mom's West Dundee Italian restaurant when it opened in 1975. When the restaurant closed four years later, Pinto's older brother Silvio opened a restaurant in the River North neighborhood, and she became a partner there. That restaurant also closed, in 1987, and Silvio died of cancer a year later. She went to the School of the Art Institute of Chicago in 1987 when she was 30 and graduated from there in 1990 with a Bachelor of Fine Arts degree, focusing in fashion. She then went to New York and attended Parson's School of Design and the Fashion Institute of Technology, where she also worked as an assistant to Geoffrey Beene.

== Career ==
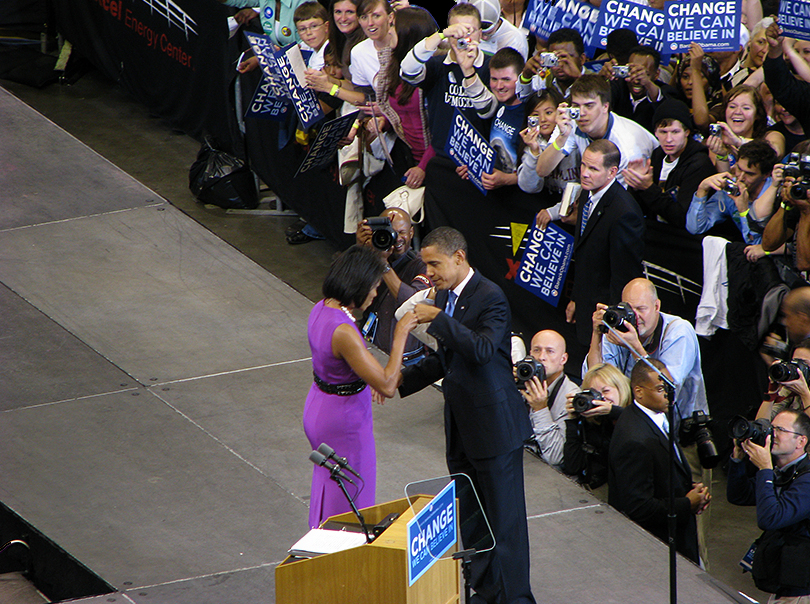
Michelle and Barack Obama fist bump with Michelle in a dress by Pinto

She started her first business, Maria V. Pinto Designs, in her apartment with a $20,000 loan from a friend in 1991. Her collection was sold at, among others, Neiman Marcus, Barneys New York, Saks Fifth Avenue, Takashimaya, and Bergdorf Goodman.

She closed her Michigan Avenue shop in January 2002 because of embezzlement by a bookkeeper and the economic downturn after the September 11 attacks. She also spent six months recovering from peritonitis after laparoscopic surgery but reopened in late 2004 after spending some time oil painting.

Oprah Winfrey wore a long, cognac-colored leather skirt of Pinto's for the 2007 premiere of The Great Debaters.

Maria Pinto designed costumes for two Joffrey Ballet ballets, the pas de deux Ruth, Ricordi Per Due in 2002 and Age of Innocence in 2008.

On August 12, 2009, she opened a retail boutique in Chicago's West Loop. She held a kick-off party for 350 guests to benefit the Museum of Contemporary Art Chicago's women's board. That year, she also was invited to become a member of the Council of Fashion Designers of America.

She was selected out of 100 as one of eight to present a design for the Academy of Motion Picture Arts and Sciences Oscars preview fashion show on February 9, 2009. The fashion show's winner had their design worn by the presenter or a nominee at the 81st Academy Awards in Los Angeles, as well as being able to attend the Oscars. After an online poll, a dress by another Chicago-based designer, Sam Kori George, was chosen.

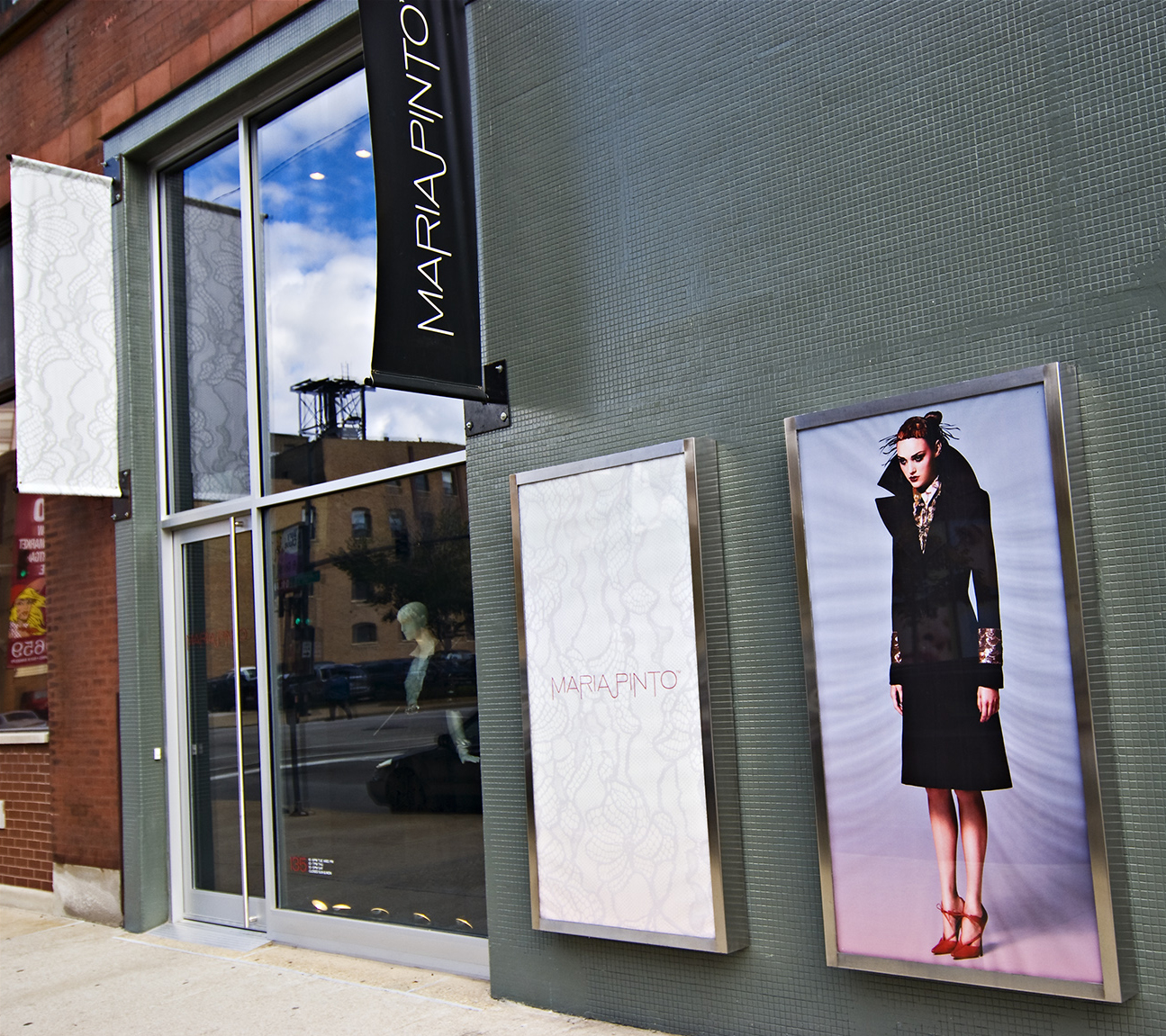
Pinto's boutique in the Near West Side, Chicago (It closed in 2010.)

In spring 2009, actress Brooke Shields wore a bustier and pants that Pinto had designed to a Tupperware event.

Actress Marcia Gay Harden wore a Pinto dress to the August premiere of The Courageous Heart of Irena Sendler.

The next month, television host Nancy O'Dell wore one of her minidresses as co-host of the Jerry Lewis Telethon. The same month, she presented a runway show at New York Fashion week.

In February 2010, she closed her Chicago boutique. The Great Recession caused an economic downturn that hurt the fashion industry—particularly a high-end label like Pinto, whose pieces cost hundreds to thousands of dollars. However, she announced that she planned to return to the business, saying, "I'm here. I just need to take a break. I will be in fashion for sure but in some new facet. I think the whole industry is changing".

In "Fashion and the Field Museum Collection: Maria Pinto", an exhibit at Chicago's Field Museum from September 14, 2012 to June 16, 2013, Pinto matched eight of her designs with twenty-five of the museum's artifacts. In December 2012, about sixty students from Palatine High School and other surrounding high schools went on a special trip to meet Pinto and see the exhibit. Pinto had previously invited Palatine High School fashion students to visit and tour her boutique in January 2010.

On August 31, 2013, Pinto announced on her blog that she plans to launch a new collection, called M2057, with the crowdfunding website Kickstarter. She offered garments such as dresses, jackets, scarves, a shrug, and a wrap for ordering through Kickstarter. They range in price from $75 to $250, much cheaper than her $500–1,000 previous dresses. She exceeded her goal, to raise $250,000 before October 14, 2013, by obtaining $272,523 in funds from 624 different backers. The "2057" part of the collection's name refers to the year in which she would turn 100 years old. Since the Kickstarter campaign, she sells the line through both an e-commerce site and a retail store in Chicago near her old boutique. The clothes are intended to be versatile and low-maintenance, as they resist wrinkling when folded and are machine-washable.

=== Michelle Obama ===
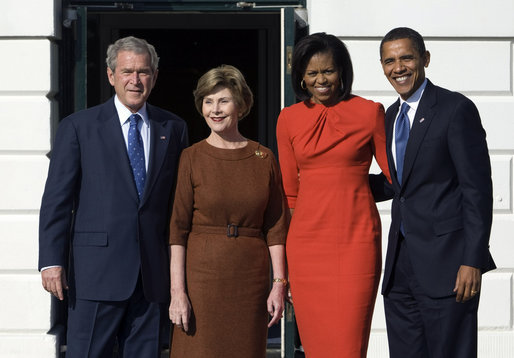
George W. Bush, Laura Bush, Michelle Obama, and Barack Obama at the White House in 2008

One of her clients is former First Lady Michelle Obama. A client of Pinto's referred Obama to her in 2004. Obama wore a white gown designed by Maria Pinto to Oprah Winfrey's Legends Ball in May 2005. When Ebony magazine photographed the Obamas, calling them "the Hottest Couple in America," Michelle was wearing pants made by Pinto. On June 3, 2008, Obama wore a Pinto dress to a campaign speech in St. Paul, Minnesota, where she and her husband exchanged a fist bump that became known as "the fist bump heard 'round the world." On August 25 of that year, Michelle Obama wore a teal dress from Pinto to the 2008 Democratic National Convention. Obama wore an orange sheath designed by Pinto for a visit to the White House with George and Laura Bush shortly after the election. Michelle Obama was on the cover of Parade magazine in June 2014 wearing a dress from the M2057 collection. On October 8, 2014, she invited Pinto to attend her Celebration of Design event at the White House.

== Awards ==
Pinto has won numerous awards, including the Gold Coast Fashion Award in 1998, Chicago Magazine's Best of Fashion Award in 2000, the Legend of Fashion Award from the School of the Art Institute of Chicago, and the Anti-Defamation League's Women of Achievement Award, both in 2009.

== See also ==
- List of fashion designers
