= James B. Conant High School =

- Cougar Mascot

Location
- 700 E. Cougar Trail; Hoffman Estates, Illinois 60169; United States; 42.0374°N 88.0627°W

Information
- School type: Public secondary
- Established: 1964
- School district: Township H.S. 211
- Superintendent: Lisa A. Small
- Principal: Julie Nowak
- Teaching staff: 160.80 (FTE)
- Grades: 9–12
- Gender: Co-ed
- Enrollment: 2,633 (2024-2025)
- Average class size: 25
- Student to teacher ratio: 16.37
- Campus: Suburban
- Colours: navy blue scarlet white
- Athletics conference: Mid-Suburban League
- Nickname: Cougars
- Publication: Tapestry
- Newspaper: Conant Crier
- Yearbook: Conavite
- Website: https://chs.d211.org/
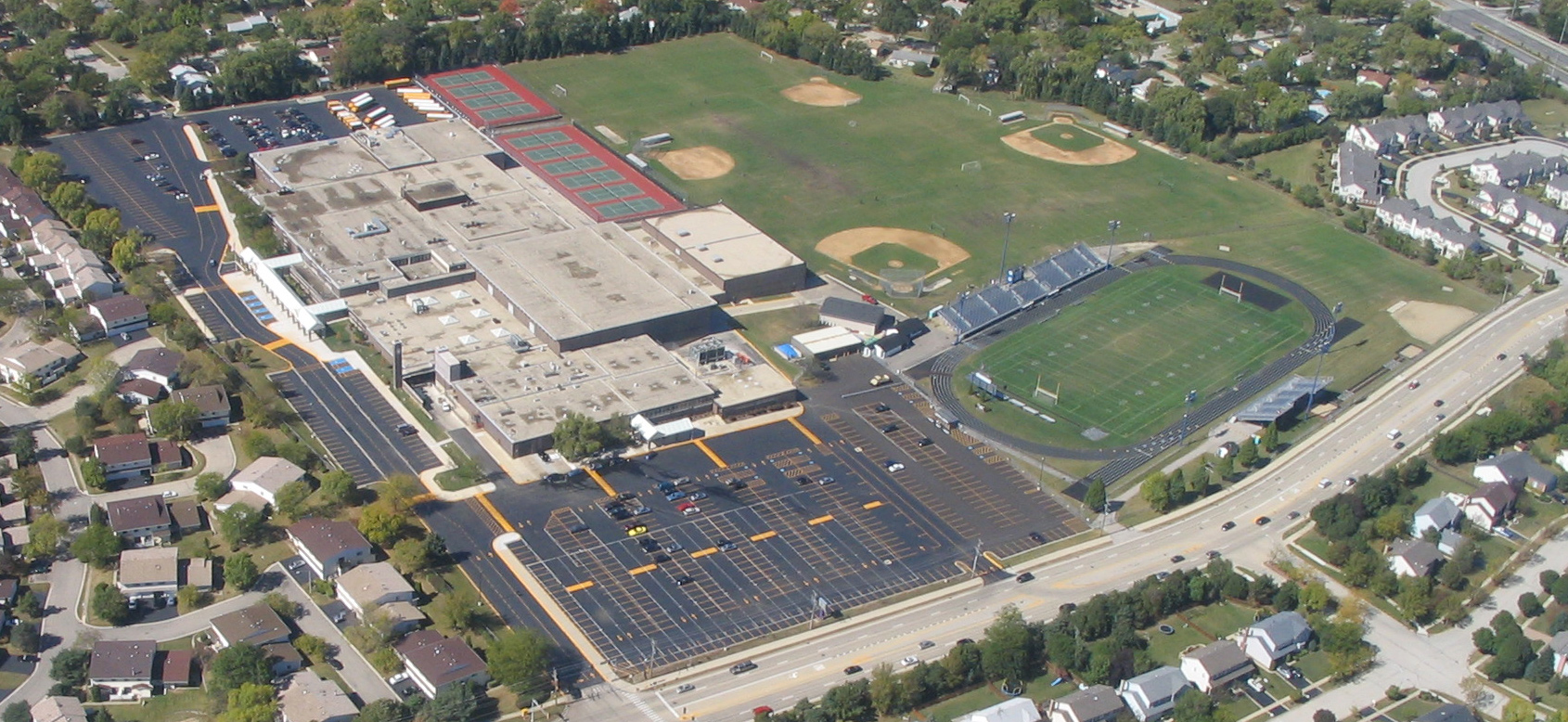

James B. Conant High School is a public four-year high school located in Hoffman Estates, Illinois, a northwest suburb of Chicago, Illinois, in the United States. It is part of Township High School District 211, which also includes William Fremd High School, Hoffman Estates High School, Palatine High School, and Schaumburg High School. Feeder schools are Mead Junior High, Keller Junior High, Frost Junior High, and St. Hubert Catholic School.

== History ==
Conant opened in 1964 and was the first high school built within Schaumburg Township, and the third in District 211. It was named after James Bryant Conant, a chemist, educator, president of Harvard University for 20 years and a leading authority on teacher education, who helped model the high school system used today. Conant serves students who reside in the east side of Schaumburg, the west side of Elk Grove Village, the northern Cook County section of Roselle and the Southeast side of Hoffman Estates.

Conant also served students in the Northern Cook County section of Hanover Park until 2001. In 2000, District 211 approved a boundary change that sent about 300 Conant students who resided in Hanover Park and the south side of Schaumburg to attend Schaumburg High School to relieve overcrowding at Conant.

== Academics ==
In 2018, James B. Conant High School was ranked No. 25 in the state according to U.S. News & World Report, making it the highest-ranked high school in District 211.

In 2008, the senior class of Conant HS scored an average of 22.9 on the ACT, and 94.7% of the senior class graduated.

In 1995-96, the United States Department of Education recognized Conant High School as a part of its National Blue Ribbon Schools Program.

In 2006, Conant was recognized by the College Board as having the highest percentage of students passing their Advanced Placement or AP exams in the College Board's Midwest Region.

In January 2016, the Conant Hyperloop Club, founded by Nick Pope, received a Subsystem Technical Excellence Award in the SpaceX-sponsored Hyperloop pod competition. The award was for outstanding technical merit in subsystem and design, based on "innovation and uniqueness of subsystem design, full Hyperloop system applicability and economics; level of design detail; strength of supporting analysis and tests; and quality of documentation and presentation."

== Athletics ==
Conant High School competes in the Mid-Suburban League (MSL), and is a member of the Illinois High School Association (IHSA), which governs most interscholastic sports and academic competitions in Illinois. The teams representing the school are stylized as the Cougars.

The school sponsors interscholastic athletic teams for young men and women in basketball, cross country, golf, gymnastics, soccer, lacrosse, swimming & diving, tennis, track & field, volleyball, cheerleading, water polo, and wrestling. Young men may also compete in baseball and football, while young women may compete in badminton, bowling, and softball. While not sponsored by the IHSA, the school also sponsors a co-op ice hockey team for young men, along with Hoffman Estates and Schaumburg High Schools. Conant also has an ultimate frisbee club, which competes with neighboring high schools during the spring season.

The following teams have won championships in their respective IHSA sponsored state tournament or meet:

- Cross Country (girls): 1988–89
- Gymnastics (boys): 1986–87, 1987–88
- Gymnastics (girls): 2005–06
- Cheerleading: 2013-2014

== Notable alumni ==
- Laura Albert, professor at the University of Wisconsin-Madison
- William Beckett, singer for The Academy Is...; attended freshman year at Conant
- Sarah Gorden, a professional soccer player with Angel City FC of National Women's Soccer League (2016–present)
- Jennifer Grubb, a professional soccer player with Washington Freedom of Women's United Soccer Association (2001–04)
- Andre Holmes, former NFL wide receiver for the Dallas Cowboys, Oakland Raiders, and Buffalo Bills
- Russ Michna, former professional quarterback in the CFL, AFL, CIFL, and UFL
- Mason Reiger, college football linebacker for the Louisville Cardinals and Wisconsin Badgers
- Emerson Swinford, guitarist and composer living in Hollywood, California
- Tim Tyrrell, former NFL player for the Pittsburgh Steelers, Los Angeles Rams, and the Atlanta Falcons
