= William Fremd High School =

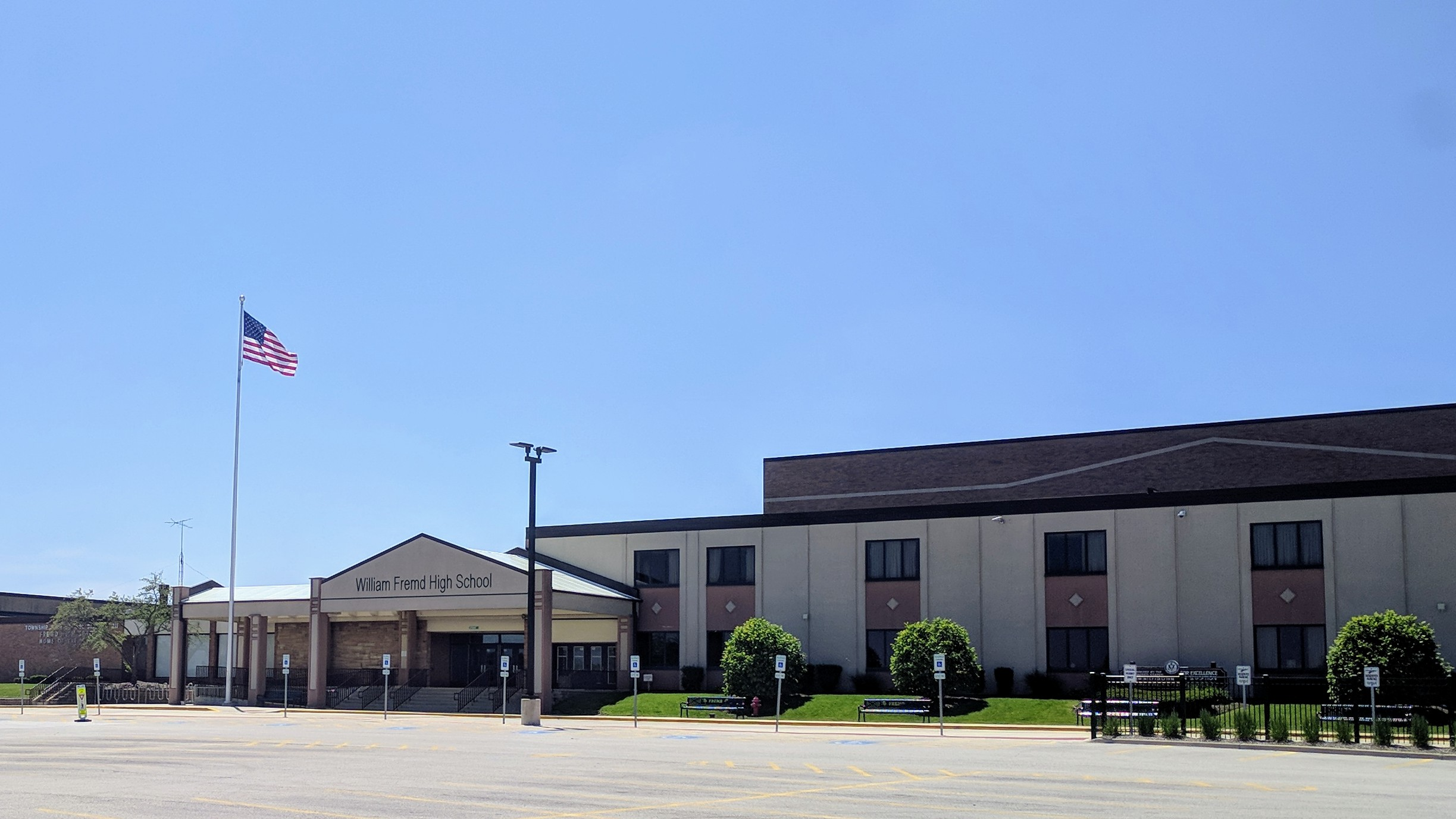

Location
- 1000 S. Quentin Road; Palatine, Illinois 60067; United States; 42.0943°N 88.0661°W

Information
- School type: public secondary
- Opened: 1961
- School district: Township H.S. 211
- Superintendent: Lisa A. Small
- Principal: Mark Langer
- Teaching staff: 162.42 (on an FTE basis)
- Grades: 9–12
- Gender: coed
- Enrollment: 2,689 (2024–2025)
- Average class size: 22.0
- Student to teacher ratio: 16.56
- Campus: suburban
- Colours: Forest Green; Gold
- Fight song: "Viking Fight Song"
- Athletics conference: Mid-Suburban League
- Mascot: Viking
- Publication: The Conspiracy
- Newspaper: The Viking Logue
- Yearbook: Valhallan
- Average ACT: 25
- Average SAT: 1178.5
- Website: https://fhs.d211.org/

William Fremd High School, or Fremd (initially Palatine High School South), is a public four-year high school located in Palatine, Illinois, a northwest suburb of Chicago, Illinois, in the United States. It is part of Township High School District 211, which also includes James B. Conant High School, Hoffman Estates High School, Palatine High School, and Schaumburg High School. Academically, Fremd High School has been recognized by Newsweek as one of "America's Best High Schools" and by U.S. News & World Report as one of 99 outstanding high schools in the United States with the average AP test taker in the class of 2018 taking 5.4 exams. Fremd serves the portion of Palatine that is southwest of the UP NW Line railroad tracks as well as north Hoffman Estates, west Rolling Meadows, north Schaumburg, east South Barrington and southeast Inverness. Feeder schools include Plum Grove Middle School, Carl Sandburg Middle School, Walter Sundling Middle School, and Thomas Jefferson Middle School. Feeder elementary schools are Pleasant Hill, Paddock, Hunting Ridge, Central Road, Willow Bend, Thomas Jefferson, Marion Jordan, Fairview, and Frank C. Whiteley.

== History ==
Fremd opened in 1961 as Palatine High School South. The school was later named after William Fremd who had been a member of the high school board of education for over 30 years and had served on school boards in the area for a consecutive period of more than 45 years. Fremd donated the land for the school. In the first yearbook the school was said to 'blend and stretch into the cornfields'. The school was the second high school to be built in Palatine, Illinois after Palatine High School. Palatine South and then Fremd originally served as the school for all Palatine freshman and sophomores while Palatine High School was the school for juniors and seniors. This plan was only in effect for three years before Fremd was expanded to serve as a 4 year high school. In the fall of 1966 the first junior class entered, and they became the first Fremd graduating class in 1968. Then Junior Cathy Klep designed the Viking logo, based on the Minnesota Vikings logo. Junior, Colleen McGrath designed the school crest, incorporating the Viking logo and modeled after her family crest. A school motto was adopted in 1995 after a contest for students. Sophomore Jessica Frank won the contest. In 2001, construction began to create a new science wing. The courtyard which stood in the center of the school was demolished. After two years of year-round construction, the new science wing was built along with a heating and ventilation facility on the roof of the building.

In the early 2000s, Fremd underwent several construction projects, including the replacement of bleachers in the main gymnasium, renovated tiling, and additional classrooms. The music department added a rehearsal room, larger practice rooms with more advanced sound-proof walls, and increased storage space. In the newest addition to the school, a synthetic turf football field was added. In 2016, a new pool facility was added to Fremd.

On November 2, 2015, The New York Times reported that the federal government determined that Fremd's administration violated anti-discrimination laws because "it did not allow a transgender student who identifies as a girl and participates on a girls’ sports team to change and shower in the girls’ locker room without restrictions." The New York Times added that the student in question "identifies as female but was born male."

As of 2018, Fremd is one of the largest high schools in the region, with a student body of approximately 2600. The school is also noted for its high operating costs: in the 2016–2017 school year, Fremd's district spent $18,721 per pupil, with the average teacher being paid $99,474.

== Academics ==
In 2018, Fremd had an average SAT score of 1178.5 and a four-year graduation rate of 97.9%. The average class size is 24.7. On the mathematics portion of the SAT, 71.3% of students met or exceeded standards, while on the English/language arts portion, that figure was 68.5%. Additionally, 66.5% of students showed proficiency on the Illinois Science Assessment.

From April 1998 to September 2019, 75 students from Fremd earned the highest possible composite score on the ACT, a 36. In the same time frame, only six students earned the highest possible score on the SAT, a 1600.

In 1987, Fremd was named among the top in the nation in the United States Department of Education's National Secondary School Recognition Program. Fremd High School has also been recognized by Newsweek as one of "America's Best High Schools" and by U.S. News & World Report as one of 99 outstanding high schools in the United States. In 2006, Fremd was recognized as the 302nd best high school in the nation by Newsweek, with an average of 1.3 AP tests taken per graduating senior.

== Demographics ==
In the 2022-2023 school year, the school had 2,708 students. 47% of students identified as non-Hispanic white, 32% were Asian, 12% were Hispanic or Latino, 5% were black or African-American, and 4% were multiracial. The school has a student to teacher ratio of 16.7, and 21% of students are eligible for free or reduced price lunch.

== Athletics ==
Fremd competes in the Mid-Suburban League (west division), and is a member of the Illinois High School Association (IHSA) which governs most interscholastic sports and competitive activities in the state. Its mascot is the Viking.

Fremd sponsors interscholastic teams for young men and women in basketball, cross country, golf, gymnastics, soccer, swimming & diving, tennis, track and field, volleyball, chess, and water polo. Men may also compete in baseball, football, and wrestling, while women may compete in badminton, bowling, and softball. While not sponsored by the IHSA, the school also sponsors separate teams for young men and women in lacrosse. Hockey is also a club sport for men.

The following teams have won their respective IHSA state tournament or meet:

- Badminton: 2006–2007, 2008–2009, 2018-2019, 2023-24
- Basketball (girls) : 2019-2020
- Cross Country (boys): 1969–1970
- Flag Football (girls): 2024-25
- Gymnastics (girls): 1984–1985, 1985–1986, 1986–1987, 1993–1994, 1994–1995, 1995–1996, 1996–1997, 1997–1998, 1998–1999, 2004–2005, 2006–2007, 2007–2008
- Hockey: 1990–1991, 1991–1992, 1992–1993. They went 73-1-1 from 1989 to 1993.
- Soccer (boys): 1984–1985, 1997–1998
- Swimming & Diving (boys): 1993–1994, 1994–1995

The twelve state titles in girls gymnastics is a state record. The girls gymnastics team also holds state records for appearances at the state meet, top three team finishes, sectional titles, and regional titles.

== Activities ==
Fremd sponsors 60 clubs and activities ranging from cultural and artistic to academic and technological. Among the activities which are chapters or affiliates of more nationally notable groups are: BPA, Chess, Robotics, FCCLA, Model UN, Tri-M Music Honor Society, National Honor Society, Vikettes (Colorguard), and National Science Bowl.

Five activities have won their respective IHSA sponsored state competition:

- Debate: 2004–2005 (Lincoln-Douglas)
- Drama: 1969–1970
- Group Interpretation: 2014–2015
- Journalism: 2007–2008, 2011–2012
- Scholastic Bowl: 2005–06

The Fremd Vikettes have won state titles in Team Dance Illinois, earning a First Place State Championship in 2010, 2011, and 2012, and Second Place State Titles in 2013 and 2014 for their flag/colorguard performances.

Each year, William Fremd High School hosts Writers Week, which has brought more than 200 writers to the Fremd campus since 1995 to share their work and philosophy on the writing process. Distinguished guest presenters have included Billy Collins, Gwendolyn Brooks, Nobel Prize laureate Leon Lederman; journalists Rick Bragg, Dana Kozlov, Burt Constable, and Eric Zorn; novelists Jane Hamilton, Raymond Benson, Rosellen Brown, Harry Mark Petrakis, and Frederik Pohl; poets Nikki Giovanni, Naomi Shihab Nye, and poetry slam creator Marc Smith; screenwriters Bill Kelly and Craig J. Nevius; and sportswriters Dan Roan and Mike Imrem. Presenters also include selected Fremd students and faculty.

== Notable alumni ==
- Born of Osiris is a progressive metalcore/deathcore band whose members Cameron Losch, Austin Krause, Ronnie Canizaro, Joe Buras, David Da Rocha, Lee McKinney, and Matt Pantelis met at and attended Fremd. Their third LP, Tomorrow We Die Alive, peaked at #27 on the Billboard 200 chart.
- brandUn DeShay is a rapper and record producer, has produced for former Young Money artist Curren$y, Chance the Rapper, Mac Miller and Odd Future Wolf Gang Kill Them All.
- Leslie Erganian is an artist and television correspondent for the Hallmark Channel.
- Jasen Fisher is a former child actor who co-starred in Parenthood, The Witches, and Hook.
- Chris Fleming is an international TV host and paranormal investigator on Dead Famous: Ghostly Encounters, which aired 2004–2007 on The Biography Channel; also co-hosted episodes of A&E Network Psychic Kids 2009–2010 and appeared on such shows as Larry King, Ghost Hunters, Ghost Adventures, The Haunted, and Paranormal Challenge.
- Haley Gorecki, former professional women's basketball guard who played for the Duke Blue Devils in college and appeared in three games for the Phoenix Mercury of the WNBA.
- Ryan Hartman plays for NHL's Minnesota Wild, and previously played for the Chicago Blackhawks.
- Todd Hundley, two-time All-Star Major League Baseball catcher (1990–2003), playing most of his career with the New York Mets; briefly held single-season home run record for catchers; graduated Class of 1987.
- Eric Leonard, former professional soccer midfielder who played for Forward Madison FC of the USL League One and the Chicago Fire FC II of MLS Next Pro.
- Elinor Levin, member of the Iowa House of Representatives, graduated class of 2005.
- Robert Lorenz is an Academy Award-nominated movie producer and assistant director known for his collaborations with Clint Eastwood (Letters from Iwo Jima, Mystic River, Space Cowboys, Changeling, Million Dollar Baby, Gran Torino).
- Ted Nugent is a musician and pro-gun activist with several multi-platinum albums.
- Bette Otto-Bliesner named a notable alumni in 2008, climate scientist and one of the lead authors on assessment reports of the Intergovernmental Panel on Climate Change, graduated class of 1968
- Kris Myers is a drummer for the rock/jam band Umphrey's McGee.
- Chris Perez played professional football in the NFL and Canadian Football League.
- Jack Schumacher is an actor best known for his role as Yancy Grey in the Netflix western drama Ransom Canyon.
- Jim Schwantz is a former NFL linebacker (1992, 1994–98), primarily with the Dallas Cowboys, winning a Super Bowl ring in Super Bowl XXX; in 2009, he was elected mayor of Palatine; graduated Class of 1988.
- Mallory Snyder is an actress/model who was featured on The Real World 13.
- Mari-Rae Sopper was a gymnastics coach and Judge Advocate General's Corps lawyer who was a victim of the September 11 attacks as a passenger on hijacked American Airlines Flight 77.
- Mike Tauchman is an outfielder for the New York Mets of Major League Baseball (MLB). Graduated class of 2009.
- Scott Tolzien (2006) is a retired quarterback who led the Wisconsin Badgers to the Big Ten Conference co-championship and the Rose Bowl in 2010.

== Gallery ==
Fremd High School
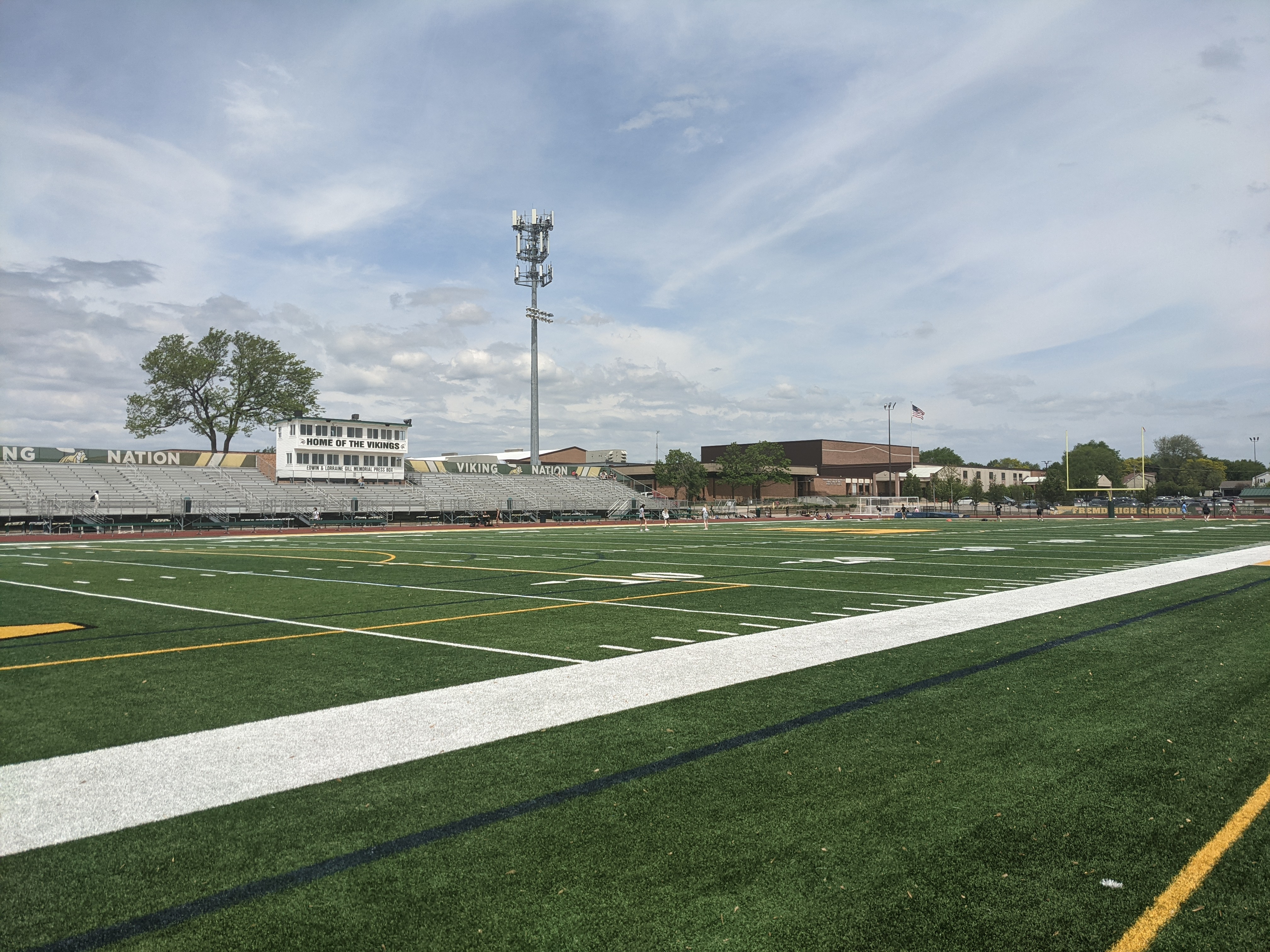
Stadium: home bleachers

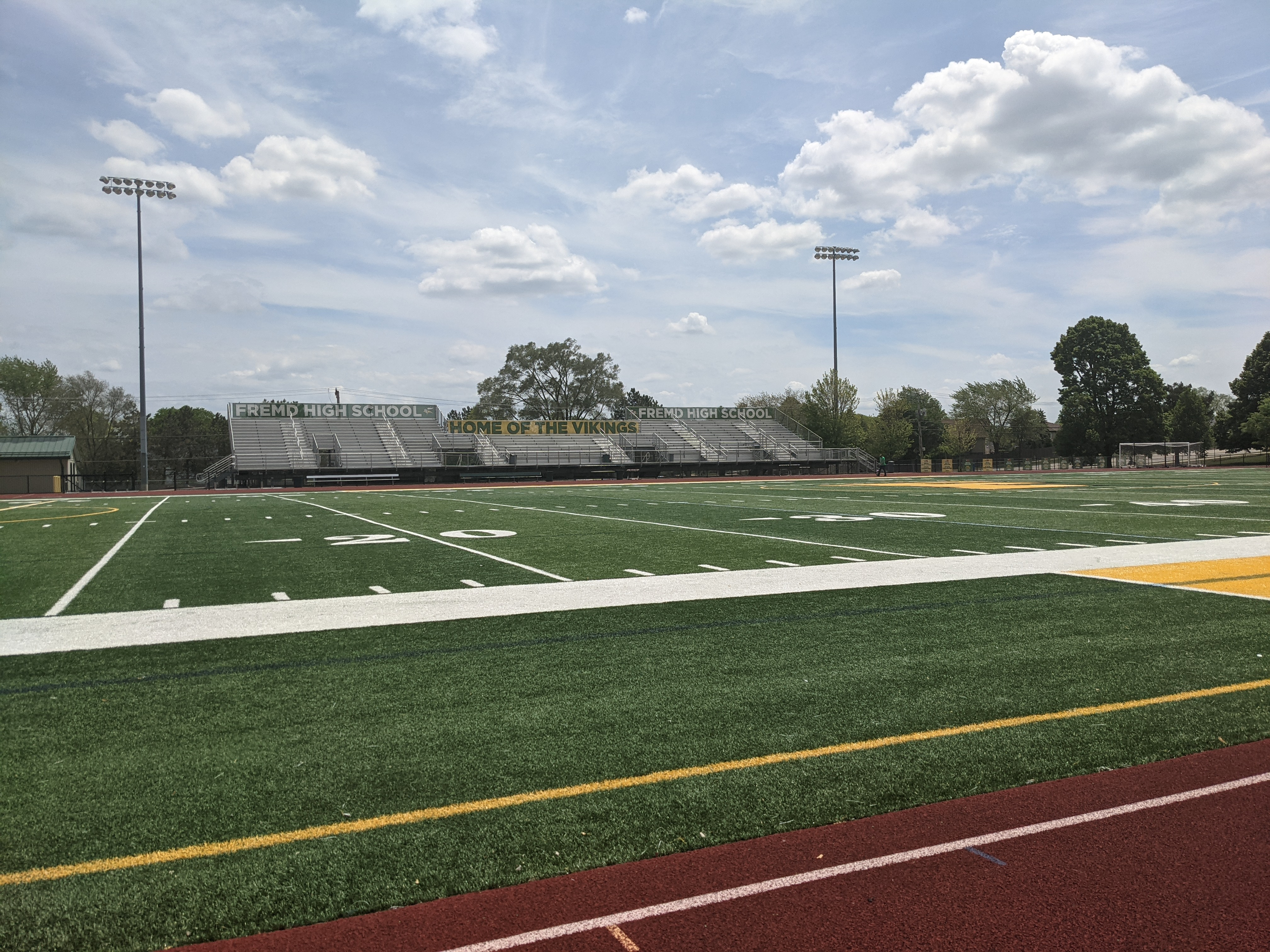
Stadium: visitor bleachers
