= Mason Reiger =

American football player (born 2002)

No. 43 – Philadelphia Eagles
- Position: Outside linebacker
- Roster status: Practice squad

Personal information
- Born: August 19, 2002 (age 24)
- Listed height: 6 ft 5 in (1.96 m)
- Listed weight: 251 lb (114 kg)

Career information
- High school: Conant (Hoffman Estates, Illinois)
- College: Louisville (2020–2024); Wisconsin (2025)
- NFL draft: 2026: undrafted

Career history
- Miami Dolphins (2026)*; Philadelphia Eagles (2026–present)
- * Offseason or practice squad member only

Career NFL statistics as of Week 9, 2026
- Games played: 1
- Stats at Pro Football Reference

Mason Reiger (born August 19, 2002) is an American professional football outside linebacker for the Philadelphia Eagles of the National Football League (NFL). He played college football for the Louisville Cardinals and Wisconsin Badgers.

== Early life ==
Reiger attended James B. Conant High School in Hoffman Estates, Illinois. He committed to the University of Louisville to play college football.

== College career ==
Reiger played as a walk-on at Louisville from 2020 to 2022. In August 2022, he earned a full-ride scholarship to Louisville where he remained through the 2024 season. He missed the 2024 season due to injury. In 33 games at Louisville he had 49 tackles and eight sacks. After the 2024 season, Reiger entered the transfer portal and transferred to the University of Wisconsin–Madison. In his lone season at Wisconsin, he started 11 of 12 games and had 33 tackles and five sacks.

Reiger was selected to play in the 2026 East–West Shrine Bowl, and was selected as that year's defensive MVP.

== Professional career ==
Pre-draft measurables
Height	Weight	Arm length	Hand span	Wingspan	40-yard dash	10-yard split	20-yard split	Vertical jump	Broad jump
6 ft 4 5/8 in (1.95 m)	251 lb (114 kg)	32 5/8 in (0.83 m)	10 3/8 in (0.26 m)	6 ft 8 3/4 in (2.05 m)	4.78 s	1.61 s	2.72 s	40.0 in (1.02 m)	10 ft 5 in (3.18 m)
All values from NFL Combine

=== Miami Dolphins ===
On May 8, 2026, Reiger signed with the Miami Dolphins as an undrafted free agent. He was waived by Miami on August 18 with an injury designation.

=== Philadelphia Eagles ===
On August 31, 2026, Reiger was signed to the Philadelphia Eagles' practice squad.
