= Township High School District 211 =

School district in Illinois, United States

Coordinates: 42°4′51.6″N 88°4′44.2″W

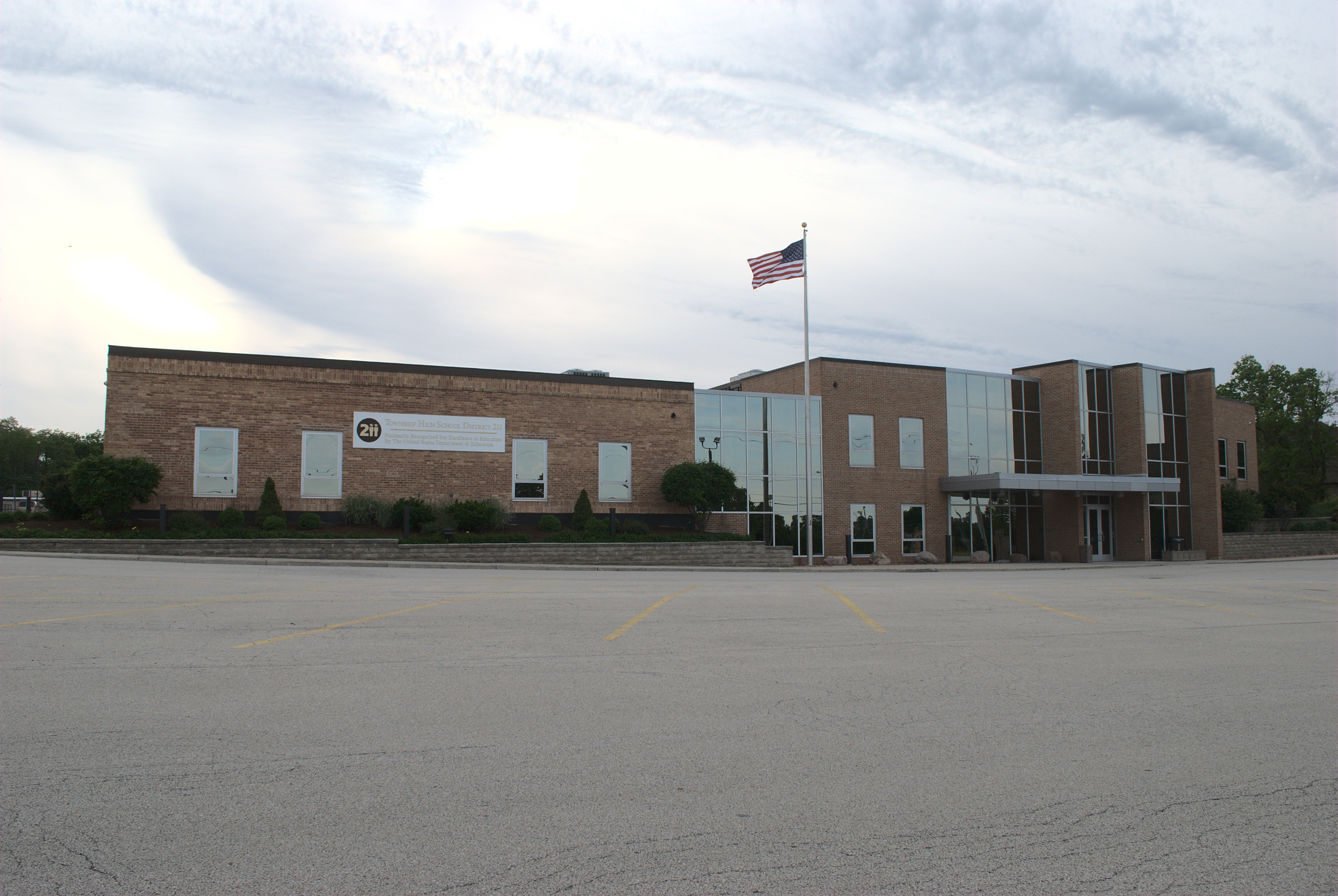
- G.A. McElroy Administration Center, the district's headquarters

Address
- 1750 S Roselle Rd Palatine, Illinois United States

District information
- Type: Public secondary
- Motto: Extraordinary Opportunities. Innovative Teaching. Exceptional Learning.
- Grades: 9-12
- Established: 1914
- Superintendent: Dr. Judith Campbell
- Accreditation: North Central Association of Colleges and Schools
- Schools: 5
- Budget: $263 million (2017-2018)

Students and staff
- Students: 11,857
- Teachers: 810
- Student–teacher ratio: 17.8:1 (Note: The teacher ratio is calculated by taking the ratio of the total student enrollment in the fall to the number of full-time equivalent teachers in the district, excluding special education teachers. Discrepancies may therefore arise between the ratio yielded by simply dividing the number of students by the number of teachers.)
- Athletic conference: Mid-Suburban League

Other information
- Website: www.adc.d211.org

Township High School District 211 is a school district located in Cook County, Illinois, and is the largest high school district in Illinois. District 211 serves the communities of Hoffman Estates, Inverness, Palatine, and Schaumburg, and portions of Arlington Heights, Elk Grove, Hanover Park, Roselle, Rolling Meadows, Streamwood, and South Barrington in the northwest suburbs of Chicago.

== Schools ==
=== High schools ===
School	Town	Picture	Team Name	Colors	IHSA Classes (2/3/4)	Reference
Conant High School	Hoffman Estates		Cougars		AA/3A/4A	
Fremd High School	Palatine		Vikings		AA/3A/4A	
Hoffman Estates High School	Hoffman Estates		Hawks		AA/3A/4A	
Palatine High School	Palatine		Pirates		AA/3A/4A	
Schaumburg High School	Schaumburg		Saxons		AA/3A/4A	

=== Alternative Schools ===
- District 211 North Campus
- Higgins Education Center

== Academics ==
Each school is accredited by the North Central Association and has earned full recognition status by the Illinois Superintendent of Public Instruction. All five high schools have received the United States Department of Education’s Blue Ribbon School of Excellence Award, while Palatine and Fremd High Schools have each been recognized twice.

Palatine High School was one of only 10 schools nationally to be named a “New American High School” by the U.S. Department of Education in 2000. Three schools – Palatine, William Fremd, and Schaumburg High Schools – were named among the “Top 99” high schools in the country by U.S. News & World Report.

D211 carries a curriculum of more than 390 courses, a six-week summer school, and Advanced Placement opportunities in 34 subjects. The District also offers 66 dual credit courses with local colleges, including Harper College, Triton College, and College of DuPage, as well as with the University of Illinois.

== History ==
High School District 211 was named among the elite school districts in Illinois by Expansion Management magazine, a publication for corporate re-location, in 1999, 2001, 2003, 2005, and again in 2007.

On November 2, 2015, The New York Times reported that the federal government determined that District 211 violated anti-discrimination laws because "it did not allow a transgender student who identifies as a girl and participates on a girls’ sports team to change and shower in the girls’ locker room without restrictions." The New York Times added that the student in question "identifies as female but was born male."

== Board of education ==
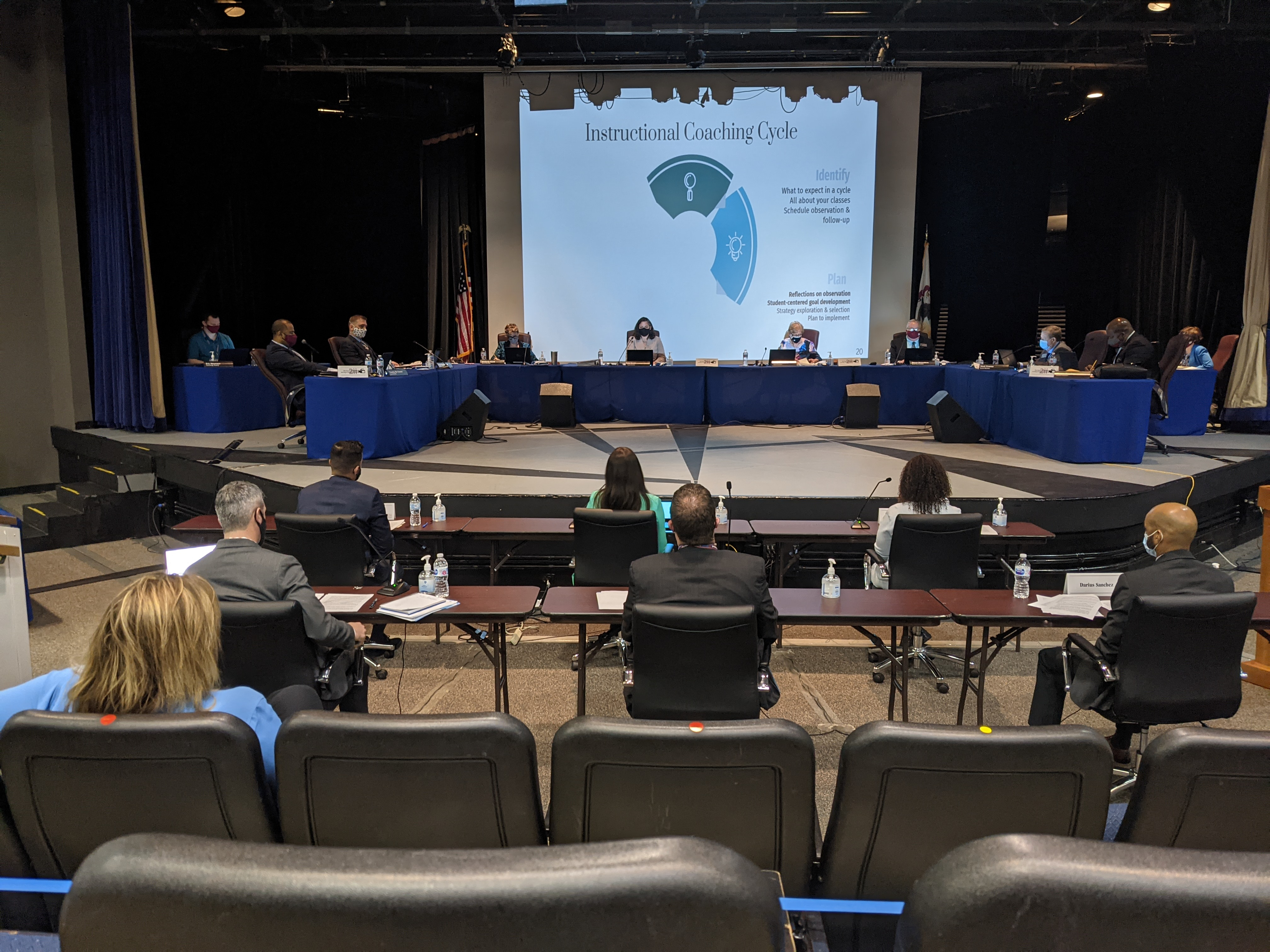
The District 211 Board of Education meeting on May 13, 2021

Township High School District 211 is governed by a seven-member Board of Education. Board members are elected to four year terms in non-partisan, at-large elections with three seats up for election in odd years after presidential election years (most recently in 2021) and four seats up for election in odd years after midterm election years (most recently in 2023). As of June 2023, the membership of the Board of Education is:

- Anna Klimkowicz (board president)
- Steven Rosenblum (board vice president)
- Kimberly Cavill (board secretary)
- Curtis Bradley
- Michelle Barron
- Peter Dombrowski
- Timothy Mc Gowan

2023 Election

In the April 4th, 2023 race, the seats of all four incumbents, Peter Dombrowski, Steven Rosenblum, Mark Cramer, and Kim Cavill were up for reelection. There were 11 names on the ballot. Incumbents Rosenblum and Cavill were supported by the local union along with newcomers candidates Michelle Barron, a mental health expert, and Jane Russell. They were also supported by a Political action committee known as Palatine Supports Public School. The committee was created by a local democrat organization.

The conservative candidates, Mark Cramer and Peter Dombrowski, were support by C4KE, another Political action committee. They were joined by newcomers Susan Saam, and Barbara Valez.

There were two independent candidates who self funded their own campaigns, one was Meenal Dewan, and the other was 19-year-old author Aiden Branss.

The winners of the election were Peter Dombrowski, Kim Cavill, Steven Rosenblum, and Michelle Barron.

=== 2021 election ===
In the April 6, 2021 race, the seats of board members Robert LeFevre, Ed Yung, and Anna Klimkowicz were up for election. Nine candidates ran for the three seats; Klimkowicz ran for reelection, while LeFevre and Yung did not. Curtis Bradley, Klimkowicz, and Timothy Mc Gowan—the winners of the election—ran as a slate. Jessica Hinkle, Kristen Steel, Robi Vollkommer, and Denise Wilson—the next highest vote-getters—were all supported by board member Mark Cramer. The four generally emphasized the importance of in-person learning over remote learning during the COVID-19 pandemic and the need for fiscal discipline within the district. Roxanne Wittkamp received the fewest votes; she was the only candidate not to coordinate with another. Amy Nelson announced on March 18, 2021, that she was suspending her campaign due to an employment conflict; although she was out of the race, she announced that it was too late to have her name removed from the ballot. Despite imploring supporters to not vote for her, she received 3,453 votes.

Following the 2020 protests over the murder of George Floyd and the district's subsequent establishment of an equity team, equity concerns played a notable role in the race. In particular, Bradley and Mc Gowan, who are both black, made social justice a central issue of their campaigns. Their ultimate election to the board was described by The Daily Herald as a success for equity voices in the district and was featured in The Herald's analysis of the impact of George Floyd's murder on the Chicago suburbs. Bradley told The Herald that he thought the voters' acknowledgement of equity issues within the district was partially responsible for his election; Mc Gowan said that he saw his ascendance to the board as a direct response to the previous summer's protests.

Prior to his run for the board, Mc Gowan was an activist who led Palatine's first Black Lives Matter demonstration in June 2020 and openly supported equitable changes to professional development, employment, and curriculum within the district. After Palatine High School teacher Jeanne Hedgepeth made a Facebook post that was critical of the Black Lives Matter movement and compared the term "white privilege" to a racial slur, Mc Gowan described the post as "unacceptable" coming from a teacher and called for her termination. Hedgepeth was placed under investigation for her remarks and was later terminated. Three weeks before the election, Hedgepeth sued Mc Gowan for defamation, alleging that he had made false statements about her on Facebook that had led to her firing. Mc Gowan's attorney disputed Hedgepeth's allegation, suggesting that the lawsuit's proximity to the election might be for political purposes.

Township High School District 211 Board of Education election, 2021
Candidate	Votes	%
Curtis Bradley	9,046	16.66
Denise K. Wilson	3,992	7.35
Robi Vollkommer	5,101	9.40
Kristen M. Steel	5,733	10.56
Jessica J. Hinkle	7,767	14.31
Roxanne Wittkamp	2,061	3.80
Amy K. Nelson	3,453	6.36
Anna Klimkowicz (incumbent)	8,915	16.42
Timothy Mc Gowan	8,220	15.14
Total votes	54,288	100.00

After the election, on April 29, 2021, the board selected its officers: Klimkowicz was selected as president, Steven Rosenblum was selected as vice president, and Kimberly Cavill was selected as secretary.

=== 2019 election ===
Township High School District 211 Board of Education election, 2019
Candidate	Votes	%
Steven Rosenblum	10,387	18.10
Peter R. Dombrowski	11,361	19.80
Will Hinshaw	8,789	15.32
Mark J. Cramer	9,375	16.34
Matthew Saternus	6,110	10.65
Kimberly Cavill	11,357	19.79
Total votes	57,379	100.0

=== 2017 election ===
Township High School District 211 Board of Education election, 2017
Candidate	Votes	%
Ralph T. Bonatz	7,412	14.82
Katherine Jee Young David	8,045	16.09
Robert J. LeFevre Jr.	8,843	17.69
Jean Forrest	7,340	14.68
Anna Klimkowicz	10,093	20.19
Edward M. Yung	8,267	16.53
Total votes	50,000	100.00

=== 2015 election ===
Township High School District 211 Board of Education election, 2015
Candidate	Votes	%
Peter R. Dombrowski	6,089	14.37
Richard Gerber	5,375	12.68
Will Hinshaw	5,569	13.14
Roman G. Golash	2,443	5.76
Mucia A. Burke	6,890	16.26
Lauanna Recker	6,168	14.55
Robert D. Lithgow	4,775	11.27
Edward M. Yung	5,075	11.97
Total votes	42,384	100.00

=== 2013 election ===
Township High School District 211 Board of Education election, 2013
Candidate	Votes	%
Robert J. LeFevre, Jr.	5,352	19.04
Anna Klimkowicz	7,060	25.12
Roman G. Golash	4,265	15.17
Mike Scharringhausen	6,642	23.63
Edward M. Yung	4,790	17.04
Total votes	28,109	100.00

=== 2011 election ===
Township High School District 211 Board of Education election, 2011
Candidate	Votes	%
George P. Brandt	9,436	17.34
Charles Fritz	6,731	12.37
Roman G. Golash	5,973	10.98
Richard Gerber	9,212	16.93
Bill Robertson	8,985	16.51
M. Bryan Neal	6,438	11.83
Mucia A. Burke	7,635	14.03
Total votes	54,410	100.00

=== 2009 election ===
Township High School District 211 Board of Education election, 2009
Candidate	Votes	%
Anna Klimkowicz	13,431	34.11
Robert J. LeFevre Jr.	13,440	34.13
Edward M. Yung	12,503	31.75
Total votes	39,374	100.00

=== 2007 election ===
Township High School District 211 Board of Education election, 2007
Candidate	Votes	%
George P. Brandt	7,064	13.39
Debra Strauss	7,645	14.49
Susan H. Kenley-Rupnow	7,789	14.76
Lynn Davis	7,457	14.13
Charles Fritz	6,598	12.51
Claudia Bailey	4,683	8.88
John M. Cason	4,902	9.29
Patricia S. Schueneman (Pattie)	6,622	12.55
Total votes	52,760	100.00

=== 2005 election ===
Township High School District 211 Board of Education election, 2005
Candidate	Votes	%
Steve J. Marcis	9,274	10.76
Robert J. LeFevre, Jr.	13,039	15.13
Conrad L. Pritscher	7,858	9.12
Mark J. Koller	7,065	8.20
Bill Lloyd	10,305	11.95
Anna Klimkowicz	13,494	15.65
Claudia Bailey	9,864	11.44
William Gruzynski	6,291	7.30
Gerald D. Chapman	9,018	10.46
Total votes	86,208	100.00

=== 2003 election ===
Township High School District 211 Board of Education election, 2003
Candidate	Votes	%
Robert J. LeFevre Jr.	4,300	10.48
Lynn Davis	4,640	11.31
Martha E. Swierczewski	6,525	15.90
Debra Strauss	5,374	13.10
Bill Lloyd	3,760	9.16
Daniel L. Yokas	3,915	9.54
Charles Fritz	4,816	11.74
Michael B. Morris	3,958	9.65
Donald K. "Don" Laxton	3,748	9.13
Total votes	41,036	100.00

=== 2001 election ===
Township High School District 211 Board of Education election, 2001
Candidate	Votes	%
Thomas J. Anderson	5,676	14.15
Susan J. Farmer	7,117	17.74
Donald K. Laxton	3,306	8.24
Anna Klimkowicz	5,566	13.87
Dora Wolf	4,954	12.35
Roger A. Mussell	1,680	4.19
Robert J. LeFevre, Jr.	3,103	7.73
Paulette C. McDowell	4,972	12.39
James R. Clegg	3,751	9.35
Total votes	40,125	100.00

== Feeder school districts ==
- Schaumburg Community Consolidated School District 54
- Palatine Community Consolidated School District 15
