= Township High School District 211 transgender student locker room access controversies =

Since 2015, Township High School District 211, a public school district of the Chicago suburbs, has been the epicenter of multiple controversies surrounding its policies toward transgender student locker room access. Since January 2020, the district has implemented a policy of unrestricted locker room access corresponding to the gender identity of each student.

== Student A ==
=== Background ===
On June 23, 1972, Richard Nixon signed the Education Amendments of 1972 into law, regarding the federal government's policies toward institutions of higher education. Title IX of the act states:

No person in the United States shall, on the basis of sex, be excluded from participation in, be denied the benefits of, or be subjected to discrimination under any education program or activity receiving Federal financial assistance...

— 20 U.S.C. §§ 1681

Congress gave the executive branch wide purview in enforcing Title IX. While Title IX explicitly prohibits sex discrimination in educational programs and activities (including school athletic programs) which receive federal funding, it did not enumerate specific ways in which this was to be implemented. The United States Department of Education has therefore historically created sub-regulatory guidance to enforce Title IX. These rules must be followed by all educational institutions receiving federal dollars, including 16,500 school districts and 7,000 colleges, universities, and other post-secondary schools.

The Office for Civil Rights, which is responsible for implementing Title IX within the department, issued several "Dear Colleague" letters under the Obama administration detailing public policy regarding LGBT students. In 2010, OCR released one such letter stating that while Title IX did not prohibit LGBT-based discrimination, it did prohibit discrimination toward LGBT students based wholly or in-part on sex. A 2014 document from OCR later stated that Title IX covered gender identity and gender nonconformity based discrimination.

=== OCR investigation ===
In December 2013, a student from William Fremd High School, a part of District 211, filed a complaint under Title IX with the Office for Civil Rights. The student, named only as "Student A", was assigned male at birth but identified as female at an early age. From the filing of the complaint onward, she was represented by the ACLU of Illinois. Student A's complaint alleged that the district had discriminated against her because she was denied use of the girls' locker room and was required to dress in a separate, private bathroom. District 211 said that in making their decision to deny access, they weighed Student A's rights with the right of other students to privacy. The district determined that they could not allow Student A access because it would result in students of opposite biological sex viewing each other's bodies. OCR found these concerns to be "unavailing", telling the district in July 2015 that it had violated Title IX by discriminating against Student A on the basis of sex. This marked the first time that OCR had found a school district to be found in violation of civil rights law on the basis of transgender issues. Neither OCR nor Student A alleged that there was a hostile environment or that the district's discrimination went beyond locker room access. In October 2015, the district installed privacy curtains in the girls' locker room and stated that it would not allow Student A to change in the locker room unless she was required to use the privacy curtains. Student A said she would use the curtains if available. OCR disagreed with the district's stated policy of requiring Student A to change behind the curtains because "those female students wishing to protect their own private bodies from exposure... could change behind a privacy curtain". Allowing Student A access to the girls' locker room with the requirement that she change in private was not an acceptable solution to OCR.

OCR and District 211 engaged in negotiations nine times to resolve the Title IX violation. On October 12, 2015, the district stated that it would not resolve the issue voluntarily following a collective decision by the school board and district administration. On November 2, 2015, OCR sent a letter to District 211 superintendent Dr. Daniel Cates to inform him that if an agreement was not reached in 30 days, it would enforce Title IX. Enforcement could have jeopardized the yearly $6 million in federal funding which the district received at the time; its total budget was then $240 million. Superintendent Cates viewed the decision as an overreach.

=== District 211's response ===
On December 2–3, (Note: The meeting began at 7:30 PM December 2 and concluded at 12:37 AM the next day.) 2015, the last days before OCR would enforce Title IX, the District 211 Board of Education held a meeting to determine what action should be taken. In the preceding month, the district had negotiated with OCR and reached a resolution agreement approved by OCR but requiring a vote by the school board. The agreement was summarized as follows:

- Based on the representation of the individual student who filed the OCR complaint that the student will change in private changing stations, the district agrees to provide the student with access to locker room facilities designated for the student's identified gender;
- Any student will have access to privacy accommodations in the locker room through a variety of individual options;
- This agreement pertains solely to this individual student and does not require a district-wide policy;
- The agreement makes no reference to the District violating any regulation or law and reiterates that the District categorically refutes the notion of any violation of law or form of discrimination.

— Mucia Burke, President of the D211 School Board

The board meeting included a two-hour period for public comment. Parents and students addressed the board with their views regarding Student A's use of the locker room. A majority of comments were against the settlement.

After a three-hour closed-door meeting, the school board voted 5–2 to accept the agreement with OCR. Mike Scharringhausen, Anna Klimkowicz, Robert LeFevre, Will Hinshaw, and Mucia Burke voted for the resolution. Lauanna Recker and Peter Dombrowski voted against.

==== Disagreement over the agreement ====
The agreement between District 211 and OCR included language which stated that the district would allow Student A girls' locker room access "based on Student A’s representation that she will change in private changing stations". The agreement did not explicitly state that Student A would be required to change in a privacy stall. The district would also have to take a number of other measures as part of the resolution, including providing a "reasonable alternative" to any student who requested additional privacy. District officials had said that the terms of the agreement with OCR only applied to Student A. On December 3, after the board voted to accept the resolution, Catherine Lhamon of OCR said that it was "facially inconsistent with the terms of the agreement" for the district to adopt this view, adding that OCR would continue to enforce Title IX in any case where the district refused locker room access. In addition, Lhamon said that the agreement allowed Student A unrestricted access to the locker room. On December 4, Superintendent Cates released a statement in response to Lhamon which reiterated the district's view that the agreement only applied to Student A. In that statement, Cates also said that if Student A's actions did not match her representation that she would change in private, the district would revoke her girls' locker room access. A statement later released by the ACLU spokesman Ed Yohnka agreed with OCR's view that the agreement did not require Student A to change in private. Yohnka also said that it would seem unreasonable for OCR not to defend any other transgender student who should request locker room access consistent with their gender identity. On December 7, the district received a letter from Lhamon which stated that the agreement provisions specific to locker room access did not apply district-wide. Furthermore, Lhamon said that the district agreeing to allow Student A access to the girl's locker room was "based on the student's representation that she will change in private changing stations"—language very similar to the terminology already at issue in the agreement. The Chicago Tribune noted that both OCR and District 211 seemed to agree that the provisions regarding locker room access applied in one case, while the other provisions of the resolution applied district-wide.

The Board of Education held another meeting on December 7, four days after they had accepted the resolution, to reassess the district's standing relative to the agreement. As before, the district had a period for public comment, which was significantly more supportive of Student A's case than the previous one. After a lengthy closed-door meeting, the board announced that it would not overturn the agreement.

=== Policy changes ===
On May 13, 2016, the Department of Education and Department of Justice issued a "Dear Colleague" letter which updated the federal government's official view on Title IX. In general, the letter stated that discrimination based on transgender status or gender identity is sex discrimination, and is therefore prohibited under Title IX. (Note: As mentioned above, after the Obama administration, OCR under President Trump issued another "Dear Colleague" letter in 2017 which overturned these provisions. See §§ Background under § Nova Maday.) The letter spoke specifically on transgender student use of bathrooms and locker rooms, citing Student A's case resolution in a footnote:

A school may not require transgender students to use facilities inconsistent with their gender identity or to use individual-user facilities when other students are not required to do so. A school may, however, make individual-user options available to all students who voluntarily seek additional privacy.

=== Lawsuit ===
On May 4, 2016, a group of District 211 students and parents sued the district, Department of Education, and Department of Justice in federal court, alleging that allowing Student A access to the girls' locker room was a violation of their civil rights. The group, Parents for Privacy (sometimes called D211 Parents for Privacy, Students and Parents for Privacy, or simply PFP), said that the federal government violated the students' privacy rights as well as the parents' constitutional rights to "instill moral standards and values in their children". The Thomas More Society and the Alliance Defending Freedom supported PFP in the suit. The lawsuit was the first legal challenge to the Obama administration's interpretation of Title IX as allowing transgender students to use the locker room and bathroom facilities corresponding to their gender identity.

On May 26, 2016, Student A, two younger transgender students (called Students B and C), and the Illinois Safe Schools Alliance filed a motion to intervene in the PFP lawsuit. Student B and Student C both attended feeder schools to District 211. All three students were represented by the ACLU. In June, Judge Jorge Luis Alonso granted the motion. The district did not oppose.

In August 2016, PFP sought an injunction which would temporarily prevent transgender students from any access to the school locker rooms which matched their gender identity. In October, Magistrate Judge Jeffrey Gilbert recommended that the injunction be denied because high school students "do not have a constitutional right not to share restrooms or locker rooms with transgender students whose sex assigned at birth is different than theirs". In December 2017, Judge Alonso denied the injunction to PFP, agreeing with the preliminary decision made by Judge Gilbert. Alonso said that there was "no indication that anything has negatively impacted" the education of the PFP students. At the time, PFP's attorneys said they were reviewing options to appeal.

In May 2017, Student A graduated from William Fremd High School. The lawsuit was not dropped because the case was considered capable of repetition, yet evading review. In July, PFP dropped the Department of Education and Department of Justice as defendants because under the Trump administration they had rescinded the Obama-era policies which interpreted Title IX as requiring schools to provide locker room access based on gender identity.

In April 2019, after nearly three years of litigation, PFP dropped the lawsuit against the district. On its Facebook page, PFP announced that the end of the lawsuit did not mean that its fight was over. A spokesperson for the ACLU viewed the case's dismissal as an important act of closure for the district.

=== Election ===
2017 District 211 school board race (Note: Each voter was instructed to vote for three candidates; the three candidates with the most votes were awarded board seats (highlighted in blue).)
| Candidate | Votes (#) | Votes (%) |
|---|---|---|
| Anna Klimkowicz | 10,093 | 20.16% |
| Robert LeFevre | 8,843 | 17.66% |
| Edward Yung | 8,267 | 16.51% |
| Katherine David | 8,045 | 16.07% |
| Ralph Bonatz | 7,412 | 14.80% |
| Jean Forrest | 7,340 | 14.66% |
| Write-in | 73 | 0.15% |
| Total | 50,073 | 100.00% |

On April 4, 2017, District 211 held an election for three of the seven board seats. The seats of Robert LeFevre, Anna Klimkowicz, and Mike Scharringhausen were up for election; LeFevre and Klimkowicz ran for reelection. All three seats were occupied by board members who voted to accept the agreement with OCR. The other candidates for the three open board seats were Katherine David, Ralph Bonatz, Jean Forrest, and former board member Edward Yung. David, Bonatz, and Forrest ran as a slate who publicly opposed the board's agreement with OCR; all three had pledged to end gender identity-based locker room and bathroom access to transgender students, which the district had allowed previously without pressure from OCR. LeFevre, Klimkowicz, and Yung ran independently of each other, but generally supported the agreement with OCR.

Klimkowicz, LeFevre, and Yung won the three open board seats.

== Nova Maday ==
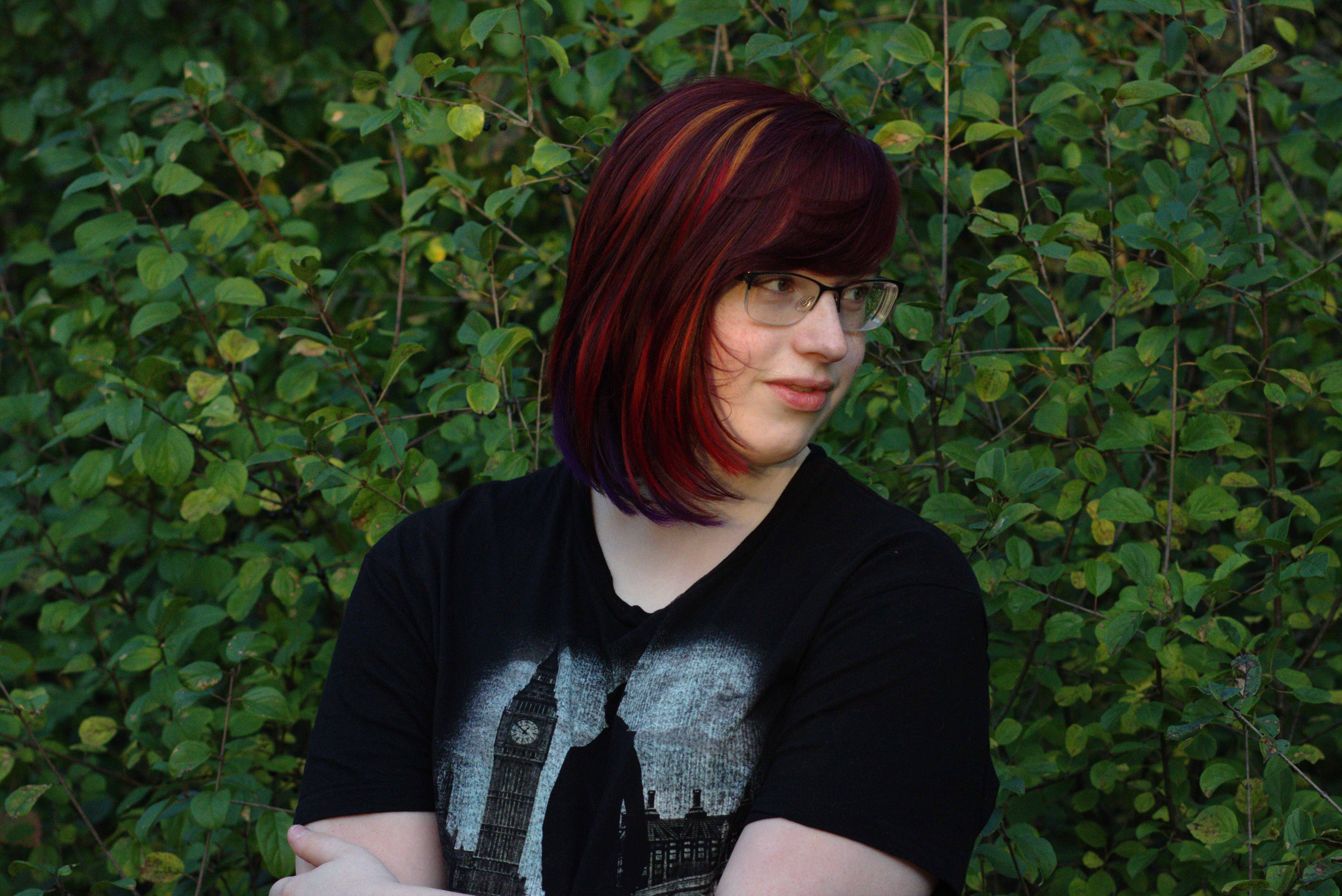
Nova Maday

=== Background ===
On February 22, 2017, OCR and the Department of Justice released another "Dear Colleague" letter on transgender students. This letter withdrew the 2016 letter released under President Obama which had generally stated that discrimination based on gender identity and transgender status were prohibited under Title IX. Under these guidelines, OCR would not require schools to give gender identity-based bathroom and locker room access to transgender students.

Title IX does not expressly prohibit discrimination based on gender identity, but it does expressly prohibit discrimination based on sex in schools receiving federal funding. The Obama administration was able to extend Title IX protection to gender identity because Congress gave the executive branch some power in interpreting and implementing Title IX. For the same reason, the Trump administration was able to implement Title IX in a way which does not cover gender identity. Unlike Title IX, the Illinois Human Rights Act explicitly prohibits discrimination based on both sex and gender identity in public high schools. The Act also allows certain private facilities such as bathrooms and locker rooms to be exempted from restrictions on sex discrimination.

In May 2017, Student A graduated from District 211, terminating the agreement with OCR. Although the agreement's provisions specific to locker room access applied only to Student A, the district allowed other transgender students gender identity-based locker room access under similar terms.

=== Case ===
On November 30, 2017, Nova Maday, a transgender senior at Palatine High School, filed a state lawsuit against District 211 with the help of the ACLU and a Chicago law firm. She alleged that the district had discriminated against her by denying her full use of the girls' locker room. Maday said that the district had initially refused her any access to the girls' locker room and then had granted her limited access on the pretense that she would change in private. According to the lawsuit, this requirement was not implemented for other students and negatively impacted Maday's mental health and grade in gym class. She contended that this was a violation of the Illinois Human Rights Act and sought gender identity-based locker room access for all students as well as damages for emotional distress and loss. Superintendent Cates said that Maday's lawsuit misrepresented the accommodations the district had made for her.

In January 2018, PFP and the Thomas More Society successfully intervened in Maday's lawsuits as defendants.

Maday sought an injunction which would temporarily remove the requirement that she change in private in the girls' locker room. On January 25, 2018, Judge Thomas Allen denied her request because the Illinois Human Rights Act required only "access" to school facilities, instead of "full and equal access" which was removed from the final draft of the bill. Maday appealed the ruling of Judge Allen. Although Maday graduated in May 2018, the appellate court took her case under consideration because it was likely to repeat.

In July 2019, the Illinois Human Rights Commission found that Lake Park Community High School District 108 discriminated against a former, transgender student by allowing him to change in the boys' locker room with the requirement that he use a privacy curtain. While District 108 ultimately allowed the student to change without a privacy curtain, the commission noted that the policy, modeled after District 211's approach to Student A's case, was a violation of the Illinois Human Rights Act. Like Maday, the District 108 student filed a complaint with the Illinois Department of Human Rights that was initially ruled in favor of the district; however, he chose to appeal the decision to the Human Rights Commission, while Maday chose to file suit. ACLU spokesperson Ed Yohnka told The Daily Herald that the ruling from the Human Rights Commission might bode well for Maday's case, as he felt that Judge Allen's ruling against her did not reflect the demands of the Illinois Human Rights Act as clarified by the commission.

In February 2020, the district agreed to settle the lawsuit by paying $150,000 to Maday and the ACLU of Illinois. This marked the end of a four year long period during which the district found itself embroiled in a number of transgender locker room access cases. Legal costs for the district due to these cases were nearly $500,000.

== 2020 Policy Change ==
The District 211 board votes to approve gender identity-based locker room access

On September 12, 2019, District 211 Superintendent Dr. Daniel Cates issued a statement in which he proposed a policy that would allow transgender students unrestricted locker room access corresponding to their gender identity. In explaining why the policy of the district should be changed, Cates wrote that "...understanding and acceptance of transgender identity have advanced – societally and in our immediate communities – for the better" in the years since Student A filed her complaint. As part of the proposed policy change, students who requested additional privacy in the locker rooms would receive accommodations. Over the course of four public meetings, the board heard numerous comments from the community about the proposed policy change. On November 14, 2019, the Board of Education voted 5–2 to allow transgender students unrestricted locker room access. Board members Steven Rosenblum, Kimberly Cavill, Anna Klimkowicz, Edward Yung, and Robert LeFevre voted to accept the policy change, with Peter Dombrowski and Mark Cramer dissenting. The new policy took effect on January 7, 2020.

Reactions to the policy change were mixed. At the final board meeting where public comments were heard, 15 people spoke in favor of unrestricted locker room access, and 10 people spoke in opposition to it. Nova Maday, a transgender student who filed suit against the district over locker room access, told The Daily Herald that she was "ecstatic" that the policy had passed. While she said that the policy was "great", Maday stated that the policy did not go far enough, for example, in how it did not provide for transgender students who want to have their names changed on their student IDs. Board member Edward Yung, who voted for the policy change, explained his position through a personal lens, stating, "I myself have been the subject of discrimination all my life. I know what these people are fighting for." Board member Kimberly Cavill likewise voted for the updated policy, because she felt that "Discrimination is never an acceptable compromise." Before voting against the policy change, board Members Peter Dombrowski and Mark Cramer suggested that an advisory referendum be held in March 2020 before the school board made its decision, a motion which failed 5–2. Julia Burca, a District 211 student, told The Daily Herald that, while she recognized the school's obligation to all students, she felt that the board could have proceeded in a way that would have accommodated students who change naked in the locker room. PFP co-founder Vicki Wilson said that the district's decision to turn such an intimate space coed was "egregious". Additionally, she alleged that there would not be enough privacy stalls for students who wanted to use them and that students who changed in privacy stalls were ridiculed. In response to concerns about unrestricted locker room access, Superintendent Dr. Cates stated that "One of the biggest concerns we continue to hear is the idea that anyone can go in any locker room whenever they feel like it—as if a different gender can be declared at will. That's not the way it works in District 211. Upon a request from the student's parent or guardian, a student's stated gender in the official school record establishes the student's gender for access to gender-specific facilities." Dr. Cates also said that the district's previous policy of allowing limited locker room access over the previous four years had not caused any serious disruptions—a contention opponents disagreed with.
