= Palatine High School =

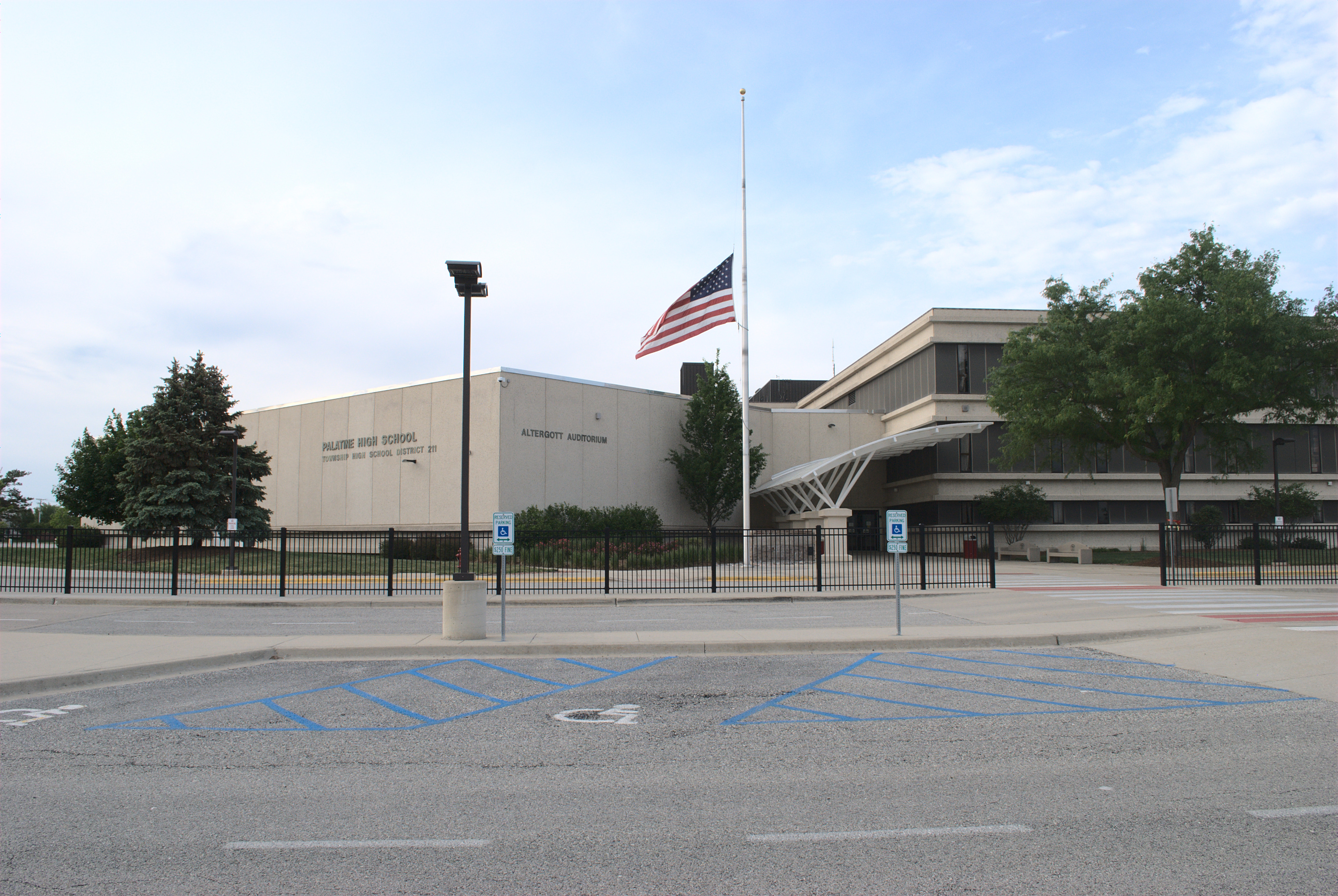

Location
- 1111 N. Rohlwing Road; Palatine, Illinois 60074; United States; 42.1314°N 88.02173°W

Information
- School type: public secondary
- Opened: 1875
- School district: Township HS District 211
- Superintendent: Dr. Lisa A. Small
- CEEB code: 143345
- Principal: Tony Medina
- Teaching staff: 182.49 (FTE)
- Grades: 9–12
- Gender: coed
- Enrollment: 2,535 (2024-2025)
- Average class size: 21.1
- Student to teacher ratio: 13.89
- Campus: suburban
- Colours: scarlet grey
- Song: "Palatine Loyalty Song"
- Athletics conference: Mid-Suburban League
- Mascot: Pirate Pete
- Nickname: Pirates
- Accreditation: North Central Association of Colleges and Schools
- Publication: FACE
- Newspaper: Cutlass
- Yearbook: Spotlight
- Website: https://phs.d211.org/

Palatine High School, or PHS, is a public four-year high school in Township High School District 211. Located at 1111 N. Rohlwing Road in Palatine, Illinois, United States, a northwest suburb of Chicago, it serves primarily all of and only those areas of Palatine northeast of the Union Pacific tracks, but also serves small portions of Arlington Heights and Barrington. In addition, PHS is a magnet school for the entire district's special education program. Feeder schools include Winston Campus Junior High and Sundling Junior High. Elementary schools in the attendance area include; Winston Campus, Lake Louise, Jane Addams, Virginia Lake, Lincoln, Sanborn and Paddock.

== History ==
Palatine High School was founded in 1875, the first public high school in what are now the northwest suburbs of Chicago. Its operation was reorganized into a modern school district in 1914, and in 1928 the high school built its first dedicated school building. It served the entirety of Palatine Township as a public high school, and also admitted paying students from neighboring Schaumburg Township.

In the 1950s, rising enrollments due to suburban expansion and the baby boom caused many changes. Palatine High School's district formally expanded to include Schaumburg Township, two additions were built in rapid succession, and additional school buildings were built in the southwest part of Palatine (William Fremd High School) and in Hoffman Estates (James B. Conant High School). The student distribution changed as Fremd served as a school for freshmen and sophomores while Palatine High School served juniors and seniors.

The current three-story facility was completed in 1977, and a second gymnasium was built in 1997.

In 2003 a new math and foreign language wing was built. This new three-story wing included 24 new classrooms and activity areas, and added 46,500 square feet (4,320 m^{2}) to the existing building.

In the summer of 2009, Palatine's Chic Anderson Stadium was installed with an artificial turf for nearly $1.5 million.

On November 30, 2017, transgender Palatine High School senior Nova Maday filed a lawsuit against District 211 with the help of the ACLU and a Chicago law firm. She alleged that the district had discriminated against her by denying her full use of the girls' locker room.

In the 2025-2026 school year, Palatine High School celebrated its 150th anniversary. At the beginning of that school year, they renovated both locker rooms for over $7.4 million.

== Academics ==
All schools in District 211 have been accredited by the North Central Association of Colleges and Schools; PHS's is the oldest accreditation in the district, dating back to April 1, 1935.

In 2024-2025, 90% of the class of 2025 graduated.

Applied Technology Department

PHS maintains a comprehensive applied technology department with classes such as Computer-Aided Design, Small Engines, Automotives, Home Construction, Woodshop, Metals, and a Plastics course when demand is large enough. Recently, the Applied Technology Department has brought in "Project Lead the Way" Courses: Introduction to Engineering Design, Principles of Engineering, Digital Electronics, and Civil Engineering and Architecture to further bolster the classes offered to students. These classes are all engineering based curriculum that offer the possibility for students to earn some college credit. PHS is certified through Harper College to teach certain classes that count towards credit for receiving an apprenticeship with a Master Electrician. There is also a computer repair class that is certified through the Computing Technology Industry Association (CompTIA) where students that pass the qualification exam receive an A+ Certification, demonstrating competency as a computer technician.

== Demographics ==
In the 2022-2023 school year, the school had 2,652 students. 51% of students identified as Hispanic or Latino, 34% were non-Hispanic white, 7% were Asian-American, 6% were black or African-American, and 3% were multiracial. The school has a student to teacher ratio of 14.1, and 58% of students are eligible for free or reduced price lunch.

== Awards ==
PHS has twice received the U. S. Department of Education's Blue Ribbon Award, once in the 1992–1993 school year, and again in 1999–2000.

In 2000, PHS was one of few high schools named a New American High School. The award, last given in 2000, was given to schools which serve as "model" schools based on innovation.

PHS was selected as an Outstanding American High School by receiving a Silver Medal from U.S. News & World Report magazine.

In 2008, the school was ranked 1157 in the annual Newsweek magazine top 1,300 high schools in America. The school had previous been ranked in 2007 (1204) and 2005 (992).

== Activities ==
PHS currently offers over 80 extracurricular activities for students to participate in.

Varsity Flag Team

The Varsity Flag team has been Overall State Champions for three consecutive years: 2007, 2008, and 2009. Each year they received 1st place in the Tall Flag and Lyrical Flag categories. Additionally, they have been the Overall Flag Division State Champions, having scored the highest of all the teams that competed with a flag routine. They compete through Team Dance Illinois.

Band

The PHS band has been to numerous states across the US, Washington, D.C., Toronto, Canada, and twice to London, England.

The band represented the state of Illinois in the WWII Memorial Dedication Parade in Washington, D.C., in May 2004.

In 2005 thirteen members of the PHS band were cast as extras in the World War II movie, Flags of Our Fathers directed by Clint Eastwood. The scene they were in was shot at Glencoe station in Glencoe, Illinois.

In 2007 thirty members of the band were cast to portray the Syracuse University Marching Band in the movie The Express: The Ernie Davis Story. The scene was filmed at Ryan Field on the Northwestern University campus. The movie stars were Dennis Quaid and Rob Brown.

In 2010 the band played at the White House staff Christmas party, after the PHS choir turned down the invitation to return due to prior engagements. Instead, choir director, Steve Sivak, suggested that the band should play.

Spotlight Yearbook

Spotlight is the name of the Palatine High School yearbook. It was first published in 1920.

Cutlass

Cutlass is the name of Palatine High School's school news site. It began as a newspaper in 1925 and became fully digital in 2014. Cutlass has won several awards, including the Northern Illinois Scholastic Press Association's 2025 Golden Eagle Award. The newsroom frequently publishes news, features, opinions, arts & entertainment articles, and more on a daily basis during the school year.

== Athletics ==
Palatine High School is a member of the Mid-Suburban League (MSL). They are also a member of the Illinois High School Association (IHSA), which governs most sports and non-athletic competitions in Illinois, as well as sponsors their state championship tournaments.

As a part of IHSA they currently host the State Meet for girls' gymnastics.

The school sponsors interscholastic sports teams for men and women in basketball, cross country, golf, gymnastics, lacrosse, soccer, swimming & diving, tennis, track & field, volleyball, and water polo. Young women may compete in badminton, bowling, and softball, while young men may compete in baseball, football, and wrestling.

While not sponsored by the athletic department, the school sponsors a cheerleading team which competes in the IHSA sponsored state competition. They also sponsor a club for cricket.

=== IHSA ===
The following teams have finished in the top 4 of their respective IHSA sponsored state athletic tournaments.

IHSA Top Four State Championship finishes
Sport	State finishes
Badminton:	State Champions (1984–85, 1985–86, 1988–89, 1990–91); 2nd place (1979–80, 1989–90, 1991–92); 3rd place (1981–82, 1983–84); 4th place (1978–79)
Bowling (girls):	State Champions (1991–92)
Cheerleading (coed):	4th place (2001–2002); 3rd place (2002–2003); 2nd place (2003–2004); 1st place (2004–2005); 3rd place (2007–08); 4th place (2008–09)
Cross Country (boys):	State Champions (2011–2012); 2nd place (1980–81, 1993–94, 2003–04, 2004–05, 2005–06); 3rd place (2007–08); 4th place (2010–11)
Cross Country (girls):	State Champions (1989–90, 1990–91, 1991–92, 1992–93, 1995–96, 1996–97, 2009–10); 2nd place (1985–86, 1993–94, 1994–95, 2003–04, 2010–11, 2014–15); 3rd place (2005–06); 4th place (1983–84, 1997–98)
Football:	2nd place (1994–95)
Gymnastics (boys):	State Champions (2006–07, 2021–22); 3rd place (2007–08, 2020–21)
Gymnastics (girls):	State Champions (1987–88, 1988–89); 2nd place (1978–79, 1984–85, 1989–90, 2006–07); 3rd place (1986–87, 2005–06)
Soccer (boys):	State Champions (1994–95); 3rd place (1977, 1990–91, 1995–96)
Soccer (girls):	State Champions (1988–89, 1994–95); 3rd place (1987–88, 1993–94); 4th place (1989–90, 1996–97)
Softball (girls):	3rd place (2017–18)
Swimming & Diving (girls):	2nd place (1983–84, 1988–89, 1995–96, 1996–97); 3rd place (1982–83); 4th place (1994–95)
Track & Field (boys):	2nd place (1958–59); 4th place (1963–64)
Track & Field (girls):	2nd place (1992–93, 2005–06, 2008–09); 3rd place (1990–91, 1991–92, 2000–01, 2001–02); 4th place (1993–94, 2002–03, 2004–05)
Volleyball (boys):	4th place (2003–04)
Volleyball (girls):	2nd place (1984–85, 1986–87); 3rd place (1997–98); 4th place (1983–84)
Wrestling:	3rd place (1962–63); 4th place (1986–87, 1989–90)

=== NXN ===
Both the girls' cross country team, as well at the boys' have competed in the Nike Cross Nationals (NXN) since they were both invited in 2009. Since NXN is an unofficial national race, schools are not allowed to use their school name, therefore both teams use Palatine XC Club.

Team	Year	NXN Midwest	NXN Nationals
Palatine XC Club (boys):	2009	10th	–
Palatine XC Club (boys):	2010	4th	–
Palatine XC Club (boys):	2011	3rd	5th
Palatine XC Club (girls):	2009	2nd	19th
Palatine XC Club (girls):	2010	1st	8th
Palatine XC Club (girls):	2014	2nd	12th
"—" denotes team did not place in top 22

== Notable alumni ==
- Mauro Fiore — Academy Award-winning cinematographer
- Carol Marin — journalist, known for her work in print and on television
- Sheila Nix — served as Chief of Staff to Jill Biden, the Second Lady of the United States from April 2013 to January 2017
- Ronald Kozlicki — former NBA basketball player (1967–68)
- Kevin McKenna — former NBA basketball player (1981–88), current assistant coach at University of Oregon; former head coach at Indiana State
- Maria Pinto — fashion designer; designed for Michelle Obama and Oprah Winfrey
- Len Rohde (1938–2017) — offensive tackle, NFL San Francisco 49ers (1960–74)
- Anton R. Valukas — U.S. Attorney for the Northern District of Illinois from 1985 to 1989; chairman of Chicago law firm Jenner & Block; bankruptcy examiner in the bankruptcy of Lehman Brothers
