= Lake Arlington =

Lake Arlington may refer to:

- Lake Arlington (Illinois), a reservoir in Chicago, Illinois
- Lake Arlington (Texas), a lake in Arlington, Texas
