= Arlington Heights Park District =

Park district in the Chicago suburbs

Coordinates: 42°05′13″N 87°58′51″W

The Arlington Heights Park District is one of the oldest and (financially) largest park districts in the Chicago metropolitan area. With two golf clubs and five outdoor pools, plus one indoor, it can be considered one of the most elaborate park districts northwest of Chicago. The district collects property taxes through the village of Arlington Heights. The annual budget for 2010/2011 was a near $25,000,000. The Board of Commissioners are selected by the community, each of whom selected will serve a four-year term.

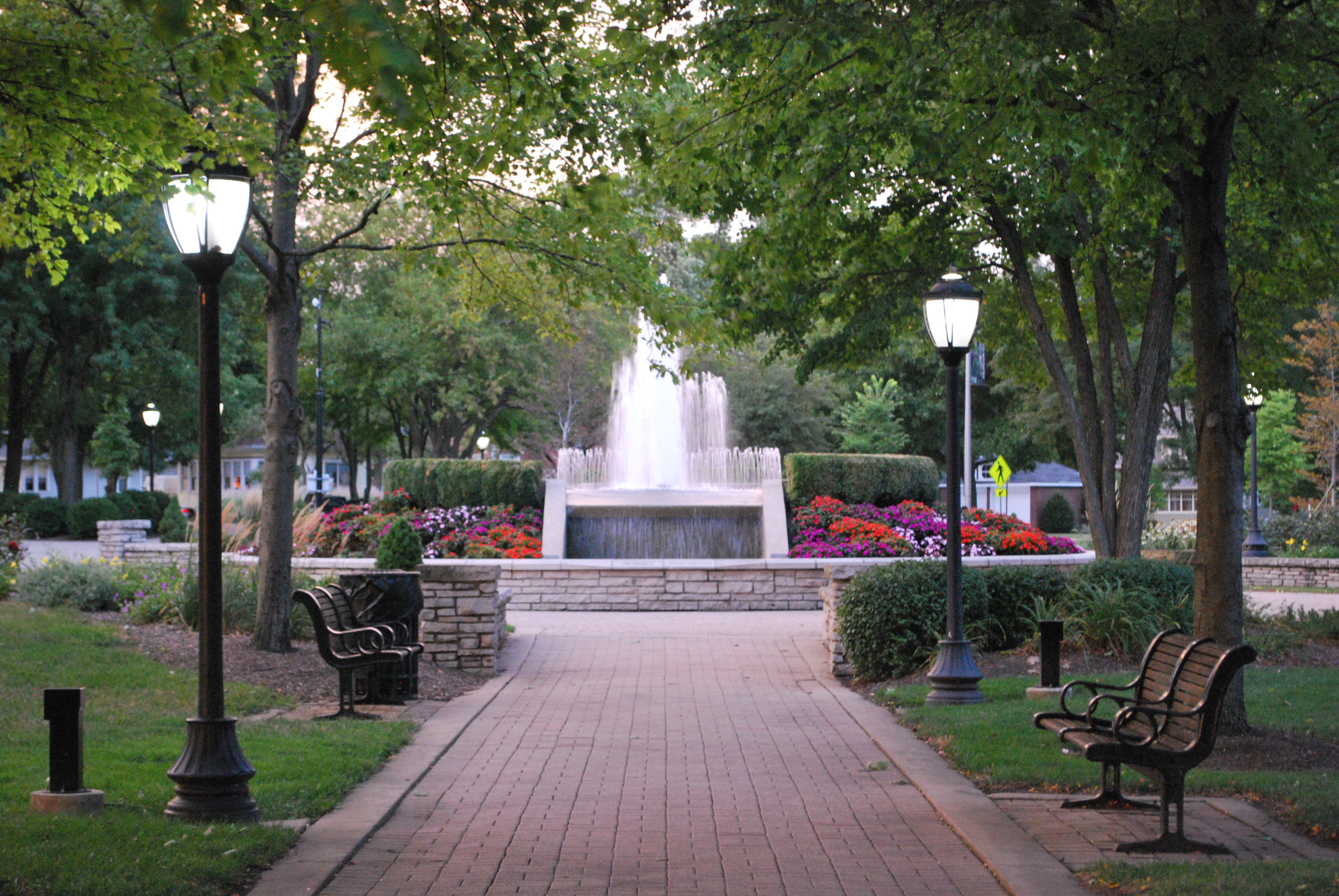
Virgil K. Horath Fountain located at North School Park in Arlington Heights, IL.

== History ==
The Arlington Heights Park District was established in 1925 with Commissioners Nathaniel Banta, Henry Klehm, Eugene Berbecker, Albert Volz, and Julius Flentie.

== Jurisdiction ==
The 16.2-square-mile (42 km^{2}) District is located in northern Cook County and southern Lake County 27 miles (43 km) northwest of downtown Chicago. It lies in Elk Grove and Wheeling Townships and is bordered by Buffalo Grove and Wheeling to the north; Elk Grove Village on the south; on the west by Rolling Meadows and Palatine; on the east by Mt. Prospect. The District serves most of Arlington Heights and small portions of Palatine, Mt. Prospect, Prospect Heights, Rolling Meadows, and Lake County.

== Facilities ==
The District owns 456.53 acres (1.8 km^{2}), leases 258.56 acres (1.0 km^{2}) of land and has 58 parks: community parks, neighborhood parks, play lots, passive parks, and linear parks. Recreational facilities include five outdoor swimming pools, five community centers (each with gymnasium and meeting rooms), a cultural arts center, historical museum, senior center, Forest View Racquet and Fitness Club, Heritage Tennis Club, Arlington Lakes Golf Club, Arlington Ridge Center, Nickol Knoll Golf Club, Melas Park Softball Complex, Lake Arlington's 1.8-mile (2.9 km) walk/bike path and boating lake of 50 acres (200,000 m^{2}), Sunset Meadows driving range, athletic fields and 0.88-mile (1.42 km) walking path, 45 ball diamonds (41 Park District, 4 School District), 3 football fields and 7 soccer fields (5 Park District, 2 School District), 42 playgrounds, 52 outdoor tennis courts, 16 outdoor ice skating rinks, 7 sand volleyball courts, 30 basketball courts and 17 picnic areas.

Aquatic Facilities
Facility	Address	Community Center
Arlington Ridge Center Arlington Ridge Center	660 N Ridge Ave, Arlington Heights, IL 60004	Multi-use facility
Camelot	1005 E Suffield Dr, Arlington Heights, IL 60004	Yes
Frontier	1933 N Kennicott Dr, Arlington Heights, IL 60004	Yes
Heritage	506 W Victoria Ln, Arlington Heights, IL 60005	Yes
Pioneer Pioneer Pool	500 S Fernandez Ave, Arlington Heights, IL 60005	Yes
Recreation Recreation Park Pool House	500 E Miner St, Arlington Heights, IL 60004	Yes

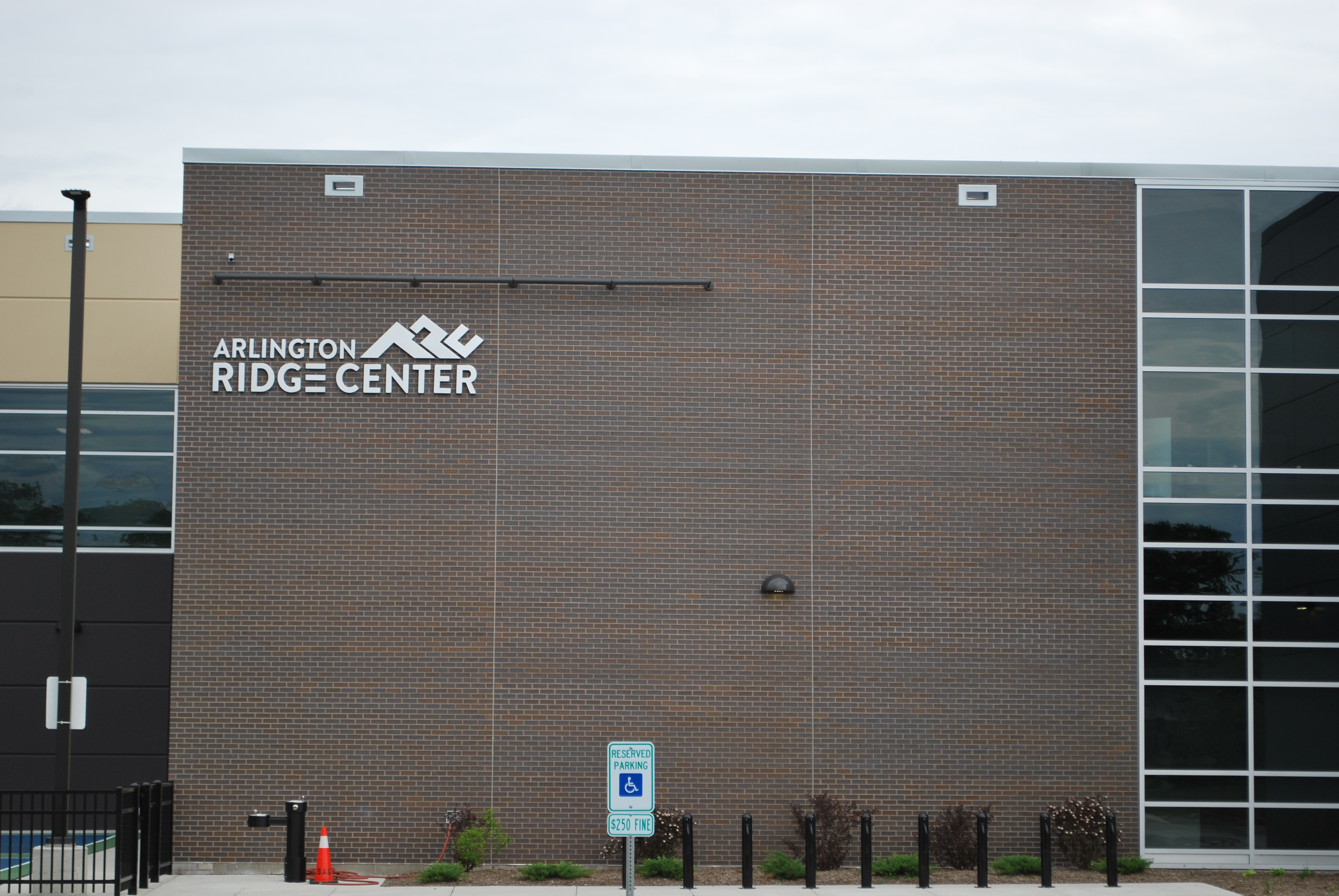
Arlington Ridge Center, a facility of the Arlington Heights Park District.

== Special events ==
The district helps run a series of annual events on the most popular holidays.

=== Independence Day ===
Every year, the Arlington Heights Park District, along with the Village and Festival Members, runs an event called Frontier Days. During this time period of June 30- July 5, the North American Midway Carnival runs a carnival and supplies rides and games for the community.

=== Christmas ===
During late November, the district sponsors the decorations covering at North School Park in Arlington Heights. Each year the district sells an old sculpture in spite of purchasing a new. The district also helps sponsor the Kris Kringle Market. The market runs from mid-December up until Christmas.

== See also ==
- Rolling Meadows Park District
- Arlington Heights, Illinois
- Park district
