= John Boss =

John Boss may refer to:

- John B. Boss, American actor
- John George Boss (1781–1837), British naval officer and politician
- John Linscom Boss Jr. (1780–1819), U.S. Representative from Rhode Island
