= John B. Boss =

American actor

- Born: November 23
- Education: Curie Metropolitan High School
- Occupation: Actor
- Years active: 2009–present

John B. Boss (born November 23) is an American actor known for playing Roger De Bris in the national tour production of The Producers.

== Filmography ==
=== Film ===
Year	Title	Role	Notes
2009	Fluffenhaus: The Comeback of a Pop Culture Icon	Evil Thug	
2010	Educating Cooper	Uncle	
2010	Before Mirrors	Vampire	
2010	Periods of Rain	Dixie	
2010	IronStag Kills Again	General Hafenrichter	
2011	Fall Away	Bar Patron	
2012	Family Traditions	Scalp Victim	
2012	Stockholm Santa	Santa Claus	
2013	If I Die Tomorrow	Dr. James	
2013	The Night-Like Daydreams of Wolfgang Deedle	Woman with Dog	Makeup artist
2014	Coast	Ceo #4	
2014	She Be the One	Peter	
2014	The Dark Hunger	Mob Boss	
2014	The Irony of Fear Flying High	Herb Wilkins	
2014	Hogtown	Mission Home Priest	
2014	Close Up	Jim	
2014	Fear of a Memory	SS Officer	

=== Theater ===
Year	Title	Role	Notes
2014	A Christmas Carol	Scrooge	Metropolis Performing Arts Centre
2015–2016	The Producers	Roger De Bris	National Tour
2018	Annie	Oliver Warbucks	
