= Albert Volz =

American politician and businessman (1871–1971)

Member of the Illinois House of Representatives
- In office 1917–1923

Personal details
- Born: Albert Frederick Volz; May 12, 1871 Arlington Heights, Illinois, U.S.
- Died: June 5, 1971 (aged 100) Arlington Heights, Illinois, U.S.
- Party: Republican
- Occupation: Politician, businessman

Albert Frederick Volz (May 12, 1871 – June 5, 1971) was an American businessman and politician.

Volz was born in Arlington Heights, Illinois. He was involved with the foundry manufacturing business in Arlington Heights. He served on the Arlington Heights Board of Trustees and as Mayor of Arlington Heights. Volz also served on the parks and school boards. Volz was a Republican. He served in the Illinois House of Representatives from 1917 to 1923. Volz died at the Northwestern Community Hospital in Arlington Heights, Illinois.
