= Arlington Heights School District 25 =

School district in Illinois, United States

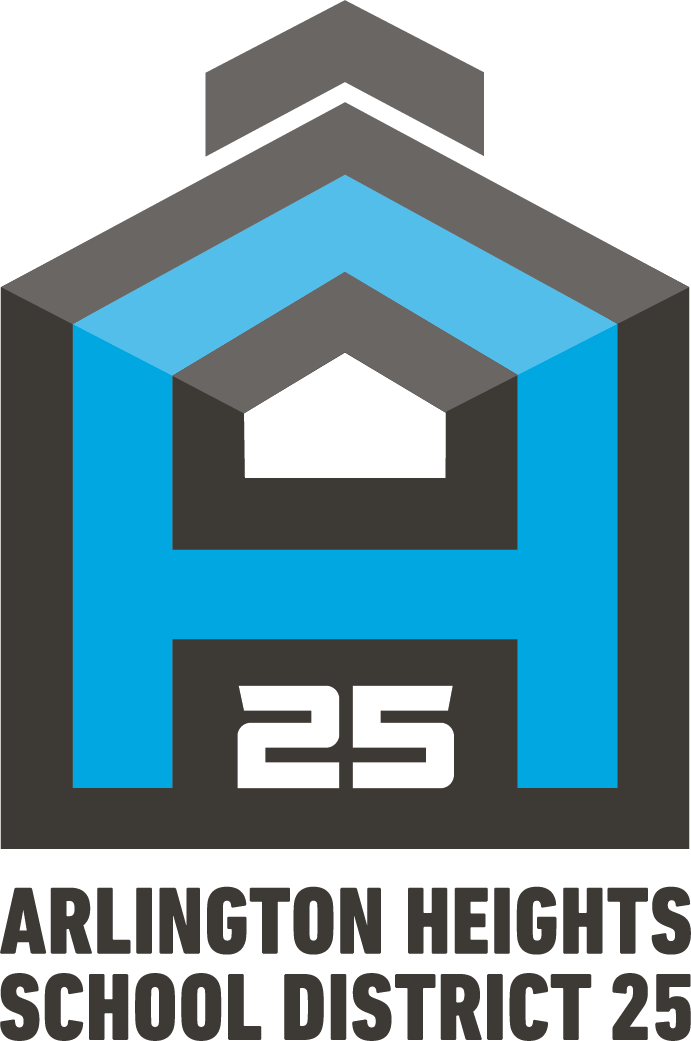

Location
- Arlington Heights Cook County, Illinois, 60004-60005; United States
- Coordinates: 42.092386°N 87.981673°W

District information
- Motto: Together Today 2 Transform Tomorrow
- Grades: PK – 8
- Superintendent: Dr. Brian Kaye
- Enrollment: 5,266

Other information
- Website: www.sd25.org

Arlington Heights School District 25 (AHSD25) is a school district that serves and is based in Arlington Heights, Illinois, a suburb of Chicago. The school district serves over 5,550 students in nine schools.

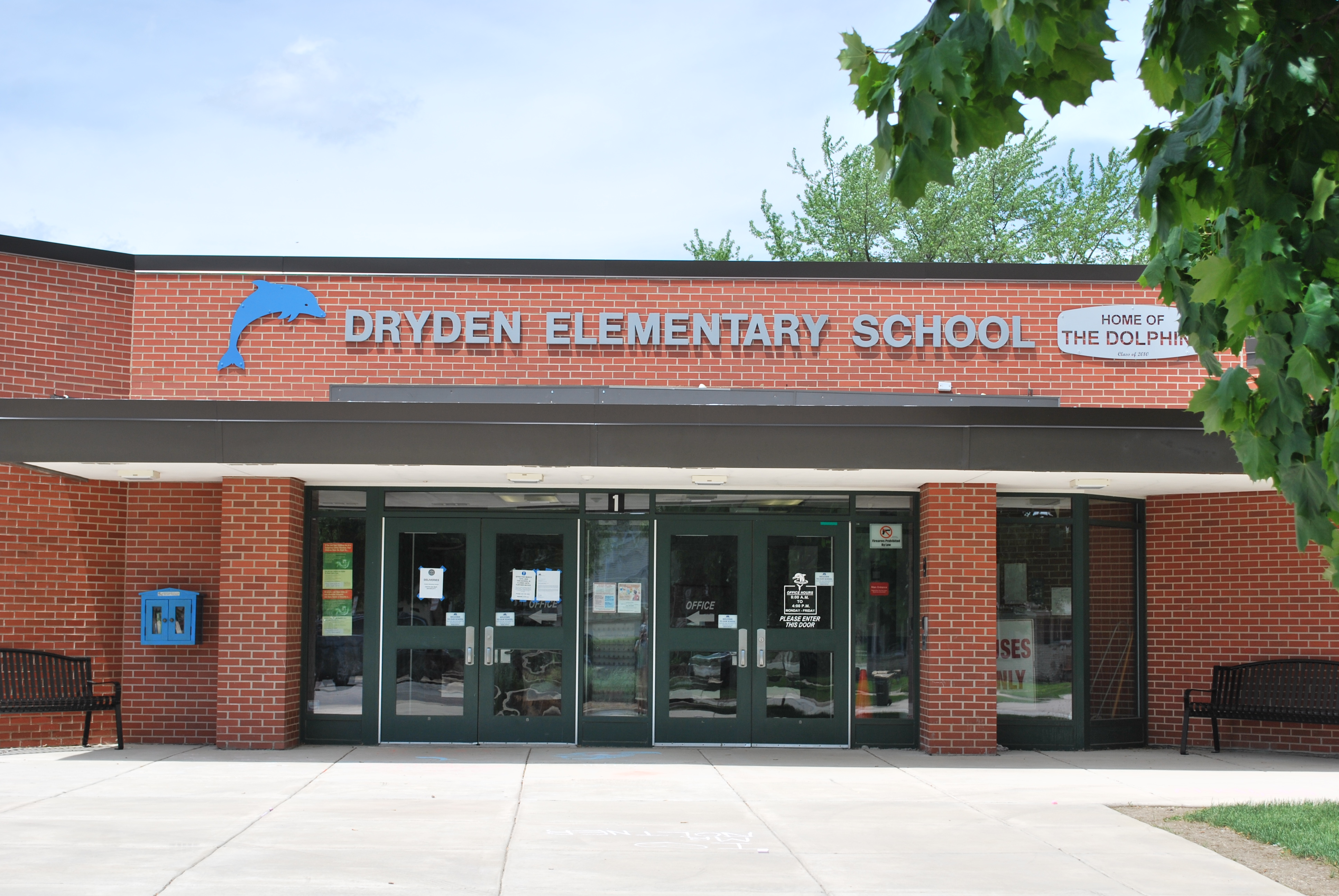
Dryden Elementary School

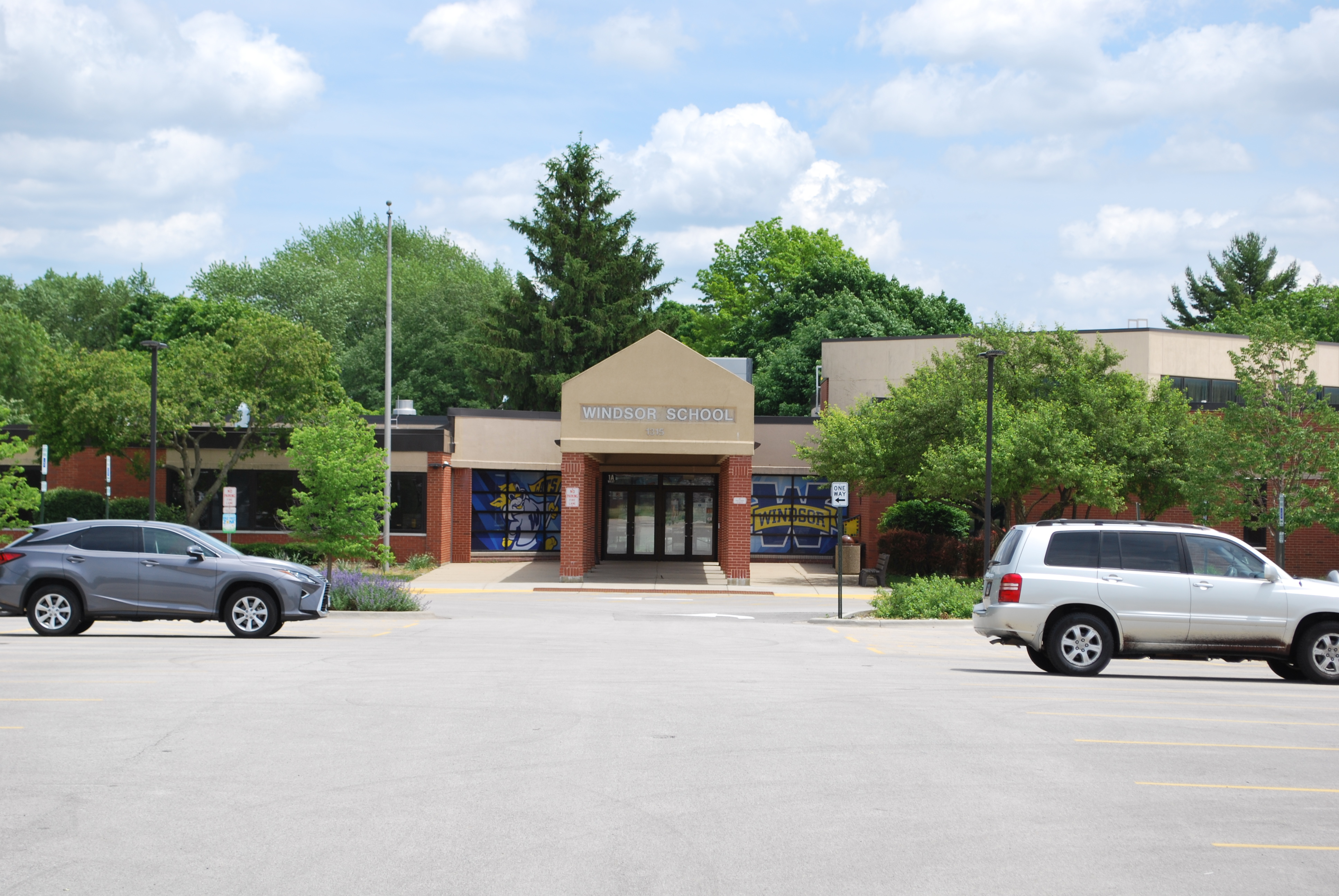
Windsor Elementary School

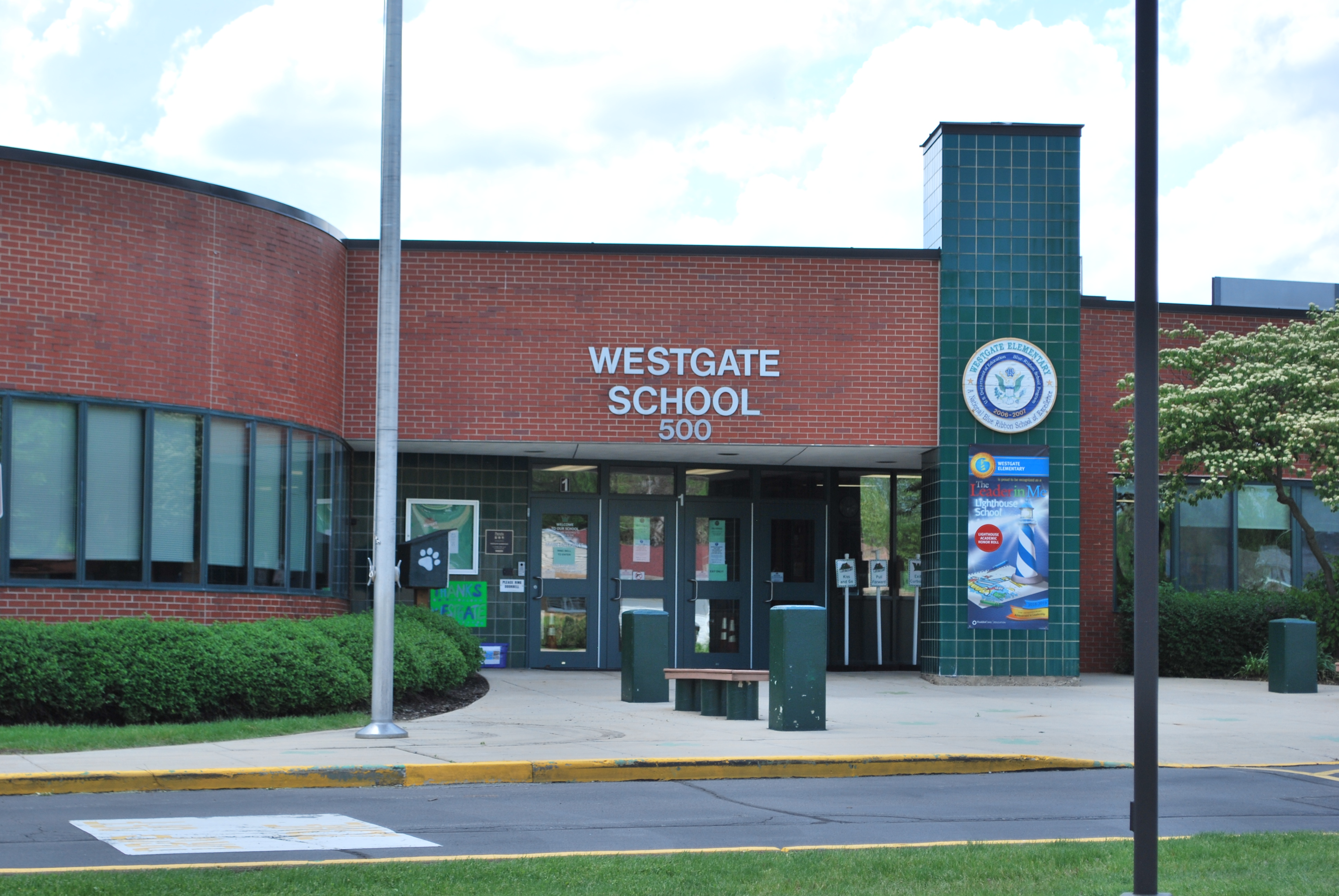
Westgate Elementary School

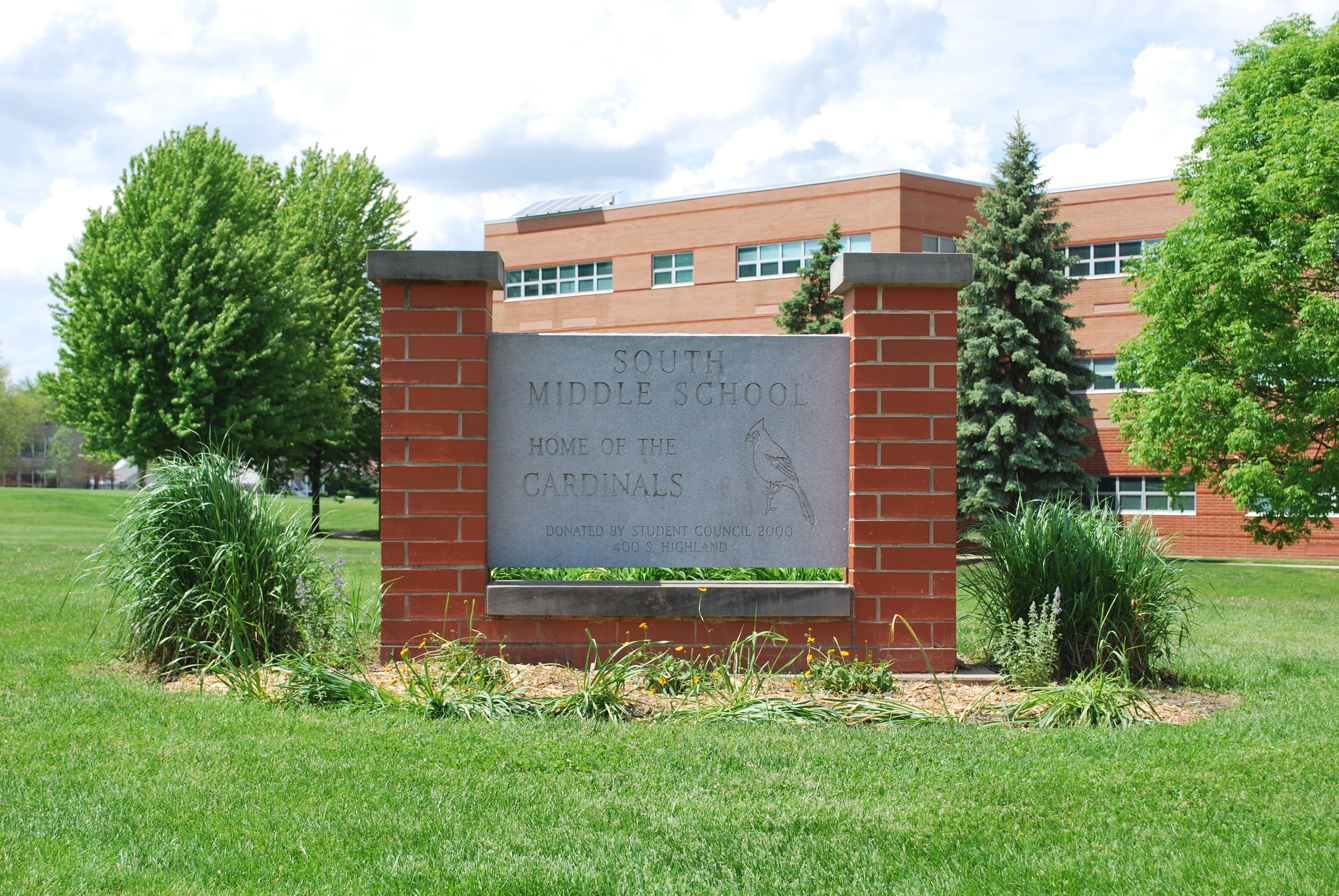
South Middle School

== Schools ==
The school district operates seven elementary schools and two middle schools.

School name	Lowest to Highest Grade	Number of Students	Principal	IRC Ranking
South Middle School	6th grade-8th grade	818	Dr. Jim Morrison	Commendable
Thomas Middle School	6th grade-8th grade	936	Lori Naumowicz	Commendable
Dryden Elementary School	Kindergarten-5th grade	440	Akemi Sessler	Commendable
Greenbrier Elementary School	Prekindergarten-5th grade	276.5	Donna Bingaman	Exemplary
Ivy Hill Elementary School	Kindergarten-5th grade	521	Scott Kaese	Exemplary
Olive-Mary Stitt School	Kindergarten-5th grade	569	Ms. Erin Davis	Commendable
Patton Elementary School	Kindergarten-5th grade	382.5	Mrs. Ellie Chin	Exemplary
Westgate Elementary School	Kindergarten-5th grade	511.5	Dr. Ann Buch	Exemplary
Windsor Elementary School	Kindergarten-5th grade	456.5	Mrs. Lindsay Anastacio	Commendable

Information based on 2013-14 Illinois Report Cards.

== Other information ==
=== Properties ===
- Seven Elementary Schools
- Two Middle Schools
- A leased private Japanese School
- A leased special education co-op
  - is also a maintenance facility for the districts vehicles.
- A district administration building

=== Historical Schools ===
- Dwyer Elementary (Closed in the 1970s)
- Wilson Elementary (Closed in 1977)
- Dunton Elementary (Closed in 1981, Now Administration Building)
- Park Elementary (Closed in 1981)
- Kensington Elementary (Closed in 1982)
- Rand Junior High (Closed in 1983)
- Miner Junior High (Closed in 1978)
- North School (Closed in 1976)
- North Arlington Middle School (Renamed To Thomas Middle School)
- Berkeley Elementary (Closed in 1992)

=== Administration ===
- Superintendent: Dr. Lori Bein
- Assistant Superintendent for Student Learning: Dr. Becky FitzPatrick
- Assistant Superintendent for Personnel And Planning: Mr. Brian Kaye
- Assistant Superintendent for Student Services: Dr. Peg Lasiewicki
- Assistant Superintendent for Business: Stacey Mallek
