= Lake Arlington (Illinois) =

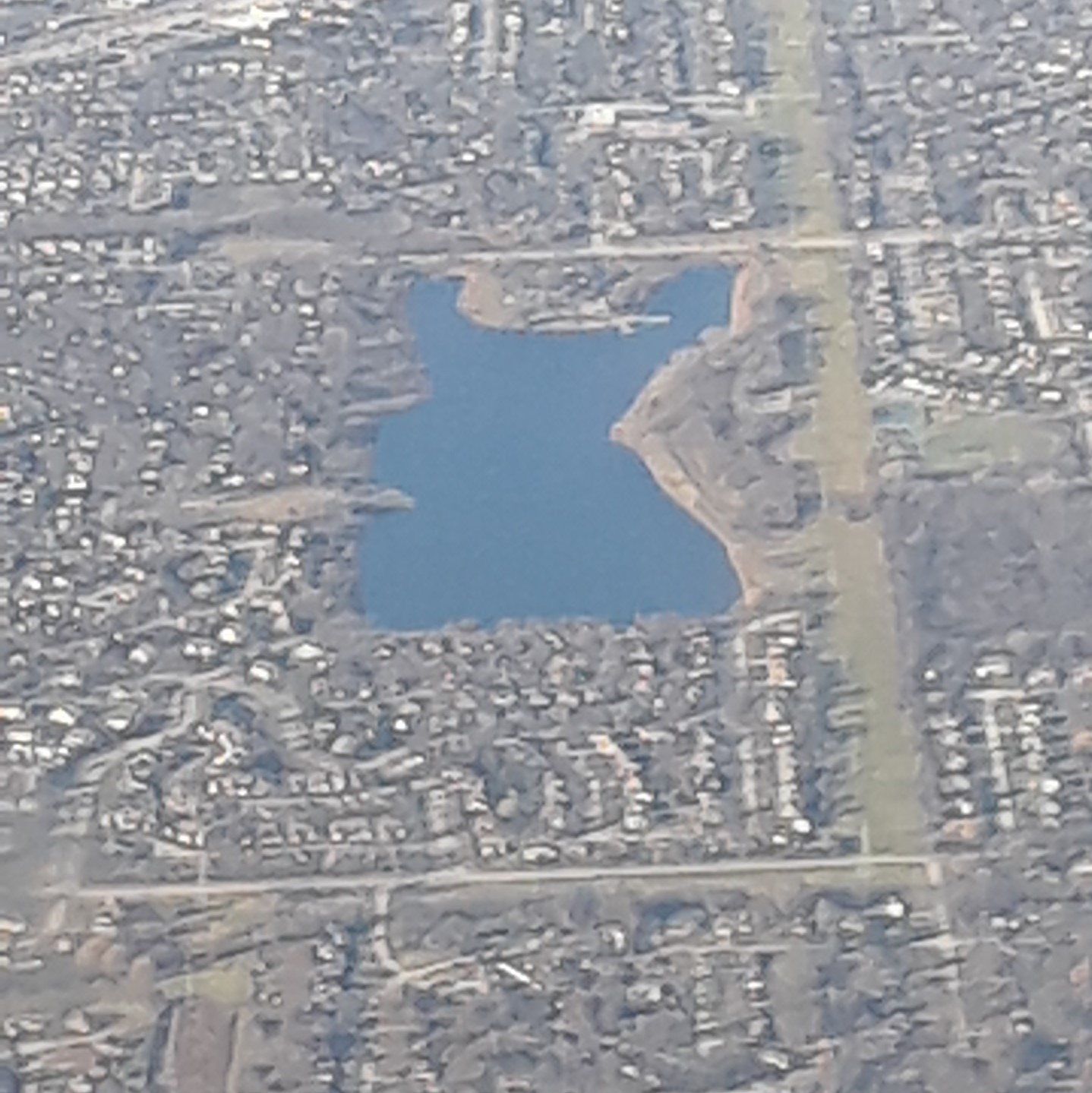
- Aerial shot of Lake Arlington

- Location within Illinois
- Location: Arlington Heights, Illinois
- Coordinates: 42°06′53″N 87°57′33″W
- Type: Human-made lake, detention lake
- Basin countries: United States of America
- Surface area: 50-acre (20 ha)

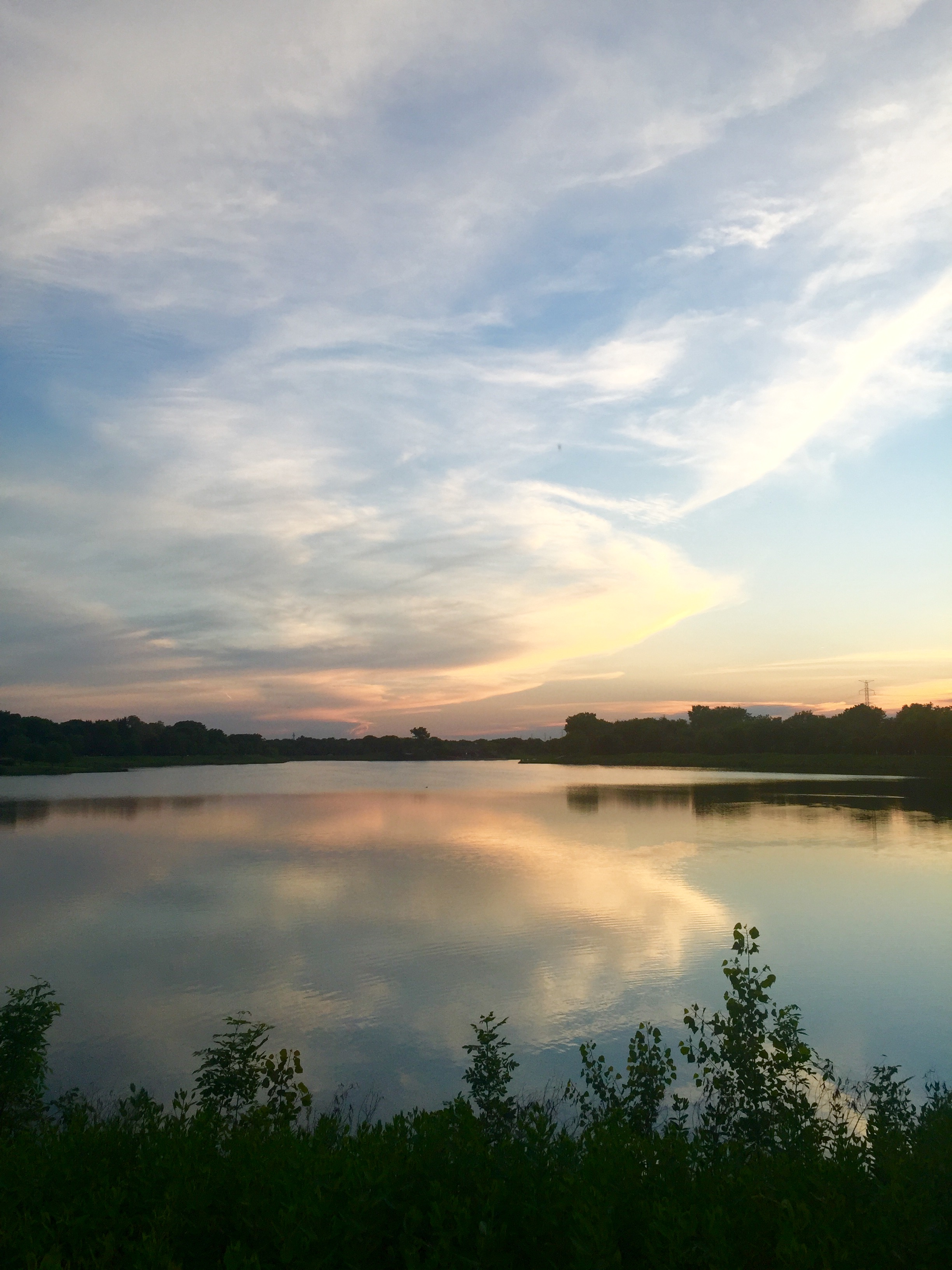
Lake Arlington at sunset

Lake Arlington is a human-made, 50-acre (20 ha) detention lake in the Chicago suburb of Arlington Heights, Illinois. The lake's average depth is between 5 and 7 feet (1.5 and 2.1 m).

== History ==
In the early 1980s, the land now containing Lake Arlington was purchased from local farmers by the Village of Arlington Heights for a sum of $2 million. With the goal of creating a stormwater detention basin for McDonald Creek, construction of the lake began in 1985. This project, costing Arlington Heights and surrounding suburbs $9 million, resulted in the 50 acres (20 ha) lake.

In 1990, the Arlington Heights Park District revealed plans to develop the land surrounding the lake into a park. On September 22, 1990, the land was ceremonially given to the park district by the village. According to the Chicago Tribune, the initial development plan was estimated to "cost about $1.75 million" and was to "include a lighted parking lot for 64 cars, boat docks and storage, a fishing dock, a bicycle path, and most likely a playground and a small building with a concession stand and washrooms." The park officially opened on June 6, 1992, and all phases of the project were completed by 1995.

== Facilities ==
Today, the lake and its surrounding land is located in a 93-acre park known collectively as Lake Arlington. Facilities include an exercise area, two playgrounds, a fishing pier, a 2.4 miles (3.9 km) walking and bike path, picnic areas, washrooms, a concession stand, and a boat dock. Canoes, rowboats, kayaks, crew boats, and sailboats can be stored in the boathouse, and sailboats and paddle-boats are available for rent during the summer and fall. While there is a small strip of sand along part of the lake, swimming and wading are not permitted.

== Wildlife ==
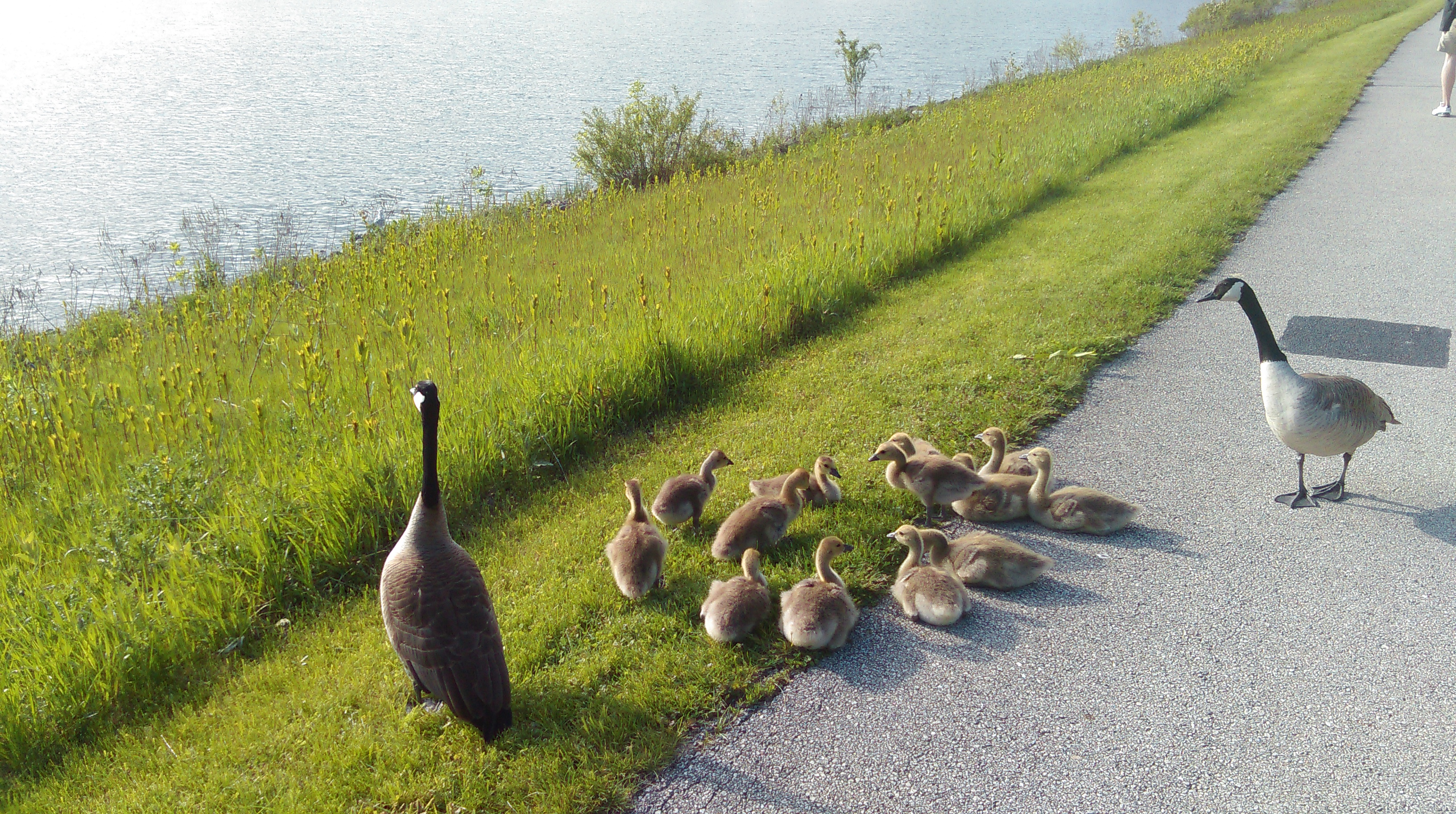
Family of Canada geese at Lake Arlington

Aside from the lake itself, Lake Arlington consists of wooded areas, tall-grass thickets, and 11 acres (4.5 ha) of wetland. The diversity of biomes within the park allow visitors to observe several species of native animals. Resident birds include the great blue heron, American herring gull, barn swallow, Canada goose, mallard, red-winged blackbird, sparrow, American robin, and common loon. The raccoon, eastern gray squirrel, and eastern cottontail can be found within the park. Additionally, bass, bluegills, catfish, carp, and gizzard shads swim in the lake's waters. Other semiaquatic animals include bullfrogs, turtles and muskrats.
