= Metropolis Performing Arts Centre =

Theatre company in Illinois, USA

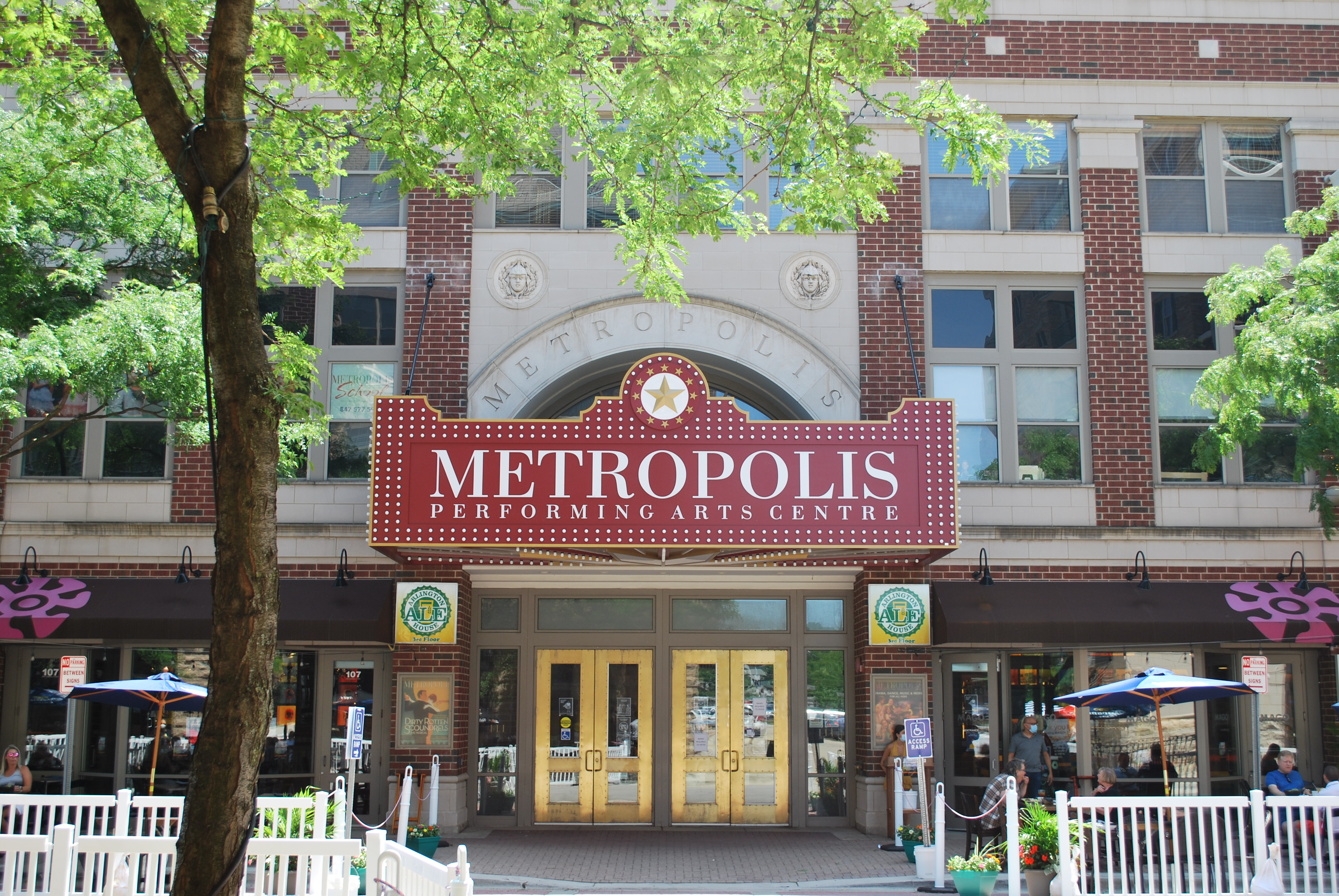
- Metropolis Performing Arts Centre Marquee/Front Entrance
- Formation: 2000
- Headquarters: 111 W Campbell St; Arlington Heights, Illinois
- Executive Director: Tiffany Gates
- Artistic Director: Johanna McKenzie Miller
- Website: www.metropolisarts.com

The Metropolis Performing Arts Centre is a professional theatre company in Arlington Heights, Illinois, founded in 2000. They often have over 300 performances of more than 40 different productions with over 70,000 patrons each season.

== List of shows ==
2004–2005

- Vagina Monologues
- Defending the Caveman
- Odd Couple
- A Midsummer Night's Dream
- Forever Plaid

2005–2006

- Beyond Therapy
- Steel Magnolias
- Run For Your Wife
- Brighton Beach Memoirs
- The Nerd

2006–2007

- I Love You, You're Perfect. Now Change
- Barefoot in the Park
- A Streetcar Named Desire
- Don't Dress for Dinner

2007–2008

- High School Musical
- Deathtrap
- Sylvia
- The Musical of Musicals the Musical

2008–2009

- Damn Yankees
- The Foreignor
- Lend Me A Tenor
- Baby

2009–2010

- Pump Boys and Dinettes
- Out of Order
- Side Man
- Midlife the Crisis Musical

2010–2011

- The 25th Annual Putnam County Spelling Bee
- The Boys Next Door
- The Butler Didn't
- Nunsense

2011–2012

- Married Alive!
- The Andrews Brothers
- The Complete History of America (Abridged)
- 10 Ways To Kill Your Husband

2012–2013

- The Marvelous Wonderettes
- A Christmas Carol
- There's a Girl in My Soup
- Accomplice
- Five Course Love

2013–2014

- Route 66
- The Last Five Years
- A Christmas Carol
- Greater Tuna
- Half and Half

2014–2015

- Laughter on the 23rd Floor
- Dial M for Murder
- A Christmas Carol
- Private Lives
- An Evening with C.S. Lewis
- Drowsy Chaperone

2015–2016

- Moon Over Buffalo
- Spamalot
- A Christmas Carol
- The 39 Steps
- Rent
- Ring of Fire

2016–2017

- Young Frankenstein
- Rosencrantz and Guildenstern are Dead
- Hair
- Peter and the Starcatcher

2017–2018

- Into the Woods
- Boeing Boeing
- Avenue Q
- Beehive: The 60's Musical

2018–2019

- A Chorus Line
- The Mousetrap
- A Funny Thing Happened on the Way to the Forum
- Buddy: The Buddy Holly Story

2019–2020

- Anything Goes
- Noises Off
- Baskerville: A Sherlock Holmes Mystery (virtual)

2021–2022

- Little Shop of Horrors
- My Way: A Musical Tribute to Frank Sinatra
- Legally Blonde
- A Christmas Carol
- Lady Day at Emerson’s Bar and Grill
- SHOUT! The Mod Musical
- Sister Act

2022–2023

- Cabaret
- A Christmas Carol
- The Legend of Georgia McBride
- Ragtime
- Xanadu

2023–2024

- The Addams Family
- A Christmas Carol
- The Music Man, In Concert
- 9 to 5
- Million Dollar Quartet

2024–2025

- Rodgers & Hammerstein's Cinderella
- A Christmas Carol
- The Importance of Being Earnest
- Rock of Ages
- Ken Ludwig's Dear Jack, Dear Louise
