= Arlington Heights, Illinois =

- Village
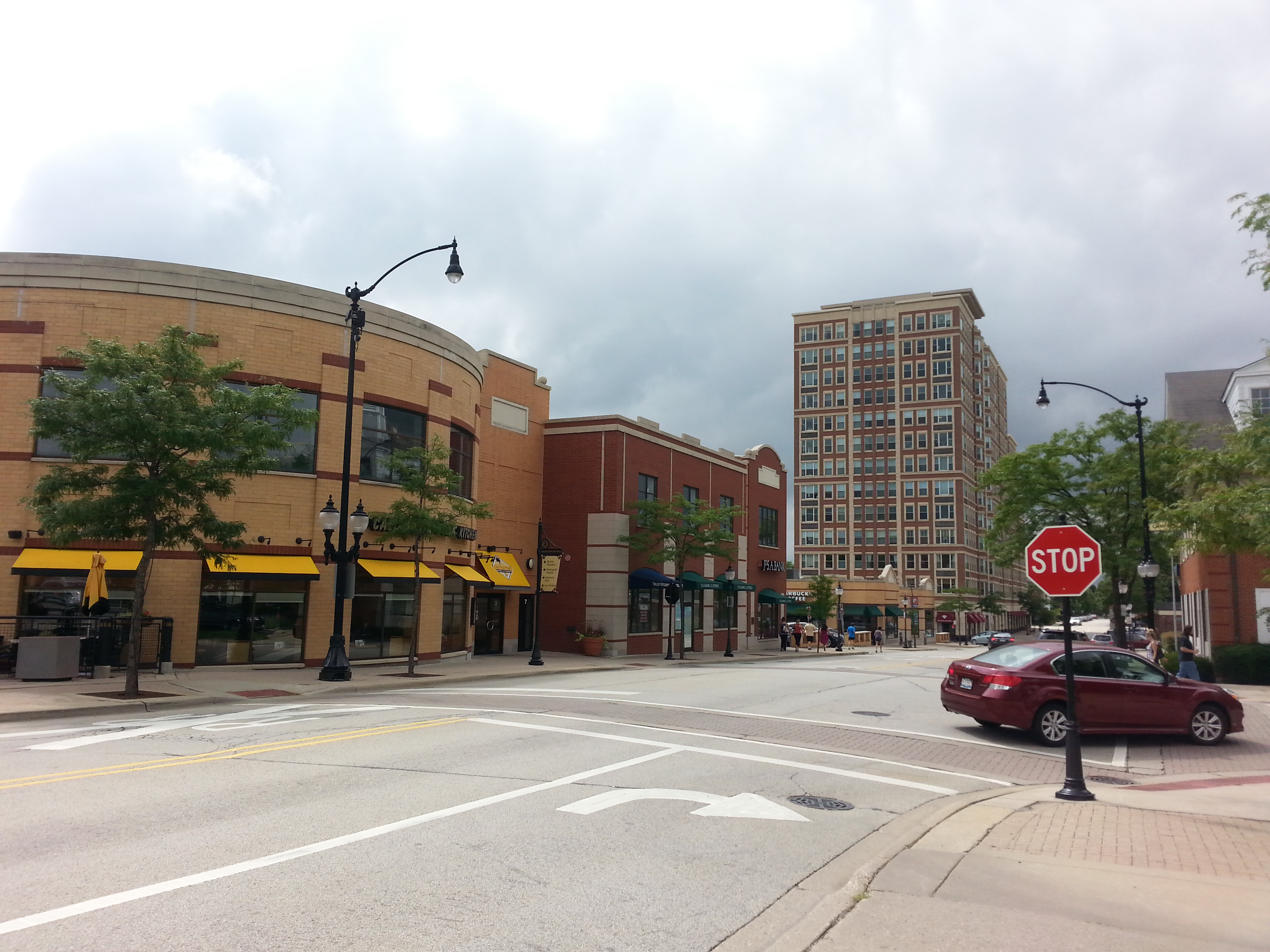
- Evergreen Avenue in Downtown Arlington Heights

- Flag Seal
- Nickname: Action Heights
- Motto: Village of Good Neighbors
- Interactive map of Arlington Heights, Illinois
- Location within Greater Chicago Location within Illinois Location within the United States
- Coordinates: 42°07′12″N 87°59′06″W
- Country: United States
- State: Illinois
- Counties: Cook
- Townships: Wheeling, Elk Grove, Palatine
- Incorporated: 1887

Government
  - Type: Council–manager

Area
  - Total: 16.64 sq mi (43.09 km^{2})
  - Land: 16.61 sq mi (43.01 km^{2})
  - Water: 0.031 sq mi (0.08 km^{2})
- Elevation: 712 ft (217 m)

Population (2020)
  - Total: 77,676
  - Estimate (2024): 75,596 ▼
  - Density: 4,678/sq mi (1,806.1/km^{2})
- Time zone: UTC-6 (CST)
  - Summer (DST): UTC-5 (CDT)
- ZIP Codes: 60004, 60005, and 60006 (PO boxes)
- Area codes: 847 and 224
- FIPS code: 17-02154
- GNIS feature ID: 2397986
- Website: vah.com

Arlington Heights is a village in Cook County, Illinois, United States. A northwestern suburb of Chicago, it lies about 25 miles (40 km) northwest of the city's downtown. As of the 2020 census, the village's population was 77,676, making it the 15th-most populous municipality in Illinois.

Arlington Heights is known for the former Arlington Park Race Track, home of the Arlington Million, a Breeders' Cup qualifying event; it also hosted the Breeders' Cup World Thoroughbred Championships in 2002.

== History ==
Arlington Heights lies mostly in the western part of Wheeling Township, with territory in adjacent Elk Grove and Palatine townships, in an area originally notable for the absence of groves and trees.

=== Indigenous settlements ===
The land that is now Arlington Heights was controlled by the Miami Confederacy (which contained the Illini and Kickapoo tribes) starting in the early 1680s. The Confederacy was driven from the area by the Iroquois and Meskwaki in the early 1700s.

The French-allied Potawatomi began to raid and take possession of Northern Illinois in the 1700s. In the late 1700s and early 1800s, the Potawatomi expanded southwards from their territory in Green Bay and westward from their holdings near Detroit, until they controlled in an L-shaped swath of territory from Green Bay to the Illinois River, and from the Mississippi River to the Maumee River.

Throughout the 1830s, the Potawatomi maintained a camp in modern-day Arlington Heights that was used for six weeks out of the year as the Potawatomi migrated from their summer encampments to their winter encampments.

In 1833, the Potawatomi signed the 1833 Treaty of Chicago with the United States Government. As a result of the Treaty, the United States was granted control of all land west of Lake Michigan and east of Lake Winnebago in exchange for a tract of land west of the Mississippi. The land that is now Arlington Heights was ceded to the U.S. in this treaty, which sparked mass white immigration to the Northern Illinois area. The U.S. Government purchased the land for about 15 cents per acre, and then resold it to white settlers for 1.25 dollars per acre.

The Potawatomi would occasionally return to their holdings in Northern Illinois to honor their buried ancestors, but these return visits ended as old villages and burial sites were destroyed by white settlers to make way for farming. Descendants of the Potawatomi who once inhabited the land that is now Arlington Heights currently live on a reservation in Mayetta, Kansas.

=== Establishment as West Wheeling and Dunton ===
Many prominent roads in the Arlington Heights area were built on top of Native American trails: Rand Road was built on top of a Native trail which passed by the property of Socrates Rand, who built a tavern near a crossing on the Des Plaines River. Arlington Heights Road was developed from a Native trail that ran from what was once called Naper Settlement (now Naperville) to what was once called Indian Creek (now Half Day).

Around the same time, a trading post was established in the Southwest corner of the township by Frederick T. Miner, the cabins established near Miner's trading post came to be known as West Wheeling. In 1837, Asa Dunton, a settler who built one of the first cabins in what was then known as Deer Grove, registered three land claims for himself and two sons in the land in the west of Wheeling Township.

In 1845, Asa's eldest son, William Dunton, married Almeda Wood and brought her to the house he built beside the Potawatomi trail which then became known as Dunton's Road (and is now known as Arlington Heights Road). West Wheeling then became known as Dunton. The town's name changed several times before it officially became known as Arlington Heights in 1874.

William Dunton persuaded the Illinois & Wisconsin Railroad company to build track through his property. In 1853, Dunton sold 16 acres of his land to the company for $350. The first Dunton train station was built in 1854. The construction of the railroad helped to expand the population of Dunton, as it was easier for settlers to reach the village.

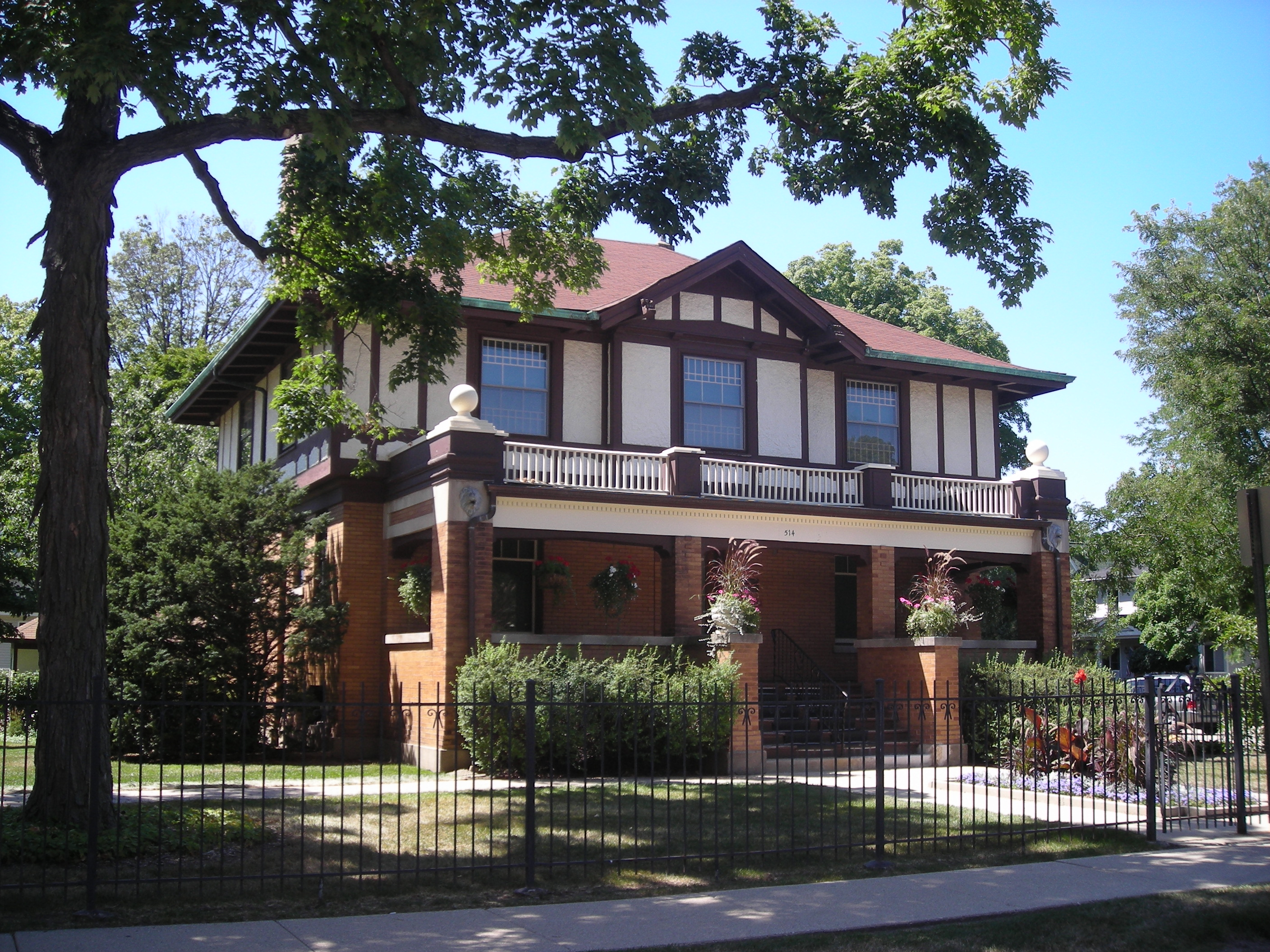
The Nathaniel Moore House is on the National Register of Historic Places.

By 1850, the area had largely changed its ethnic composition, as many German farmers from Saxony had arrived during the 1840s. John Klehm was a prominent German resident of Arlington Heights. Initially a potato farmer supplying the Chicago market, in 1856 he began a nursery for cherry, apple, and pear trees, later moving into spruce, maple, and elm, and then flowers. By the late 1850s the area had become noted for its truck farms, sending dairy products as well as vegetables to Chicago on the railroad.

=== Civil War era and after ===
Several Dunton residents served in the American Civil War, however only three of those residents who left for the war returned. One of the survivors, a recently naturalized Alsatian named Charles Sigwalt (namesake of Sigwalt Street), fought at the Battle of Chickamauga and the Battle of Kennesaw Mountain. Warren Kennicott (namesake of Kennicott Avenue) was killed in action at the Battle of Gettysburg.

During the 1860s, Arlington Heights was a stop for many Union soldiers travelling South to fight the Confederacy or traveling North to fight in the Dakota War of 1862. During and after the Civil War, the Chicago metropolitan area experienced a population boom. Dunton continued to slowly grow, in part because of an influx of German immigration. By the 1870s, Dunton's population had surpassed 1,200. By this time, the village had acquired a blacksmith, a cheese factory, a hardware store, and a hotel.

Balaam Lee was the first Black person to live in Dunton. He was a formerly enslaved man who followed a returning Union soldier from the Civil War to Dunton in the 1860s. He was born in the 1830s and died in 1894. In Dunton/Arlington Heights, he worked at Klehm's Nursery and also as a mule driver.

In 1874, Dunton's name was officially changed to Arlington Heights. In 1878, Civil War veteran Charles Sigwalt and his brother John founded the Sigwalt Sewing Machine Company, which made 40,000 machines from the period of 1878 to 1883. The company was destroyed by a fire in 1895.

Two of Arlington Heights' first Black residents were Fannie White (1856–1946), an artist, and her husband Frank White (1862–1953), a barber shop owner. They moved to Arlington Heights in 1888 and lived on Dunton Avenue until Fannie's death. In 1894, Arlington Heights' first fire department formed during the tenure of Mayor Charles Sigwalt. Frank White was a charter member of the fire department and he also was elected its first President. He was involved with the fire department for 40 years, serving as a historian.

Arlington Heights was an early commuter suburb. The town developed religious institutions that reflected the origins of its citizens. The first churches were Presbyterian (1855) and Methodist (1858), with St. Peter Lutheran Church, a German Lutheran church, following in 1860. Today, the village has many Roman Catholics, boasting three very large churches: St. James (founded 1902—now home to 4,600 registered families), St. Edna (2,800 registered families), and Our Lady of the Wayside (3,100 registered households). In addition, there are several Lutheran and evangelical churches, along with congregations that are members of the United Churches of Christ, Episcopal Church, and Christian Church (Disciples of Christ).

=== 20th century to present ===
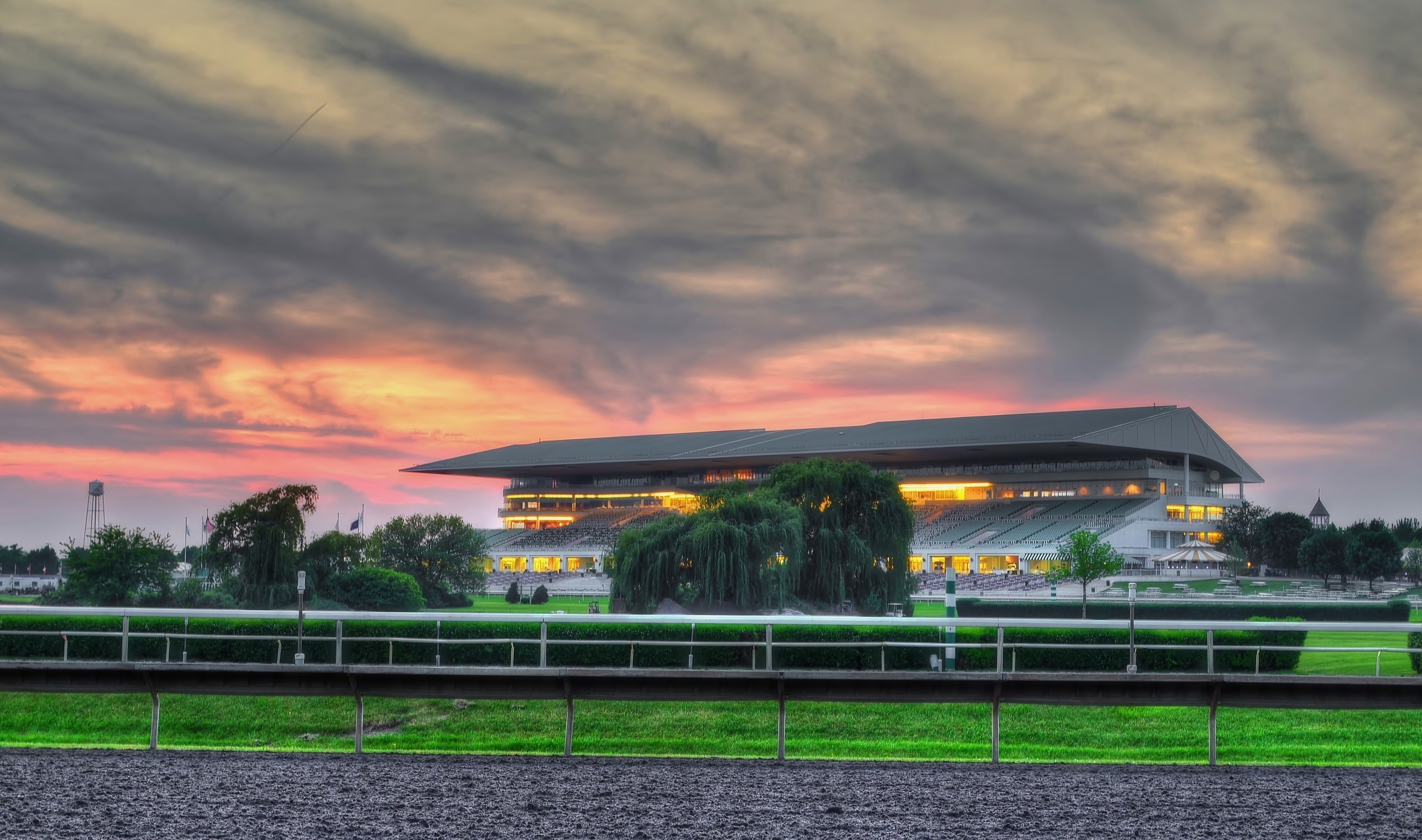
Grandstand at Arlington Park Race Track

By the start of the 20th century, Arlington Heights had about 1,400 inhabitants. The village continued to grow slowly with the area primarily being farms and greenhouses until after World War II. By then Arlington Heights was also known for Arlington Park, a racetrack founded in 1927 by the California millionaire Harry D. "Curly" Brown upon land formerly consisting of 12 farms. Camp McDonald and two country clubs were founded in the 1930s. On July 31, 1985, a fire burned down the grandstand. A six-story grandstand was completed and opened for use June 28, 1989.

A population explosion took place in Arlington Heights in the 1950s and 1960s. The growth of automobile ownership, together with the expansion of the Chicago-area economy, the baby boom, and white flight from the city, drove the number of people in the suburb (geographically expanded by a series of annexations) up to 64,884 by 1970. By then virtually all the available land had been taken up by urban sprawl, and the formerly isolated depot stop found itself part of a continuous built-up area stretching from Lake Michigan to the Fox River.

Village of Arlington Heights v. Metropolitan Housing Development Corp., 429 U.S. 252 (1977), was a United States Supreme Court case about housing discrimination. The case involved an Arlington Heights zoning board decision denying a zoning variance to build a multi-family housing complex on property owned by the Clerics of St. Viator near Saint Viator High School. The Village argued that the zoning board blocked construction to "protect property values and the integrity of the Village's zoning plan," which only allowed single-family homes in the neighborhood. The developer argued that the intent and practical effect of preventing the development was to maintain racial segregation. The Court held that the ordinance was constitutional because there was no proof that "discriminatory purpose was a motivating factor in the Village's decision."

== Geography ==
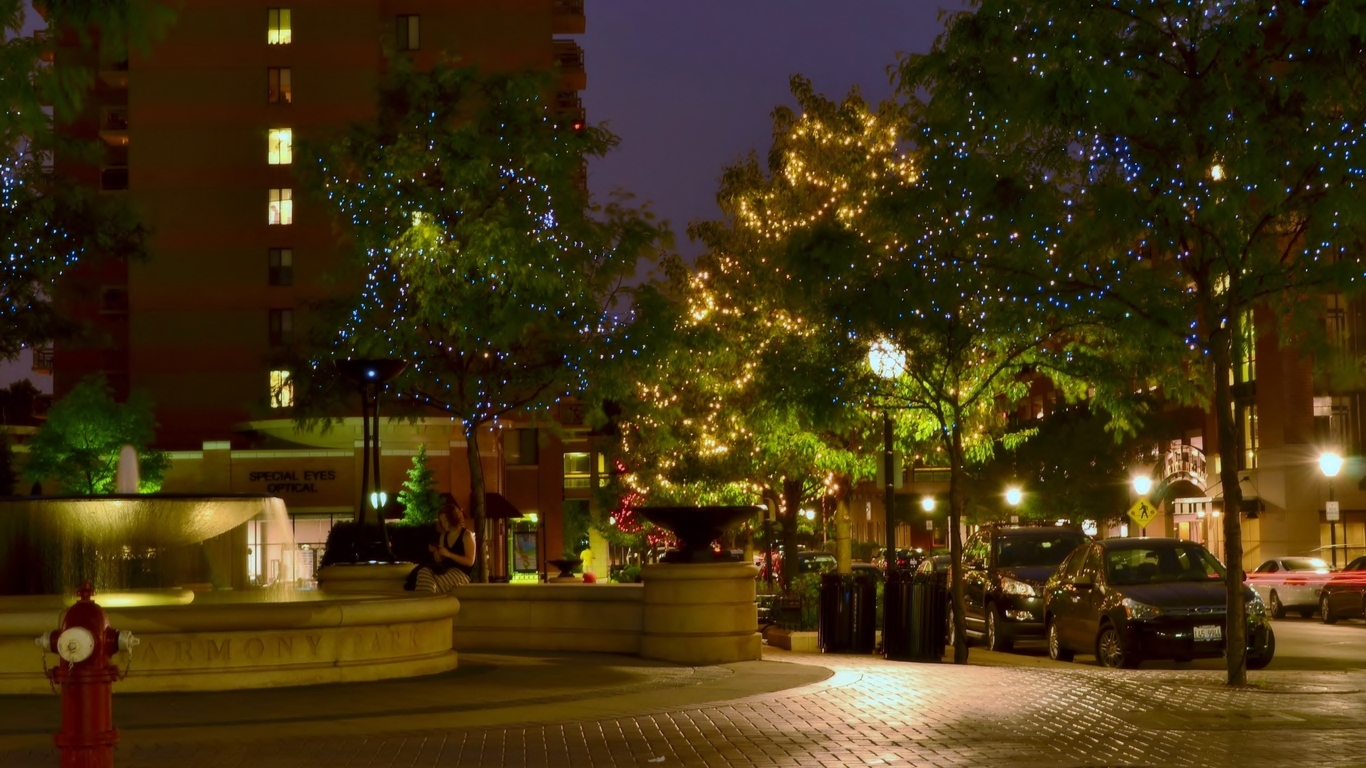
Harmony Park in downtown Arlington Heights

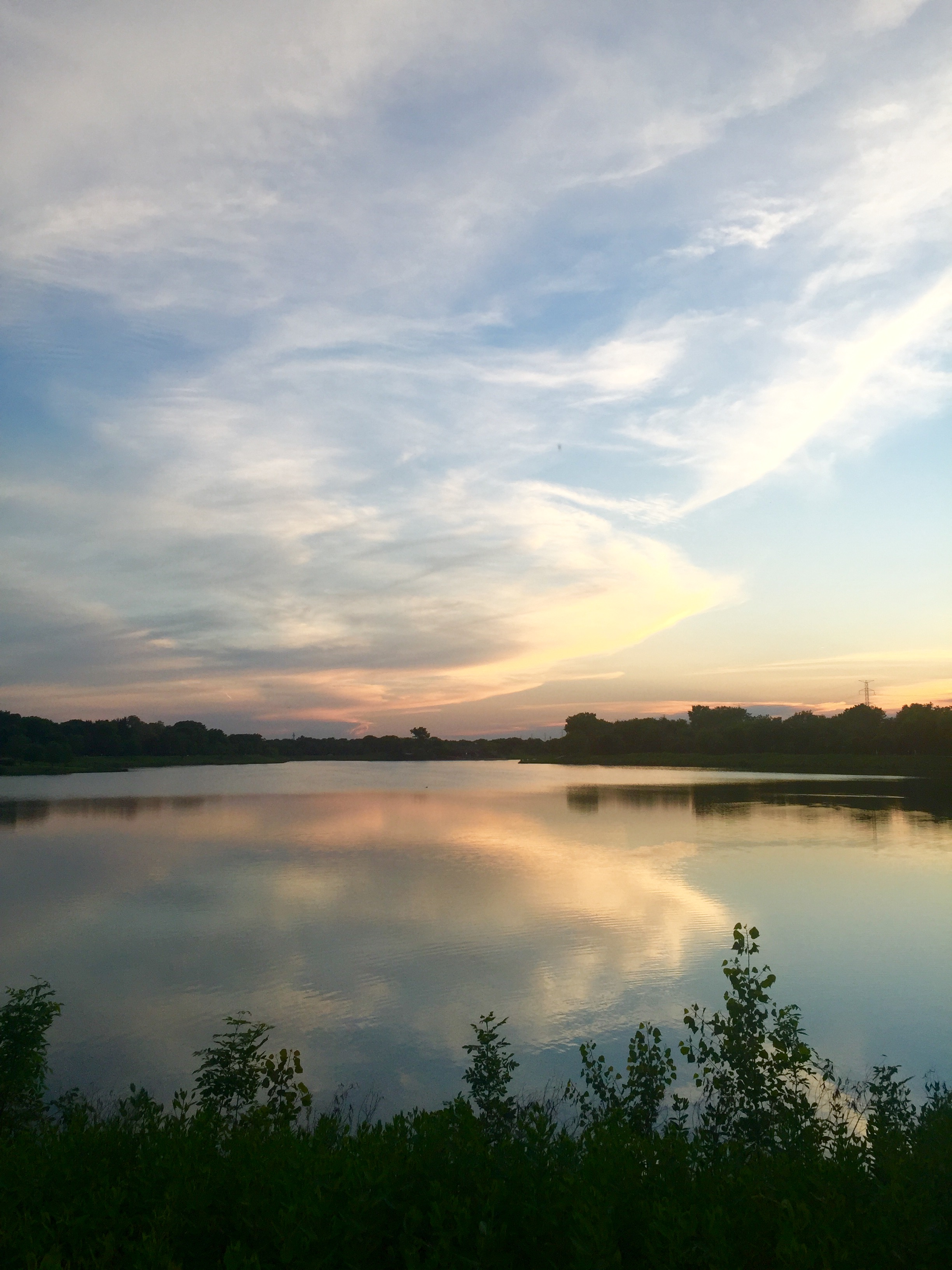
Lake Arlington at sunset

According to the 2021 census gazetteer files, Arlington Heights has a total area of 16.64 square miles (43.10 km^{2}), of which 16.61 square miles (43.02 km^{2}) (or 99.81%) is land and 0.03 square miles (0.08 km^{2}) (or 0.19%) is water. Located primarily in Cook County, a portion extends into neighboring Lake County.

=== Climate ===
Arlington Heights is in the hot-summer humid continental climate, or Köppen Dfa zone. The zone includes four distinct seasons. Winter is cold with snow. Spring warms up with precipitation and storms. Summer has high precipitation and storms. Fall cools down.

Climate data for Arlington Heights, Illinois
Month	Jan	Feb	Mar	Apr	May	Jun	Jul	Aug	Sep	Oct	Nov	Dec	Year
Record high °F (°C)	67 (19)	75 (24)	87 (31)	91 (33)	98 (37)	104 (40)	105 (41)	101 (38)	101 (38)	94 (34)	81 (27)	71 (22)	105 (41)
Mean daily maximum °F (°C)	28 (−2)	33 (1)	44 (7)	57 (14)	68 (20)	78 (26)	82 (28)	79 (26)	72 (22)	60 (16)	47 (8)	33 (1)	57 (14)
Daily mean °F (°C)	21 (−6)	25 (−4)	35 (2)	48 (9)	58 (14)	68 (20)	73 (23)	70 (21)	62 (17)	51 (11)	39 (4)	26 (−3)	48 (9)
Mean daily minimum °F (°C)	13 (−11)	17 (−8)	26 (−3)	38 (3)	48 (9)	58 (14)	63 (17)	61 (16)	52 (11)	41 (5)	30 (−1)	18 (−8)	39 (4)
Record low °F (°C)	−26 (−32)	−21 (−29)	−9 (−23)	5 (−15)	22 (−6)	35 (2)	38 (3)	38 (3)	25 (−4)	14 (−10)	−10 (−23)	−20 (−29)	−26 (−32)
Average precipitation inches (mm)	1.90 (48)	1.97 (50)	2.29 (58)	3.56 (90)	4.24 (108)	3.85 (98)	3.78 (96)	4.86 (123)	3.40 (86)	3.10 (79)	3.04 (77)	2.26 (57)	38.25 (970)
Source: weather.com

== Demographics ==
Historical population
Census	Pop.	Note	%±
1890	1,424		—
1900	1,380		−3.1%
1910	1,943		40.8%
1920	2,250		15.8%
1930	4,997		122.1%
1940	5,668		13.4%
1950	8,768		54.7%
1960	27,878		218.0%
1970	65,058		133.4%
1980	66,116		1.6%
1990	75,460		14.1%
2000	76,031		0.8%
2010	75,101		−1.2%
2020	77,676		3.4%
U.S. Decennial Census; 2010 2020

=== Racial and ethnic composition ===
Arlington Heights village, Illinois – Racial and ethnic composition Note: the US Census treats Hispanic/Latino as an ethnic category. This table excludes Latinos from the racial categories and assigns them to a separate category. Hispanics/Latinos may be of any race.
Race / Ethnicity (NH = Non-Hispanic)	Pop 2000	Pop 2010	Pop 2020	% 2000	% 2010	% 2020
White alone (NH)	66,612	63,532	60,333	87.61%	84.60%	77.67%
Black or African American alone (NH)	706	936	1,195	0.93%	1.25%	1.54%
Native American or Alaska Native alone (NH)	35	48	56	0.05%	0.06%	0.07%
Asian alone (NH)	4,534	5,320	8,323	5.96%	7.08%	10.72%
Native Hawaiian or Pacific Islander alone (NH)	22	7	14	0.03%	0.01%	0.02%
Other race alone (NH)	68	72	207	0.09%	0.10%	0.27%
Mixed race or Multiracial (NH)	661	880	2,160	0.87%	1.17%	2.78%
Hispanic or Latino (any race)	3,393	4,306	5,388	4.46%	5.73%	6.94%
Total	76,031	75,101	77,676	100.00%	100.00%	100.00%

=== 2020 census ===
As of the 2020 census, Arlington Heights had a population of 77,676 people. The median age was 43.0 years. 21.3% of residents were under the age of 18 and 20.0% of residents were 65 years of age or older. For every 100 females there were 93.5 males, and for every 100 females age 18 and over there were 90.5 males age 18 and over.

100.0% of residents lived in urban areas, while 0.0% lived in rural areas.

The population density was 4,669.15 inhabitants per square mile (1,802.77/km^{2}). There were 33,356 housing units at an average density of 2,005.05 per square mile (774.15/km^{2}). Of all housing units, 4.7% were vacant. The homeowner vacancy rate was 1.2% and the rental vacancy rate was 7.6%.

There were 31,782 households and 19,988 families in Arlington Heights. Of those households, 29.0% had children under the age of 18 living in them. 55.4% were married-couple households, 15.2% were households with a male householder and no spouse or partner present, and 25.3% were households with a female householder and no spouse or partner present. About 29.8% of all households were made up of individuals and 14.3% had someone living alone who was 65 years of age or older.

The median income for a household in the village was $100,221, and the median income for a family was $126,753. Males had a median income of $71,416 versus $51,319 for females. The per capita income for the village was $51,340. About 2.6% of families and 4.2% of the population were below the poverty line, including 1.6% of those under age 18 and 8.5% of those age 65 or over.

=== Retirement communities ===
Retirement communities and nursing homes in Arlington Heights include Luther Village, The Moorings, Church Creek, Cedar Village, Lutheran Home, New Summit Rehabilitation and Healthcare, Mariella of Arlington Heights, Waverly Inn Memory Care and Cottages, Linden Place Apartments, and ManorCare at Arlington Heights.

== Economy ==
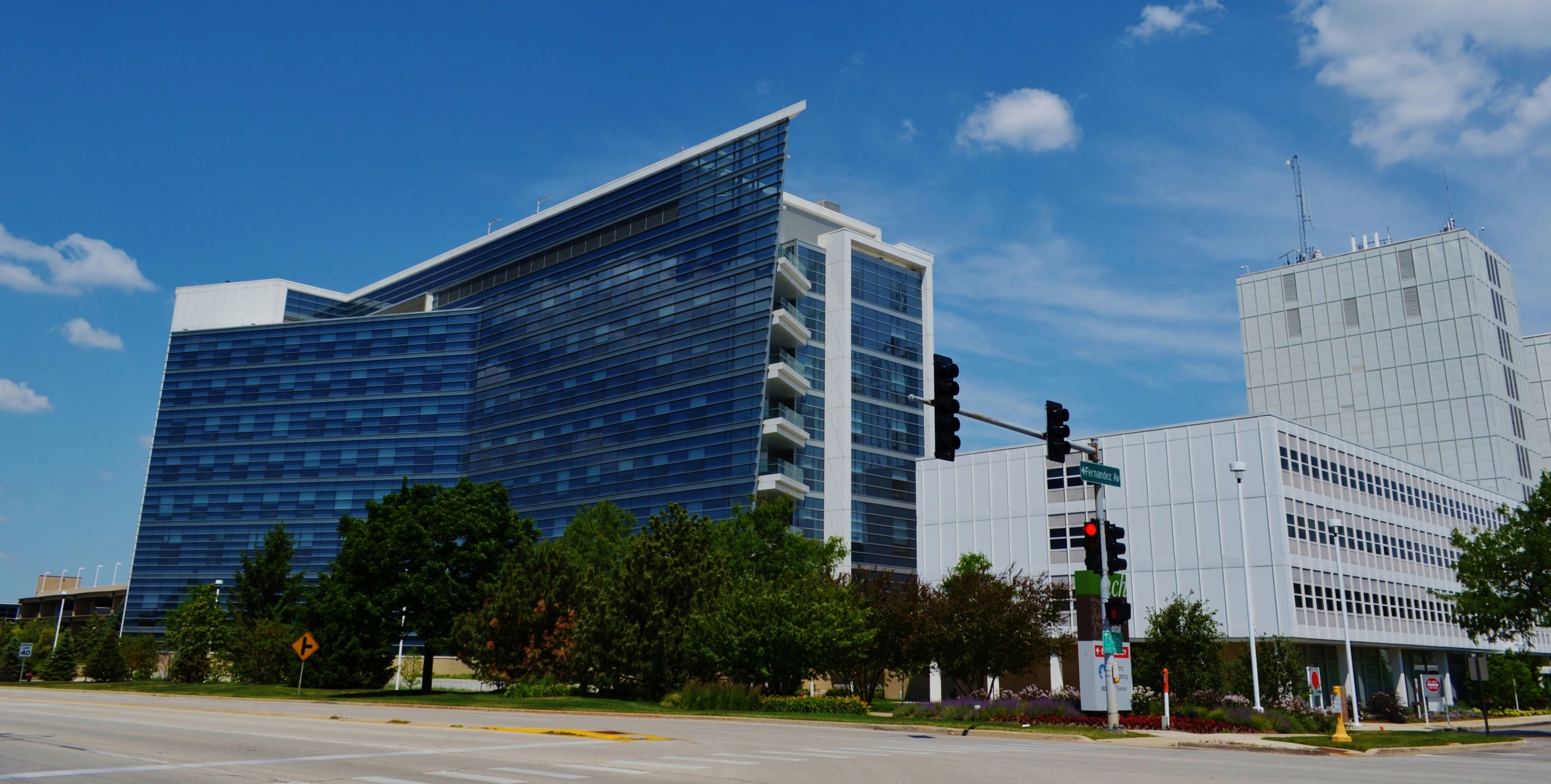
Endeavor Health Northwest Community Hospital

According to the Village's 2017 Comprehensive Annual Financial Report, the top employers in the city are:

#	Employer	# of Employees
1	Arlington International Racecourse (seasonal)	4,500
2	Northwest Community Healthcare	3,600
3	Arlington Heights High School District#214	1,700
4	Clearbrook	1,500
5	Lutheran Home	800
6	Paddock Publications	500
7	Alexian Brothers Health System	500
8	Clearbrook	450
9	Kroeschell Inc.	450
10	Village of Arlington Heights	450

== Arts and culture ==
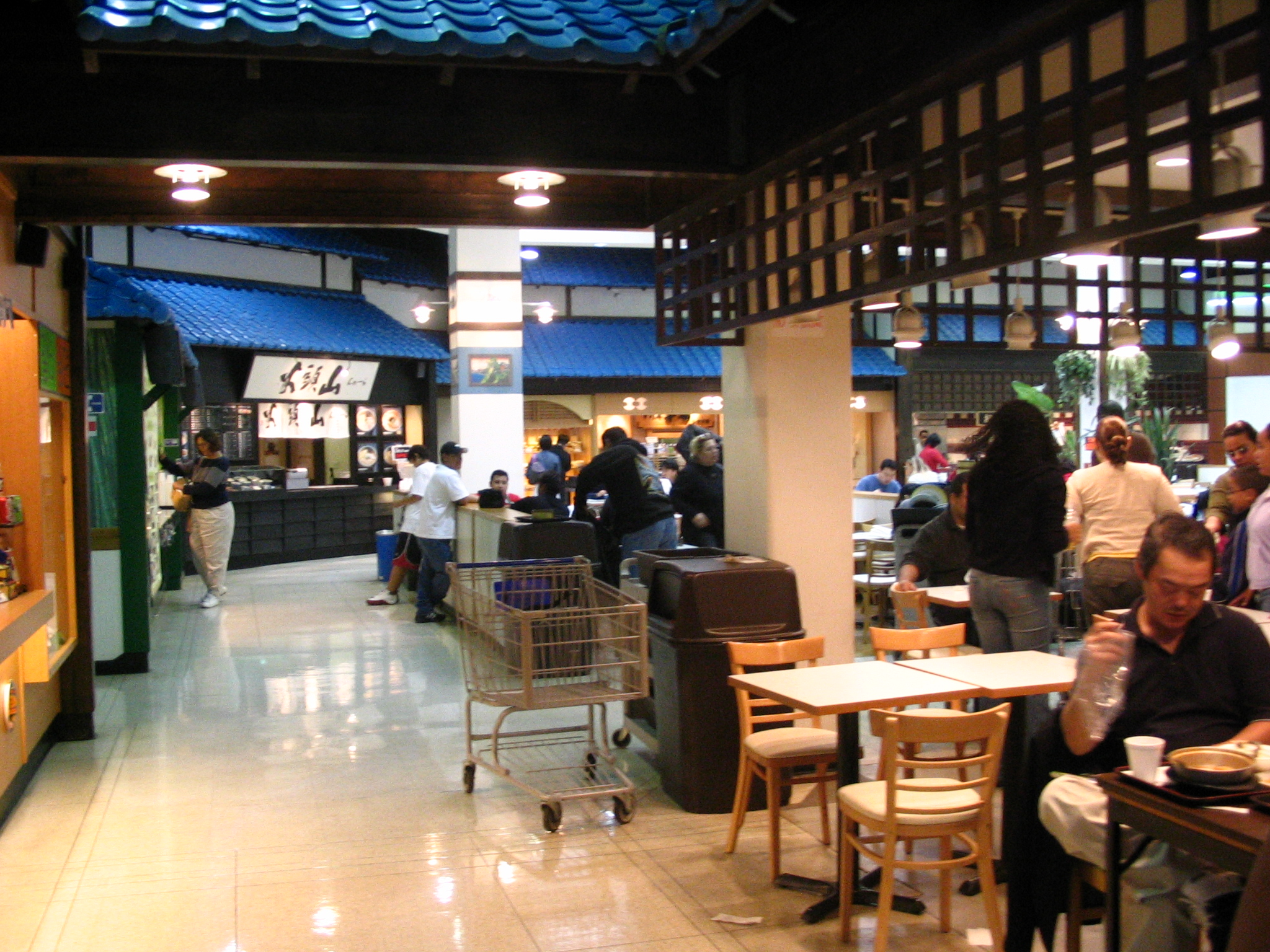
Food court of Mitsuwa Marketplace, the largest Japanese supermarket in the Midwestern United States.

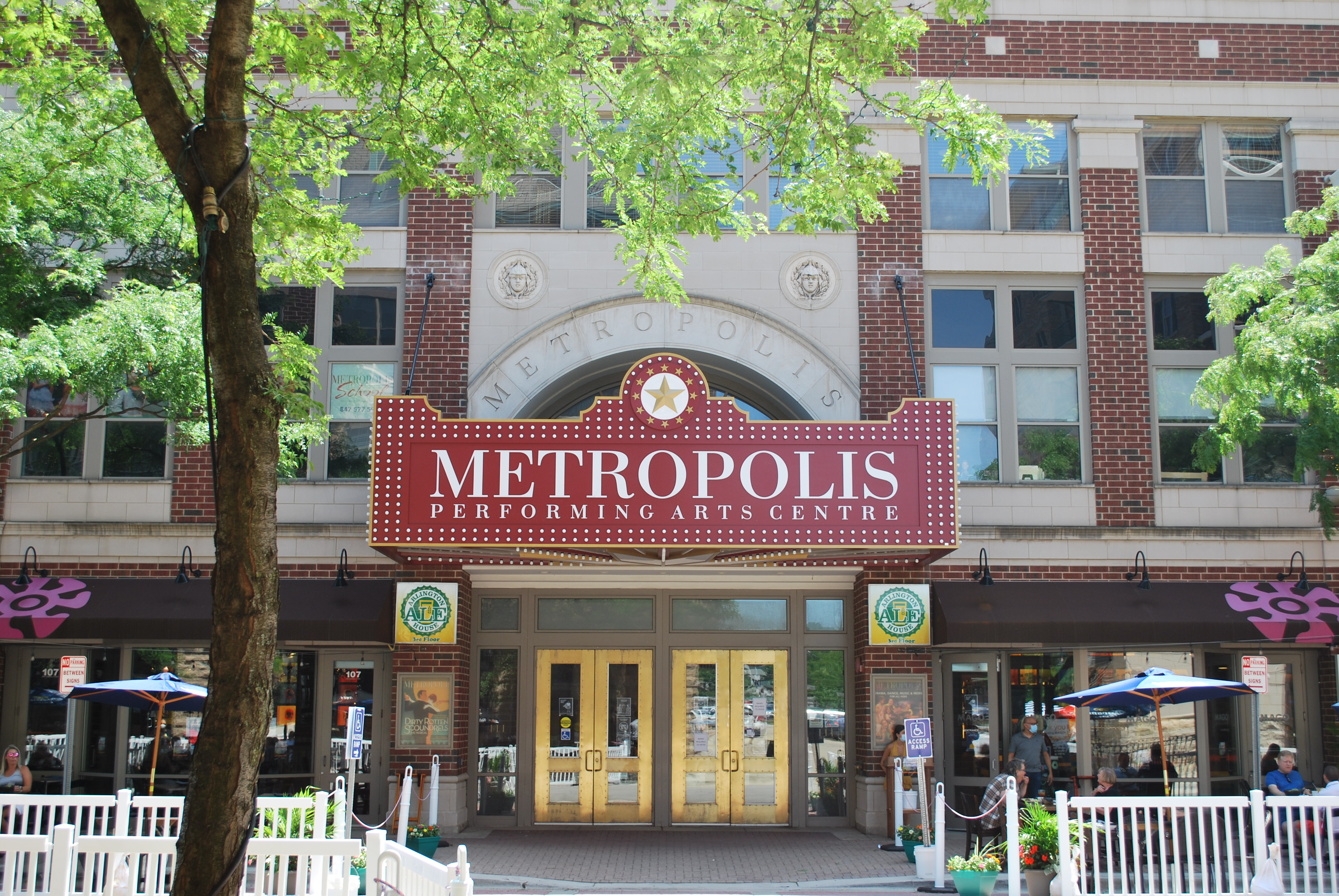
Metropolis Performing Arts Center in downtown Arlington Heights

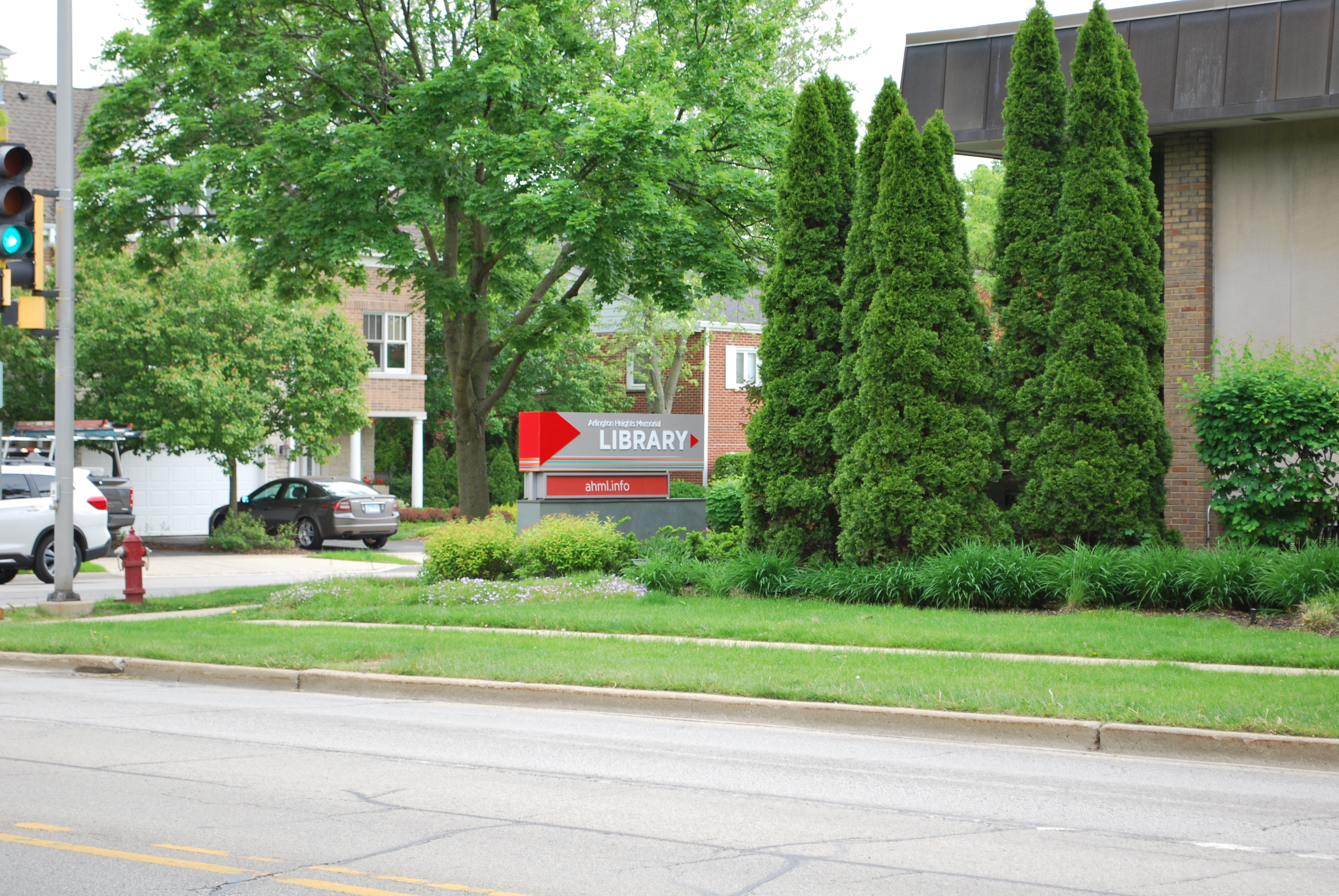
Arlington Heights Memorial Library

Arlington Park is a racetrack founded in 1927. On July 31, 1985, a fire burned down the grandstand. A six-story grandstand was completed and opened for use June 28, 1989. In February 2021, the track's owners, Churchill Downs Inc., announced that they would sell the site for redevelopment. In June 2021, the Chicago Bears emerged as prospective buyers of Arlington Park, raising speculation that they would leave Soldier Field (their current home stadium in downtown Chicago) and build a new stadium on the site. On September 29, 2021, the Bears and Churchill Downs reached a $197.2 million purchase and sell agreement for the property where the new stadium would be built. In September 2025, the Bears confirmed that their new stadium is planned for Arlington Heights.

Lake Arlington is a human-made, 50-acre (20 ha) detention lake in Arlington Heights. the lake and its surrounding land is located in a 93-acre park known collectively as Lake Arlington. Aside from the lake itself, Lake Arlington consists of wooded areas, tall-grass thickets, and 11 acres (4.5 ha) of wetland.

Arlington Heights is home to the only Mitsuwa Marketplace in the Midwestern United States, the largest Japanese supermarket in the Midwestern United States.

Entertainment venues include the Metropolis Performing Arts Centre in downtown Arlington Heights, which opened in 1999. The Metropolis Performing Arts Centre includes live entertainment as well as arts education. The facility includes a 350-seat theatre, ballroom and classrooms for music and theatre. Music venue Hey Nonny opened in 2018. From 1964 to 1970, Arlington Heights served as the home to The Cellar. The club was located in an unused warehouse on Davis Street, along the Chicago and Northwestern railroad tracks. Founded by local record store owner Paul Sampson, The Cellar offered live rock and blues bands for its mostly teenage audience to listen and to dance. It hosted a wealth of regional bands and repeat performers, such as The Shadows of Knight, The Mauds, H. P. Lovecraft, and Ted Nugent. It also hosted a significant array of national and international rock bands as well, including The Who, The Byrds, Buffalo Springfield, Cream, and The Spencer Davis Group.

The Arlington Heights Memorial Library is the public library in the village. According to the Institute of Museum & Library Services' Public Libraries Survey, in 2014, 63.5 percent of Arlington Heights residents (47,713 out of a service area population of 75,101) held library cards, entitling cardholders to borrowing privileges.

== Parks and recreation ==
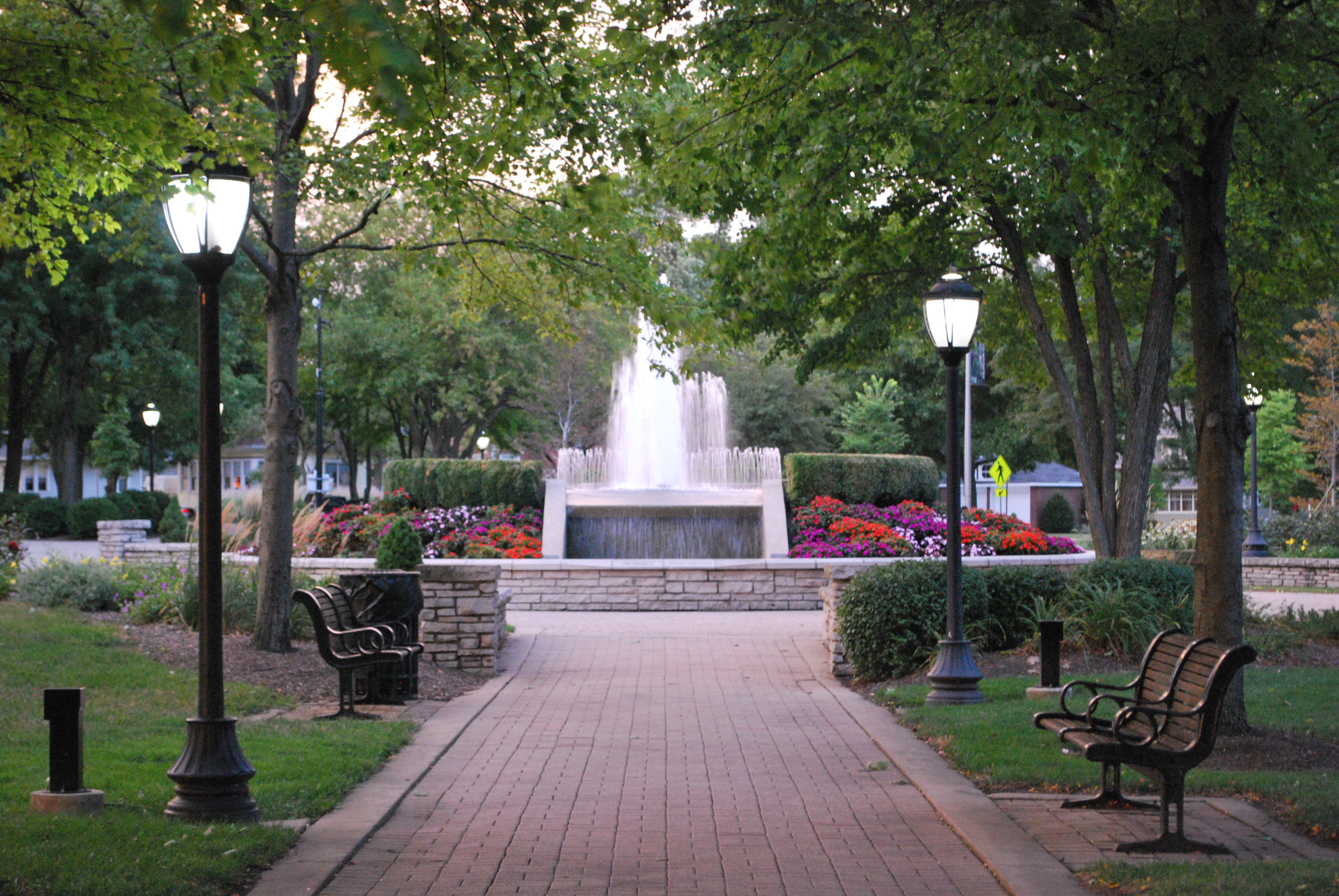
Virgil K. Horath Fountain at North School Park

The Arlington Heights Park District owns 456.53 acres (1.8 km^{2}) and leases an additional258.56 acres (1.0 km^{2}) across 58 parks. Its recreational facilities include community and recreation centers, swimming pools, athletic fields and courts, golf courses, a cultural arts center, historical museum, senior center, and facilities for tennis, pickleball, ice skating, and other sports. The district also maintains walking and biking paths, including a 1.8-mile (2.9 km) path around Lake Arlington, which encompasses a 50 acres (200,000 m^{2}) boating lake. Almost all of Arlington Heights is within the park district's service area, although Arlington Park is not part of the district.

Seasonally, Recreation Park in Arlington Heights hosts "Frontier Days" in the days leading up to Independence Day in early July and sometimes late June, hosting a carnival, parade, food, and concerts. During the winter holiday season, North School Park hosts a holiday display.

== Education ==
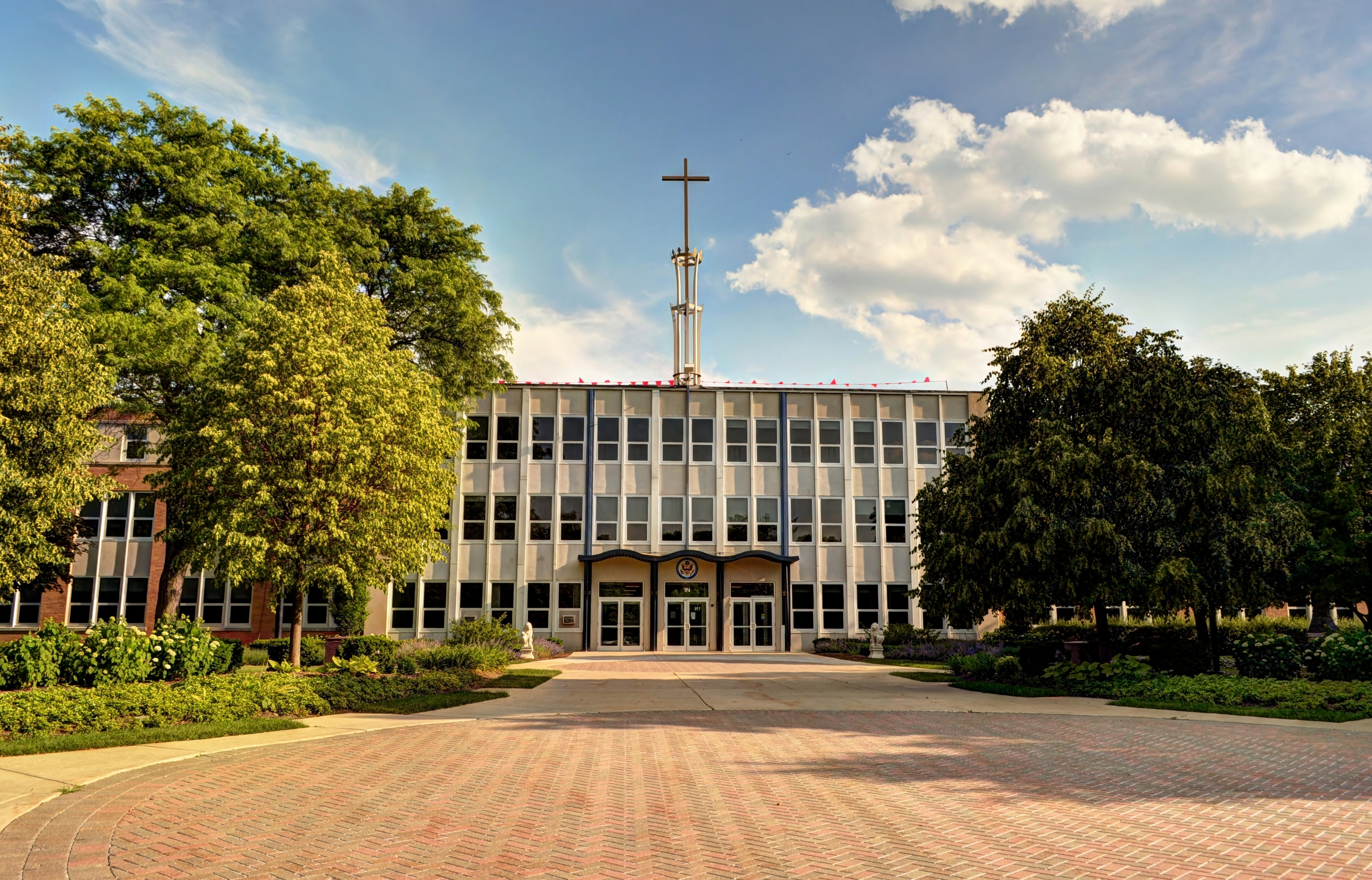
St. Viator High School

Public elementary schools and middle schools that serve most of the city are operated by Arlington Heights School District 25. Portions of the city are also served by Prospect Heights School District 23, Wheeling School District 21, Community Consolidated School District 59 and Community Consolidated School District 15. Seventeen elementary schools and nine middle schools serve sections of Arlington Heights.

Public high schools serving most of the community are operated by Township High School District 214. There is one public high school in the city, John Hersey High School. Other District 214 high schools serving sections of the city are: Buffalo Grove, Prospect, Rolling Meadows, and Wheeling. Portions of the city are also served by Palatine High School (Palatine, Illinois) in Township High School District 211. During peak enrollment from the 1960s to the 1980s, there were three public high schools in Arlington Heights: Hersey, Arlington High School, and Forest View High School.

Arlington High School was the original high school founded in 1922, but was closed in 1984, and is now the private Christian Liberty Academy. Forest View High School was closed in 1986, but serves as the administration center for the district. Today Arlington Heights high school students attend Rolling Meadows High School, Prospect High School, John Hersey High School and Buffalo Grove High School, with small portions attending Wheeling High School, Elk Grove High School, and Palatine High School (Palatine, Illinois).

Forest View Educational Center, the site of the former Forest View High School is in Arlington Heights and is operated by District 214. Forest View Educational Center is home to 5 programs in its specialized schools, including The Academy at Forest View, International Newcomer Academy, the LIFE program, Vanguard School, and the Young Adult Program.

Public elementary schools located in the Village include Dryden (D25), Greenbrier (D25), Ivy Hill (D25), Olive Mary Stitt (D25), Patton (D25), Westgate (D25), Windsor (D25), Juliette Low (D59), Poe (D21), and Riley (D21). Portions of the Village are also served by Fairview (D57), Forest View Elementary (D59), Lake Louise (D15), Longfellow (SD21), Dwight D. Eisenhower Elementary School (D23), Betsy Ross (D23), Ann Sullivan (D23), Willow Bend (D15), and Winston School (D15).

Public Middle schools located in the Village include South Middle School (SD25), and Thomas Middle School (SD25). Portions of the Village are also served by Carl Sandburg (CCSD 15), Cooper (CCSD21), MacArthur Middle School (SD23), Holmes Jr. High (CCSD59), Lincoln (SD 57), London (CCSD21), and Walter R. Sundling (CCSD 15)

There are also several private schools in Arlington Heights, such as St. Viator High School, Our Lady of Wayside School, St. James School, St. Peter Lutheran School and Christian Liberty Academy. Chicago Futabakai Japanese School, which offers day classes for Japanese students as well as weekend supplemental instruction, is located in Arlington Heights, in a former middle school. It moved there from Niles in 1998.

Harper College is located in neighboring Palatine, but all of Arlington Heights is within the boundaries of Community College District 512, which serves Harper College and Arlington Heights residents are eligible to be considered resident students for tuition purposes. Roosevelt University (which acquired the former Robert Morris University through a merger), while based primarily in Chicago and Schaumburg, has one athletic facility in Arlington Heights at the site of the former Forest View High School.

Arlington Heights School District 25, the Arlington Heights Park District, multiple churches, and also multiple private daycares offer preschool programs.

== Media ==
- The Daily Herald, the major locally owned and operated newspaper for Arlington Heights and many other Chicago suburbs
- Journal & Topics, covering Arlington Heights, Buffalo Grove, Palatine, Rolling Meadows, and Wheeling.
- The Correspondent, student newspaper of John Hersey High School.

== Infrastructure ==
=== Transportation ===
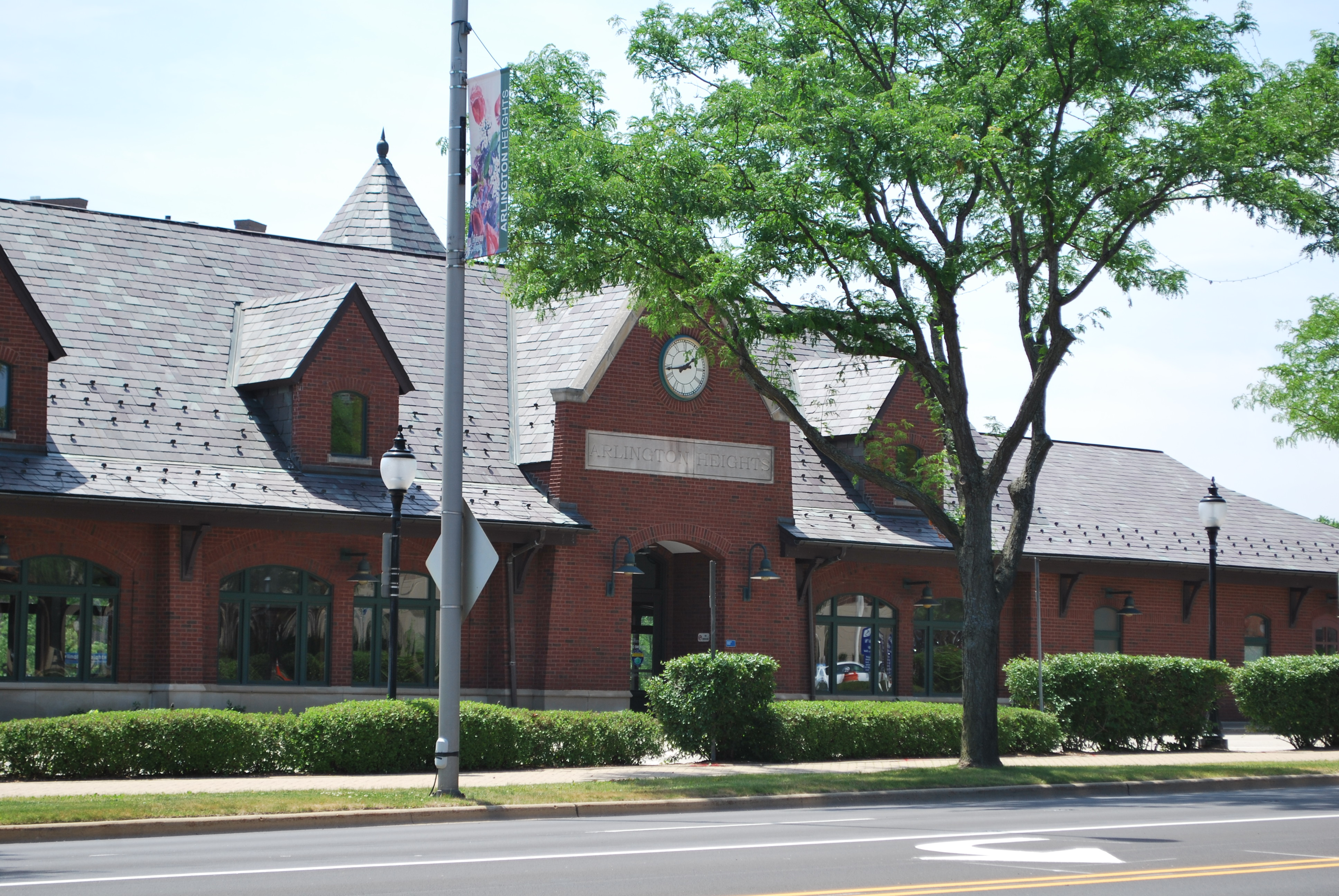
Metra train station in downtown Arlington Heights

Arlington Heights has two stations (Arlington Heights and Arlington Park) on Metra's Union Pacific Northwest Line, which provides daily rail service between Harvard, Illinois, and Ogilvie Transportation Center. Other nearby rail service includes the North Central Service, which stops nearby in Prospect Heights. Interstate 90 and Illinois Route 53 (northern extension of Interstate 290) run along the south and western edges, respectively, of the city, providing easy access to nearby O'Hare International Airport, the city of Chicago, and other suburbs.

Pace provides bus service on multiple routes connecting Arlington Heights to destinations across the region. The Pace Headquarters is located in Arlington Heights.

Arlington Heights Road is a main street running north–south through all of central Arlington Heights. Running to the south it passes through Elk Grove Village, and its southern terminus is in Itasca of DuPage County. Running north it passes through Buffalo Grove, and its northern terminus is in Long Grove of Lake County. It was previously named State Road. It was later renamed to Arlington Heights Road so as not to clash with Chicago's State Street. Northwest Highway (U.S. Route 14) runs northwest–southeast through central Arlington Heights, from Jefferson Park, Chicago to Crystal Lake of McHenry County. Other major streets/roads include Rand Road (U.S. Route 12) running between Des Plaines and Richmond, Golf Road (Illinois Route 58) running between Evanston and Elgin, Algonquin Road (Illinois Route 62) running between Des Plaines and Huntley, Dundee Road (Illinois Route 68) running between Glencoe and East Dundee, Palatine Road, Central Road, Hintz Road, Euclid Avenue, Dunton Avenue, Campbell Street, White Oak Street, Thomas Street, Olive Street, Oakton Street, Kennicott Avenue, Ridge Avenue, Dryden Avenue and Windsor Drive.

=== Police ===
The Arlington Heights Police Department has employed exactly 139 people since 2012. In 2021, 86 of those employees are officers. The 2021 budget of the Arlington Heights Police Department is $28,013,100. This a slight decrease from the biggest of $28,220,179 in 2020.

== In popular culture ==
The following movies were partially filmed in Arlington Heights:

- Lucas (1986) (many scenes filmed at the former Arlington High School including the former Grace Gym and Foyer)
- A Nightmare on Elm Street (2010) (high school scenes filmed at John Hersey High School)
- The Lucky Ones (2008)
- Normal Life (1996)
- Uncle Nino (2003)
- Bernadette (2018)
- The Founder (2016)
