= 29th Illinois General Assembly =

1875 and 1876 legislative session

←	28th	30th	→
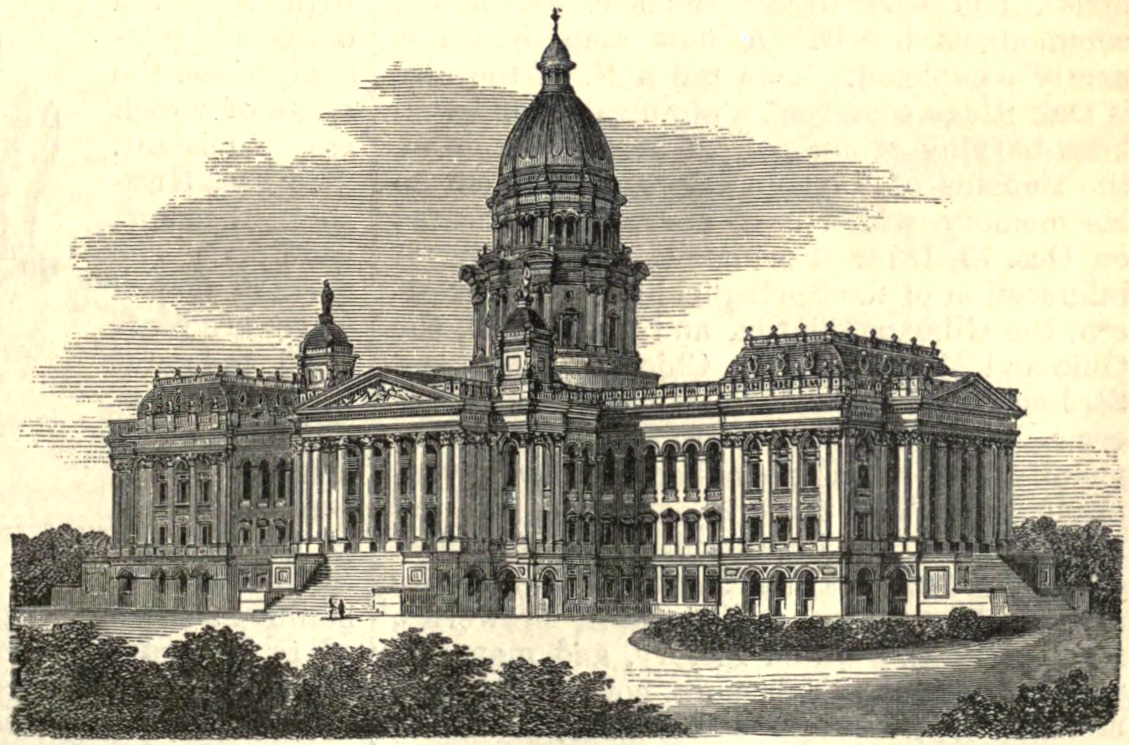
- The Illinois State Capitol in 1879

Overview
- Meeting place: Springfield, Illinois
- Term: 1875 – 1876
- Election: 1874

Illinois Senate
- President: Archibald A. Glenn, Democratic

Illinois House of Representatives
- Speaker: Elijah Haines, Opposition

The 29th Illinois General Assembly was elected in November 1874. The session began on January 6, 1875 and adjourned on April 15, 1875. No party had a majority in either chamber. The Republicans had a plurality in both chambers, with 24 members in the Senate and 69 in the House, but control of the chambers was held by a coalition of Democrats, third parties, and independents.

The third parties represented in this session included the Opposition Party, the Independent Reform Party, and the Democratic Liberal Party, which took many of its members (including its leader, former governor John M. Palmer) and positions from the defunct Liberal Republican Party of 1872. All of these parties were organized for the first time in 1874 and disappeared shortly thereafter, their members subsequently becoming Democrats, Greenbackers, or independents.

The three-sided tensions between Democrats, Republicans and reformers led to frequent turmoil during the session, including a violent brawl that erupted in the House when Republican Alfred M. Jones threw a book at Democrat Lewis Plater. Partly due to this climate, fewer laws were passed during this session than any session since the 1830s; amounting to only 118 pages. The expenses incurred by this General Assembly were also commensurately lower, at $221,810—less than half the amount incurred by the preceding 28th General Assembly.

The 204 members of the 29th Illinois General Assembly are listed in the 1875 Illinois Legislative Manual. Because the Manual is not entirely consistent in its labeling of third-party members of the General Assembly, those identified as "Liberal Republican", "Liberal", or "Democratic Liberal" are counted as a single group in the party totals below. Likewise, the one member of the House labeled simply as "Reform" is treated as a member of the Independent Reform Party for the purpose of the totals.

== Senate ==
The Illinois Senate as elected in 1874 contained 51 members, one from each state legislative district. Under the Illinois Constitution of 1870, Senators served overlapping 4-year terms; thus, 26 of the senators in the 29th General Assembly were elected in 1874, the remainder having been elected in 1872. They ranged in age from 30 to 65.

Democrat Archibald A. Glenn was elected president of the Senate, thereby also taking on the role of acting lieutenant governor.

=== Party composition ===
The Senate of the 29th General Assembly consisted of 24 Republicans, 18 Democrats, and 9 third-party and independent members.

Affiliation	Members
Republican Party	24
Democratic Party	18
Independent	5
Independent Reform Party	2
Liberal Republican/"Liberal"/Democratic Liberal	2
Total	51

=== Members ===
District	Jurisdiction(s) represented	Image	Senator	Party	First elected	Committees
1	Cook County: Chicago wards 1, 2, 10, 11		John C. Haines	Independent	1874	Revenue; Municipalities; Corporations; Banks, Banking; State Charitable Institutions; State Educational Institutions; Appropriation
2	Cook County: Chicago wards 3, 4, 5; Townships of Hyde Park and Lake		Richard S. Thompson	Republican	1872	Judiciary; Municipalities; Federal Relations; Elections
3	Cook County: Chicago wards 6, 7, 8		Miles Kehoe	Democratic	1872	Warehouses; Municipalities; Canals, Rivers; Manufactures; Federal Relations; Elections; Enrolled and Engrossed Bills
4	Cook County: Chicago wards 9, 12, 13		Samuel K. Dow	Republican	1872	Railroads; Finance; Revenue; Municipalities; Penal Institutions; Fees, Salaries
5	Cook County: Chicago wards 14, 15, 18		John Buehler	Independent	1874	Railroads; Municipalities; Corporations; State Educational Institutions; Penal Institutions; Mines, Mining; Manufactures; Fees, Salaries
6	Cook County: Chicago wards 16, 17, 19, 20		Horace F. Waite	Republican	1870	Warehouses; Corporations; Reformatory Institutions; Appropriation; County, Township Organization; Enrolled and Engrossed Bills
7	Cook County: Townships of New Trier, Northfield, Wheeling, Palatine, Barrington, Hanover, Schaumburg, Elk Grove, Maine, Niles, Evanston, Lake View, Jefferson, Leyden, Proviso, Riverside, Cicero, Lyons, Lemont, Palos, Worth, Calumet, Thornton, Bremen, Orland, Rich, Bloom		Michael W. Robinson	Democratic	1874	Judiciary; Railroads; Warehouses; Insurance; Public Buildings, Grounds; Canals, Rivers; Appropriation; Fees, Salaries
8	Lake County, McHenry County		Clark W. Upton	Republican	1872	Judiciary; Corporations; State Charitable Institutions; State Educational Institutions; Federal Relations
9	Boone County, Winnebago County		John Early	Republican	1870	Expenses General Assembly; Insurance; State Charitable Institutions; Reformatory Institutions; Canals, Rivers; Appropriation
10	Jo Daviess County, Stephenson County		Henry Green	Republican	1872	Insurance; Education; Horticulture; Geology and Science
11	Carroll County, Whiteside County		Henry A. Mills	Republican	1874	Finance; Banks, Banking; State Educational Institutions; Printing; Railroads
12	Lee County, Ogle County		George P. Jacobs	Republican	1872	Judiciary; Revenue; Banks, Banking; Manufactures; State Library
13	DeKalb County, Kendall County, Grundy County		Miles B. Castle	Republican	1872	Judicial Department; Warehouses; Finance; Revenue; Miscellany
14	DuPage County, Kane County		Eugene Canfield	Republican	1872	Judiciary; Judicial Department; Municipalities; Appropriation; Fees, Salaries
15	Will County		Albert O. Marshall	Republican	1874	Insurance; Canals, Rivers; Mines, Mining; Military Affairs
16	Iroquois County, Kankakee County		Almon S. Palmer	Republican	1872	Judicial Department; State Charitable Institutions; Horticulture; Enrolled and Engrossed Bills; Miscellany
17	LaSalle County		Fawcett Plumb	Independent	1874	Railroads; Corporations; Mines, Mining; Manufactures; County, Township Organization; Military Affairs; State Library; Geology and Science
18	Ford County, Livingston County		James G. Strong	Republican	1870	Warehouses; Revenue; Expenses General Assembly; Reformatory Institutions; Printing
19	Bureau County, Stark County		Lorenzo D. Whiting	Republican	1870	Railroads; Public Buildings, Grounds; Education; Canals, Rivers; Manufactures
20	Marshall County, Putnam County, Woodford County		Edward A. Wilcox	Republican	1872	State Charitable Institutions; Penal Institutions; Public Buildings, Grounds; Agriculture, Drainage; County, Township Organization; State Library
21	Henry County, Rock Island County		E.C. Moderwell	Republican	1874	Judicial Department; Corporations; Education; Mines, Mining; Printing; Geology and Science
22	Knox County, Mercer County		Patrick H. Sanford	Republican	1872	Roads, Highways, Bridges; Judiciary; Municipalities; State Charitable Institutions; County, Township Organization
23	McDonough County, Warren County		John T. Morgan	Republican	1874	Railroads; Warehouses; Penal Institutions; Appropriation; County, Township Organization
24	Hancock County, Henderson County		Benjamin Warren	Democratic	1872	Railroads; Warehouses; Finance; Revenue; Reformatory Institutions; Education; Roads, Highways, Bridges
25	Fulton County, Schuyler County		Robert Brown	Independent	1874	State Charitable Institutions; Penal Institutions; Education; Agriculture, Drainage; Horticulture; County, Township Organization; Roads, Highways, Bridges; Elections
26	Peoria County		John S. Lee	Democratic	1872	Judiciary; Judicial Department; Revenue; Banks, Banking; State Charitable Institutions; Canals, Rivers; County, Township Organization; Elections
27	Logan County, Tazewell County		James W. Robison	Republican	1874	Finance; Canals, Rivers; Roads, Highways, Bridges; Horticulture; Agriculture, Drainage; Miscellany
28	McLean County		John Cusey	Republican	1872	Public Buildings, Grounds; Canals, Rivers; Appropriation; Agriculture, Drainage; Roads, Highways, Bridges
29	DeWitt County, Macon County		Jesse F Harrold	Independent Reform	1874	Expenses General Assembly; Agriculture, Drainage; County, Township Organization; Fees, Salaries; Printing; Roads, Highways, Bridges; State Library
30	Champaign County, Piatt County		Jairus C. Sheldon	Republican	1872	Revenue; State Educational Institutions; Manufactures; Military Affairs
31	Edgar County, Vermilion County		George Hunt	Republican	1874	Judicial Department; Insurance; State Educational Institutions; Penal Institutions; Mines, Mining
32	Coles County, Douglas County, Moultrie County		Charles B. Steele	Republican	1872	Judiciary; Railroads; State Charitable Institutions; State Educational Institutions; Federal Relations; Elections
33	Coles County, Douglas County, Moultrie County		Thomas Brewer	Democratic	1874	Judicial Department; Revenue; Insurance; Penal Institutions; Canals, Rivers; Fees, Salaries; Elections; Miscellany
34	Christian County, Montgomery County		William B. Hundley	Democratic	1872	Insurance; Banks, Banking; State Charitable Institutions; State Educational Institutions; Appropriation; Mines, Mining; Enrolled and Engrossed Bills
35	Sangamon County		William E. Shutt	Democratic	1874	Judiciary; Judicial Department; Expenses General Assembly; Banks, Banking; Reformatory Institutions; Public Buildings, Grounds; Appropriation; Fees, Salaries
36	Brown County, Cass County, Mason County, Menard County		Archibald A. Glenn	Democratic	1872	
37	Adams County		Bernard Arntzen	Democratic	1874	Judiciary; Judicial Department; Revenue; Insurance; Appropriation; County, Township Organization; Printing; Elections
38	Calhoun County, Scott County, Pike County		William R. Archer	Democratic	1872	Judicial Department; Judiciary; Railroads; Canals, Rivers; County, Township Organization; Federal Relations; Miscellany
39	Greene County, Morgan County		Charles D. Hodges	Democratic	1874	Judiciary; Finance; Revenue; Corporations; State Charitable Institutions; State Educational Institutions; Education; Canals, Rivers
40	Jersey County, Macoupin County		Beatty T. Burke	Democratic	1872	Finance; Revenue; Expenses General Assembly; Municipalities; Fees, Salaries; Military Affairs; Roads, Highways, Bridges; Miscellany
41	Madison County		W.H. Krome	Democratic	1874	Judicial Department; Railroads; Municipalities; Corporations; State Charitable Institutions; Education; Federal Relations; State Library
42	Bond County, Clinton County, Washington County		George Gundlach	Liberal Republican	1872	Railroads; State Charitable Institutions; Reformatory Institutions; Public Buildings, Grounds; Agriculture, Drainage; Manufactures; Miscellany
43	Fayette County, Marion County		John Thompson	Democratic	1874	Expenses General Assembly; State Charitable Institutions; State Educational Institutions; Penal Institutions; Horticulture; Geology and Science; Agriculture, Drainage; Roads, Highways, Bridges
44	Clay County, Richland County, Edwards County, Wabash County, Wayne County		George W. Henry	Republican	1872	Judicial Department; Railroads; Penal Institutions; Education; Fees, Salaries
45	Clark County, Crawford County, Lawrence County, Jasper County		O. V. Smith	Democratic	1874	Warehouses; Expenses General Assembly; Insurance; State Educational Institutions; Reformatory Institutions; Education; Horticulture; Enrolled and Engrossed Bills
46	Hamilton County, Jefferson County, White County		Thomas S. Casey	Democratic	1874	Judiciary; Judicial Department; Corporations; Penal Institutions; Public Buildings, Grounds; Appropriation; Printing
47	Franklin County, Williamson County, Saline County, Gallatin County		William H. Parish	Independent Reform	1874	Judiciary; Warehouses; Municipalities; Insurance; Penal Institutions; Education; Appropriation; Geology and Science
48	Monroe County, Randolph County, Perry County		William K. Murphy	"Liberal"	1872	Judiciary; Judicial Department; Finance; Municipalities; Insurance; Banks, Banking; Mines, Mining; Federal Relations
49	St. Clair County		Jefferson Rainey	Democratic	1874	Railroads; State Educational Institutions; Penal Institutions; Canals, Rivers; Agriculture, Drainage; Horticulture; Mines, Mining; Printing
50	Alexander County, Jackson County, Union County		Jesse Ware	Democratic	1872	Judicial Department; Finance; Revenue; State Charitable Institutions; State Educational Institutions; Education; Canals, Rivers; County, Township Organization
51	Hardin County, Pulaski County, Massac County, Johnson County, Pope County		Samuel M. Glassford	Independent	1874	Railroads; Penal Institutions; Appropriation; Agriculture, Drainage; Mines, Mining; Military Affairs; Roads, Highways, Bridges

== House of Representatives ==
Under the Illinois Constitution of 1870, the state representatives were elected by cumulative voting, with each voter distributing three votes among the available candidates. The Illinois House of Representatives as elected in 1874 thus contained 153 members, three from each of the state's 51 districts. However, only 152 members were present for the 29th General Assembly, as Robert Thiem of Cook County failed to make an appearance.

The members of the House were overwhelmingly new; only 32 of them had previously served in the General Assembly. They ranged in age from 26 to 75; nearly half (72) were farmers. Among the 152 seated members, there were 70 Republicans, 41 Democrats, and 41 independents and reformers.

Opposition Party member Elijah Haines was elected Speaker by a coalition of Democrats, independents and reformers, despite lacking the support of some Democrats.

=== Party composition ===
As might have been expected, the deliberations of a body composed of elements so heterogeneous and conglomerate as was the house were anything but harmonious. The working of the newly-cemented union between elements so diverse proved anything but satisfactory, even to its component parts.

— John Moses

Affiliation	Members
Republican Party	69
Democratic Party	41
Independent	17
Independent Reform Party	10
Opposition Party	8
Independent Democrat	3
Liberal Republican/"Liberal"/Democratic Liberal	2
"Mixed"	1
Total	152

=== Members ===
District	Jurisdiction(s) represented	Image	Representative	Party	First elected	Committees
1	Cook County: Chicago wards 1, 2, 10, 11		James B. Bradwell	Republican	1872	Judiciary; Banks and Banking; Printing
1	Cook County: Chicago wards 1, 2, 10, 11		Lincoln Dubois	Republican	1874	Municipal Affairs; Printing; Railroads; Insurance
1	Cook County: Chicago wards 1, 2, 10, 11		Moses J. Wentworth	Opposition	1874	Judiciary; Libraries; Enrolled and Engrossed Bills; Militia
2	Cook County: Chicago wards 3, 4, 5; Townships of Hyde Park and Lake		George M. Bogue	Republican	1874	Municipal Affairs; Appropriations; Revenue
2	Cook County: Chicago wards 3, 4, 5; Townships of Hyde Park and Lake		John Hise	Democratic	1870	Municipal Affairs; State Institutions; Printing; Revenue
2	Cook County: Chicago wards 3, 4, 5; Townships of Hyde Park and Lake		Solomon P. Hopkins	Republican	1872	Finance; Railroads; Fish and Game; Appropriations
3	Cook County: Chicago wards 6, 7, 8		Thomas M. Halpin	Democratic	1872	Finance; Municipal Affairs; Revenue; Railroads
3	Cook County: Chicago wards 6, 7, 8		William Honan	Democratic	1874	Executive Department; Manufactures; Commerce; Elections
3	Cook County: Chicago wards 6, 7, 8		Conrad L. Niehoff	Democratic	1874	Finance; Municipal Affairs; Banks and Banking; Education
4	Cook County: Chicago wards 9, 12, 13		William H. Condon	Democratic	1872	Judicial Department; Appropriations; Militia; Fees and Salaries
4	Cook County: Chicago wards 9, 12, 13		Orrin L. Mann	Republican	1874	Municipal Affairs; Militia
4	Cook County: Chicago wards 9, 12, 13		Michael M. Miller	Republican	1874	Judicial Department; Penitentiary; Insurance
5	Cook County: Chicago wards 14, 15, 18		John M. Arwedson	Democratic	1874	Banks and Banking; Miscellaneous Subjects; Revenue; Corporations
5	Cook County: Chicago wards 14, 15, 18		Michael J. Dunne	Democratic	1874	Judicial Department; Municipal Affairs; Corporations; Canal and River Improvements
5	Cook County: Chicago wards 14, 15, 18		Carl G. Linderborg	Republican	1874	Horticulture; Libraries; Enrolled and Engrossed Bills; Fees and Salaries
6	Cook County: Chicago wards 16, 17, 19, 20		John C. Barker	Republican	1874	State and Municipal Indebtedness; Judicial Department; Corporations
6	Cook County: Chicago wards 16, 17, 19, 20		William H. Stickney	Opposition	1846	State and Municipal Indebtedness; Executive Department; Judicial Department; Counties and Township Organization
6	Cook County: Chicago wards 16, 17, 19, 20		Robert Thiem		1874	[none]
7	Cook County: Townships of New Trier, Northfield, Wheeling, Palatine, Barrington, Hanover, Schaumburg, Elk Grove, Maine, Niles, Evanston, Lake View, Jefferson, Leyden, Proviso, Riverside, Cicero, Lyons, Lemont, Palos, Worth, Calumet, Thornton, Bremen, Orland, Rich, Bloom		George Dunlap	Republican	1874	Warehouses; Finance; Contingent Expenses of House
7	Cook County: Townships of New Trier, Northfield, Wheeling, Palatine, Barrington, Hanover, Schaumburg, Elk Grove, Maine, Niles, Evanston, Lake View, Jefferson, Leyden, Proviso, Riverside, Cicero, Lyons, Lemont, Palos, Worth, Calumet, Thornton, Bremen, Orland, Rich, Bloom		William Freise	Opposition	1874	State Institutions; Roads, Highways and Bridges; State and Municipal Indebtedness; Counties and Township Organization
7	Cook County: Townships of New Trier, Northfield, Wheeling, Palatine, Barrington, Hanover, Schaumburg, Elk Grove, Maine, Niles, Evanston, Lake View, Jefferson, Leyden, Proviso, Riverside, Cicero, Lyons, Lemont, Palos, Worth, Calumet, Thornton, Bremen, Orland, Rich, Bloom		William H. Skelly	Opposition	1874	Public Charities; Counties and Township Organization; Elections
8	Lake County, McHenry County		Flavel K. Granger	Republican	1872	State and Municipal Indebtedness; Revenue; Corporations
8	Lake County, McHenry County		Elijah Haines	Opposition	1858	Rules
8	Lake County, McHenry County		William A. James	Republican	1874	Manufactures; Penitentiary; Militia
9	Boone County, Winnebago County		Andrew Ashton	Independent	1874	Finance; Manufactures; Miscellaneous Subjects; Revenue
9	Boone County, Winnebago County		Myron K. Avery	Republican	1874	Banks and Banking; Commerce; Roads, Highways and Bridges
9	Boone County, Winnebago County		Richard F. Crawford	Republican	1872	Judiciary; Corporations; Insurance
10	Jo Daviess County, Stephenson County		Edward L. Cronkrite	Independent	1872	State and Municipal Indebtedness; Municipal Affairs; Commerce; Appropriations
10	Jo Daviess County, Stephenson County		Alfred M. Jones	Republican	1872	Rules; Penitentiary; Revenue; Insurance
10	Jo Daviess County, Stephenson County		Forest Turner	Independent Reform	1874	Warehouses; Mileage; Appropriations; Agriculture
11	Carroll County, Whiteside County		Norman D. French	Republican	1874	Geological Survey; Public Charities; Fish and Game
11	Carroll County, Whiteside County		Albert R. McCoy	Independent Democrat	1874	Judiciary; Judicial Department; Counties and Township Organization; Militia; Corporations
11	Carroll County, Whiteside County		Tyler McWhorter	Republican	1874	Mines and Mining; Public Buildings and Grounds; Agriculture
12	Lee County, Ogle County		Henry D. Dement	Republican	1872	Manufactures; Appropriations; Revenue
12	Lee County, Ogle County		Frederick H. Marsh	Independent Democrat	1872	Banks and Banking; Penitentiary; Militia; Railroads
12	Lee County, Ogle County		Isaac Rice	Republican	1872	Warehouses; State Institutions; Education
13	DeKalb County, Kendall County, Grundy County		D.B. Bailey	Republican	1874	State and Municipal Indebtedness; Counties and Township Organization; Miscellaneous Subjects
13	DeKalb County, Kendall County, Grundy County		Phillip Collins	Independent	1874	Penitentiary; Roads, Highways and Bridges; Claims
13	DeKalb County, Kendall County, Grundy County		Joshua McGrath	Independent	1874	Warehouses; Counties and Township Organization; Public Buildings and Grounds
14	DuPage County, Kane County		James F. Claflin	Republican	1874	Libraries; Railroads; Fees and Salaries
14	DuPage County, Kane County		Victor Fredenhagen	Opposition	1874	State Institutions; Corporations; Executive Department; Contingent Expenses of House
14	DuPage County, Kane County		James Herrington	Democratic	1872	Banks and Banking; Revenue; Railroads; Federal Relations
15	Will County		Luke H. Goodrich	Republican	1874	Enrolled and Engrossed Bills; Finance; Executive Department
15	Will County		William Mooney	Independent	1874	Municipal Affairs; Manufactures; Fish and Game; Mines and Mining
15	Will County		Henry H. Stassen	Independent	1874	Public Charities; Counties and Township Organization; Drainage; Insurance
16	Iroquois County, Kankakee County		George W. Parker	Independent	1868	State and Municipal Indebtedness; Finance; Appropriations; Public Buildings and Grounds
16	Iroquois County, Kankakee County		Reuben Richardson	Republican	1874	Warehouses; Miscellaneous Subjects; Claims
16	Iroquois County, Kankakee County		George C. Wilson	Republican	1874	Banks and Banking; Commerce; Revenue
17	LaSalle County		George W. Armstrong	Democratic	1844	Retrenchment; Rules; Appropriations; Railroads
17	LaSalle County		Charles Hoffman	Independent Reform	1874	Commerce; Mines and Mining; Contingent Expenses of House
17	LaSalle County		Elijah H. Spicer	Republican	1874	Counties and Township Organization; Manufactures; Fish and Game; Claims
18	Ford County, Livingston County		Albert M. Haling	Independent	1874	State Institutions; Manufactures; Public Buildings and Grounds; Agriculture
18	Ford County, Livingston County		David McIntosh	Republican	1874	Retrenchment; Public Charities; Drainage; Railroads
18	Ford County, Livingston County		Joseph Robinson	Republican	1874	Retrenchment; Fish and Game; Fees and Salaries
19	Bureau County, Stark County		A. Hammond	Republican	1874	Horticulture; Education; Insurance
19	Bureau County, Stark County		J.J Herron	Independent Reform	1874	Judiciary; Judicial Department; Federal Relations; Education
19	Bureau County, Stark County		Jonas More	Republican	1874	Drainage; Contingent Expenses of House; Warehouses
20	Marshall County, Putnam County, Woodford County		Henry J. Frantz	Opposition	1874	Horticulture; Finance; Public Charities
20	Marshall County, Putnam County, Woodford County		Nathaniel Moore	Republican	1872	Libraries; Finance; Revenue
20	Marshall County, Putnam County, Woodford County		James T. Thornton	Republican	1874	Agriculture; Mileage
21	Henry County, Rock Island County		John T. Browning	Republican	1874	Judicial Department; State Institutions; Corporations
21	Henry County, Rock Island County		John P. Fox	Republican	1874	Education; Retrenchment; Roads, Highways and Bridges
21	Henry County, Rock Island County		Rufus M. Grinnell	Independent Democrat	1874	State and Municipal Indebtedness; Finance; Printing; Horticulture
22	Knox County, Mercer County		Curtis K. Harvey	Independent	1874	Judiciary; Rules; Judicial Department; Penitentiary
22	Knox County, Mercer County		John H. Lewis	Republican	1874	Mines and Mining; Railroads
22	Knox County, Mercer County		John T. McGinnis	Republican	1874	Public Charities; Drainage; Agriculture
23	McDonough County, Warren County		C.W. Boydston	Republican	1874	Geological Survey; Roads, Highways and Bridges; Claims
23	McDonough County, Warren County		Isaac L. Christie	Independent Reform	1874	Warehouses; State and Municipal Indebtedness; Miscellaneous Subjects; Printing
23	McDonough County, Warren County		A.W. King	Republican	1874	State and Municipal Indebtedness; Mines and Mining; Printing
24	Hancock County, Henderson County		Wellington Jenney	Democratic	1874	Retrenchment; Geological Survey; State and Municipal Indebtedness; Penitentiary
24	Hancock County, Henderson County		David Rankin	Republican	1872	Geological Survey; Finance; Penitentiary
24	Hancock County, Henderson County		Paul D. Salter	Independent	1874	Libraries; Roads, Highways and Bridges; Mines and Mining; Fees and Salaries
25	Fulton County, Schuyler County		Samuel P. Cummings	Democratic	1858	Rules; Revenue; Railroads; Counties and Township Organization
25	Fulton County, Schuyler County		James DeWitt	Republican	1874	Retrenchment; Public Charities; Militia
25	Fulton County, Schuyler County		Stephen Y. Thornton	Democratic	1872	Printing; Public Buildings and Grounds; Education; Canal and River Improvements
26	Peoria County		Patrick W. Dunne	Independent	1874	Judicial Department; Manufactures; Retrenchment
26	Peoria County		William Rowcliff	Republican	1874	Warehouses; Fees and Salaries; Agriculture
26	Peoria County		Julius S. Starr	Republican	1872	Judiciary; Judicial Department; Municipal Affairs
27	Logan County, Tazewell County		Richard Holmes	Republican	1874	Counties and Township Organization; Contingent Expenses of House
27	Logan County, Tazewell County		Robert A. Talbott	Republican	1874	State and Municipal Indebtedness; Executive Department; Insurance
27	Logan County, Tazewell County		Thomas Windle	Democratic	1874	Retrenchment; Roads, Highways and Bridges; Claims; Agriculture
28	McLean County		Thomas P. Rogers	Independent Democrat	1872	Penitentiary; Federal Relations; Corporations; Education
28	McLean County		Archibald E. Stewart	Republican	1872	Horticulture; State Institutions; Mines and Mining
28	McLean County		John F. Winter	Republican	1874	Judicial Department; Elections; Fees and Salaries
29	DeWitt County, Macon County		Samuel S. Jack	Independent	1874	Enrolled and Engrossed Bills; Commerce; Education; Insurance
29	DeWitt County, Macon County		Shaw Pease	Independent	1874	Retrenchment; Warehouses; Finance; Agriculture
29	DeWitt County, Macon County		John H. Tyler	Republican	1874	Commerce; Horticulture; Federal Relations
30	Champaign County, Piatt County		George H. Benson	Independent	1874	Warehouses; State Institutions; Commerce; Appropriations
30	Champaign County, Piatt County		William C. Hubbart	Republican	1874	Warehouses; Retrenchment; Public Charities
30	Champaign County, Piatt County		William M. Phillips	Republican	1862	Public Charities; Counties and Township Organization; Fees and Salaries
31	Edgar County, Vermilion County		W.S. O'Hair	Democratic	1874	Public Charities; Banks and Banking; Elections; Fees and Salaries
31	Edgar County, Vermilion County		Andrew Gundy	Republican	1874	Manufactures; Mines and Mining
31	Edgar County, Vermilion County		John Sidell	Republican	1874	Railroads; Public Buildings and Grounds; Agriculture
32	Coles County, Douglas County, Moultrie County		James A. Connolly	Republican	1872	Judiciary; Rules; Penitentiary
32	Coles County, Douglas County, Moultrie County		E.M. Vause	Independent Reform	1874	Geological Survey; Roads, Highways and Bridges; Agriculture
32	Coles County, Douglas County, Moultrie County		Richard A. Wilson	Independent Reform	1874	Geological Survey; Fish and Game; Printing; Agriculture
33	Coles County, Douglas County, Moultrie County		William Chew	Republican	1874	Judicial Department; Corporations; Education
33	Coles County, Douglas County, Moultrie County		William Gillmore	Democratic	1874	Railroads; Public Charities; Appropriations; Insurance
33	Coles County, Douglas County, Moultrie County		William Middlesworth	Democratic	1864	Penitentiary; Revenue; Railroads; Public Buildings and Grounds
34	Christian County, Montgomery County		John C. Hagler	Democratic	1874	Retrenchment; Municipal Affairs; Manufactures; Public Buildings and Grounds
34	Christian County, Montgomery County		William F. Mulkey	Democratic	1874	Manufactures; Elections; Public Buildings and Grounds; Penitentiary
34	Christian County, Montgomery County		Levi Scott	Republican	1874	Commerce; Elections; Railroads
35	Sangamon County		Shelby M. Cullom	Republican	1856	Judiciary; Rules; Municipal Affairs
35	Sangamon County		Fred Gehring	Democratic Liberal	1874	Mines and Mining; Elections; Printing; Education
35	Sangamon County		Josiah L. Wilcox	Democratic	1874	Finance; Appropriations; Militia; Public Buildings and Grounds
36	Brown County, Cass County, Mason County, Menard County		Nathaniel W. Branson	Republican	1872	Judiciary; Judicial Department; Penitentiary; Federal Relations
36	Brown County, Cass County, Mason County, Menard County		A.G. Nance	Democratic	1874	Warehouses; Public Buildings and Grounds; Education
36	Brown County, Cass County, Mason County, Menard County		John W. Pugh	Democratic	1874	Retrenchment; Libraries; Agriculture
37	Adams County		Thomas J. Bates	Democratic	1874	State Institutions; Counties and Township Organization; Commerce; Drainage
37	Adams County		Rezin H. Downing	Republican	1874	Warehouses; Roads, Highways and Bridges; Elections
37	Adams County		Ira M. Moore	Democratic Liberal	1872	Judiciary; Judicial Department; Municipal Affairs; Education
38	Calhoun County, Scott County, Pike County		James Callans	Democratic	1874	Libraries; Finance; Judicial Department; Education
38	Calhoun County, Scott County, Pike County		Joseph S. Harvey	Democratic	1874	State and Municipal Indebtedness; Executive Department; Roads, Highways and Bridges
38	Calhoun County, Scott County, Pike County		John Moses	Republican	1874	Appropriations; Mines and Mining; Public Buildings and Grounds
39	Greene County, Morgan County		John Gordon	Republican	1872	Finance; State Institutions; Roads, Highways and Bridges; Corporations
39	Greene County, Morgan County		Andrew J. Thompson	Democratic	1874	Horticulture; Libraries; State Institutions; Public Buildings and Grounds
39	Greene County, Morgan County		Samuel Wood	Democratic	1874	Appropriations; Claims; Revenue; Railroads
40	Jersey County, Macoupin County		Samuel S. Gilbert	Democratic	1874	Judiciary; Judicial Department; Public Charities; Insurance
40	Jersey County, Macoupin County		Henry F. Martin	Republican	1874	State and Municipal Indebtedness; Banks and Banking; Public Buildings and Grounds
40	Jersey County, Macoupin County		Oliver P. Powel	Independent	1874	Miscellaneous Subjects; Fees and Salaries; Insurance
41	Madison County		Franklin S. Pike	Democratic	1874	Enrolled and Engrossed Bills; State and Municipal Indebtedness; Contingent Expenses of House
41	Madison County		George A. Smith	Republican	1874	Geological Survey; Mileage; Militia
41	Madison County		G.H. Weigler	Democratic	1874	Manufactures; Roads, Highways and Bridges; Mines and Mining; Education
42	Bond County, Clinton County, Washington County		Andrew G. Henry	Republican	1872	Executive Department; Judicial Department; Elections
42	Bond County, Clinton County, Washington County		J.K. McMasters	Democratic	1874	Enrolled and Engrossed Bills; Penitentiary; Commerce; Drainage
42	Bond County, Clinton County, Washington County		William H. Moore	"Mixed"	1874	Mileage; Judicial Department; Public Charities; Corporations
43	Fayette County, Marion County		William R. Hubbard	Republican	1874	Revenue; Penitentiary; Commerce
43	Fayette County, Marion County		John B. Johnson	Independent	1874	Horticulture; Fish and Game; Drainage; Fees and Salaries
43	Fayette County, Marion County		Thomas E. Merritt	Democratic	1868	Warehouses; Judiciary; Banks and Banking; Corporations
44	Clay County, Richland County, Edwards County, Wabash County, Wayne County		Samuel R. Hall	Republican	1874	Counties and Township Organization; Public Buildings and Grounds; Agriculture
44	Clay County, Richland County, Edwards County, Wabash County, Wayne County		John Landrigan	Independent Reform	1868	Executive Department; Roads, Highways and Bridges; Appropriations; Revenue; Public Charities
44	Clay County, Richland County, Edwards County, Wabash County, Wayne County		Byron J. Rotan	Democratic	1874	Judicial Department; State Institutions; Claims; Corporations
45	Clark County, Crawford County, Lawrence County, Jasper County		John W. Briscoe	Democratic	1874	Horticulture; Elections; Miscellaneous Subjects; Railroads
45	Clark County, Crawford County, Lawrence County, Jasper County		E. Callahan	Republican	1874	Judiciary; State and Municipal Indebtedness; Federal Relations
45	Clark County, Crawford County, Lawrence County, Jasper County		John H. Halley	Democratic	1874	Judiciary; Judicial Department; Banks and Banking; Fees and Salaries
46	Hamilton County, Jefferson County, White County		Amos B. Barrett	Republican	1874	State Institutions; Commerce; Roads, Highways and Bridges
46	Hamilton County, Jefferson County, White County		Hiram W. Hall	Independent Reform	1874	Retrenchment; Militia; Contingent Expenses of House; Agriculture
46	Hamilton County, Jefferson County, White County		Boone Kershaw	Independent Reform	1874	Warehouses; Counties and Township Organization; Fish and Game; Corporations
47	Franklin County, Williamson County, Saline County, Gallatin County		Alexander C. Nelson	Democratic	1874	Libraries; Public Charities; Penitentiary; Drainage
47	Franklin County, Williamson County, Saline County, Gallatin County		Isaac Smith	"Reform"	1874	Warehouses; Municipal Affairs; Fish and Game; Federal Relations
47	Franklin County, Williamson County, Saline County, Gallatin County		John N. Wasson	Republican	1874	Judicial Department; Municipal Affairs; Corporations
48	Monroe County, Randolph County, Perry County		Jonathan Chesnutwood	Democratic	1874	Railroads; State and Municipal Indebtedness; Executive Department; Contingent Expenses of House
48	Monroe County, Randolph County, Perry County		Samuel C. McKee	Republican	1874	Retrenchment; Manufactures; Claims
48	Monroe County, Randolph County, Perry County		Joseph W. Rickert	Democratic	1874	Retrenchment; Roads, Highways and Bridges; Printing; Claims; Federal Relations
49	St. Clair County		William G. Kase	Democratic	1874	Warehouses; Judiciary; Banks and Banking; Corporations
49	St. Clair County		James Rankin	Democratic	1874	Mines and Mining; Elections; Contingent Expenses of House; Fees and Salaries
49	St. Clair County		John Thomas	Republican	1838	Counties and Township Organization; Appropriations; Agriculture
50	Alexander County, Jackson County, Union County		Fontaine E. Albright	Opposition	1874	Judiciary; State Institutions; Mines and Mining; Drainage
50	Alexander County, Jackson County, Union County		Matthew J. Inscore	Republican	1872	Enrolled and Engrossed Bills; Judicial Department; Municipal Affairs
50	Alexander County, Jackson County, Union County		Claiborn Winston	Democratic	1874	Judicial Department; State Institutions; Revenue; Federal Relations
51	Hardin County, Pulaski County, Massac County, Johnson County, Pope County		Benjamin Jones	Republican	1874	Judicial Department; Printing; Education
51	Hardin County, Pulaski County, Massac County, Johnson County, Pope County		Lewis Plater	Democratic	1874	Banks and Banking; Penitentiary; Militia; Insurance
51	Hardin County, Pulaski County, Massac County, Johnson County, Pope County		James R. Stegall	Independent	1874	Geological Survey; Mileage; Municipal Affairs; Insurance

== See also ==
- 44th United States Congress
- List of Illinois state legislatures
