= Cook County Board of Commissioners 15th district =

- District
- District 15
- Current Board of Commissioners map, 15th district highlighted in red
- Country: United States
- State: Illinois
- County: Cook
- Townships: list: Barrington; Elk Grove; Hanover; Jefferson; Maine; Schaumburg

Government
  - Type: District
  - Body: Cook County Board of Commissioners
  - Commissioner: Kevin B. Morrison (D)

Cook County Board of Commissioners 15th district is an electoral district for the Cook County Board of Commissioners. It is currently represented by Kevin B. Morrison, a Democrat.

== History ==
The district was established in 1994, when the board transitioned from holding elections in individual districts, as opposed to the previous practice of having two multi-member districts: one for ten members from the city of Chicago and another for seven members from suburban Cook County.

== Geography ==
=== 1994 boundaries ===
When the district was first established, it covered part of the western suburbs of Cook County.

=== 2001 redistricting ===
New boundaries were adopted in August 2001, with redistricting taking place following the 2000 United States census.

In regards to townships, the district's redistricted boundaries included portions of Elk Grove, Hanover, Schaumburg, and Wheeling townships. The district covered the entirety of Hanover and Schaumburg townships.

=== 2012 redistricting ===
The district as redistricted in 2012 following the 2010 United States census, included parts of Arlington Heights, Barrington, Barrington Hills, Bartlett, East Dundee, Elgin, Elk Grove Village, Hanover Park, Hoffman Estates, Inverness, Mount Prospect, Rolling Meadows, Roselle, Schaumburg, South Barrington, and Streamwood.

In regards to townships and equivalent jurisdictions, it included portions of the city of Chicago, as well as portions of Barrington, Elk Grove, Hanover, Palatine, Schaumburg, and Wheeling townships. The district covered the entirety of Barrington, Hanover and Schaumburg townships.

The district was 128.64 square miles (82,328.36 acres).

=== 2022 redistricting ===
The district as redistricted in 2022, following the 2020 United States census, contains the entirety of Barrington and Hanover Townships; large portions of Elk Grove, Maine, and Schaumburg Townships; and a minuscule segment of Jefferson Township.

== Politics ==
From 1994 until 2018, the district was represented by Republicans. The district was considered to be a Republican stronghold during this time. In the 2016 United States presidential election, the Democratic ticket of Hillary Clinton and Tim Kaine won a strong victory in the district over the Republican ticket of Donald Trump and Mike Pence. The commissioner of the district flipped to the Democratic Party in 2018, a year which saw an overall strong performance by the Democratic Party in that year's elections in Illinois and an unprecedentedly strong and well-funded effort by the Cook County Democratic Party to target the district.

== List of commissioners representing the district ==
Commissioner	Party	Years	Electoral history
Carl R. Hansen	Republican	December 1994–December 2006	Previously served as commissioner from suburban Cook County at-large; elected in 1994, 1998, 2002; lost reelection in 2006
Tim Schneider	Republican	December 2006–December 2018	Elected in 2006, 2010, 2014; lost reelection in 2018
Kevin B. Morrison	Democratic	December 2018–present	Elected in 2018 and 2022

== Election results ==
Cook County Board of Commissioners 15th district general elections
Year	Winning candidate	Party	Vote (pct)	Opponent	Party	Vote (pct)	Opponent	Party	Vote (pct)
1994	Carl R. Hansen	Republican							
1998	Carl R. Hansen	Republican	35,681 (61.00%)	Bridget Mary White	Democratic	22,810 (39.00%)			
2002	Carl R. Hansen	Republican	38,530 (59.56%)	Brian J. McPartlin	Democratic	26,165 (40.44%)			
2006	Timothy O. Schneider	Republican	35,696 (52.67%)	Jim Steven Dasakis	Democratic	32,075 (47.33%)			
2010	Timothy O. Schneider	Republican	41,106 (57.55%)	Jim Steven Dasakis	Democratic	25,976 (36.37%)	Lara Ehorn	Green	4,342 (6.08%)
2014	Timothy O. Schneider	Republican	40,569 (58.83%)	Michael A Urban	Democratic	28,392 (41.17%)			
2018	Kevin B. Morrison	Democratic	52,807 (54.93%)	Timothy O. Schneider	Republican	43,331 (45.07%)			
2022	Kevin B. Morrison	Democratic	43,858 (57.80%)	Chuck Cerniglia	Republican	32,027 (42.20%)			
