= Government of Cook County, Illinois =

Home rule county government in Illinois, United States

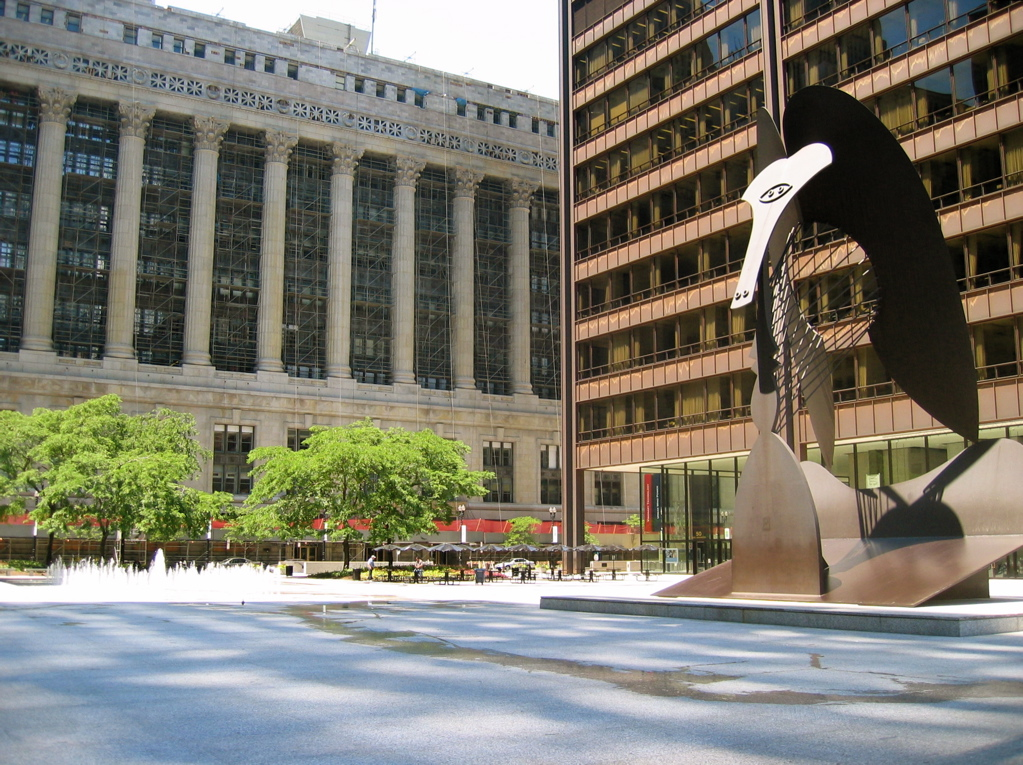
The century-old, neoclassical County and City Hall building (left) in the Chicago Loop houses the County Board chambers and administrative offices

The government of Cook County, Illinois, is primarily composed of the Board of Commissioners, other elected officials such as the Sheriff, State's Attorney, Treasurer, Board of Review, Clerk, Assessor, Cook County Circuit Court judges and Circuit Court Clerk, as well as numerous other officers and entities. Cook County is the only home rule county in Illinois. The Cook County Code is the codification of Cook County's local ordinances.

== Organization ==
=== Board of Commissioners ===
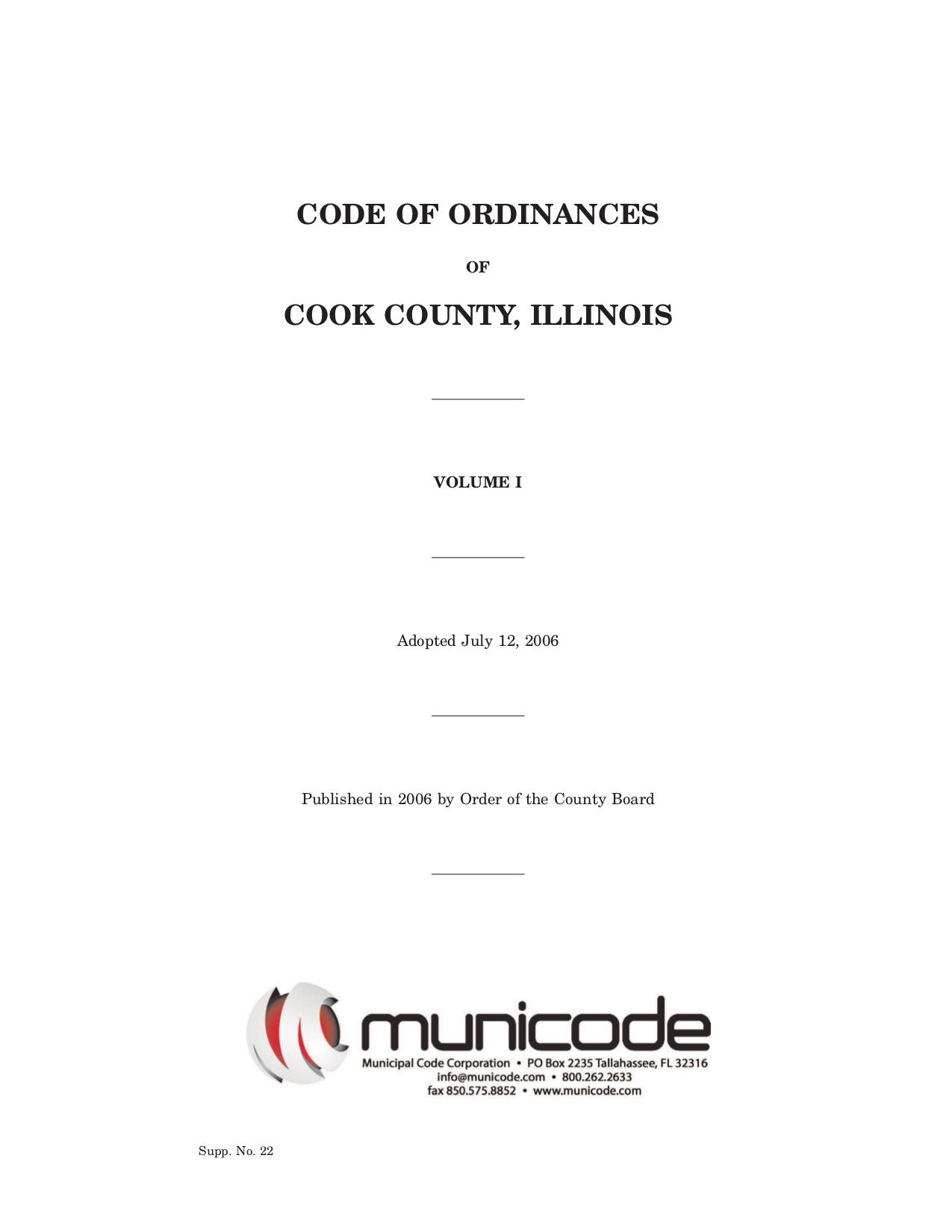
Title page of the Cook County Code of Ordinances

The Cook County Board of Commissioners is the county's legislative body. It made up of 17 commissioners who are elected by district for four-year terms. The county board sets policy and laws for the county regarding property, public health services, public safety, and maintenance of county highways. It is presided over by the County Board President, currently Toni Preckwinkle.

=== Sheriff ===
The Cook County Sheriff's Office is the sheriff. All Cook County Sheriff's Deputies have police powers regardless of their particular job function or title. Like other Sheriffs' departments in Illinois, the Sheriff can provide all traditional law-enforcement functions, including county-wide patrol and investigations irrespective of municipal boundaries, even in the city of Chicago, but has traditionally limited its police patrol functions to unincorporated areas of the county.

The Cook County Department of Corrections operates the Cook County Jail, the largest single-site jail in the nation.

=== State's Attorney ===
The Cook County State's Attorney handles criminal prosecutions.

=== Circuit Court ===
The Circuit Court of Cook County, a State agency partially funded by Cook County, accepts more than 1.2 million cases each year for filing. The Cook County Juvenile Detention Center, under the authority of the Chief Judge of the State court, is the first juvenile center in the nation and one of the largest in the nation.

=== Other agencies ===
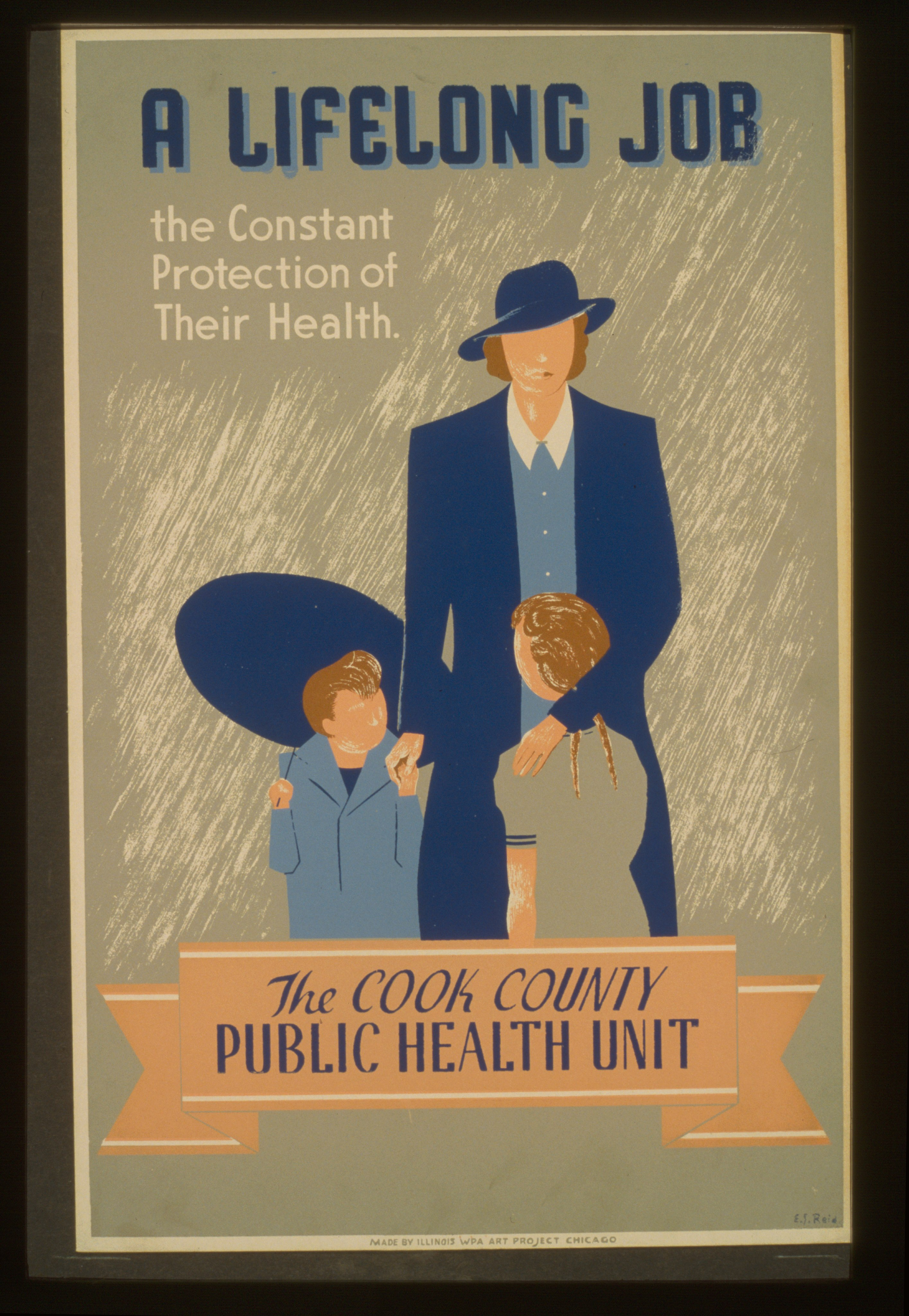
WPA poster for the Cook County Public Health Unit (1941)

The Cook County Public Defender provides legal representation in the areas of felony and misdemeanor criminal cases, delinquency, abuse/neglect, some appeals, post-conviction and traffic (non-petty) cases throughout the county. It is the largest Public Defender System in the United States. It is the largest State Public Defender's office in the country.

The Cook County Public Guardian acts as the guardian of disabled adults, as well as to act as attorneys and guardian ad litem for abused and neglected children in the county.

The Bureau of Health Services administers the county's public health services and is the second-largest public health system in the nation. Three hospitals are part of this system: John H. Stroger, Jr. Hospital of Cook County, Provident Hospital, and Oak Forest Hospital of Cook County, along with over 30 clinics.

The Cook County Highway Department is responsible for the design and maintenance of roadways in the county. These thoroughfares are mostly composed of major and minor arterials, with a few local roads. Although the Highway Department was instrumental in designing many of the expressways in the county, today they are under the jurisdiction of the state.

The Cook County Forest Preserves, organized in 1915, is a separate, independent taxing body, but the Cook County Board of Commissioners also acts as its Board of Commissioners. The district is a belt of 69,000 acres (280 km^{2}) of forest reservations surrounding the city of Chicago. The Brookfield Zoo (managed by the Chicago Zoological Society) and the Chicago Botanic Garden (managed by the Chicago Horticultural Society) are located in the forest preserves.

The Cook County Law Library is the second-largest county law library in the nation.

Cook County Department of Public Health and the Cook County Medical Examiner's office.

=== Former offices and agencies ===
The Cook County Coroner, an elected office, acted as county coroner until being replaced by the appointed Cook County Medical Examiner in 1976.

The Cook County Recorder of Deeds, from 1872 until 2020, recorded, stored and maintained land records and other official documents in perpetuity for public and private use, facilitating home ownership and mortgage lending. The Office is a statutorily-authorized repository for federal military discharge records (Form DD-214), which are held as private records available only to those authorized by law. The office was merged with the Clerk's office in 2020.

== Budget ==
Cook County is the fifth largest employer in Chicago.

In March 2008, the County Board increased the sales tax by one percent to 1.75 percent. This followed a quarter-cent increase in mass transit taxes. In Chicago, the rate increased to 10.25 percent, the steepest nominal rate of any major metropolitan area in America. In Evanston, sales tax reached 10 percent and Oak Lawn residents pay 9.5 percent. On July 22, 2008, the Cook County board voted against Cook County Commissioner's proposal to repeal the tax increase.

== Politics ==
Presidential Election Results 1960–2016
Year	Democrat	Republican
2020	74.22% 1,725,973	24.01% 558,269
2016	73.90% 1,611,946	20.80% 453,287
2012	74.00% 1,488,537	24.63% 495,542
2008	76.48% 1,582,973	23.05% 477,038
2004	70.25% 1,439,724	29.15% 597,405
2000	68.63% 1,280,547	28.65% 534,542
1996	66.79% 1,153,289	26.73% 461,557
1992	58.21% 1,249,533	28.20% 605,300
1988	55.77% 1,129,973	43.36% 878,582
1984	51.02% 1,112,641	48.40% 1,055,558
1980	51.99% 1,124,584	39.60% 856,574
1976	53.44% 1,180,814	44.69% 987,498
1972	46.01% 1,063,268	53.41% 1,234,307
1968	50.56% 1,181,316	41.11% 960,493
1964	63.18% 1,537,181	36.82% 895,718
1960	56.37% 1,378,343	43.33% 1,059,607

The Cook County Democratic Party represents Democratic voters in 50 wards in the city of Chicago and 30 suburban townships of Cook County. The organization has dominated County, city, and state politics since the 1930s.

The county has by far more Democratic Party members than any other Illinois county and is one of the most Democratic counties in the United States. It has voted only once for a Republican candidate in a Presidential election in the last fifty years, when county voters preferred Richard Nixon to George McGovern in 1972.

The 1970 Illinois Constitution allows the controlling party to redraw voting districts; the Democrats have done so several times, most recently in 2011, effectively gerrymandering to gain additional seats in the state congress from Republicans in the 2012 election.

In the 1980s, Cook County was ground zero to an extensive FBI investigation called Operation Greylord. Ninety-two officials were indicted, including 17 judges, 48 lawyers, 8 policemen, 10 deputy sheriffs, 8 court officials, and a state legislator.

=== Secession movements ===
To establish more localized government control and policies which reflect the often different values and needs of large suburban sections of the sprawling county, several secession movements have been made over the years which called for certain townships or municipalities to form their own independent counties.

In the late 1970s, a movement started which proposed a separation of six northwest suburban townships, Cook County's panhandle (Barrington, Hanover, Palatine, Wheeling, Schaumburg, and Elk Grove) from Cook to form Lincoln County, in honor of the former U.S. president and Illinois resident. It is likely that Arlington Heights would have been the county seat. This northwest suburban region of Cook is moderately conservative and has a population over 500,000. Local legislators, led by State Senator Dave Regnar, went so far as to propose it as official legislation in the Illinois House. The legislation died, however, before coming to a vote.

In 2004, Blue Island Mayor Donald E. Peloquin organized a coalition of fifty-five south and southwest suburban municipalities to form a new county, also proposing the name Lincoln County. The county would include everything south of Burbank, stretching as far west as Orland Park, as far east as Calumet City, and as far south as Matteson, covering an expansive area with a population of over one million residents. Peloquin argued that the south suburbs are often shunned by the city (although Chicago is not bound or required to do anything for other municipalities) and he blamed the Chicago-centric policies of Cook County for failing to jumpstart the somewhat-depressed south suburban local economy. Pending sufficient interest from local communities, Peloquin planned a petition drive to place a question regarding the secession on the general election ballot, but the idea was not met with success.

Talk of secession from Cook County amongst some outlying communities again heated up in mid-2008 in response to a highly controversial 1% sales tax hike which has pushed the tax rates across the county communities up amongst the highest in the nation. Some border towns in particular had been outraged, as people can take their business across the county border (paying, for instance, 7% in Lake County instead of Palatine's 9.5%). The secession issue eventually died down from the nominal tax increase.

In 2011, two downstate Republican State Representatives, Bill Mitchell of the 87th district and Adam Brown of the 101st district, proposed statehood for Cook County. Mitchell said that Chicago is "dictating its views" to the rest of the state and Brown added that Chicago "overshadows" the rest of Illinois.

== See also ==
- Government of Chicago
- Government of Illinois
- Cook County Democratic Party
- Cook County Administration Building
