= Glassford (disambiguation) =

Glassford is a village in Scotland.

Glassford may also refer to:

== People ==
- Bill Glassford (1914–2016), American football player and coach
- John Glassford (1715–1783), Scottish Tobacco Lord
- John Glassford (Canadian football) (b. 1953), Canadian linebacker
- John Glassford (cricketer) (b. 1946), English cricketer
- Samuel M. Glassford (1825–1901), American politician
- William A. Glassford (1886–1958), American admiral
- Henry Glassford Bell (1803–1874), Scottish lawyer, poet, and historian

== Places ==
- Glassford Island, a small island in Lough Owel, County Westmeath, Ireland
