= International Medical Corps =

International non-profit organization

International Medical Corps is a global, nonprofit, humanitarian aid organization that provides emergency medical services, healthcare training and capacity building to those affected by disaster, disease or conflict. It seeks to strengthen medical services and infrastructure in the aftermath of crises.

International Medical Corps focuses on health services and training. This includes the prevention and treatment of infectious diseases; supplemental food for malnourished children; water, sanitation and hygiene; mental health and psychosocial care; and gender-based violence.

== History ==
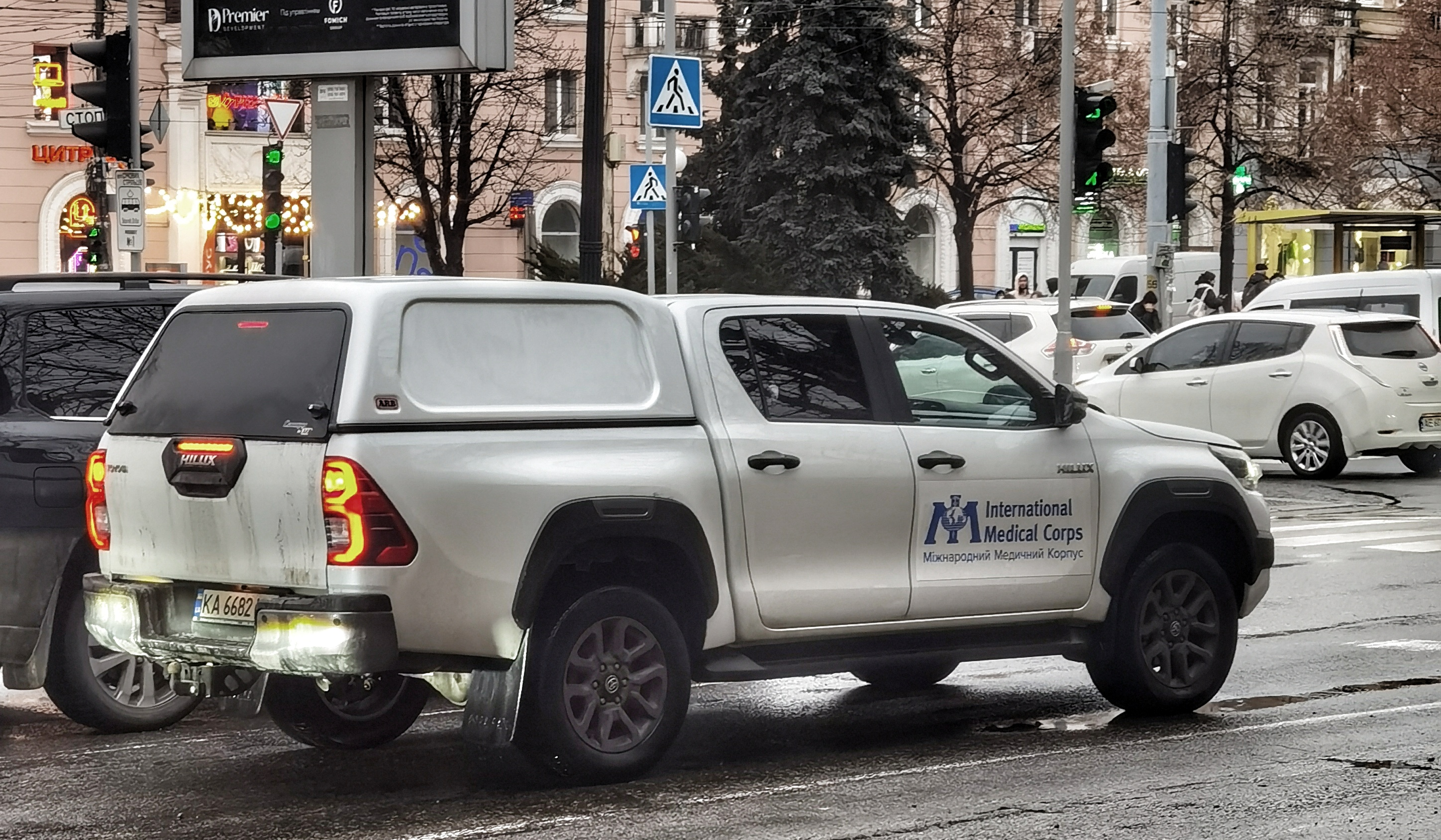
International Medical Corps car in Dnipro, Ukraine during war.

The organization was founded in 1984 by Dr. Robert Simon, together with a group of American physicians and nurses. It is a private, nonprofit organization, with no political or religious affiliation. Simon is a professor in the Department of Emergency Medicine at Rush University, John H. Stroger Jr. Hospital of Cook County in Chicago. He is the former Bureau Chief of the Cook County Bureau of Health Services.

== Current operations ==
International Medical Corps works in some 30 countries globally, including the United States, providing relief to populations facing conflict, disease, natural disaster, famine and poverty, while also laying the foundation for sustainable development through training. Its programs are funded from both public and private sources, including the US government, the Directorate-General for European Civil Protection and Humanitarian Aid Operations (ECHO) and the Bill & Melinda Gates Foundation.

International Medical Corps is based in Los Angeles, with other administrative offices in Washington, D.C.; London, England; and Split, Croatia. As of 2024, it employed thousands of staff and has worked in more than 85 countries.

International Medical Corps has provided disaster relief for people impacted a wide range of disasters, conflicts and outbreaks of disease, including the 2010 Haiti earthquake, the 2011 Tōhoku earthquake and tsunami, the Ebola virus epidemic in West Africa, the April 2015 Nepal earthquake, and food insecurity and famine in South Sudan in 2017. It has responded to a number of Ebola outbreaks in the Democratic Republic of the Congo, including the Kivu Ebola epidemic, where it participated in vaccine and treatment trials. It provided medical and mental health care to people affected by Hurricane Dorian, which devastated the Bahamas in 2019. It provided medical care, equipment and supplies in response to the COVID-19 pandemic globally and across the United States, including in Alabama, California, Illinois, Massachusetts, New York, Puerto Rico and Texas. The International Medical Corps country team in Lebanon was able to quickly respond to the 2020 Beirut explosion, providing medical and mental health care.
