= Calumet, Illinois =

Calumet, Illinois may refer to the following place:

- Calumet City, Illinois
- Calumet Park, Illinois
- Calumet Township, Cook County, Illinois
- Calumet River
