= Independent Reform Party =

The Independent Reform Party, sometimes also known as the Anti-Monopoly Party, was a short-lived political party in Illinois, in the United States. Arising out of the disorder created by the fracturing of the Republican Party in 1872, when the Liberal Republican Party had been created, it was organized on June 10, 1874, in a convention at Springfield. It fielded candidates in that year's elections but disappeared thereafter.

The platform of the Independent Reform Party called for budget cuts, the repeal of the National Bank Act, and the institution of an inflationary currency policy based on the greenback. It criticized the corruption of the existing parties, focusing on corrupt ties between government and the railroad industry: the party demanded an end to railroad land grants and the giving of free railroad passes to elected officials, and strict enforcement of the existing railroad laws. This platform was also endorsed by the state convention of the Liberal Republican Party under former Illinois governor John M. Palmer, with the exception of the currency plank.

At the convention, Richard Rowett had argued forcefully for the party platform to support the gold standard, but he was defeated by advocates of inflation. A provision that would have insisted on the full payment of the national debt was also defeated.

Several Independent Reform Party representatives were elected to the 29th Illinois General Assembly in 1874. There they joined other reform parties and independents in caucusing with the Democrats, giving that party a majority in both chambers and control of the leadership. However, the tensions between Democrats and reformers made the 29th General Assembly unusually turbulent.

At the statewide level, the Independent Reform Party nominated David Gore for Treasurer and Samuel Etter for Superintendent of Public Instruction. Etter was also nominated by the Democrats, and thus was elected by a narrow 30,000-vote margin, while Gore was defeated by 35,000 votes.

== See also ==
- Opposition Party (United States)
- Greenback Party

== Works cited ==
- McPherson, Edward (1876). A Hand-Book of Politics for 1876. Philp & Solomons. p. 255.
- Moses, John (1892). Illinois, historical and statistical.
- Illinois Blue Book. 1908.
- Prominent Democrats of Illinois. 1899.
- Illinois Legislative Manual–1875. 1875.
