= John Moses (Illinois politician) =

American lawyer and politician

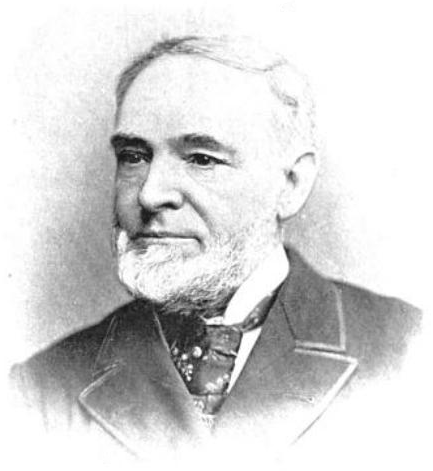

Member of the Illinois House of Representatives
- In office 1875
- Constituency: 38th District

Personal details
- Born: 1825 Niagara Falls, New York
- Died: July 3, 1898 (aged 72–73) Chicago, Illinois
- Party: Republican
- Occupation: Judge, politician, banker, historian

John Moses (1825–1898) was an Illinois judge, politician, banker and historian. His magnum opus was Illinois, Historical and Statistical, published in 1892, which weighs in at more than 1,300 pages and took its author eleven years to complete.

== Biography ==
Moses was born in 1825 in Niagara Falls, New York. He arrived in Naples, Illinois with his family in 1837.

Moses served for some time as the county judge for Scott County, and hosted Abraham Lincoln at his office in Winchester during the 1858 campaign. He served as private secretary to Governor Yates during the Civil War.

In 1874, Moses was elected to the Illinois House of Representatives as a Republican, serving in the 29th General Assembly as one of the three representatives of the 38th District, which comprised the counties of Scott, Pike and Calhoun. He included an especially detailed recounting of that chaotic session in his 1892 history.

When away from political life, Moses worked as a farmer and banker. He bought out the failed People's National Bank of Winchester in 1875, operating under the name "John Moses & Co.", although he was the sole member of the firm until 1876.

In the 1880s, Moses took up the work of Illinois history, authoring or coauthoring at least four books on the subject. He commenced work on his magnum opus Illinois, Historical and Statistical in 1882, and was elected secretary and librarian of the Chicago Historical Society in 1886.

Moses died in Chicago on July 3, 1898; his body was returned to Winchester for burial.

== Writings ==
- Illinois, Historical and Statistical, 1892
- The White City, coauthor, 1893
- History of Chicago, Illinois, coauthor, 1895
- Biographical Dictionary and Portrait Gallery of the Representative Men of the United States, Illinois volume, editor, 1896

== Works cited ==
- Illinois Legislative Manual–1875. 1875.
- Moses, Zebina (1906). Historical sketches of John Moses, of Plymouth. Vol. 2.
- Moses, John (1892). Illinois, historical and statistical (PDF) – via Wikimedia Commons.
