= Moses J. Wentworth =

American politician

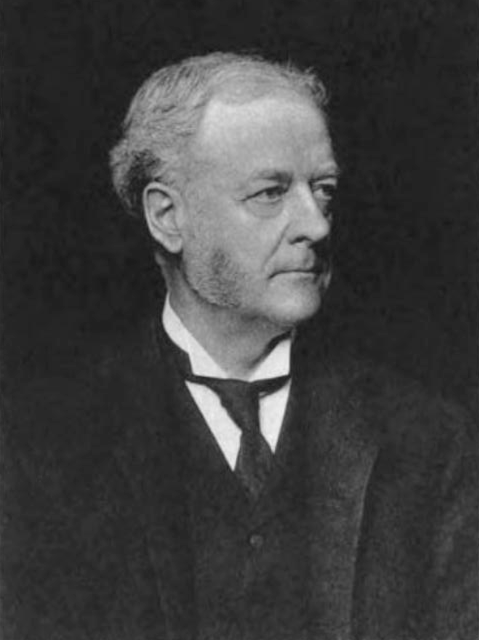

Member of the Illinois House of Representatives
- In office 1875–1882
- Constituency: 1st District

Personal details
- Born: Moses Jones Wentworth; May 9, 1848 Sandwich, New Hampshire
- Died: March 12, 1922 (aged 73) Chicago, Illinois
- Resting place: Rosehill Cemetery
- Party: Illinois Opposition; Democratic
- Spouse: Lizzie Shaw Hunt (m. 1891)
- Children: John and Hunt
- Relatives: John Wentworth (uncle)
- Education: Phillips Academy; Harvard College; University of Chicago Law School
- Occupation: Lawyer, politician

Moses Jones Wentworth (1848–1922) was an American lawyer and politician from Chicago, who served as a member of the 29th, 30th, and 31st General Assemblies in the Illinois House of Representatives, from the 1st District. He was elected as a member of the short-lived Illinois Opposition Party.

== Biography ==
Moses J. Wentworth was born in Sandwich, New Hampshire on May 9, 1848. He graduated from Phillips Academy in 1863, and from Harvard College in 1868. He moved to Chicago later that year.

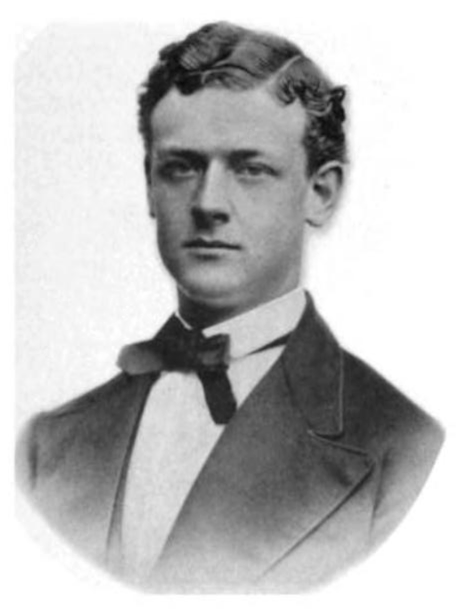
At Harvard, c. 1868

He earned a Bachelor of Laws degree from the University of Chicago Law School, and was admitted to the Illinois bar in 1871.

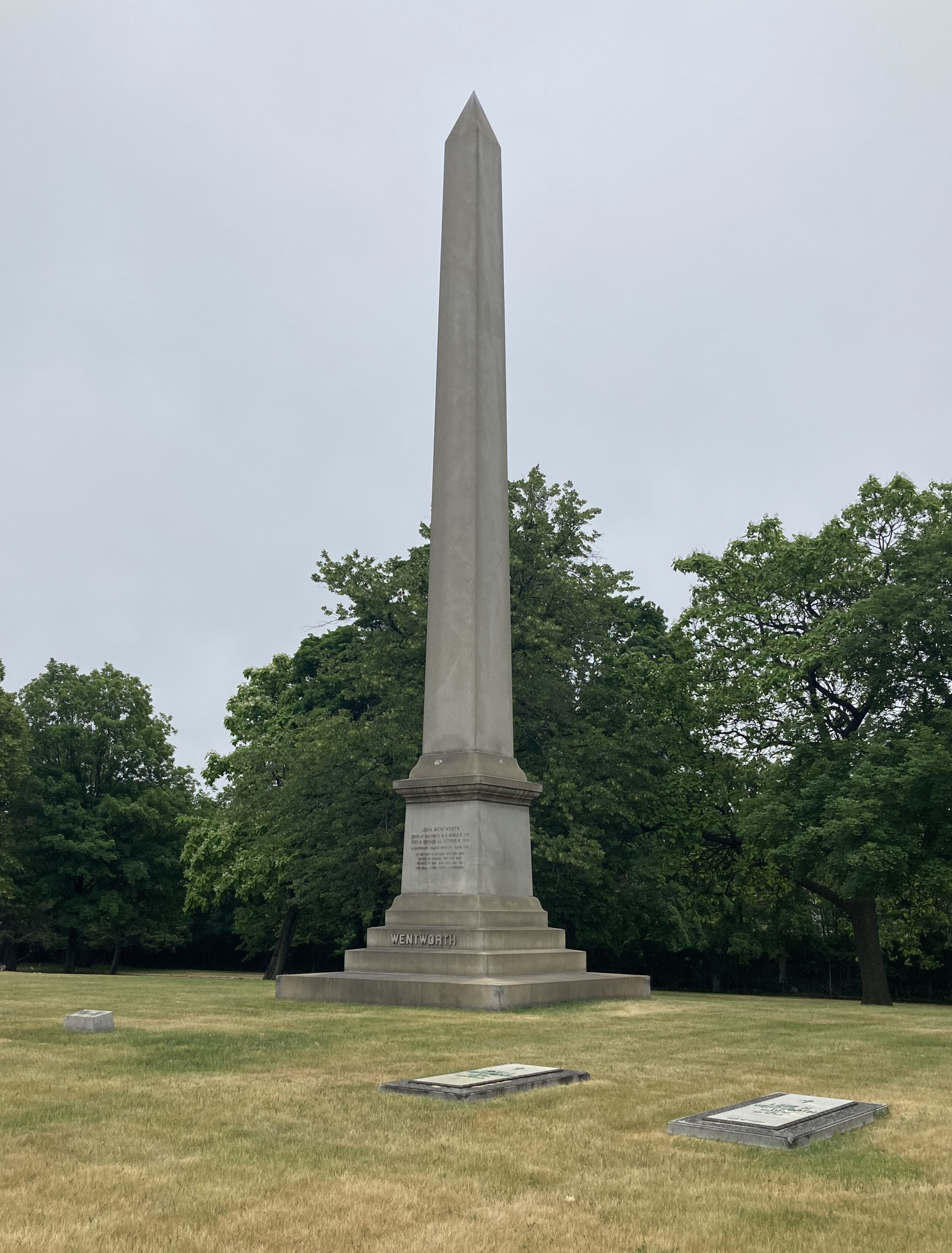
Wentworth's grave (front, center) at Rosehill Cemetery

While in the Illinois General Assembly, Wentworth introduced the successful statute which required compulsory school attendance in Illinois.

By 1896, Wentworth was associated with the Democratic Party, and was a gold Democrat delegate to the 1896 Democratic National Convention.

== Family ==
Wentworth was a nephew of "Long John" Wentworth, who served as a congressman and as mayor of Chicago. He handled his uncle's business affairs and estate.

On December 7, 1891, Wentworth married Lizzie Hunt Shaw. Together, they had two sons named John and Hunt.

== Death ==
Wentworth died at his home in Chicago on March 12, 1922, and was buried at Rosehill Cemetery. Wentworth left an estate valued at $1,500,000. His widow died on December 23. 1935.
