= Fawcett Plumb =

American banker and politician (1834–1919)

Member of the Illinois Senate from the 17th district
- In office 1874 – 1878
- Preceded by: Elmer Baldwin
- Succeeded by: Samuel R. Lewis

Personal details
- Born: December 10, 1834 Andover, Ohio
- Died: June 25, 1919 (aged 92) Streator, Illinois
- Party: Independent
- Profession: banker

Fawcett Plumb (December 10, 1834 – June 25, 1919) was an American banker and politician from Ohio. A graduate of Oberlin College, Plumb worked for many years as a secretary to his uncle and father-in-law, Ralph Plumb. Plumb briefly worked as a lawyer, but instead took interest in banking and real estate. He served two terms in the Illinois Senate as an independent.

== Biography ==
Fawcett Plumb was born in Andover, Ohio on December 10, 1834. His father was poor, so Plumb had to work on the family farm at a young age. He attended public schools before enrolling at Oberlin College. He returned to his family, joining the business of his uncle, Ralph Plumb, as secretary. Plumb studied law in Albany, New York and was admitted to the bar in 1867. He came to Pontiac, Illinois later that year, forming the law office of Fleming, Pilsburgy & Plumb. He practice for one year before moving to Streator to start a real estate business. Plumb co-founded the Streator National Bank in 1881 and became one of its first directors. He was elected president of the bank in 1891.

Plumb's other interests included the Streator Paving Brick Company and the Plumb Opera House. Plumb was an "independent Republican", generally supporting the Republican Party but unafraid to shift allegiances. He was elected as an independent to the Illinois Senate in 1874, serving two two-year terms. Plumb married his cousin Geraldine, the daughter of his uncle Ralph. After she died, Plumb married Ermina Ballard, who also died young. His third wife was Carrie Merry. He died at his home in Streator on June 25, 1919.
