= William A. James =

American politician (1838–1893)

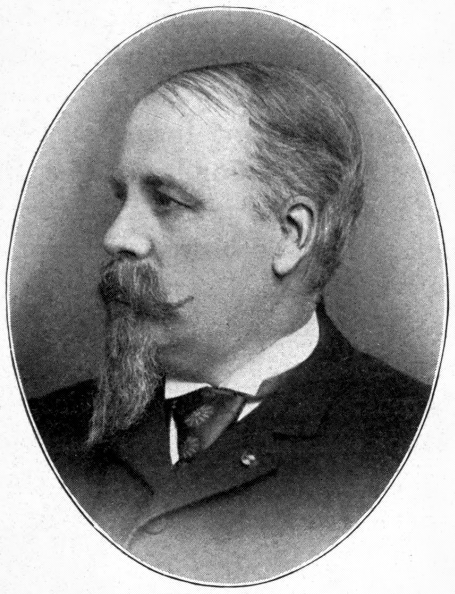

Speaker of the Illinois House of Representatives
- In office 1879–1880

Member of the Illinois House of Representatives
- In office 1874–1880

Mayor of Highland Park, Illinois
- In office 1873–1874

Personal details
- Born: William Andrew James; December 8, 1838 Providence, Rhode Island, US
- Died: December 31, 1893 (aged 55) Highland Park, Illinois, US
- Resting place: Lake Forest Cemetery
- Party: Republican
- Occupation: Military officer, politician

William Andrew James (December 8, 1838 - December 31, 1893) was an American politician and Republican member of the Illinois House of Representatives.

== Biography ==
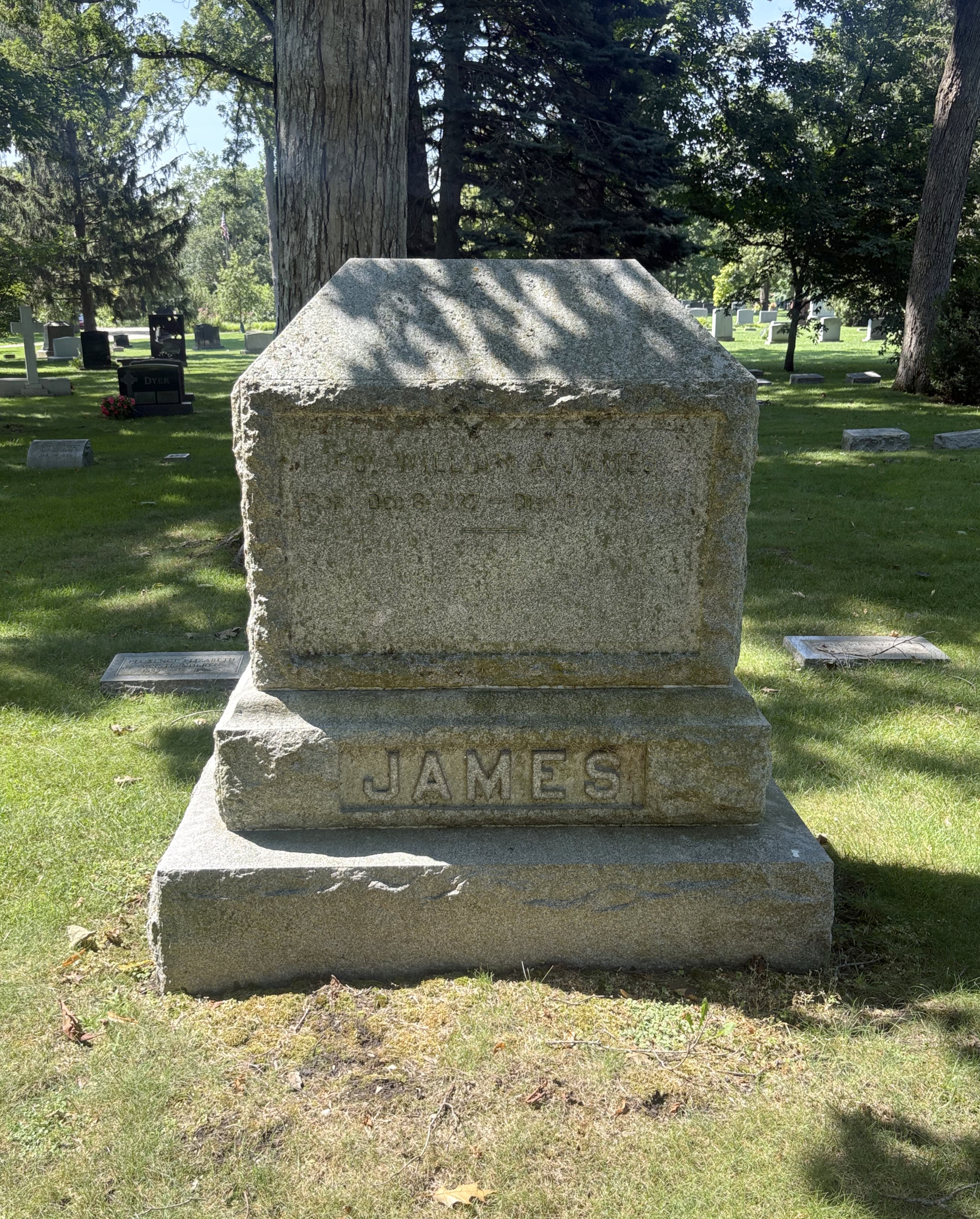
James's grave at Lake Forest Cemetery

William A. James was born December 8, 1838, in Providence, Rhode Island. He served in the American Civil War, reaching the rank of colonel in the Union Army. He moved to Chicago in 1865 and open a steam machinery business. After the Great Chicago Fire, he moved to Highland Park, Illinois. He was elected mayor in 1873.

He was elected to the Illinois House of Representatives in 1874 and served for three terms. He served as Speaker in his final term.

He died in Highland Park on December 31, 1893, and was buried at Lake Forest Cemetery.
