= James W. Robison =

American politician

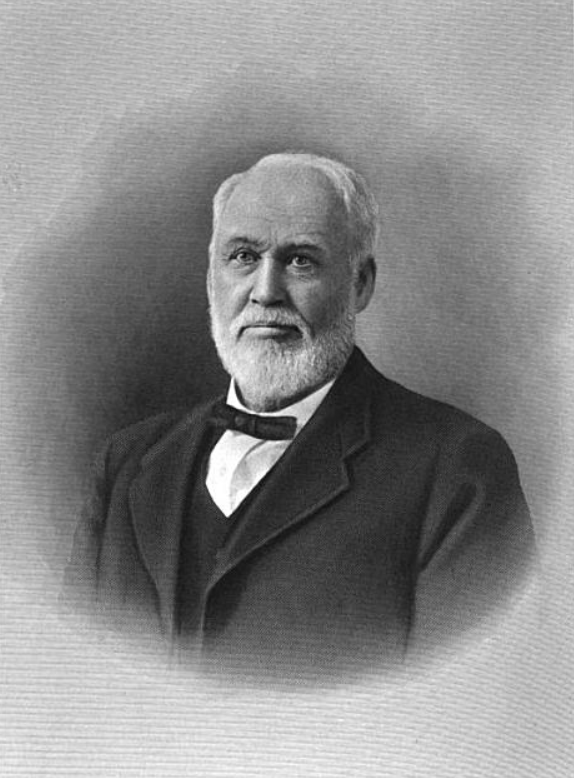

Member of the Illinois Senate from the 27th district
- In office 1874 – 1878
- Preceded by: Aaron B. Nicholson
- Succeeded by: Abram Mayfield

Personal details
- Born: James W. Robertston; March 19, 1831 Near Banff, Scotland, UK
- Died: July 2, 1909 (aged 78) Eldorado, Kansas
- Party: Republican
- Profession: Farmer, rancher
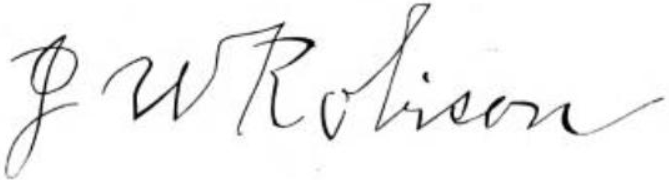
- Signature

James W. Robison (March 19, 1831 – July 2, 1909), born James W. Robertson, was a Scottish American farmer, horticulturist, politician, and horse breeder. After his family immigrated to the United States shortly after his birth, Robison attended public school and then studied at Illinois College. He became a wealthy farmer, particularly noted for his large orchards. He served two terms in the Illinois Senate in the 1870s. In 1879, he visited Kansas and established a farm in Butler County. The estate eventually amassed 17,000 acres (6,900 ha) and featured one of the largest Percheron ranches in the nation. Robison was elected to the Kansas Senate in 1897.

== Biography ==
James W. Robison was born near Banff, Scotland, on March 19, 1831, shortly before his family immigrated to the United States. He was the son of railroad contractor James Robertson, who worked on the Pontiac and Detroit Railway in Michigan and other lines in Illinois and Pennsylvania. In payment for his Illinois services, James Robertson was given a large plot of land in Tazewell County in 1835. He moved the family there to establish a farm. A clerical error gave these lands to "James Robison", so the family adopted the new spelling of the name.

James W. attended public school in Tremont, Illinois, then matriculated at Illinois College in Jacksonville. For the next thirty years, Robison managed a farm. He fruit orchards were so successful that he was nicknamed "Apple Robison". In 1874, he was elected to the Illinois Senate as a Republican and served two two-year terms.

Robison visited Kansas in 1879 and purchased a 3,840-acre (1,550 ha) tract of land in Butler County along the Whitewater River. He moved his family to Eldorado, Kansas, in 1884. He established his farm, Whitewater Falls, four miles north of Towanda. Robison was the first to grow alfalfa in the state and farmed large amounts of wheat. With no more orchards, locals aware of his previous nickname decided to instead call him "Wheat Robison". With his sons, he purchased an additional 13,000 acres (5,300 ha) for his estate. He began to breed horses in 1884, focusing on Percherons. By 1911, the Whitewater Falls Stock Farm was the largest Percheron farm in the United States. Robison moved to Eldorado in 1888. In 1897, he was elected to the Kansas Senate.

James W. Robison married Sarah A. Woodrow on March 27, 1860. They had nine children: Leslie W., James C., Frank L., Fred G., Elmer C., Edgar D., and three boys that died in infancy. Robison was a charter member of the Illinois State Horticultural Society, serving on its board of executives with one term as president. In 1901 he was elected to the Kansas railway commission, serving two years as its chairman of the board. He was a member of the Kansas State Board of Agriculture, served two terms as its president, and was its director at the time of his death. He co-founded the Kansas State Cattle Shippers' Association and served as its president. Robison was a co-founder of the Eldorado State Bank and served on the board of the Farmers' National Bank of Pekin, Illinois. Robison died from apoplexy in Eldorado on July 2, 1909, and was buried in Belle Vista Cemetery.
