= Evanston Township, Illinois =

Former township in Illinois, United States

Evanston Township
- Former Township
- The former boundaries of Evanston Township

- Flag Seal

- Location within Illinois
- Coordinates: 42°02′47″N 87°41′40″W
- Country: United States
- State: Illinois
- County: Cook
- Created: 1850
- Elevation: 614 ft (187 m)

Population (2010)
  - Total: 74,486
- Time zone: UTC-6 (CST)
  - Summer (DST): UTC-5 (CST)

Evanston Township was a civil township in Cook County, Illinois, United States from 1857 until 2014, when it was dissolved. At the time it was dissolved, its boundaries were coterminous with the city of Evanston, and the population at the 2010 census was 74,486.

The township history includes that of two townships that were both originally named Ridgeville Township and was later renamed Evanston Township.

== History ==
Loyola professor Patricia Melvin-Mooney states that a small community of German and Luxembourger farmers settled near the present-day intersection of Ridge and Devon Avenue in the 1830s, and the community became known as Ridgeville. Frances Willard in her 1891 history of Evanston associated the name with a log cabin, built in approximately 1835, southwest of what became Evanston, by former Major Edward Henry Mulford, the first jeweler in the area. The community was within the large and undefined voting district, north of the then-existing Chicago city limits, known as Gross Point.

Ridgeville Township came into existence in April 1850, with its first elections held on April 2, 1850. Some early records use the name Ridgevill for the township.

On April 26, 1850, the name of the Gross Point post office was changed to Ridgeville. The mail was received at Mulford's cabin, which had expanded to become a tavern known as Ten-Mile House for its distance from Chicago on the Green Bay stage route.

Ridgeville Township was organized as a civil township in approximately what are now the Lakeview, Uptown, Edgewater, and Rogers Park neighborhoods of Chicago, and also part of what is now Evanston, with the southern border in the Irving Park area at Irving Park Avenue bordering the current Graceland Cemetery, and the northern border at what is now Central Street in Evanston, which at that time marked the southern boundary of land reserved to Archange Ouilmette. The western boundary was Western Avenue, and the eastern boundary was Lake Michigan. In an election held at the house of George Reeley, the citizens elected Edward Murphy as the first township supervisor, and Philip Rogers as assessor. Gross Point voting district ceased to exist. Later elected officials included Chicagoan Conrad Sulzer, the first known European settler in the Ravenswood area, as township collector, and John Anderson, of what would later be called Andersonville, as highway commissioner.

As of the 1850 census the population was only 441. In the 1851 referendum on the Illinois banking law, only 19 voters came to the polls in Ridgeville Township.

In 1853, the Board of Trustees of Northwestern University purchased 380 acres (1.5 km^{2}) in the northern part of the township and proceeded to plat around the university campus a village, which, in 1854, they named Evanston after one of their leaders. The founding of the university and the extension of a railroad line that served it spurred rapid development in the Evanston community. In February 1855, the Post Office Department changed the name of the post office from Ridgeville to Evanston.

An Act of the Illinois General Assembly, on February 15, 1857, changed the township's name to Evanston Township, and redefined its boundaries. The township was split; and, for a short time, expanded to the north. The portion south of Devon Avenue became Lake View Township, and eventually part of Chicago. The part to the north remained as the renamed Evanston Township, and had added to it Archange Ouilmette's reservation on the north; but that reservation was detached and put into New Trier Township in 1859.

A new Ridgeville Township was created by an enabling act approved on May 23, 1877, and amended on May 15, 1903; the new township was coterminous the city limits of Evanston, leaving the remainder of Evanston Township outside the City of Evanston. Ridgeville Township ceased to exist after various annexations by the City of Evanston, concluding in 1916. Eventually this newer Ridgeville Township came itself be named Evanston Township.

Following special legislation enacted by the Illinois General Assembly in 2013, the electors of Evanston Township voted 5,065 to 2,889 on March 18, 2014, to abolish the township. On May 1, 2014, the city of Evanston assumed the duties and obligations of Evanston Township. Only twice before in Illinois history, and not since 1932, had a township been dissolved by public referendum. However, the Cook County Clerk still tabulates Evanston election results at the township level.

For a while the name Ridgeville was used for a street running along a north–south sand ridge in Rogers Park; the street was later renamed Paulina. A park district in the south part of Evanston retains the name Ridgeville.
