= John Glassford (cricketer) =

English cricketer

Personal information
- Full name: John Glassford
- Born: 20 July 1946 (age 80); Sunderland, County Durham, England
- Batting: Right-handed
- Bowling: Right-arm fast-medium

Domestic team information
- Years: Team
- 1969: Warwickshire
- 1968–1974: Durham

Career statistics
| Competition | First-class |
|---|---|
| Matches | 2 |
| Runs scored | 0 |
| Batting average | 0.00 |
| 100s/50s | –/– |
| Top score | 0 |
| Balls bowled | 348 |
| Wickets | 5 |
| Bowling average | 32.20 |
| 5 wickets in innings | – |
| 10 wickets in match | – |
| Best bowling | 2/9 |
| Catches/stumpings | 1/– |
- Source: Cricinfo, 7 September 2011

John Glassford (born 20 July 1946) is a former English cricketer. Glassford was a right-handed batsman who bowled right-arm fast-medium. He was born in Sunderland, County Durham.

Glassford made his debut for Durham in the 1968 Minor Counties Championship against the Warwickshire Second XI. In 1969, he played two first-class matches for Warwickshire against Cambridge University and Scotland. In these two matches, he took a total of 5 wickets at an average of 32.20, with best figures of 2/9. He continued to play for Durham on an infrequent basis over the following seasons, making seven further Minor Counties Championship appearances, the last of which came against Shropshire in 1974.
