= Inverness, Illinois =

- Village
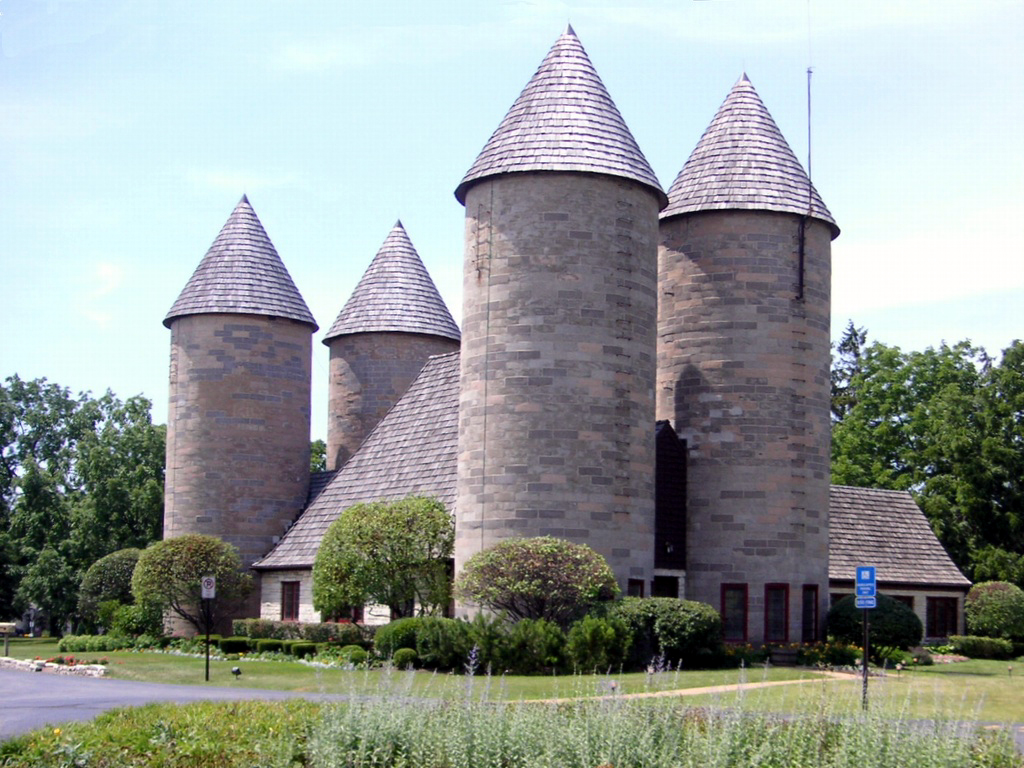
- Inverness Village Hall

- Flag logo
- Motto: "The village with a heritage"
- Location of Inverness in Cook County, Illinois.

- Location within Greater Chicago Location within Illinois Location within the United States
- Coordinates: 42°6′47″N 88°5′54″W
- Country: United States
- State: Illinois
- County: Cook
- Township: Palatine

Area
  - Total: 6.69 sq mi (17.33 km^{2})
  - Land: 6.53 sq mi (16.92 km^{2})
  - Water: 0.15 sq mi (0.40 km^{2})

Population (2020)
  - Total: 7,616
  - Density: 1,165.5/sq mi (450.01/km^{2})
- Time zone: UTC-6 (CST)
  - Summer (DST): UTC-5 (CDT)
- ZIP Code(s): 60067, 60010
- Area code(s): 847, 224
- FIPS code: 17-37608
- Website: inverness-il.gov

Inverness is a suburban village in Cook County, Illinois, United States. Per the 2020 census, the population was 7,616.

== History ==
The Inverness area was settled in 1836 by George Ela and became known as Deer Grove. After surveying the township area, in 1840 the US government offered land in the area for $1.25 per acre. By 1854, rail service was established to Deer Grove, and in 1859 the line was incorporated into the Chicago and North Western Railway system. The Inverness area was then easily accessible to Chicago. The frontier had been opened.

In 1926, Mr. Arthur T. McIntosh, one of Chicago's leading land developers, bought the Temple farm and house, which was had been built by Ralph Atkinson. It was the first of eleven parcels that he acquired. These lands, combined with the acquisition of the Cudahy Company Golf Course, comprised 1,500 contiguous acres (6,100,000 m^{2}) for development. With the area under McIntosh's control, it became known as Inverness, after the McIntosh clan home in Scotland.

An important person during this early development was Way Thompson, who preserved the natural beauty of the area by laying out the road system to take advantage of the rolling land and by subdividing lots to conform to natural contours. A minimum lot size of 1-acre (4,000 m^{2}) was established. Thompson also approved all house plans and their position on the lots. The first ten homes were even decorated by his wife, Barbara. The first new homes were occupied by 1939. These homes were mostly situated around the edge of the Inverness Golf Club and were designed to be affordable to young couples. They were priced from $9,500 to $20,000. McIntosh built the first 20 homes. After that, the homes were custom built for individuals who purchased lots from McIntosh.

Construction in Inverness was halted during World War II. During the early post-war years, the McIntosh Company had complete control over the sale of lots as well as the resale of homes. Placement of homes was carefully controlled to protect the character of the community.

In 1962, Inverness incorporated as a village governed by a president and board of trustees. The first meeting of the village board was July 5, 1962 at the Field House, then at the western edge of the village. In the spring of 1977 the Village Hall was relocated to a 100-year-old farmhouse on Palatine Road. It was again relocated in 1985 to the Four Silos, which had become a famous landmark and gateway to the community.

During the 1970s and '80s, the village continued to grow at a pace that exceeded earlier predictions. Homes became larger and styles more varied. It was also during this period that the village annexed large areas of existing homes in unincorporated Cook County, which laid the foundation for further annexations to the west, continuing to expand the village limits. Williamsburg Village, the only business development in Inverness, began in 1981.

== Geography ==
Inverness is located at 42°6′47″N 88°5′54″W (42.113275, -88.098433).

According to the 2021 census gazetteer files, Inverness has a total area of 6.69 square miles (17.33 km^{2}), of which 6.53 square miles (16.91 km^{2}) (or 97.68%) is land and 0.16 square miles (0.41 km^{2}) (or 2.32%) is water.

The village borders are defined by Barrington Road to the west, Roselle Road to the east, Algonquin Road to the south, and Dundee Road to the north.

== Demographics ==
Historical population
Census	Pop.	Note	%±
1970	1,674		—
1980	4,046		141.7%
1990	6,503		60.7%
2000	6,749		3.8%
2010	7,399		9.6%
2020	7,616		2.9%
U.S. Decennial Census; 2010 2020

=== Racial and ethnic composition ===
Inverness village, Illinois – Racial and ethnic composition Note: the US Census treats Hispanic/Latino as an ethnic category. This table excludes Latinos from the racial categories and assigns them to a separate category. Hispanics/Latinos may be of any race.
Race / Ethnicity (NH = Non-Hispanic)	Pop 2000	Pop 2010	Pop 2020	% 2000	% 2010	% 2020
White alone (NH)	6,110	6,249	5,867	90.53%	84.46%	77.04%
Black or African American alone (NH)	45	36	39	0.67%	0.49%	0.51%
Native American or Alaska Native alone (NH)	6	0	1	0.09%	0.00%	0.01%
Asian alone (NH)	420	828	1,207	6.22%	11.19%	15.85%
Pacific Islander alone (NH)	6	3	3	0.09%	0.04%	0.04%
Other race alone (NH)	7	2	32	0.10%	0.03%	0.42%
Mixed race or Multiracial (NH)	27	103	205	0.40%	1.39%	2.69%
Hispanic or Latino (any race)	128	178	262	1.90%	2.41%	3.44%
Total	6,749	7,399	7,616	100.00%	100.00%	100.00%

=== 2020 census ===
As of the 2020 census, Inverness had a population of 7,616. The median age was 50.8 years. 20.4% of residents were under the age of 18 and 27.5% were 65 years of age or older. For every 100 females, there were 98.7 males, and for every 100 females age 18 and over, there were 96.2 males age 18 and over.

100.0% of residents lived in urban areas, while 0.0% lived in rural areas.

There were 2,725 households, of which 30.5% had children under the age of 18 living in them. Of all households, 75.6% were married-couple households, 8.7% were households with a male householder and no spouse or partner present, and 13.4% were households with a female householder and no spouse or partner present. About 13.7% of all households were made up of individuals, and 9.5% had someone living alone who was 65 years of age or older.

There were 2,883 housing units, of which 5.5% were vacant. The homeowner vacancy rate was 1.8% and the rental vacancy rate was 3.4%.

=== Income and poverty ===
The median income for a household in the village was $185,558, and the median income for a family was $204,056. Males had a median income of $134,300 versus $59,861 for females. The per capita income for the village was $82,512. About 0.9% of families and 2.6% of the population were below the poverty line, including none of those under age 18 and 1.7% of those age 65 or over.

== Education ==
Public schools are managed by either Barrington District 220 or School District 15 and Township High School District 211 . The village is also home to the Holy Family Catholic Academy. Established in 2002, the academy is a Catholic school, part of the Roman Catholic Archdiocese of Chicago, that educates around 300 students in grades PK-8.
