= Barrington Township, Illinois =

Barrington Township
- Township
- Logo

- Location in Cook County

- Cook County's location in Illinois
- Coordinates: 42°06′41″N 88°10′46″W
- Country: United States
- State: Illinois
- County: Cook
- Organized: 1850

Government
  - Supervisor: D. Robert Alberding
  - Clerk: Daniel P. Fitzgerald
  - Assessor: Mike Gentile
  - Trustees: Michael J. Deering; Vince Deligio; John J. Langan; Dan LeTourneau

Area
  - Total: 36.0 sq mi (93.3 km^{2})
  - Land: 34.8 sq mi (90.2 km^{2})
  - Water: 1.2 sq mi (3.0 km^{2}) 3.26%
- Elevation: 883 ft (269 m)

Population (2020)
  - Total: 16,514
  - Density: 474/sq mi (183/km^{2})
- Time zone: UTC-6 (CST)
  - Summer (DST): UTC-5 (CDT)
- ZIP codes: 60010, 60118, 60192, 60195
- FIPS code: 17-03831
- GNIS feature ID: 428638
- Website: barringtontwpil.gov

Barrington Township is one of 29 townships in Cook County, Illinois, USA. As of the 2020 census, its population was 16,514 and it contained 6,172 housing units. The northwestern corner of the Cook County panhandle, it is the county's northwesternmost township. Its boundaries are the McHenry and Lake County lines on the north, Freeman Road extended north on the east, Interstate 90 on the south, and the Kane County line on the west. It is also by far the least densely populated township in the county, with less than half the population density of the next least-populated, Lemont Township.

Barrington Township was named after the town of Great Barrington, Massachusetts. It was organized in 1850.

== Geography ==
According to the United States Census Bureau, Barrington Township covers an area of 36.0 square miles (93.3 km^{2}); of this, 34.8 square miles (90.2 km^{2}) is land and 1.2 square miles (3.0 km^{2}) (3.26 percent) is water.

=== Borders ===
Barrington Township is bordered on the north by Algonquin Township in McHenry County and Cuba Township in Lake County, on the east by Palatine Township, on the south by Hanover Township and Schaumburg Township, and on the west by Dundee Township in Kane County.

=== Cities, towns, villages ===
- Barrington (mostly)
- Barrington Hills (south three-quarters)
- East Dundee (small part)
- Hoffman Estates (part)
- Inverness (west quarter)
- South Barrington

=== Unincorporated towns ===
- Barrington Center at 42.11058°N 88.194244°W
- Middlebury at 42.144192°N 88.238136°W
- Sutton at 42.09586°N 88.194244°W

=== Cemeteries ===
The township contains two historic cemeteries: Barrington Center and Union.

=== Major highways ===
- Interstate 90
- U.S. Route 14
- Illinois Route 59
- Illinois Route 62
- Illinois Route 68
- Illinois Route 72

=== Airports and landing strips ===
- Allstate Commercial Plaza Heliport
- Mill Rose Farm RLA Airport
- Rose Number 2 Heliport

=== Lakes ===
- Beverly Lake
- Crabtree Lake
- Dana Lake
- Goose Lake
- Hawley Lake
- Hawthorne Lake
- Heather Lake
- Keene Lake
- Lacey Lake
- Mirror Lake
- Mud Lake
- Spring Lake
- Stephanie Lake

=== Landmarks ===
- Barrington Forest Preserve (west quarter)
- Cook County-Potawatomi Woods Forest Preserve
- Crabtree Nature Center (Cook County Forest Preserve)
- Prairie Stone Business Park

== Demographics ==
As of the 2020 census there were 16,514 people, 5,456 households, and 4,718 families residing in the township. The population density was 458.34 inhabitants per square mile (176.97/km^{2}). There were 6,172 housing units at an average density of 171.30 units per square mile (66.14 units/km^{2}). The racial makeup of the township was 69.20% White, 0.85% African American, 0.09% Native American, 22.83% Asian, 0.00% Pacific Islander, 1.68% from other races, and 5.34% from two or more races. Hispanic or Latino of any race were 5.30% of the population.

There were 5,456 households, out of which 39.40% had children under the age of 18 living with them, 73.20% were married couples living together, 10.85% had a female householder with no spouse present, and 13.53% were non-families. 11.90% of all households were made up of individuals, and 6.20% had someone living alone who was 65 years of age or older. The average household size was 2.89 and the average family size was 3.12.

The township's age distribution consisted of 26.9% under the age of 18, 4.3% from 18 to 24, 16.1% from 25 to 44, 32.6% from 45 to 64, and 20.1% who were 65 years of age or older. The median age was 46.8 years. For every 100 females, there were 88.1 males. For every 100 females age 18 and over, there were 85.1 males.

The median income for a household in the township was $145,611, and the median income for a family was $161,684. Males had a median income of $106,099 versus $60,556 for females. The per capita income for the township was $67,213. About 3.6% of families and 5.0% of the population were below the poverty line, including 6.1% of those under age 18 and 6.0% of those age 65 or over.

Historical population
Census	Pop.	Note	%±
2000	14,026		—
2010	15,636		11.5%
2020	16,514		5.6%
U.S. Decennial Census

== School districts ==
- Barrington Community Unit School District 220
- Community Unit School District 300
- School District 46

== Politics ==
Barrington Township is closely divided politically; in the 2024 presidential election, Democrat Kamala Harris won the township over Republican Donald Trump by just 87 votes for a margin of 50%-49%, almost identical to the margins in the township's two Congressional races, in which Democrats led by 95 votes for a margin of 51%-49%.

=== Political districts ===
- Illinois's 5th congressional district
- Illinois's 8th congressional district
- State House District 52
- State House District 54
- State Senate District 26
- State Senate District 27
