= Jefferson Township, Cook County, Illinois =

Former township in Cook County, Illinois

Jefferson Township
- Former Township
- Map showing Jefferson Township's original borders
- Interactive map of Jefferson Township
- Coordinates: 41.9583649°N 87.7503367°W
- Country: United States
- State: Illinois
- County: Cook
- Organized: 1850
- Elevation: 614 ft (187 m)
- Time zone: UTC-6 (CST)
  - Summer (DST): UTC-5 (CDT)
- GNIS feature ID: 426940

Jefferson Township is a former civil township in Cook County, Illinois, United States that was established in 1850 and annexed into the city of Chicago in 1889. In 1874, the northwest corner of Jefferson Park and parts of adjacent townships were separated into the new Norwood Park Township. Chicago residents voted to abolish township governments and transfer their functions to the city in 1902. During its brief history it developed from unpopulated wilderness to a largely rural community with a number of suburban villages. However, due to infrastructure limitations, legislative incentives and the lure of better municipal services it, along with numerous adjoining townships, agreed to be annexed into the city of Chicago, creating the largest city in the United States at that time.

== Description ==
Jefferson Township was a farming settlement located 12 miles northwest of downtown Chicago. It was also the site of the Cook County Poor Farm from 1851 to 1912. Its borders were Devon Avenue on the north, Harlem Avenue on the west, Western Avenue to the east, and North Avenue to the south. This region comprised most of what is now known as the Chicago's Northwest Side including the entirety of the following community areas: Jefferson Park, Albany Park, Irving Park, Avondale, Hermosa, Belmont-Cragin, Montclare, Portage Park, as well as parts of Forest Glen, West Ridge, Lincoln Square, North Center, Logan Square, West Town, Humboldt Park, Austin, Dunning, the suburb of Norridge, the suburb of Harwood Heights, and Norwood Park.

== History ==
Jefferson Township existed from 1850 to 1889. It comprised the area west of Western Avenue between North Avenue and Devon Avenue. This farming area that would later become Jefferson Township was first settled by John Kinzie Clark in 1830. After the 1833 Treaty of Chicago between the U.S. government and the Ojibwe, Odawa, and Potawatomi tribes, the land northwest of Chicago became available for further settlement. New settlers included John Noble, Peter Ludby and David S. Dunning. In 1850, a township was established and named Jefferson Township. The 1850 census of the area listed the population as 744. Later, the village in the center of the township was also named Jefferson. The town of Jefferson later became the community of Jefferson Park. Jefferson village was a market town and transportation hub for local farmers. It was also a convenient stopping place for travelers to and from Chicago. The Dickinson Tavern was built at the present intersection of Milwaukee and Belle Plaine avenues. Jefferson Township was incorporated at the Dickinson Tavern in 1850, and the tavern served as the town hall and post office. The Dickinson Tavern was demolished in 1929 to make way for a paint store.

=== County Poor Farm and Insane Asylum ===
Cook County Poor Farm, c. 1890s

In 1851, the Cook County Board of Commissioners purchased 160 acres from Peter Ludby in Jefferson Township as the location for the city's new Poorhouse and Insane Asylum. The proximity of Jefferson to a major road and distance from downtown Chicago, was an important consideration in the county board's choice. Initially, both facilities, together known as the Cook County Poor Farm, were housed in a new three-story brick building. After 1855, the complex expanded to support tuberculosis patients, and a hospital was built in 1863. In 1870, the county built a separate building for the insane asylum. In the 1880s, additional buildings were added to support more than 1000 patients, including a schoolhouse for the Poorhouse children. By 1882, overcrowding challenged the county's ability to fund and manage the growing population at the Poor Farm. In 1912, the county officially transferred the Poor Farm property to the State of Illinois.

=== Jefferson Township villages ===
The first post office established in Jefferson Township was the Jefferson post office established in 1846. The names and dates of establishment of later post offices are: Irving Park (1872), Maplewood (1872), Mont Clare (1873), Pacific (1877), Humboldt Park (1878), Avondale (1880), Mayfair (1882), Cragin (1882), Dunning (1883), Bandow (1884), Forest Glen (1884), Bowmanville (1884), Hermosa (1885), Simons (1886), and Edison Park (1890). All the Jefferson Township post offices were discontinued between 1894 and 1911 after the township was annexed to the city of Chicago in 1889. In 1872, an area was carved out of the northwest corner of Jefferson Township and became Norwood Park Township. During the 1880s, there was a surge in interest by the residents in Jefferson for new and better services in their community, including water and sewer services, police and fire protection, and sidewalks. In June 1880, voters approved annexation to Chicago of the Township of Jefferson.

The township has no current governmental structure or functions, other than being used by the Cook County Assessor's office for taxation valuation and record keeping purposes.
