= Opposition Party (Illinois) =

The Opposition Party in Illinois was a political label used in 1874, when it was adopted by a coalition of all groups opposed to Republican Party rule in Chicago and Cook County. The Opposition Party opposed temperance laws and the alleged corruption of the Republican machine and incorporated both Democrats and more radical political elements. Several members were elected to the 29th Illinois General Assembly on the Opposition Party ticket in the election of 1874; these included Moses J. Wentworth in the 1st district, William H. Stickney in the 6th district, and William H. Skelly in the 7th district. The coalition was not successful at the local level, and did not appear in subsequent elections.
