= Calumet Township, Illinois =

Calumet Township
- Township
- Seal

- Location in Cook County

- Cook County's location in Illinois
- Coordinates: 41°39′28″N 87°39′13″W
- Country: United States
- State: Illinois
- County: Cook
- Organized: 1862

Government
  - Supervisor: Bob Rita
  - Clerk: LaTroy Robinson
  - Assessor: Angel Infante
  - Trustees: Rosalind Priest; Mark Patoska; Johnathan Shaw

Area
  - Total: 4.7 sq mi (12.1 km^{2})
  - Land: 4.4 sq mi (11.4 km^{2})
  - Water: 0.27 sq mi (0.7 km^{2}) 5.79%
- Elevation: 597 ft (182 m)

Population (2020)
  - Total: 18,609
  - Density: 4,230/sq mi (1,630/km^{2})
- Time zone: UTC-6 (CST)
  - Summer (DST): UTC-5 (CDT)
- ZIP codes: 60406, 60827
- FIPS code: 17-10474
- GNIS feature ID: 428750
- Website: calumettownshipil.com

Calumet Township is one of 29 townships in Cook County, Illinois, United States. As of the 2020 census, its population was 18,609 and it contained 8,210 housing units.

== Geography ==
According to the United States Census Bureau, Calumet Township covers an area of 4.7 square miles (12.1 km^{2}); of this, 4.4 square miles (11.4 km^{2}), or 94.21 percent, is land and 0.27 square miles (0.7 km^{2}), or 5.79 percent, is water.

=== Cities, towns, villages ===
- Blue Island (northeastern section)
- Calumet Park
- Chicago (small part of Riverdale neighborhood)
- Riverdale (northern half)

=== Adjacent townships ===
- Thornton Township (southeast)
- Bremen Township (southwest)
- Worth Township (west)

=== Cemeteries ===
The township contains Cedar Park Cemetery.

=== Major highways ===
- Interstate 57
- Illinois Route 1

=== Rivers ===
- Little Calumet River

=== Landmarks ===
- Calumet Woods (Cook County Forest Preserves)
- Whistler Preserve (Cook County Forest Preserves)

== Demographics ==
Calumet Township, Illinois – Racial and ethnic composition Note: the US Census treats Hispanic/Latino as an ethnic category. This table excludes Latinos from the racial categories and assigns them to a separate category. Hispanics/Latinos may be of any race.
Race / Ethnicity (NH = Non-Hispanic)	Pop 2000	Pop 2010	Pop 2020	% 2000	% 2010	% 2020
White alone (NH)	4,008	2,102	1,397	17.91%	10.12%	7.51%
Black or African American alone (NH)	12,822	12,832	11,029	57.31%	61.76%	59.66%
Native American or Alaska Native alone (NH)	36	20	32	0.16%	0.10%	0.17%
Asian alone (NH)	43	53	42	0.19%	0.26%	0.23%
Native Hawaiian or Pacific Islander alone (NH)	4	3	2	0.02%	0.01%	0.01%
Other race alone (NH)	27	27	77	0.12%	0.13%	0.41%
Mixed race or Multiracial (NH)	252	172	274	1.13%	0.83%	1.47%
Hispanic or Latino (any race)	5,182	5,568	5,683	23.16%	26.80%	30.54%
Total	22,374	20,777	18,609	100.00%	100.00%	100.00%

As of the 2020 census there were 18,609 people, 7,590 households, and 4,797 families residing in the township. The population density was 3,975.43 inhabitants per square mile (1,534.92/km^{2}). There were 8,210 housing units at an average density of 1,753.90 per square mile (677.18/km^{2}). The racial makeup of the township was 11.52% White, 60.22% African American, 1.30% Native American, 0.26% Asian, 0.06% Pacific Islander, 15.62% from other races, and 11.01% from two or more races. Hispanic or Latino of any race were 30.54% of the population.

There were 7,590 households, out of which 31.30% had children under the age of 18 living with them, 26.93% were married couples living together, 26.90% had a female householder with no spouse present, and 36.80% were non-families. 32.90% of all households were made up of individuals, and 11.00% had someone living alone who was 65 years of age or older. The average household size was 2.66 and the average family size was 3.48.

The township's age distribution consisted of 23.1% under the age of 18, 10.9% from 18 to 24, 25.6% from 25 to 44, 26% from 45 to 64, and 14.4% who were 65 years of age or older. The median age was 39.6 years. For every 100 females, there were 91.6 males. For every 100 females age 18 and over, there were 91.5 males.

The median income for a household in the township was $48,012, and the median income for a family was $59,016. Males had a median income of $31,522 versus $30,942 for females. The per capita income for the township was $23,215. About 13.6% of families and 19.0% of the population were below the poverty line, including 25.3% of those under age 18 and 17.3% of those age 65 or over.

Historical population
Census	Pop.	Note	%±
2000	22,374		—
2010	20,777		−7.1%
2020	18,609		−10.4%
U.S. Decennial Census

== Political districts ==
- Illinois's 1st congressional district
- State House District 27
- State House District 28
- State House District 30
- State Senate District 14
- State Senate District 15
