= Samuel M. Glassford =

American politician

Samuel McFadden Glassford

Member of the Illinois Senate from the 51st district
- In office 1874 – 1878
- Preceded by: Charles M. Perrell
- Succeeded by: Andrew J. Kuykendall

Personal details
- Born: November 15, 1825 Indiana County, Pennsylvania
- Died: October 3, 1914 (aged 76) Johnson County, Illinois
- Party: Independent
- Profession: Farmer, miner

Samuel McFadden Glassford (November 15, 1825 – February 8, 1901) was an American politician from Pennsylvania. Raised in Kentucky, Glassford followed his family to farm in Johnson County, Illinois. He then followed his father to St. Louis, Missouri where Glassford engaged first in the sugar trade, then purchased some coal mines. He returned to the family farm in Illinois in 1860 and amassed a large estate. He served two terms in the Illinois Senate in the 1870s.

== Biography ==
Samuel McFadden Glassford was born in Indiana County, Pennsylvania on November 15, 1825. When he was eight years old, his family moved to Mason County, Kentucky; his father George had opened a blacksmith shop in May's Lick. Glassford attended public schools there until 1841, when the family moved to Johnson County, Illinois near Vienna. In 1849, he left for St. Louis, Missouri, where his father had moved three years earlier. There, Glassford worked for sugar refiners Belcher & Brothers. Glassford purchased their coal mining interests from the controlling family and focused the rest of his career on the coal trade.

In 1860, Glassford sold his interest in coal to his brother John, then retired to the family farm in Elvira, Illinois. He had inherited a share of the farm from his parents and bought out the portions granted to the other heirs. He continued to accumulate land for the farm until his estate totaled approximately 1,500 acres (610 ha). In 1861, he partnered with his brother to build a flour and woolen mill in Vienna. However, shortly before the mill was put into motion, it burned down for a loss of about $40,000. In the ensuing years, Glassford became a staunch prohibitionist. In 1874, he was elected to the Illinois Senate, where he served two consecutive two-year terms as an independent.

Glassford married Elizabeth Jones in 1846, but she died a few years later. In 1851, Glassford married her sister, Juliet Jones. They had three children together: Josephine, Charles A., and Mary E. The Glassfords were members of the Christian Church. Samuel M. Glassford died near Vienna on February 8, 1901 and was buried in the Old Oliver Cemetery.
