= Palatine Township, Illinois =

Palatine Township
- Township
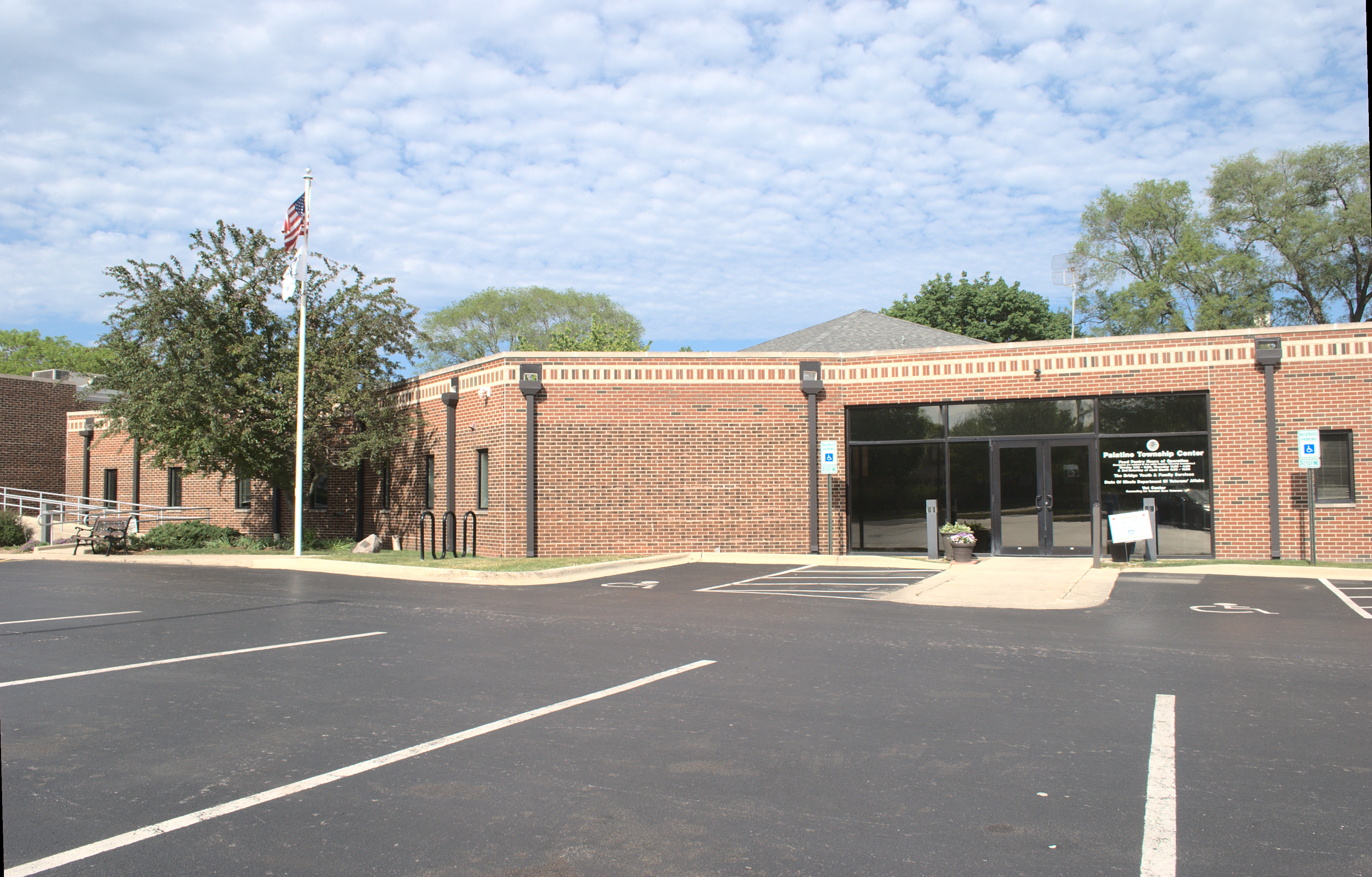
- Palatine Township Center

- Flag Seal
- Motto: People Helping People
- Location in Cook County

- Cook County's location in Illinois
- Coordinates: 42°06′38″N 88°03′47″W
- Country: United States
- State: Illinois
- County: Cook

Area
  - Total: 36.04 sq mi (93.34 km^{2})
  - Land: 35.69 sq mi (92.44 km^{2})
  - Water: 0.35 sq mi (0.9 km^{2}) 0.96%
- Elevation: 748 ft (228 m)

Population (2020)
  - Total: 114,403
  - Density: 3,205/sq mi (1,238/km^{2})
- Time zone: UTC-6 (CST)
  - Summer (DST): UTC-5 (CDT)
- ZIP codes: 60004, 60005, 60008, 60010, 60067, 60074, 60173, 60195
- FIPS code: 17-031-57238
- Website: palatinetownship-il.gov

Palatine Township is one of 29 townships in Cook County, Illinois, United States. As of the 2020 census, its population was 114,403. It is the north central township of the six northwest townships that form the Cook County panhandle. Palatine Township was organized in 1850.

== Geography ==
According to the United States Census Bureau, Palatine Township covers an area of 36.04 square miles (93.3 km^{2}); of this, 35.69 square miles (92.4 km^{2}) (99.04 percent) is land and 0.35 square miles (0.91 km^{2}) (0.96 percent) is water.

=== Cities, towns, villages ===
- Arlington Heights (Portions west of Wilke Road, like Arlington Park)
- Barrington
- Deer Park
- Hoffman Estates Northeast area
- Inverness
- Palatine
- Rolling Meadows (north of Central Road)
- Schaumburg
- South Barrington

=== Adjacent townships ===
- Ela Township, Lake County (north)
- Vernon Township, Lake County (northeast)
- Wheeling Township (east)
- Elk Grove Township (southeast)
- Schaumburg Township (south)
- Barrington Township (west)
- Cuba Township, Lake County (northwest)

=== Cemeteries ===
The township contains these cemeteries: Cady, Circle of Life, Deer Grove, German, Hillside, Immanuel Lutheran, Mount Hope, Saint Michael, Salem, Sutherland and Wolfum. Of these, the Township owns Cady, Hillside, Salem, Sutherland and Wolfum.

=== Major highways ===
- U.S. Route 12
- U.S. Route 14
- Illinois Route 53
- Illinois Route 62
- Illinois Route 68

=== Lakes ===
- Baker Lake
- Deer Grove Lake
- Deer Lake
- Hidden Lake
- Inverness Lake
- Lake Irene
- Lake Louise
- Lake Rossiter
- Shadow Lake
- Virginia Lake
- Peregrine Lake

=== Landmarks ===
- Barrington Forest Preserve (east three-quarters)
- Deer Grove Forest Preserve
- William Rainey Harper College
- Arlington Park

== Demographics ==
As of the 2020 census there were 114,403 people, 43,469 households, and 29,301 families residing in the township. The population density was 3,169.50 inhabitants per square mile (1,223.75/km^{2}). There were 47,408 housing units at an average density of 1,313.42 per square mile (507.11/km^{2}). The racial makeup of the township was 63.47% White, 3.03% African American, 0.71% Native American, 15.09% Asian, 0.03% Pacific Islander, 8.60% from other races, and 9.06% from two or more races. Hispanic or Latino of any race were 17.71% of the population.

There were 43,469 households, out of which 31.80% had children under the age of 18 living with them, 52.31% were married couples living together, 10.66% had a female householder with no spouse present, and 32.59% were non-families. 25.90% of all households were made up of individuals, and 9.40% had someone living alone who was 65 years of age or older. The average household size was 2.56 and the average family size was 3.12.

The township's age distribution consisted of 24.0% under the age of 18, 5.8% from 18 to 24, 28.2% from 25 to 44, 27.4% from 45 to 64, and 14.7% who were 65 years of age or older. The median age was 38.6 years. For every 100 females, there were 93.9 males. For every 100 females age 18 and over, there were 96.7 males.

The median income for a household in the township was $92,796, and the median income for a family was $113,903. Males had a median income of $61,860 versus $42,362 for females. The per capita income for the township was $47,498. About 5.4% of families and 8.0% of the population were below the poverty line, including 14.2% of those under age 18 and 3.6% of those age 65 or over.

Historical population
Census	Pop.	Note	%±
2000	112,740		—
2010	112,994		0.2%
2020	114,403		1.2%
U.S. Decennial Census

== Government ==
Supervisor
Andy-John G. Kalkounos
Clerk
A. Christine Svenson
Assessor
Bill Pohlman
Highway Commissioner
Aaron Del Mar
Trustees
Michael C. Smolka
John M. Freese
James Sloan
Natalie Sahinoglu

== Political districts ==
- Illinois's 8th congressional district
- Illinois's 6th congressional district
- State House District 51
- State House District 54
- State House District 56
- State House District 57
- State House District 66
- State Senate District 26
- State Senate District 27
- State Senate District 28
- State Senate District 29
- State Senate District 33
