= Wheeling Township, Illinois =

Wheeling Township
- Township
- Seal

- Location in Cook County

- Cook County's location in Illinois
- Coordinates: 42°06′37″N 87°56′51″W
- Country: United States
- State: Illinois
- County: Cook

Government
  - Supervisor: Maria Zeller Brauer (D)

Area
  - Total: 36.03 sq mi (93.3 km^{2})
  - Land: 35.91 sq mi (93.0 km^{2})
  - Water: 0.12 sq mi (0.31 km^{2}) 0.34%
- Elevation: 673 ft (205 m)

Population (2020)
  - Total: 157,487
  - Density: 4,386/sq mi (1,693/km^{2})
- Time zone: UTC-6 (CST)
  - Summer (DST): UTC-5 (CDT)
- ZIP codes: 60004, 60005, 60008, 60016, 60025, 60056, 60062, 60067, 60070, 60089, 60090
- FIPS code: 17-031-81100
- Website: www.wheelingtownship.com

Wheeling Township is one of 29 townships in Cook County, Illinois, USA. As of the 2020 census, its population was 157,487. It is the northeasternmost and most populated of the six northwest Cook County townships that form the panhandle.

== Geography ==
According to the 2021 census gazetteer files, Wheeling Township has a total area of 36.03 square miles (93.32 km^{2}), of which 35.91 square miles (93.01 km^{2}) (or 99.66%) is land and 0.12 square miles (0.31 km^{2}) (or 0.34%) is water.

=== Cities, towns, villages ===
- Arlington Heights (vast majority)
- Buffalo Grove (only part in Cook County)
- Des Plaines (northwestern edge)
- Glenview (western edge)
- Mount Prospect (northern edge)
- Northbrook (western edge)
- Palatine (east of Hwy 53)
- Prospect Heights (vast majority)
- Rolling Meadows
- Wheeling (vast majority)

=== Adjacent townships ===
- Vernon Township, Lake County (north)
- West Deerfield Township, Lake County (northeast)
- Northfield Township (east)
- Maine Township (southeast)
- Elk Grove Township (south)
- Palatine Township (west)
- Ela Township, Lake County (northwest)

=== Cemeteries ===
The township contains these seven cemeteries: English, Memory Gardens, Randhill Park, Saint Marys, Saint Pauls Evangelical Lutheran, Shalom Memorial Park and Wheeling.

=== Major highways ===
- U.S. Route 12
- U.S. Route 14
- U.S. Route 45
- Illinois Route 21
- Illinois Route 68
- Illinois Route 83
- Illinois Route 53
- Lake Cook Road
- Milwaukee Ave

=== Airports and landing strips ===
- Chicago Executive Airport

=== Lakes ===
- Potawatomi Lake

=== High schools ===
- John Hersey High School
- Prospect High School
- Buffalo Grove High School
- Wheeling High School

== Demographics ==
As of the 2020 census there were 157,487 people, 60,514 households, and 40,901 families residing in the township. The population density was 4,371.00 inhabitants per square mile (1,687.65/km^{2}). There were 64,965 housing units at an average density of 1,803.08 per square mile (696.17/km^{2}). The racial makeup of the township was 69.44% White, 1.57% African American, 0.66% Native American, 12.31% Asian, 0.02% Pacific Islander, 7.77% from other races, and 8.24% from two or more races. Hispanic or Latino of any race were 16.63% of the population.

There were 60,514 households, out of which 28.70% had children under the age of 18 living with them, 56.30% were married couples living together, 7.45% had a female householder with no spouse present, and 32.41% were non-families. 27.90% of all households were made up of individuals, and 13.20% had someone living alone who was 65 years of age or older. The average household size was 2.52 and the average family size was 3.10.

The township's age distribution consisted of 21.8% under the age of 18, 5.5% from 18 to 24, 26.4% from 25 to 44, 27.1% from 45 to 64, and 19.2% who were 65 years of age or older. The median age was 42.1 years. For every 100 females, there were 95.5 males. For every 100 females age 18 and over, there were 92.0 males.

The median income for a household in the township was $88,847, and the median income for a family was $111,443. Males had a median income of $60,411 versus $41,961 for females. The per capita income for the township was $45,691. About 3.7% of families and 5.8% of the population were below the poverty line, including 5.7% of those under age 18 and 8.6% of those age 65 or over.

Historical population
Census	Pop.	Note	%±
1930	8,088		—
1940	9,728		20.3%
1950	16,789		72.6%
1960	58,910		250.9%
1970	119,218		102.4%
1980	129,853		8.9%
1990	148,641		14.5%
2000	155,834		4.8%
2010	153,630		−1.4%
2020	157,487		2.5%
U.S. Decennial Census

== Politics ==
=== Political districts ===
- Illinois's 8th congressional district
- Illinois's 9th congressional district
- Illinois's 10th congressional district
- State House District 53
- State House District 57
- State House District 59
- State House District 66
- State Senate District 27
- State Senate District 29
- State Senate District 30
- State Senate District 33

=== Elected officials ===
- Maria Zeller Brauer (Democratic) - Supervisor
- Joanna Gauza (Republican) - Clerk
- Kenneth Jochum (Republican) - Assessor
- Austin Mejdrich (Democratic) - Trustee
- Lorri Grainawi (Democratic) - Trustee
- Sheri Williams (Democratic) - Trustee
- John Geier (Democratic) - Trustee
