= Schaumburg Township, Illinois =

Schaumburg Township
- Township
- Seal

- Location in Cook County

- Cook County's location in Illinois
- Coordinates: 42°01′41″N 88°05′19″W
- Country: United States
- State: Illinois
- County: Cook

Area
  - Total: 30.96 sq mi (80.2 km^{2})
  - Land: 30.74 sq mi (79.6 km^{2})
  - Water: 0.22 sq mi (0.57 km^{2}) 0.69%
- Elevation: 790 ft (240 m)

Population (2020)
  - Total: 134,809
  - Density: 4,385/sq mi (1,693/km^{2})
- Time zone: UTC-6 (CST)
  - Summer (DST): UTC-5 (CDT)
- ZIP codes: 60007, 60008, 60010, 60067, 60103, 60107, 60169, 60172, 60173, 60193, 60194, 60195
- FIPS code: 17-031-68016
- Website: www.schaumburgtownship.org

Schaumburg Township is one of 29 townships in Cook County, Illinois, USA. As of the 2020 census, its population was 134,809. It is in the north west corner of Cook County.

== Geography ==
According to the 2021 census gazetteer files, Schaumburg Township has a total area of 30.96 square miles (80.19 km^{2}), of which 30.74 square miles (79.62 km^{2}) (or 99.31%) is land and 0.22 square miles (0.57 km^{2}) (or 0.69%) is water.

=== Cities, towns, villages ===
- Elk Grove Village (small portion)
- Hanover Park (half)
- Hoffman Estates (half)
- Rolling Meadows (south edge)
- Roselle (upper third)
- Schaumburg (mostly)
- Streamwood

=== Adjacent townships ===
- Palatine Township (north)
- Elk Grove Township (east)
- Addison Township, DuPage County (southeast)
- Bloomingdale Township, DuPage County (south)
- Wayne Township, DuPage County (southwest)
- Hanover Township (west)
- Barrington Township (northwest)

=== Cemeteries ===
The township contains Greve Cemetery.

=== Major highways ===
- Interstate 90
- Interstate 290
- U.S. Route 20
- Illinois Route 19
- Illinois Route 53
- Illinois Route 58
- Illinois Route 72

=== Airports and landing strips ===
- Marriott Heliport
- Schaumburg Helistop
- Schaumburg Regional Airport

=== Lakes ===
- George Lake
- Merkle Lake
- Moon Lake
- Unity Lake
- Volkening Lake

=== Landmarks ===
- Wintrust Field
- Schaumburg Regional Airport
- Spring Valley Nature Center

== Demographics ==
As of the 2020 census there were 134,809 people, 48,588 households, and 33,895 families residing in the township. The population density was 4,355.00 inhabitants per square mile (1,681.47/km^{2}). There were 52,646 housing units at an average density of 1,700.73 per square mile (656.66/km^{2}). The racial makeup of the township was 56.38% White, 4.53% African American, 0.61% Native American, 23.57% Asian, 0.02% Pacific Islander, 6.53% from other races, and 8.37% from two or more races. Hispanic or Latino of any race were 14.88% of the population.

There were 48,588 households, out of which 32.60% had children under the age of 18 living with them, 55.75% were married couples living together, 10.25% had a female householder with no spouse present, and 30.24% were non-families. 25.10% of all households were made up of individuals, and 8.80% had someone living alone who was 65 years of age or older. The average household size was 2.65 and the average family size was 3.22.

The township's age distribution consisted of 23.0% under the age of 18, 6.7% from 18 to 24, 29.1% from 25 to 44, 26% from 45 to 64, and 15.2% who were 65 years of age or older. The median age was 38.6 years. For every 100 females, there were 93.2 males. For every 100 females age 18 and over, there were 92.7 males.

The median income for a household in the township was $83,909, and the median income for a family was $94,590. Males had a median income of $56,219 versus $41,337 for females. The per capita income for the township was $38,698. About 4.2% of families and 5.4% of the population were below the poverty line, including 6.7% of those under age 18 and 5.5% of those age 65 or over.

Historical population
Census	Pop.	Note	%±
1900	1,003		—
1910	954		−4.9%
1920	869		−8.9%
1930	804		−7.5%
1940	860		7.0%
1950	1,080		25.6%
1960	10,587		880.3%
1970	50,995		381.7%
1980	103,920		103.8%
1990	127,625		22.8%
2000	134,114		5.1%
2010	131,288		−2.1%
2020	134,809		2.7%
U.S. Decennial Census

== Political districts ==
- Illinois's 8th congressional district
- State House District 44
- State House District 56
- State House District 66
- State Senate District 22
- State Senate District 28
- State Senate District 33

== See also ==
- Schaumburg Township District Library
