= Hanover Township, Cook County, Illinois =

Hanover Township
- Township
- logo

- Location in Cook County

- Cook County's location in Illinois
- Coordinates: 42°01′40″N 88°12′14″W
- Country: United States
- State: Illinois
- County: Cook

Area
  - Total: 33.7 sq mi (87.2 km^{2})
  - Land: 33.4 sq mi (86.4 km^{2})
  - Water: 0.31 sq mi (0.8 km^{2}) 0.89%
- Elevation: 797 ft (243 m)

Population (2020)
  - Total: 100,092
  - Density: 3,000/sq mi (1,160/km^{2})
- Time zone: UTC-6 (CST)
  - Summer (DST): UTC-5 (CDT)
- ZIP codes: 60010, 60103, 60107, 60120, 60192, 60193, 60194, 60195
- FIPS code: 17-031-32694
- Website: www.hanover-township.org

Hanover Township is one of 29 townships in Cook County, Illinois, USA and is located at the end of the county's panhandle. As of the 2020 census, its population was 100,092 and it contained 35,007 housing units.

Hanover Township was established on April 2, 1850. The first reported population of the Township was 672. The Township gets its name from the "Kingdom of Hanover in Western Germany," which is where a majority of the Township's first residents originated from.

The primary governmental concerns were collecting taxes, control and collection of stray animals and maintenance of the roads. "Poor relief" was minimal in the early days of the Township and the Clerk was in control of organizing the machinery for elections, similar to the job they do today.

Today, Hanover Township has a population of over 105,000 residents. Most of Streamwood lies within the boundaries of the Township, along with portions of Bartlett, Elgin, Hanover Park, Hoffman Estates, Schaumburg and unincorporated Cook County.

Township offices include the Township Town Hall at 250 S. IL Route 59 in Bartlett, the Senior Center at 240 S. IL Route 59 in Bartlett, the Astor Avenue Community Center at 7431 Astor Avenue in Hanover Park, and the Izaak Walton Youth Center at 899 Jay Street in Elgin.

== Current elected officials ==
The current township officials are:

- Brian P. McGuire, Supervisor
- Katy Dolan Baumer, Clerk
- Khaja Moinuddin, Assessor
- Alisa "Lee" Beattie, Trustee
- Craig Essick, Trustee
- Denise Noyola, Trustee
- Eugene N. Martinez, Trustee

=== Heritage Marker Program ===
The Hanover Township Heritage Marker Program began in April 2011 to recognize and promote the many historic locations in Hanover Township. Currently there are five Heritage Markers around the Township, including: Ahlstrand Park in Hanover Park, Immanuel United Church of Christ Cemetery in Streamwood, Hoosier Grove Schoolhouse in Streamwood, Lords Park in Elgin and Leatherman Homestead in Bartlett.

== Geography ==
According to the United States Census Bureau, Hanover Township covers an area of 33.7 square miles (87.2 km^{2}); of this, 33.4 square miles (86.4 km^{2}) is land and 0.31 square miles (0.8 km^{2}), or 0.89 percent, is water.

=== Cities, towns, villages ===
- Bartlett (northern half)
- Elgin (small portion)
- Hanover Park (mostly)
- Hoffman Estates (mostly)
- Schaumburg (west edge)
- South Barrington (south edge)
- Streamwood

=== Unincorporated towns ===
- Spaulding at 42.005981°N 88.232803°W

=== Adjacent townships ===
- Barrington Township (north)
- Schaumburg Township (east)
- Bloomingdale Township, DuPage County (southeast)
- Wayne Township, DuPage County (south)
- St. Charles Township, Kane County (southwest)
- Elgin Township, Kane County (west)
- Dundee Township, Kane County (northwest)

=== Cemeteries ===
The township contains these four cemeteries: Bartlett, Bluff City, Lake Street Memorial Park and Mount Hope. Hoosier Grove cemetery behind Immanuel United Church of Christ on Old Church Road in Streamwood is closed for in-ground burials, but does have columbarium niches available through the church.

=== Major highways ===
- Interstate 90
- U.S. Route 20
- Illinois Route 19
- Illinois Route 25 (grazes the northwest corner)
- Illinois Route 58
- Illinois Route 59
- Illinois Route 72

=== Airports and landing strips ===
- Urso Heliport

=== Lakes ===
- Back Lake
- Front Lake
- Island Lake

== Demographics ==
As of the 2020 census there were 100,092 people, 32,680 households, and 24,162 families residing in the township. The population density was 2,977.60 inhabitants per square mile (1,149.66/km^{2}). There were 35,007 housing units at an average density of 1,041.41 per square mile (402.09/km^{2}). The racial makeup of the township was 44.33% White, 5.17% African American, 1.84% Native American, 15.54% Asian, 0.06% Pacific Islander, 18.58% from other races, and 14.48% from two or more races. Hispanic or Latino of any race were 37.16% of the population.

There were 32,680 households, out of which 37.90% had children under the age of 18 living with them, 58.12% were married couples living together, 10.48% had a female householder with no spouse present, and 26.06% were non-families. 21.90% of all households were made up of individuals, and 7.90% had someone living alone who was 65 years of age or older. The average household size was 3.03 and the average family size was 3.58.

The township's age distribution consisted of 25.0% under the age of 18, 7.9% from 18 to 24, 28.2% from 25 to 44, 25.7% from 45 to 64, and 13.2% who were 65 years of age or older. The median age was 37.3 years. For every 100 females, there were 100.4 males. For every 100 females age 18 and over, there were 101.8 males.

The median income for a household in the township was $84,988, and the median income for a family was $93,678. Males had a median income of $48,263 versus $34,256 for females. The per capita income for the township was $33,164. About 6.2% of families and 8.1% of the population were below the poverty line, including 11.0% of those under age 18 and 6.1% of those age 65 or over.

Historical population
Census	Pop.	Note	%±
1960	11,367		—
1970	34,150		200.4%
1980	47,717		39.7%
1990	62,308		30.6%
2000	83,471		34.0%
2010	99,538		19.2%
2020	100,092		0.6%

== Political districts ==
- Illinois's 6th congressional district
- State House District 43
- State House District 44
- State House District 55
- State Senate District 22
- State Senate District 28
- State Senate District 25
