= Elk Grove Township, Cook County, Illinois =

Elk Grove Township
- Township
- Flag Seal
- Motto: "Empowering People Through Community"
- Location in Cook County

- Cook County's location in Illinois
- Coordinates: 42°01′47″N 87°58′38″W
- Country: United States
- State: Illinois
- County: Cook

Area
  - Total: 27.98 sq mi (72.5 km^{2})
  - Land: 27.57 sq mi (71.4 km^{2})
  - Water: 0.41 sq mi (1.1 km^{2}) 1.48%
- Elevation: 705 ft (215 m)

Population (2020)
  - Total: 95,508
  - Density: 3,464/sq mi (1,338/km^{2})
- Time zone: UTC-6 (CST)
  - Summer (DST): UTC-5 (CDT)
- ZIP codes: 60005, 60007, 60008, 60016, 60018, 60056, 60067, 60173
- Area code(s): 847, 224
- FIPS code: 17-031-23243
- Website: www.elkgrovetownship.com

Elk Grove Township is one of 29 townships in Cook County, Illinois, USA. As of the 2020 census, its population was 95,508 and it contained 40,299 housing units. Elk Grove Township formerly housed the United Airlines headquarters.

== Geography ==
According to the 2021 census gazetteer files, Elk Grove Township has a total area of 27.98 square miles (72.47 km^{2}), of which 27.57 square miles (71.41 km^{2}) (or 98.52%) is land and 0.41 square miles (1.06 km^{2}) (or 1.48%) is water.

=== Cities, towns, villages ===
- Arlington Heights (south third)
- Des Plaines (west edge)
- Elk Grove Village (vast majority)
- Mount Prospect (southern portions)
- Rolling Meadows (lower third)
- Schaumburg (east edge)

=== Unincorporated Towns ===
- Schnells Corner at 42.028362°N 87.987289°W

=== Adjacent townships ===
- Wheeling Township (north)
- Maine Township (east)
- Addison Township, DuPage County (south)
- Bloomingdale Township, DuPage County (southwest)
- Schaumburg Township (west)
- Palatine Township (northwest)

=== Cemeteries ===
The township contains Elk Grove Cemetery.

=== Major highways ===
- Interstate 90
- Interstate 290
- U.S. Route 14
- Illinois Route 53
- Illinois Route 58
- Illinois Route 62
- Illinois Route 72
- Illinois Route 83

=== Lakes ===
- Busse Lake
- Fountain Lake
- Fred Hasse Lake

=== Landmarks ===
- Busse Woods Forest Preserve (vast majority)
- O'Hare International Airport
- United States Highway Army Reserve Center, Arlington Heights
- Elk Grove High School
- Rolling Meadows High School

== Demographics ==
As of the 2020 census there were 95,508 people, 35,760 households, and 23,896 families residing in the township. The population density was 3,413.56 inhabitants per square mile (1,317.98/km^{2}). There were 40,299 housing units at an average density of 1,440.33 per square mile (556.11/km^{2}). The racial makeup of the township was 62.09% White, 2.91% African American, 1.06% Native American, 13.10% Asian, 0.05% Pacific Islander, 11.10% from other races, and 9.68% from two or more races. Hispanic or Latino of any race were 22.42% of the population.

There were 35,760 households, out of which 32.00% had children under the age of 18 living with them, 52.35% were married couples living together, 9.36% had a female householder with no spouse present, and 33.18% were non-families. 28.30% of all households were made up of individuals, and 13.20% had someone living alone who was 65 years of age or older. The average household size was 2.56 and the average family size was 3.18.

The township's age distribution consisted of 23.1% under the age of 18, 6.5% from 18 to 24, 28.6% from 25 to 44, 25.5% from 45 to 64, and 16.2% who were 65 years of age or older. The median age was 39.2 years. For every 100 females, there were 97.8 males. For every 100 females age 18 and over, there were 95.0 males.

The median income for a household in the township was $71,778, and the median income for a family was $89,274. Males had a median income of $50,650 versus $38,631 for females. The per capita income for the township was $35,568. About 5.7% of families and 7.4% of the population were below the poverty line, including 9.0% of those under age 18 and 7.5% of those age 65 or over.

Historical population
| Census | Pop. | Note | %± |
|---|---|---|---|
| 2000 | 94,969 | | — |
| 2010 | 92,905 | | −2.2% |
| 2020 | 95,508 | | 2.8% |
U.S. Decennial Census

== School districts ==
- Chicago Public Schools
- Township High School District 214
- Community Consolidated School District 59

== Political districts ==
- Illinois's 6th congressional district
- State House District 48
- State House District 65
- State House District 66
- State Senate District 24
- State Senate District 33

== Economy ==
Elk Grove Township formerly had the corporate headquarters of United Airlines. In 2006 United Airlines announced that it would be moving its headquarters and its 350 top executives from Elk Grove Township to 77 West Wacker Drive in the Chicago Loop. After the City of Chicago gave additional financial incentives, United proceeded to schedule a move of its remaining employees out of the former Elk Grove Township headquarters into the Willis Tower (Sears Tower) in Chicago in the northern hemisphere of fall 2010. Monica Davey of The New York Times said that the move may have contributed to United's decision to base the new merged airline out of Chicago instead of Houston. The former headquarters is now a part of Mount Prospect, which annexed the land in the 2010s. In December 2021, it was reported that United would sell the campus to CloudHQ, which plans to build a data center. Many homes were razed in 2024 to make way for development.
