= 28th Illinois General Assembly =

1873 and 1874 legislative session

| ← | 27th | 29th | → |
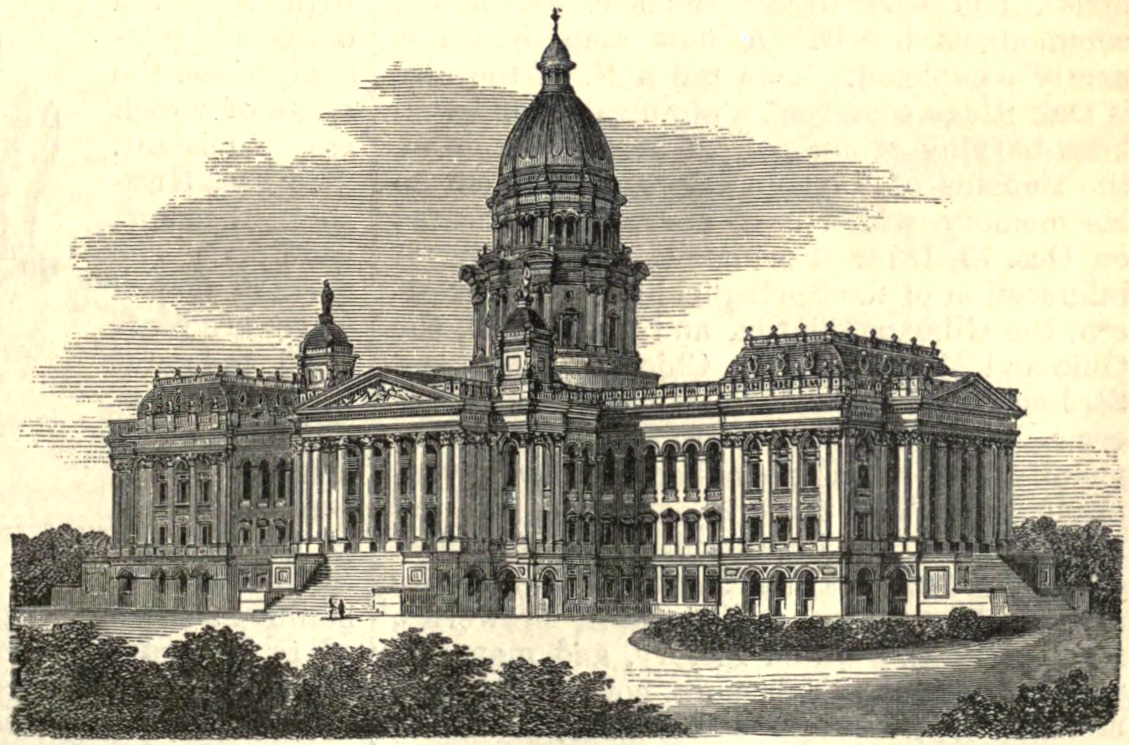
- The Illinois State Capitol in 1879

Overview
- Meeting place: Springfield, Illinois
- Term: 1873 – 1874
- Election: 1872

Illinois Senate
- President: John Lourie Beveridge, Republican (1873); John Early, Republican (1873–1874)

Illinois House of Representatives
- Speaker: Shelby Moore Cullom, Republican

The 28th Illinois General Assembly was elected in November 1872. The session began on January 8, 1873, and adjourned on March 31, 1874.

== Senate ==
The Illinois Senate as elected in 1872 contained 51 members, one from each state legislative district. This was the first legislative session following the Illinois Constitution of 1870, which established these districts and stated that Senators were to serve overlapping 4-year terms. George W. Burns resigned on September 20, 1873, and was replaced by Maurice Kelley.

Republican John Lourie Beveridge was elected president of the Senate, thereby also taking on the role of acting lieutenant governor. However, Governor Richard J. Oglesby was elected to the United States Senate, ascending on January 23. This made Beveridge the acting Governor of Illinois. John Early was named president, and thus lieutenant governor, in his place.

=== Members ===
1. Joseph S. Reynolds
2. Richard S. Thompson
3. Miles Kehoe
4. Samuel K. Dow
5. James J. McGrath
6. Horace F. Waite
7. Rollin S. Williamson
8. Clark W. Upton
9. John Early
10. Henry Green
11. Joseph M. Patterson
12. George P. Jacobs
13. Miles B. Castle
14. Eugene Canfield
15. William S. Brooks
16. Almon S. Palmer
17. Elmer Baldwin
18. James G. Strong
19. Lorenzo D. Whiting
20. Edward A. Wilcox
21. William H. Shephard
22. Patrick H. Sanford
23. Benjamin R. Hampton
24. Benjamin Warren
25. Samuel P. Cummings
26. John S. Lee
27. Aaron B. Nicholson
28. John Casey
29. Michael Donahue
30. Jairus C. Sheldon
31. John C. Short
32. Charles B. Steele
33. Charles Voris
34. William B. Huntley
35. Alexander Starne
36. Archibald A. Glenn
37. George W. Burns, Maurice Kelley
38. William R. Archer
39. William Brown
40. Beatty T. Burke
41. John H. Yeager
42. George Gundlach
43. John Cunningham
44. George W. Henry
45. William J. Crews
46. Thomas S. Casey
47. Francis M. Youngblood
48. William K. Murphy
49. John Hineheliffe
50. Jesse Ware
51. Charles M. Perrell

== House of Representatives ==
Under the Illinois Constitution of 1870, the state representatives were elected by cumulative voting, with each voter allocating their three votes to one, two or three of the candidates in the district. The Illinois House of Representatives as elected in 1872 thus contained 153 members, three from each of the state's 51 districts. Republican Shelby Moore Cullom was elected Speaker of the House. Robert J. Cross and Nehemiah Bushnell died before their terms were complete.

=== Members ===
1. James B. Bradwell
1. John A. Lomax
1. William Wayman
2. Solomon P. Hopkins
2. Frank T. Sherman
2. Charles G. Wicker
3. E. F. Cullterton
3. Constantine Kann
3. Thomas M. Halpin
4. John F. Scanlan
4. Thomas E. Ferrier
4. William H. Condon
5. William A. Herting
5. Ingwell Oleson
5. Hugh McLaughlin
6. Otto Peltzer
6. John M. Roundtree
6. George E. Washburn
7. Daniel Booth
7. Charles H. Dolton
7. Hanry C. Senne
8. Richard Bishop
8. Flavel K. Granger
8. Elisha Gridley
9. Robert J. Cross, Richard F. Crawford
9. Jesse S. Hildrup
9. Duncan J. Stewart
10. Edward L. Cronkrite
10. Alfred M. Jones
10. James S. Taggart
11. James Shaw
11. James E. McPherran
11. Dean S. Efner
12. Isaac Rice
12. Henry D. Dement
12. Frederick H. Marsh
13. Lyman B. Ray
13. George M. Hollenback
13. Perry A. Armstrong
14. Sylvester S. Mann
14. Julius A. Carpenter
14. James Herrington
15. Amos Savage
15. John S. Jessup
15. Jabez Harvey
16. Millard J. Sheridan
16. Erasmus B. Collins
16. Thomas S. Sawyer
17. Lewis Soule
17. Joseph Hart
17. George W. Armstrong
18. John P. Middlecoff
18. Lucian Bullard
18. John Pollock
19. Jacob R. Mulvane
19. Cyrus Bocock
19. Mark R. Dewey
20. Dwight J. Weber
20. Nathaniel Moore
20. John G. Freeman
21. Wilder W. Warner
21. Edward H. Johnson
21. Charles Dunham
22. Alson H. Streeter
22. George P. Graham
22. Jacob S. Chambers
23. William A. Grant
23. John E. Jackson
23. E. K. Westfall
24. William Scott
24. David Rankin
24. Edward E. Lane
25. Stephen Y. Thornton
25. John A. Gray
25. John M. Darnell
26. Julius S. Starr
26. Michael C. Quinn
26. Ezra G. Webster
27. Laban M. Stroud
27. Peter J. Hawes
27. Herman W. Snow
28. Archibald E. Stewart
28. Thomas P. Rogers
28. John Cassed
29. Joab A. Race
29. Tillman Lane
29. William T. Moffit
30. John Penfield
30. C. P. Davis
30. Francis E. Bryant
31. Willis O. Pinnell
31. Henri B. Bishop
31. Jacob H. Oakwood
32. William T. Sylvester, Joseph H. Ewing
32. John A. Freeland
32. James A. Connelly
33. W. H. McDonald
33. William H. Blakely
33. Benson Wood
34. James M. Truitt
34. Hiram P. Shumway
34. Elias J. C. Alexander
35. Alfred Orendorff
35. Milton Hay
35. Shelby Moore Cullom
36. Henry H. Moose
36. William W. Easley
36. Nathaniel W. Brandon
37. Charles Ballou
37. Nehemiah Bushnell, John Tillson, Albert J. Griffin
37. Ira M. Moore
38. Melville L. Massie
38. Stephen G. Lewis
38. Henry Dresser
39. Jerome B. Nulton
39. John W. Meacham
39. John Gordon
40. William McAdams
40. Jonathan Plowman
40. Archibald L. Virden
41. Henry Weinheimer
41. Benjamin R. Hite
41. Thomas T. Ramsey
42. Fred A. Lietze
42. Charles D. Hoiles
42. Andrew G. Henry
43. Napoleon B. Morrison
43. Charles G. Smith
43. Ziba S. Swan, Alfred P. Crosby
44. Isaac N. Jaquess
44. Robert T. Forth
44. David W. Barkley
45. John L. Flanders
45. Thomas J. Golden
45. Harmon Alexander
46. Leonidas Walker
46. Robert S. Anderson
46. Patrick Dolan
47. John G. Newton
47. James R. Loomis
47. Samuel M. Mitchell
48. John W. Platt
48. William Neville
48. Austin James
49. Bernard Wick, Spencer M. Kase
49. Luke H. Hite
49. John Thomas
50. William A. Lemma
50. Matthew J. Inscore
50. John H. Oberly
51. James L. Wymore
51. Francis M. McGee
51. Newton R. Casey

== See also ==
- 43rd United States Congress
- List of Illinois state legislatures
