= Piasa =

Legendary Native American creature

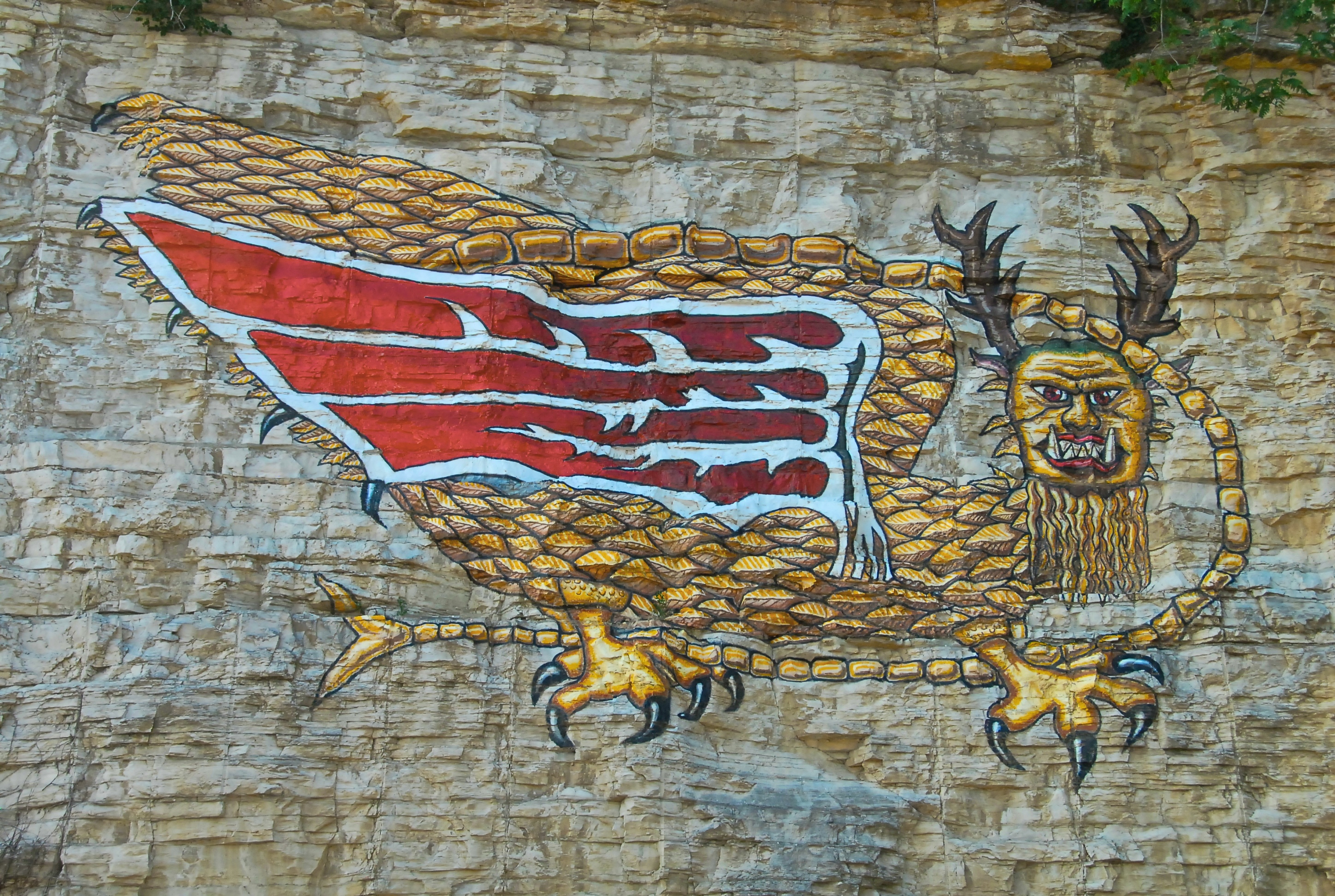
Modern reproduction of the "Piasa Bird" completed 1998 or 1999 on the bluffs of the Mississippi River in Alton.

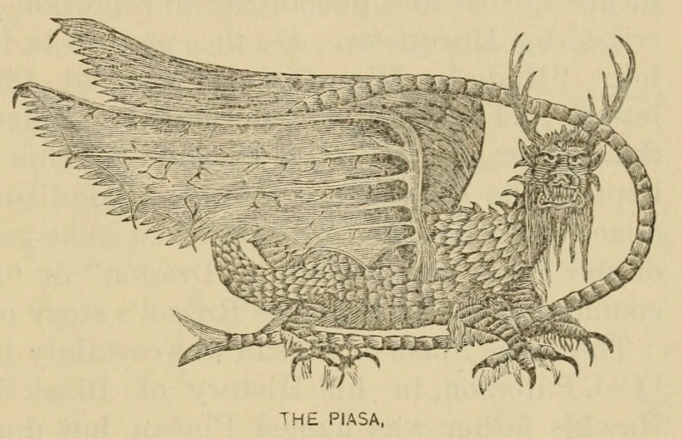
Piasa. Questioned drawing purported to have been made by William Dennis, 3 April 1825, published in the § 1887 McAdams book. (Note: Later a gift of Wm. McAdams of Alton to the Smithsonian Institution.)

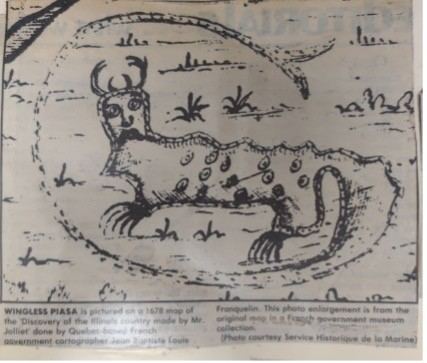
Petrograph monster at Alton. Jean-Baptiste-Louis Franquelin's 1678 map. —Copy held by Service historique de la marine, Vincennes. Published by Jerome Jacobson (1991)

The Piasa (/ˈpaɪ.əsɔː/ PY-ə-saw (Note: "pronounced PIE-a-saw",)) or Piasa Bird (aka Paillissa, Piesa) is a later name applied to the creature or creatures depicted from Native American mythology, and depicted in a mural painted by Native Americans high on cliffsides above the Mississippi River near Alton, Illinois. The origin of the word piasa is uncertain, but originally described the cliffs rather than the creature or mural.

The oldest known written reference to the mural dates to 1673 from French explorers, and the oldest known sketches date to 1678 and 1682 also from French sources. These sketches show a four-legged creature with a spotted or scaled semi-feline body, an antlered head, and a long tail. This mural is now believed to have depicted a legendary creature known as the underwater panther. By the mid-1800s it was common to depicts the creature with wings, but wings were not an original feature on the mural and appeared in later retelling and interpretation.

A second mural site depicting creatures similar to mermen was also rumored, but its existence is much less certain.

The wall where the original paintings existed at Alton was probably destroyed circa 1850s. The mural has been subsequently been restored with replicas a number of times.

== Overview ==
The original petrographs were described by French explorers Jacques Marquette and Louis Jolliet (1673) and described as a multicolored human-faced creature with a long tail terminating in fish-like fin. They made a sketch, a copy of which is preserved in maps created by cartographer Jean-Baptiste-Louis Franquelin (1678, 1681), and 19th century copies thereof. This creature is identifiable as the underwater panther of native lore. The beast's body features a number of concentric rings, purported to be scales (cf. § Scale iconography)

Subsequent French explorers and missionaries learned of a second mural location painted with tritons (man-fish or mermen), but claimed not to be able to find either, or that there were only red-colored horse pictures on lower walls, or already effaced or gone by 1698.

The monster paintings recorded by the Jesuit Marquette (1673) were the "object of Indian worship" that alarmed even Marquette himself on the ongoing idolatry, according to the interpretation of some commentators. The rival Recollects order which explored the area afterwards described the natives offering tobacco to the paintings in order to appease the Manitou great spirits at the Cape St. Anthony site where the Miami and the Matsigamea (Mitchigamea) clashed. (Note: Hennepin: "Miami's were drown'd in that Place.. and since that time, the Savages use to smoak, and offer Tobacco to those Beasts, to appease, as they say, the Manitou" and Douay: "the Miamis, pursued by the Matsigamea, having been drowned in the river, the Indians ever since that time present tobacco to these grotesque figures [marmousets] whenever they pass, in order to appease the manitou", requoted by Hodge.) (Note: Henri Joutel (1687) also recorded that "our Indians paid Homage, by offering Sacrifice to that Stone" and indicated by hand signs that they could forfeit their lives if derelict in venerating the pictures. Buisson de Saint-Cosme (1699) recorded the natives as venerating the stones as well.)

The sheer high cliffs in question were called the "Piasas" by the 18th century, attested in American maps. The painted monsters themselves were being called piesa by 1812, and were claimed to be still visible. At least one petrograph allegedly remained, described as the "piasa bird" and made famous by writer John Russell (1836, 1848). There were also pictorial winged depictions of the piasa, one by painter Henry Lewis (sketched c. 1846, published 1857) but the sketch published in § 1887 McAdams book purportedly executed 1825. This image became the more famous (Note: Although there are numerous copies or closely similar alternate sketches, e.g. by Spencer G. Russell)

Wayne C. Temple (1956) wrote the most comprehensive account on the creature (Note: Accord Vogel (1959).) He did not believe any trace of the painting still remained to be seen in the 19th century, disputing the string of claimed witnesses. Thus he dismissed Lewis's winged painting (as too dragon like (Note: While Goddard (1982) is certain Lewis did not travel until 1848 when the wall-face was destroyed by quarrying, and concludes that Lewis must have reconstructed an image out of written accounts.)), and the famous piasa sketch (as McAdams's own reconstructed drawing based on Marquette's writing, as his daughter claimed).

Commentators conjecture the wings may have been an added foreign added element, inspired by European art (Note: Goddard. Probably Temple also, but he only succinctly characterizes the Lewis painting as "dragon".) while others note a peculiar resemblance in style to the Chinese dragon (Note: Grafton Elliot Smith and cf. the physician Harland William Long musing on the natives knowing "Mongolian archaeology".) (Note: Although the Chinese long dragon are typically wingless (though often horned), but there are subtypes e.g. yinglong that had wings.)).

Temple also concluded that the tale about the warrior chief Ouatoga who exposed himself to the danger of the bird to save the tribe, was a piece of Russell's fiction and not genuine folklore. Though other versions (featuring different names and settings) signed by other authors appeared in the period, Temple explained these away as either fabricated by other fiction writers, or that mangled and embellished versions collected from local residents retelling what quickly became old yarn. While some researchers concur, (Note: John E. Hallwas (1982) and probably Goddard (1982); also Dr. Mark Wagner in TV clip (2015)) others allow for the possibility that genuine native folkloric material had been transmitted. (Note: Vogel (1959), Brewster (1949))

There is a separate legend, which § 1887 Armstrong book published, relating how the monster bird interceded against the Miami in favor of the Mitchigamea (of the Illini confederacy), in the historical tribal war (which were told by the natives to § 1687 Douay and 1697 Hennepin).

The face of the wall which held the mural was quarried away in 1846 or 1847 according to McAdams, but various other dates have been offered (c. 1856, 1867 1870s.) Either way, instead of the original Piasa now either destroyed or worn away, a newer 20th-century replica was installed on the Piasa bluff at Alton, Illinois, based on the famous drawing, several hundred yards upstream from its origin. The limestone rock quality is unsuited for holding an image, and the painting must be regularly restored. The original face of the bluff where the painting occurred was quarried away around 1846 or 1847. (Note: According to McAdams (1887), p. 9)

== Nomenclature ==
The petrographs of two monstrous creatures in question were described in the 17th century by the French missionary and explorer Jacques Marquette and Louis Jolliet. Some tacitly assume the term "piasa" was the term used by the natives to refer to the creatures, but the term is unattested in Marquette's journal (cf. § Discovery of the murals). Early usage of Piasa as a geological or geographical label occurs, e.g., on Hutchins's map (1789) where it is labeled "Piasas" ((without any explanation) on the bend of the Mississippi just before the confluence with the Missouri. (Note: "the Piasas" is mentioned in Patrick Kennedy's journal entry, 23 July 1773, published as appendix to Hutchins's 1778 map. The passage reads "The chain of rocks and high hills which begin at the Piasas about three miles above the Missouri...")

Later, "Piesa" is attested as a word actually used to refer to the "Painted Monsters", in Stoddard (1812). But before John Russell (1836, 1848) used the term "piasa" ("piasa bird") and popularized it, the rock painting monster at or near Alton, was more commonly referred to as "dragon" or "flying dragon", according to McAdams.

Linguist Ives Goddard did not think the term was attested in the Algonquian languages, and that piasa could only derived from native terms via implausible "distortions" (hence § French placename etymology Nevertheless, one or another native etymology (cf. § Thunderbird etymology, § Tiger, panther, or dragon etymology, etc.) has been suggested, gaining acceptance by more recent commentators (cf. § Little people etymology) as explained below. The etymology theories are intertwined with the identification of creature, which will be discussed first.

=== Identification of creatures ===
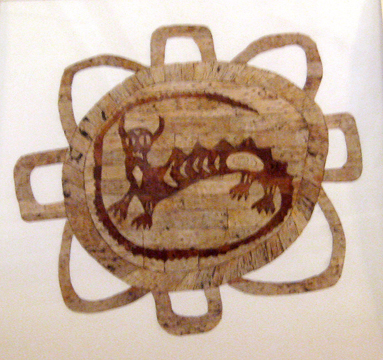
Underwater Panther, George Gustav Heye Center, National Museum of the American Indian

The identity of the piasa creature was identified early on by J. P. Dunn (1917, etc.), as Lĕn'-nĭ-pĭn'-ja or "Man-cat" of the Miami, Illinois, and Peoria people, known as Mĭ-cĭ-bĭ-sĭ ("Big Cat" or "Panther", var. mishibizhii, mishipeshu) to the more northerly Ojibwe tribe; these are all names for what is also called the underwater panther. Esarey, Costa, Wood, et al. (2015) also endorse the underwater panther identification, stressing how wings were never mentioned in the § 1673 Marquette party journals. This group endorses the payiihsa (i.e., § Little people etymology and believe that the original associated folktale involved an aquatic pair of evil twin dwarfs (plural: payiihsaki) who have overtaken a certain den and has left their footprints, the den which the hero Wissakatchakwa had conquered from a water manitou who had abducted him there (Note: Alongside other hostages, supposedly including Frenchmen, who had been terrified when they approached the manitou's lair. The hero uses gunpowder to explode the manitou.) Russell mangled the native tale along this line into his own short story about a piasa bird. The Underwater Panther origin is also supported by research conducted by Dr. Mark J. Wagner, Director, Center for Archaeological Investigations and Professor, Department of Anthropology, Southern Illinois University at Carbondale.

Still, there had been others in the past who were more conducive to the identification of the piasa with some sort of monster bird myth, e.g., Perry A. Armstrong (1887), who demonstrated that certain mythical birds (white, giant bird of myth, "devil bird" in the narrative summrized below) were associated with the rock pictographs in local native lore. Writer Clara Kern Bayliss (1908, 1909) later made connection to the widespread thunderbird across many Amerindian tribes. (Note: Bayliss appears confident that it was a "piasa bird" that was witnessed even by the French missionaries of the 17th century, insofar as she is quoted as saying: "Marquette, Hennepin, St. Cosme, Douay, and Joutel mention two birds and rock pictures" (1909: 116).)

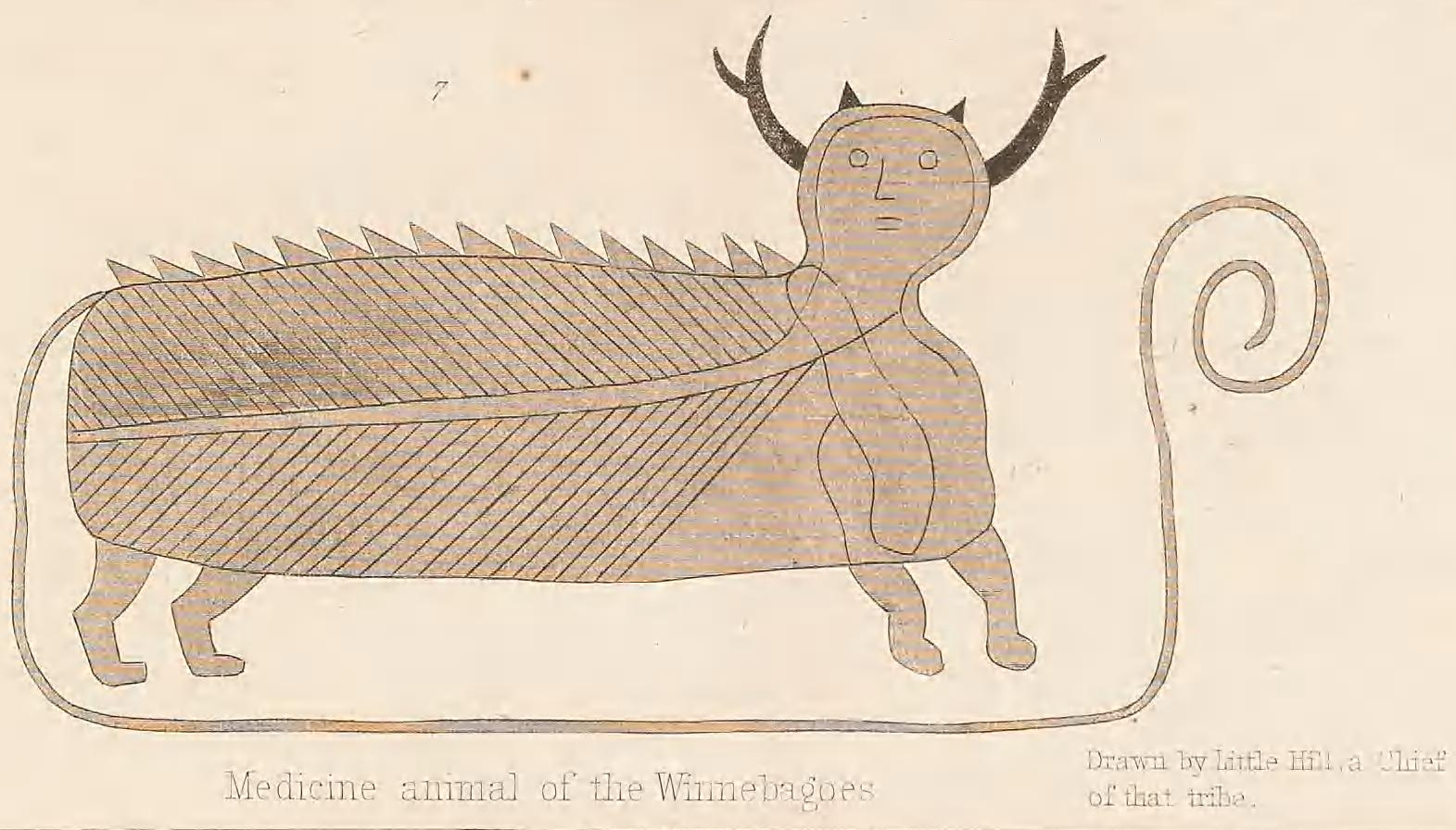
Medicine animal of the Winnebagoes. —Drawn by Chief Little Hill, Winnebago tribe

Commentators also hazarded a guess that Marquette/Joliette's beast probably resembled the "Medicine animal of the Winnebagoes" (cf. image right) which had been published by Henry Schoolcraft (1851, 1852).

=== Thunderbird etymology ===
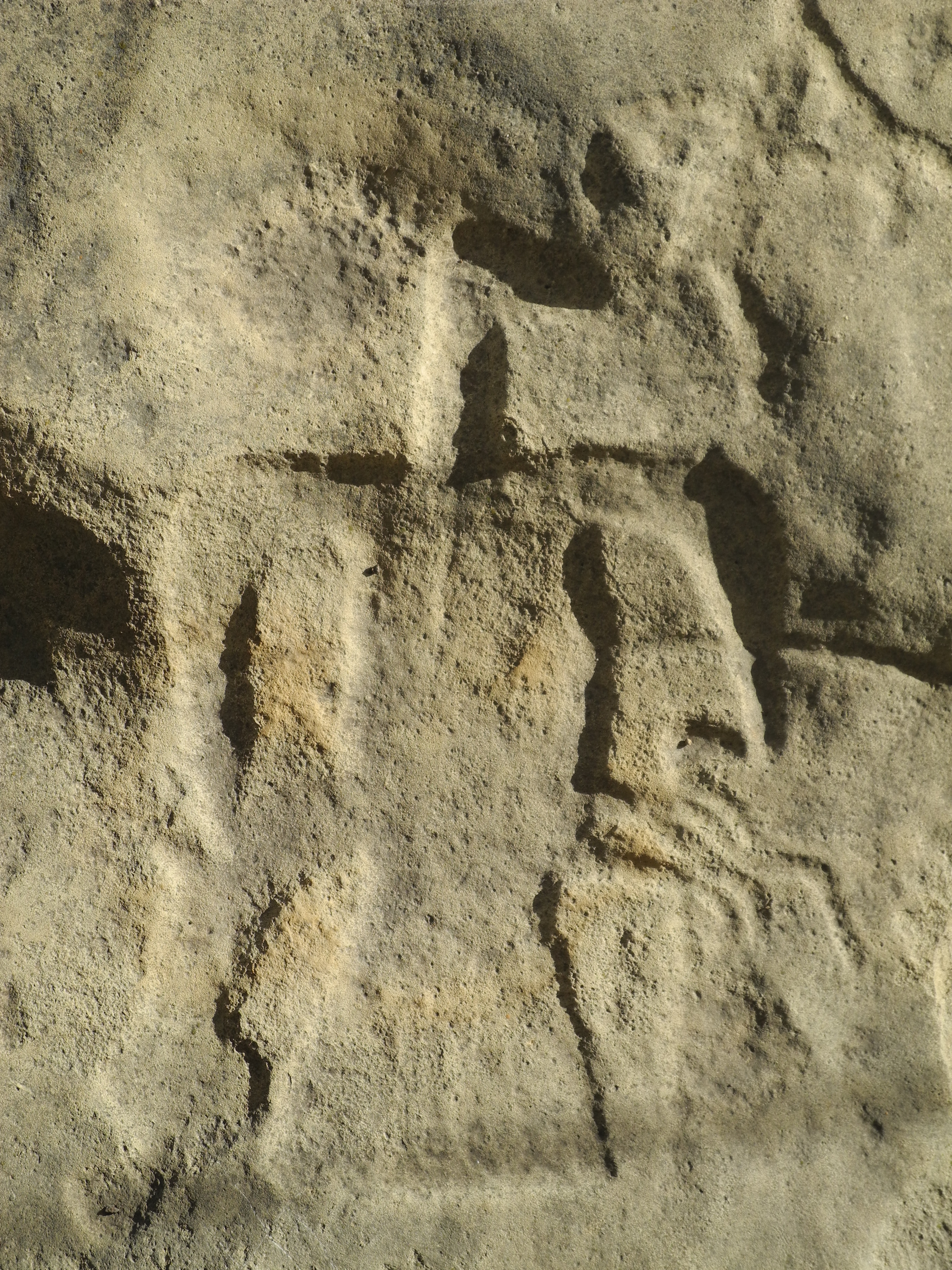
A "Sacred Eagle" petroglyph —Washington State Park in Missouri

The linguist J. N. B. Hewitt (before 1910) has pointed out Piasa could be explained as a cognate of Cree piyesiw for 'thunderbird', probably also cognate with Ojibwe binĕssi 'large bird'. (Note: Hodge (1910) II: 241, also cited by Vogel (1962) at p. 392, n712.)

The above is not inconsistent with the assertion by Russell that Piasa means "bird that devours men" in the native Illinois language (Illiniwek). (Note: Russell. reworded as "man-devouring bird" by Bayliss and others.) (Note: Given (as correct gloss) in Berland 2016 (ABC-CLIO encyclopedia).)

=== Little people etymology ===
However, piasa was not in the vocabulary of the Illini according to Jacob Piatt Dunn (1917, 1919, etc.), possibly overstating his case. (Note: Though Dunn was an authority on the language, he overstated when he asserted no such word existed in the language, for there are names such as Paessa, a Kaskaskia chieftain who fell fighting the Iroquois in 1680–81, and there was also Pyesa, father of the Sauk hero Black Hawk.)

According to Dunn, piasa actually referred to Pa-i'-sa (pl. Pa-i'-sa-ki) denoting a race of Little People, and the cliffs where the pictographs occur are actually called Pa-i'sa Rock by the Illinois people. This etymology of Piasa derived from páyiihsa (=Pa-i'-sa) 'little people'/'small supernatural' being is reiterated by, e.g., David J. Costa (2005).

Dunn did not arrive at the knowledge or conviction that the native considered the Pa-i'sa dwarfs to be the artists who crafted the pictographs, and only floated this as a hypothetical possibility. However, there is tradition among other Algonquian-language family tribes (specifically Mi'kmaq) that the little people were carvers of petroglyphs.

Since the "Payiihsa" (Pa-i'-sa) is a " being" or "little people" usually said to live in water, Costa goes as far as to say that the Piasa depicted in the rock art (underwater panther) and the Piasa (páyiihsaki=Pa-i'-sa-ki} denoting the "little people" do at least have the habit of attacking river travelers in common. (Note: Though in the collected folktales, tales about the payiihsa and those about the underwater panther or Lĕnnĭpĭnja (lénipinšia) remain clearly distinguished.)

Indeed, the "Payiihsa" (which often bear large feet with 4 or 6 toes) are referenced frequently in pottery and rock art symbolism along with the symbolism of the underwater panther.

=== Tiger, panther, or dragon etymology ===
The Illini term for the "underwater panther" Lĕnnĭpĭnja var. Lenapízha can be broken down to mean literally "true tiger" yielding pizha or pissa meaning "tiger" or "panther". (Note: Note that the early Spaniards in the New World referred to the jaguar and sometimes the puma as "tiger". Similar usage is seen in French and English languages. "American panther" usually refers to the cougar or puma.) This pizha "tiger" has been proposed as the etymology of piasa by archaeologist Jerome Jacobson.

But linguist Albert S. Gatschet (1899) further described Lenapízha as "an awe-inspiring animal of the dragon species, and of enormous dimensions", and "a phantom representing the lightning striking a lake or river, and [such water-lightning] stroke causes it to appear as a fire-dragon". Hewitt also perceived the piasa as "fire dragon" (aka "meteor").

=== French placename etymology ===
The cliffs above where pictographs of the creature[s] (later to be called 'piasa') was reported in the 17th century (§ Discovery of the murals), was given the French name Hauteurs De Paillisa, meaning 'perpendicular/lofty palisades' and thus marked on the 1797–8 map of French explorer Nicolas De Finiels. This has led to the alternative theory that the monster may derive from corruption of this French word paillisa (pronounced "pi-yiisa") for 'palisade'.

Note however this French map is later than the aforementioned Hutchin's map of 1778 which clearly shows the place name "PIASAS" where the present day City of Alton is located and bounded by the Wood River to the east.

=== Modern iconographic terminology ===
To complicate matters, the scholars cataloguing the iconography of these creatures began in 1970s (Note: Citing Perino (1971) and Phillips & Brown (1978).) to apply the term "Piasa" to any symbolism matching the "protean super theme" of underwater panthers (including flying underwater panthers, human impersonators of underwater panthers, and quadrupeds) and underwater serpents, etc. This sort of appropriation of the term "Piasa" was only possible because as far as the iconographers were concerned, no genuine image of the "Piasa [bird]" has actually survived. (Note: "In doing this, Phillips and Brown in 1978 was particularly comforted by the fact there was no authentic image of the creature known as piasa at Alton".)

== History ==
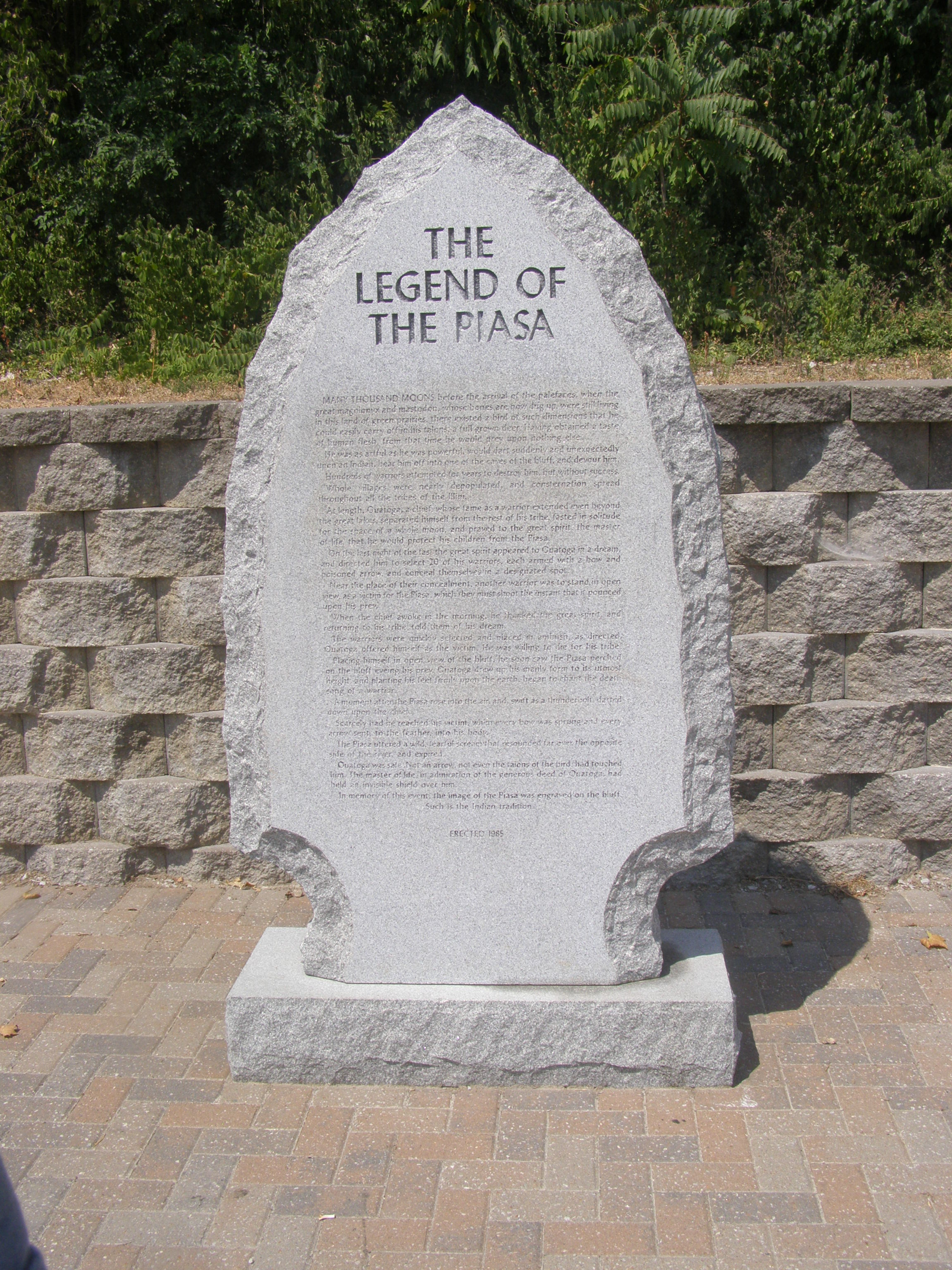
Piasa Bird Historic Site marker. Alton, Illinois

The original mural location of the image was at a river-bluff terminus of the American Bottom floodplain. This rock art was the largest Native American painting ever found in North America.

It may have been created prior to the arrival of any European explorers in the region, an older iconograph from the large Mississippian culture city of Cahokia, which began developing about 900 CE. Cahokia was at its peak about 1200 CE, with 20,000 to 30,000 residents. It was the largest prehistoric city north of Mexico and a major chiefdom. Icons and animal pictographs such as falcons, thunderbirds, bird men, and monstrous snakes were common motifs of the Cahokia culture.

=== 1673 Marquette party journals ===
(Discovery of the murals)

In 1673, Father Jacques Marquette saw the painting on a limestone bluff overlooking the Mississippi River while exploring the area while in contact with the local Menominee. He recorded the following description:

Comme nous Cottoions des roches affreux pour Leur haulteur et pour leur Longour; Nous vismes sur un de ces roches deux monstres en peinture qui Nous firent peur d'abord et sur Lesquels les sauuages les plus hardys n'osent pas arrester Longtemps les yeux; ils sont gros Comme vn veau. ils ont des Cornes en teste Comme des cheureils; un regard affreux, des yeux rouges, une barbe Comme d'un tygre, la face a quelque chose de l'homme, le corps Couuert d'écailles, et La queuë si Longue qu'elle fait tout le tour du Corps passant par dessus la teste et retournant entre les jambes elle se termine en queuë de Poisson. Le vert, Le rouge et Le noirastre sont les trois Couleurs qui Le Composent: au reste ces 2 monstres sont si bien peint que nous ne pouuons pas croire qu'aucun sauuage en soit L'autheur, puisque Les bons peintres en france auroient peine a si bien faire, veuque d'ailleurs ils sont si hauts sur le rocher qu'il est difficile d'y atteindre Commodément pour les peindre. voicy a peu pres La figure de ces monstres Comme nous L'auons Contretirée.

— Marquette, Jacques (1673), journal Actually Claude Dablon's account, presented as if written by Marquette)
Translation:

While skirting some rocks, which by their height and length inspired awe, we saw upon one of them two painted monsters which at first made us afraid, and upon which the boldest savages dare not long rest their eyes. they are as large as a calf; they have horns on their heads like those of a deer, a horrible look, red eyes, a beard like a tiger's, a face somewhat like a man's, a body covered with scales, and so long a tail that it winds all around the body, passing above the head and going back between the legs, ending in a fish's tail. green, red, and black are the three colors composing the picture. Moreover, these two monsters are so well painted that we cannot believe that any savage is their author; for good painters in France would find it difficult to reach that place conveniently to paint them. Here is approximately the shape of these monsters, as we have faithfully copied it

— Marquette, Jacques (1673)'s journal

The substance of the Marquette journal is paraphrased thus: "It was an object of Indian worship and greatly impressed the mind of the pious missionary with the necessity of substituting for this monstrous idolatry the worship of the true God". (Note: Davidson & Stuve, requoted in Smith (1920), p. 334) Marquette does not appear to say this in so many words, but the other missionaries/explorers do note that the natives offered tobacco smoke to these pictorial monsters in order to appease the manitou (cf. § As cult idols), and Marquette does refer to the worship of the Manitou, and states it takes the form of "a serpent, a bird, or other similar thing" visiting the natives in their dreams.

One point that modern commentators stress is that Marquette's description never mentioned any "wings" (cf. § Underwater panther identification), and 19th century accounts of winged Piasa (cf. § 1836 John Russell account) and picture (cf. § 1887 McAdams book with drawing ascribed to 1825). (Note: L's account (1844) "seems to be more in keeping with Marquette’s description [than Russell's] since there is no mention of wings.)

Marquette's party (actually Jolliet) drew a copy of the rock art (as indicated in the first version journal entry above), but it has not survived. However, Francis Parkman owned a copy of the map made few years later for Jacques Duchesneau, intendant of New France and on it he realized there was sketch of a monster which was a probable copy of Marquette's drawing. (Note: Parkman, quoted by Voelker (1914), p. 83)

=== 1678 Franquelin map ===
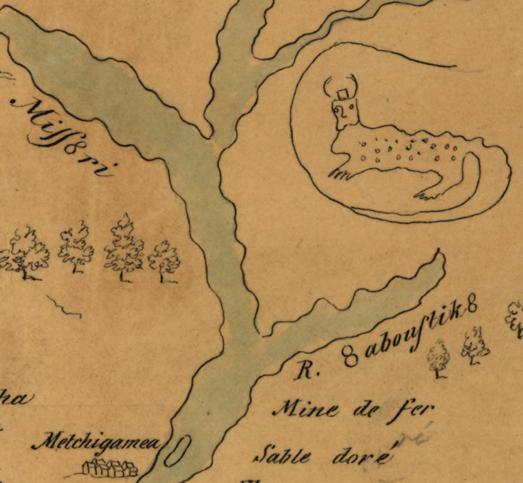
Piasa (drawn beneath Illinois River), detail, in Kohl, J. G. (Johann Georg) (ca. 1850) The Mississippi map, copy of a 1681/1682 original. —via Library of Congress

Parker's map was a copy c. 1855 of Carte genlle [génerale] de la France septentrionale, contenant dans la découverte du pays des Illinois Faite par le Sieur Jolliet ("General Map of Northern France, Containing the Discovery of the Illinois Country Made by Sieur Jolliet") as appears in the first cartouche; presented to the royal counsel Jean-Baptiste Colbert by Duchesneau (as appears in the second cartouche), and attributed to French cartographer Jean-Baptiste-Louis Franquelin; datable to 1681. (Note: As catalogued by Dionne's map inventory. Slight difference in spelling: Carte gnlle.. des Ilinois [sic]..)

There is also Kohl's reproduced map c. 1850, catalogued at the Library of Congress (cf. image right). Marginal writings in English confirm this was a copy of Carte Génerale, which Kohl found in Paris but was unable to date, though he knew Franquelin had published a map like it in 1688. (Note: 1688 map is confirmable in Dionne's catalogue) The shelfmark of this map is "G4042.M5 1682 .F7", and the LOC, in an earlier version of the webpage showcasing this item, had given the date ca. 1682 to this map. (Note: The current (August 2026) Mythic Mississippi Project page gives this 1682 date to the monster image on this Kohl map.)

Jerome Jacobson located an original map by Franquelin dated 1678, (Note: That one was published by the hydrographe at such a date is confirmable in Dionne's catalogue) and published from it the drawing of the beast at the Alton location (cf. 3rd image from top). (Note: Published by Jacobson (1991) from a photocopy requested from French naval archives (Service historique de la marine, Vincennes, which held the original.) This is presumably a copy of one of Jolliet's original sketches (while the journal suggests both beasts were sketched). (Note: Though the possibility it is just reconstructed from Marquette's accounts is not completely ruled out, as Jacobson (1991) points out.)

==== Scale iconography ====
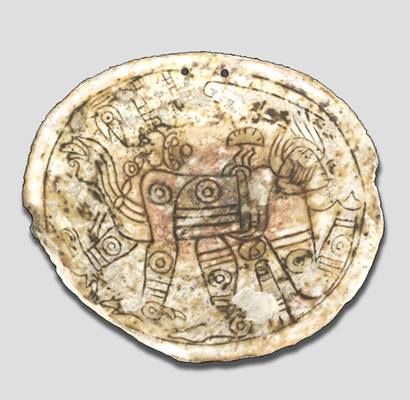
Shell gorget of "human-feline-avian figure" classed as "piasa" artefact —Hemphill style. Excavated at Moundville by Clarence B. Moore, 1906. Collection of National Museum of the American Indian, catalog # 17/1042

It has been noted by Esarey et al. that the so-called "scale" on the original Piasa beast, drawn in the form of concentric circles, matches the style of markings found on a panther-man (Note: This phrase in not used per se, but Steponaitis et al.'s Fig. 11 is captioned "Comparison of panther and human-like imagery", and the phrase derives from this. In the main text commenting on Fig. 11, the exact wording used is "human-feline-avian figure".) depicted on a shell gorget unearthed in Moundsville site in Alabama (cf. image right). So while these circle appear to represent "spots" on a feline, the Esarey et al. maintain these are the scales, further noting that the concentric circles appear near alleged footprints of the Pa-i'sa (Little People) in rock painted artefacts. (Note: Esarey et al. also comment on the so-called "turkey tracks" found often with the Pa-i'sa footprints, and also used in the shell gorget (overlapping the beast-man's eye, highlighted in red). Another source comments that the "trilobates" are associated with snakes, according to Phillips and Brown (1978), Pre-Columbian Shell Engravings from the Craig Mound at Spiro, Oklahoma, p. 156.)

=== 1687 Douay and 1697 Hennepin ===
(Tritons or horse and beasts at the second painting site)

Robert de La Salle in 1680 reported he saw Jolliet's sketch of the monster, but furnishes no detail beyond calling it "grotesque". He also received a tip that there was another painting site further down stream (presumably at Cape St. Anthony); La Salle did not mount on a trip down the river until 1682, and nothing on the paintings are reported by him.

Father Anastasius Douay in 1687 commented on La Salle's voyage, and meanwhile derided Marquette's book account as "pretended discovery (cette decouverte pretenduë)" and having "not a word of truth in it (qu'il n'y avoit pas un mot de veritable)". It is noted that Douay being of the order of Recollects would have regarded Marquette as a bitter rival. (Note: In Douay's passage here "a heavy charge is brought against the narratives of Father Marquette" without explicitly invoking his name.) while he held only respect for Jolliet. (Note: "I would not be inclined to think that the sieur Joliet avowed the printed account of that discovery which is not, in fact, under his name".Shea (1903), p. 227)) Contradicting Marquette, Douay found the murals to be not at an inaccessible height but touchable, and the pictures were not of fantastic beasts, but horses and other wild beasts. (Note: Published 1691 by Chrestien Le Clercq. Quoted in English translation in Shea, John Gilmary, ed. (1852) Discovery and Exploration of the Mississippi Valley, 2: 273–274 (reprint 2025) ≈ .Shea (1903), p. 227 Requoted in Temple (1956), p. 6)

However, if Douay was perhaps describing the second painting site, since according to Temple, Douay's account was rehashed and paraphrased by Father Louis Hennepin (1697) thus:

...pendant que je voyageois sur le fleuve Meschasipi, de rapporter, ce que les Illinois nous avoient souvent dit,..près vers l'endroit, appellé dans la Carte le Cap de S. Antoine, assez près de la Nation des Messorites, on y voit des Tritons & des Monstres marins dépeints, que les hommes les plus hardis n'osent regarder, parce qu'il ya de l'enchantement, & quelque chose de surnaturel. Ces prétendus monstres affreux ne sont dans le fonds qu'un cheval assez mal peint avec du Matachia de couleur rouge, & quelques bêtes fauves griffonnées par les Sauvages,..

— Hennepin, Louis (1711) Voyages curieux et nouveaux de messieurs Hennepin et de la Borde
Translation:

...[during my voyage on the Mississippi river] the Illinois had told us, that towards the Cape, which I have call'd in my Map St. Anthony near the Nation of the Messorites [i.e., Missouria], there were some Tritons, and other Sea-Monsters painted, which the boldest Men durst not look upon, there being some Enchantment in their Faces... but when we came near the Place they had mention'd, we saw instead of these Monsters, a Horse and some other Beasts painted upon the Rock with red Colours by the Savages.

— Hennepin, Louis, edited by Thwaite (1903), repr. from London issue of 1698.

Hennepin concurs with Douay in using the word matachia (old word for paint (Note: The term matachia is not of Native origin, but thought to derive from Basque patatxa meaning 'a coin'; the term came to be applied to various trade goods such as beads and embroidery which are usually colored, and transitioned to the meaning of "color".)), but also suggests the paintings he saw at the second site were of monochrome red, not multi-colored as what Marquette had seen. Hennepin also places these horse painting at a lower elevation, whereas his Indian informants said their paintings were at a steep height. Henri Joutel on 2 September 1687 claimed to have seen the pictographs, "two scurvy Figures drawn in red ("deux méchantes figures crayonnées en rouge)", which he characterized as Marquette's pretended monsters, though this was a day after they already navigated past the Missourri river. (Note: Joutel, requoted in) again suggesting a monochrome painting.

Both Douay and Hennepin add that according to native lore, a tribal war occurred at this pictograph location in which many Miami warriors were drowned in the pursuit by the Matsigamea (Mitchigamea), and that the natives since then use smoke or make offerings of tobacco to the pictorial beasts, to appease the Manitou. A more elaborate folktale on this was later published in the 19th century (cf. § 1887 Armstrong book).

=== 1698 Buisson de Saint-Cosme ===
Saint-Cosme's voyage route along the Mississippi River. Southern Illinois.
The indicates mouths of rivers. The explorer passed the mouth of Illinois River, mouth of the Piasa Creek, the town of Alton, then mouth of the Missouri in that order. The location of the original Cape St. Anthony is uncertain, but more southerly and near Grays Point compared with the modern Cape St. Anthony at Grand Tower.

(fading and disappeared murals)

When the French explorer Jean-François Buisson de Saint-Cosme journeyed to verified the rock murals at the two sites in 1698, (Note: Dated 1698 by Temple. Although Shea's Chapter II dates to 1699 collating the voyages of several persons, Saint-Cosme's letter carries over from December to January.) On 6 December, 1698, he mounted on a trip on the Mississippi, and he came to a spot, three or four leagues below (the Illinois), past the confluence with the Missouri River, with painted figures on the rock, venerated by the natives, which were "almost effaced". He reached the Tamaroa mission (Cahokia, Illinois) the next day. Presumably he was referring to what later came to be called the "Piasa", first described by Marquette.

Saint-Cosme on 12 December 1698 arrived at Cape St. Anthony, the second mural site, anticipating to see more murals there, but his party "saw no figure as [they] had been told".

William McAdams (1887) conjectured that already by the time Saint-Cosme came to it, there had been considerable damaged done by the natives "discharging their weapons" (rather than natural weathering). As Russell (1836) stated: "even at this day, an Indian never passes that spot in his canoe without firing his gun at the figure of the bird", intimating that this firearm salute was occurring already in times of yore. (Note: Author A. D. Jones, in his book Illinois and the West c. 1838, also describes the ravages of weapons (firearms) upon the images, and further refers to the paintings as being named "Piasau". There is no independent value to Jones as his account (Jones (1838), pp. 52–58) closely follows that of Russell (1836), but Armstrong (1887) and Bayliss (1908, 1909) had mistakenly thought Russell did not publish until 1848, making Jones the precursor in their minds.)

=== 1812 Stoddard book ===
Major Amos Stoddard in his 1812 book on the Louisiana Territory (1805–1812) described the "Piasa" rocks discovered by the French explorers, and stated that these "Painted Monsters", known to contemporaries as "piesa", were located high on a perpendicular rock, and still clearly visible ("still remain in a good degree of preservation").

Wayne Calhoun Temple casts doubt that the mural could have survived to 1812 when they were nearly effaced in 1698, "unless they had been restored by someone". A different witness somewhat later, Hon. Murray McConnel (Note: State senator) observed the rock in 1824, but saw nothing but "blotches of rusty-looking discoloration, such as stained the exposed faces of the cliffs generally" (papers of physician John Francis Snyder, 1830–1921).

=== 1836 John Russell account ===
The monster depicted in the mural gained enduring recognition as the "Piasa Bird" after John Russell (of "Bluffdale", 3 miles north of Eldred, Illinois) published his piece "The Piasa: An Indian Tradition of Illinois", published in the August 1836 issue of The Family Magazine, signed J.R. Russell republished the piece later under his full name in 1848 in the Evangelical Magazine and Gospel Advocate. John Russell was a professor of Greek and Latin at Shurtleff College, Upper Alton, Illinois.

A "John Russell" also wrote a drastically different version of the tale, identifying the bird as a condor, published in the Oct. 28, 1847 issue of the Illinois Journal of Springfield. Although Temple assumed this was the same John Russell, John E. Hallwas (1982) deduced this was an assumed name by some other unidentified author, based on circumstantial (Note: Russell was at Grafton, Illinois as editor for the Backwoodsmen in 1837, but he was not living in Illinois in 1847, according to Hallwas.) and stylistic reasons.

The article (1836, 1848) claimed the origin of the word to be from a nearby stream: "This stream is the Piasa. Its name is Indian, and signifies, in the Illini, "The Bird That Devours Men". The original Piasa Creek ran through the main ravine in downtown Alton, and was completely covered by huge drainage pipes around 1912. According to the story published by Russell, the creature depicted by the painting was a huge bird that lived in the cliffs (in a cave which Russell also claimed to have explored, strewn with human skulls and bones Russell claimed that this creature attacked and devoured people in nearby Indian villages shortly after the corpses of a war gave it a taste for human flesh. The legend claims that a local Indian chief, named Chief Ouatoga, managed to slay the monster using a plan given to him in a dream from the Great Spirit. The chief ordered his bravest warriors to hide near the entrance of the Piasa Bird's cave, armed with bows and poisoned arrows. Ouatoga then acted as bait to lure the creature out into the open. As the monster flew down and attacked the Indian chief, the "Master of life" held and invisible shield over him to ward him, and seizing the opportunity, his warriors slew it with a volley of deadly arrows. Russell claimed that the mural was painted by the Indians as a commemoration of this heroic event.

==== Admissions of embellishments ====
Russell made an admission to author William McAdams that his version of the story was "somewhat illustrated". It emerged later that he had also confessed to his son Spencer Gideon Russell (1828–1906) that the story was woven out of Marquette's account and his own imagination. (Note: Aforementioned John F. Snyder papers apud Temple (1956), p. 11) (Note: Dunphy (1996) stated "..scholars have long noted that Russell later admitted to his son that the story was simply fiction that had been inspired by the account of those eerie bluff paintings seen by Marquette and Jolliet". Dunphy (2018) does not repeat this claim, but emphasizes as the "incredible portion of this tale" Russell's claim to have been led to an actual cave laden with the skulls and bones of the victims of the bird monster.)

While different researchers conclude Russell's piece of Indian folklore was nothing but fiction, they differ in opinion on the writer's mindset. Wayne Calhoun Temple thought "He certainly never intended for this fanciful tale to be accepted as a historical article, but the reading public did just that", i.e., a tall tale that he expected the readership to perceive as such. This is disputed by John E. Halwas, who feels Russell willfully labeled his work as "Indian tradition", and succeeded in "passing [it] off" as genuine. (Note: "..was successful in passing off his tale as an authentic Indian tradition")

To complicate matters, Spencer G. Russell, despite his confession about his father, claimed to have shared in witnessing the mural painting firsthand while a student. But the sketch he produced of what he saw was a virtual replica of the well-circulated "McAdams" drawing (purported to be by W. Dennis, 1825, cf. § 1887 McAdams book) only with a different arrangement of the tail and lack of the terminating tail-fin, which was damning rather than corroborating evidence for W. C. Temple, who counted the younger Russell's claim among the roster of various "winged" claims postdating the elder Russell's original 1836 "bird" fiction.

Thus one major point of contention among researchers is that Russell's imagery of the Piasa as bird (or dragon) does not square with Father Marquette's original account which made no mention of wings.

==== 1838 Edmund Flagg ====
In 1838, novelist Edmund Flagg (Note: Having obtained the information in 1836, Flagg published October 1838 or later (date signed in his preface).) and A.D. Jones later in the same year published what is assumed to be retellings of Russell's story, with neither Flagg nor Jones acknowledging debt to Russell.

Even though Flagg's The Far West (1838) gave credit to various sources by name, it omitted mentioning Russell, even though his version of Ouatoga's strife with the Piasa bird was almost a verbatim copy of Russell's.

==== 1838 A.D. Jones ====
A.D. Jones (1838) without acknowledging Russell, provided an alternate account chief "Owatoga" and the monstrous "Piasau Bird" that diverged in many details, Jones "attempted to sensationalize the tale" no doubt, but probably earnestly knew only oral versions of the legend he had learned word-of-mouth, leading to discrepancies.

==== 1844 L ====
Subsequent a writer only identifying himself/herself as "L" contributed a piece to the Alton Telegraph (1844), claiming Russell's version of the narrative was erroneous, and told what was purportedly the genuine version, which was actually transmitted by the Potawatomi tribe, who held the hero to be twins named Peasayah and Onecaw.

==== 1847 pseudo-Russell ====
In 1847, a pseudo-John Russell published an alternate version of the narrative in 1847, in an entirely different style, claiming a hero name Alpeora had fought a man-eating condor.

==== 1873 Beem ====
Martin Beem (1873) also published a version, possibly a synthesis of an oral version of Russell combined with the "Lover's Leap" motif.

==== Fact or fiction ====
As already presented for individual cases, Temple's 1956 paper "The Piasa Bird: Fact or Fiction?" generally concluded that most of the supposed traditional Indian tales similar to Russell's tale, but appearing afterwards, to be all retellings.

Other folklorists would allow that different versions of the same heroic tale about a warrior defending himself against the bird using an invisible shield (Note: Russell, quoted by various.) was known to different native groups. Goddard offers a similar explanation that "There are inconsistencies in some of the [19th century] descriptions, but these can be ascribed to variant recollections or interpretations of the deteriorating figures".

==== 1963 Allen anthology ====
(Wassatoga/Massatoga version)

John Willis Allen, president of the Illinois Folklore Society, published a version entitled "Bird of Evil Spirit" (1963), featuring Wassatoga ([mis]spelt Massatoga at one place) as the young Illinois chief who volunteered himself to be the decoy against the Piasa, and his archers who lay in ambush shot the bird dead. John W. Allen considered this an example of the widely disseminated thunderbird myth.

Karl Shuker (1995) published a retelling with the hero's name fixed as Massatoga. (Note: Thus this [mis]spelt "Massatoga" has stuck in the cryptozoologist community, elsewhere Loren Coleman (2001) Mothman; and also used by David Hatcher Childress (1992), frequent commentator on ancient astronauts theories, which often tries to interpret ancient petroglyphs in this extraterrestrial context.)

=== 1857 Henry Lewis illustration ===
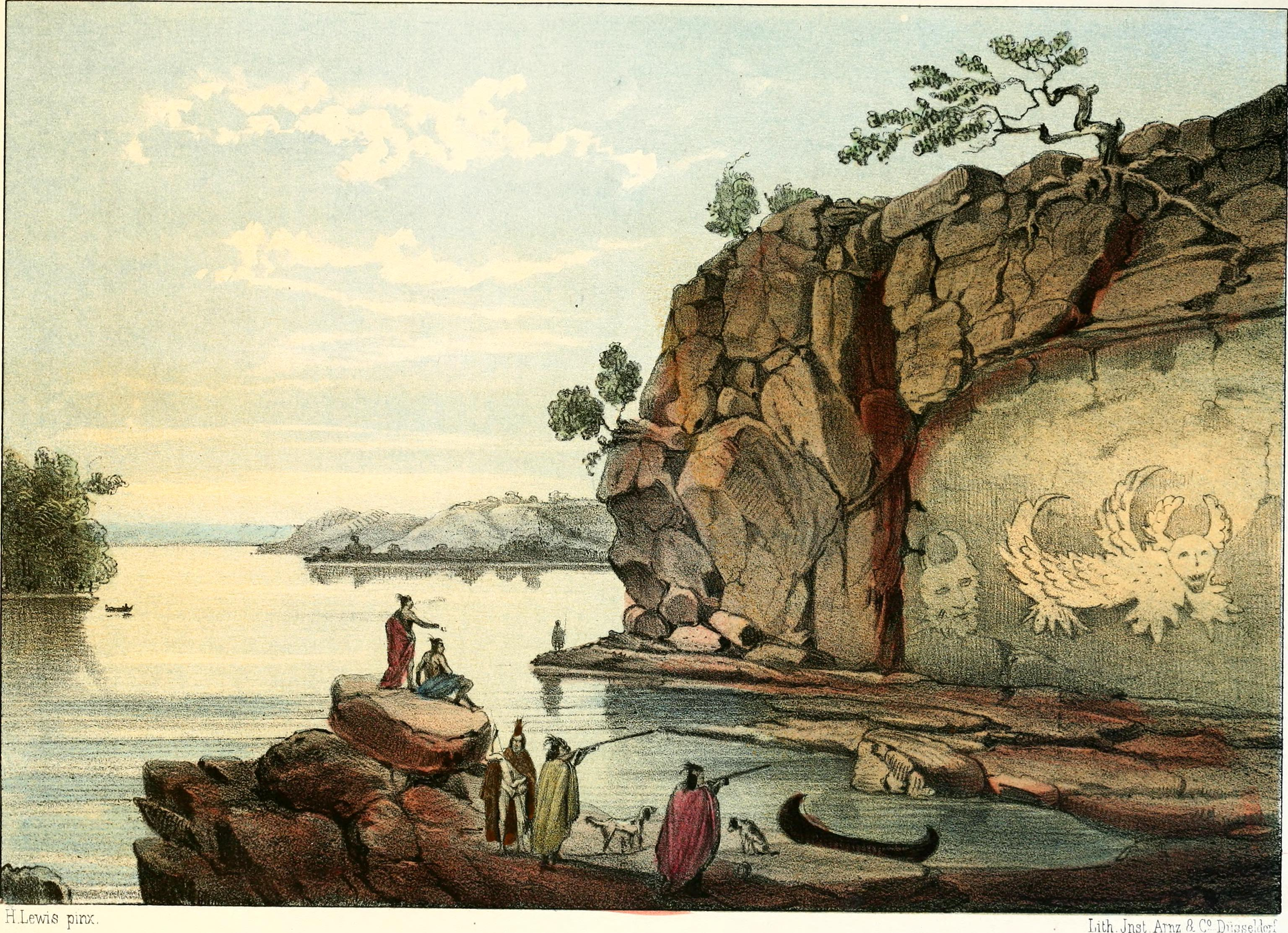
The Piasau Rock —Henry Lewis, published in Douglas, George B. (1857) Illustrierte Mississippithal.

The mural was purportedly witnessed by George B. Douglas during a trip he mounted (c. 1846 accompanied by painter Henry Lewis. Douglas published his finding in a book Das illustrirte [sic] Mississippithal (1857) (Note: The publication date was wrongly given by McAdams (1887), p. 9 as 1839, T. F. Nelson as cited in Bayliss (1909), p. 76 also guessed the year to be about 1858, which was off.) written in German, alongside Lewis's painting of the Piasa mural (image right). Douglas wrote that the paintings occurred at the formation known as Colonade-Cliffs [sic] or the Piasa-Bluffs at the mouth of the Piasa Creek, where "die Gestalt eines enormen Volgels mit ausgedehnten Fittigen eingehauen ist (the figure of an enormous bird with outstretched wings is carved)". Though Lewis's composition places the mural at a seemingly low level, Douglas explained it actually occurred at a sheer height that seemed inaccessible by ordinary human means.

If Lewis made the trip in 1846, he was could conceivably have seen the piasa before the whole face of the bluff was quarried away in 1846 or 1847. (Note: According to McAdams, who thought the mistook the book publication to be 1839,McAdams (1887), p. 9 so believed Lewis could have viewed in ample time before the destruction.) (Note: Karl Shuker "In or around 1856.. quarry work.. shattered the artwork") Francis Parkman (Note: Owner of the copy of the 17th century New France map, discussed under § 1678 Franquelin map.) wrote that "In 1867,... a part of the rock had been quarried away", and he himself only saw a huge advertisement sign, which Temple interpreted as "certain" evidence "that by 1867 there was nothing remaining of the controversial Piasa painting".

But alternative sources indicate that the painting on the lithographic limestone quarry was not removed until the late 1870s by the Mississippi Lime Company.

Temple was dismissive of Lewis being an authentic 19th century witness, as was Goddard (1985), (Note: Goddard without clarifying how he knows, dates the trip to 1848, and asserts Lewis could not have possibly viewed the Piasa.) (Note: Bayliss guessed Lewis made a sketch c. 1849 and drew the painting based on it.) who concluded Lewis must have merely reconstructed a picture from gathered information, and not have drawn it from life. Temple hints at a vague iconographic reason for disbelieving, stating Lewis's painting "is not that of a bird but of a dragon-like creature!" Compare Goddard's opinion that wings were added on, "relect[ing] European conceptions of what dragons look like projected onto the unclear pictographs".

However, dragon-likeness does not argue for inauthenticity, insofar as native language linguists such as Gatschet (1899) considered the underwater panther as a dragon species (that manifests as a fire dragon following lightning on lakes), while Hewitt (1937) too glossed piasa to be a "fire dragon". Christopher Carr, on the iconography and lore of "dragons" notes that the "fire dragon" is known among the Iroquois, while "some of the horned snakes possess wings and can fly through the air", and also referred to as "thunderbirds" by the Menomini (Menominee, the tribe Marquette had contacted). Carr calls this a sort of "triform dragon", as it possesses horn, serpent, and eagle wing elements. Note that the stylized wing, standing erect perpendicular to back, occur in other native art. (Note: For example, the wing on the "winged rattlesnake" of the Craig 229 shell cup from Spiro, Oklahoma. Carr catalogues this as an example of a "piasa". Cf. colorized version of shell cup design by Herb Roe, based on a scan of the line art in Brown et al.)

=== 1847 Kurz's attestation ===
In May 1847, Swiss artist Rudolph Friederich Kurz made a second visit to the Mississippi passing through the bluffs near Alton called the Pia rock, famed for the "Indian tradition and an age-old, half-disintegrating hieroglyphic drawing of a colossal eagle, which is said to have played in early days a role similar to that of our dragon, and is reputed to have had, also, his St. George and his secret nook in a fen". In his earlier trip (in March) he made but a few sketches of the bluff, due to lack of foliage making the scene unsuited for landscape subjects. It is not entirely clear if he saw the Piasa "eagle" himself or sketched it. One dismissive view is that Kurz merely related a rehash of Russell's story.

The footnote (by the editor J. N. B. Hewitt) gives the gloss "Plasa: A mythic being, representing the meteor or firedragon".

=== 1887 McAdams book ===
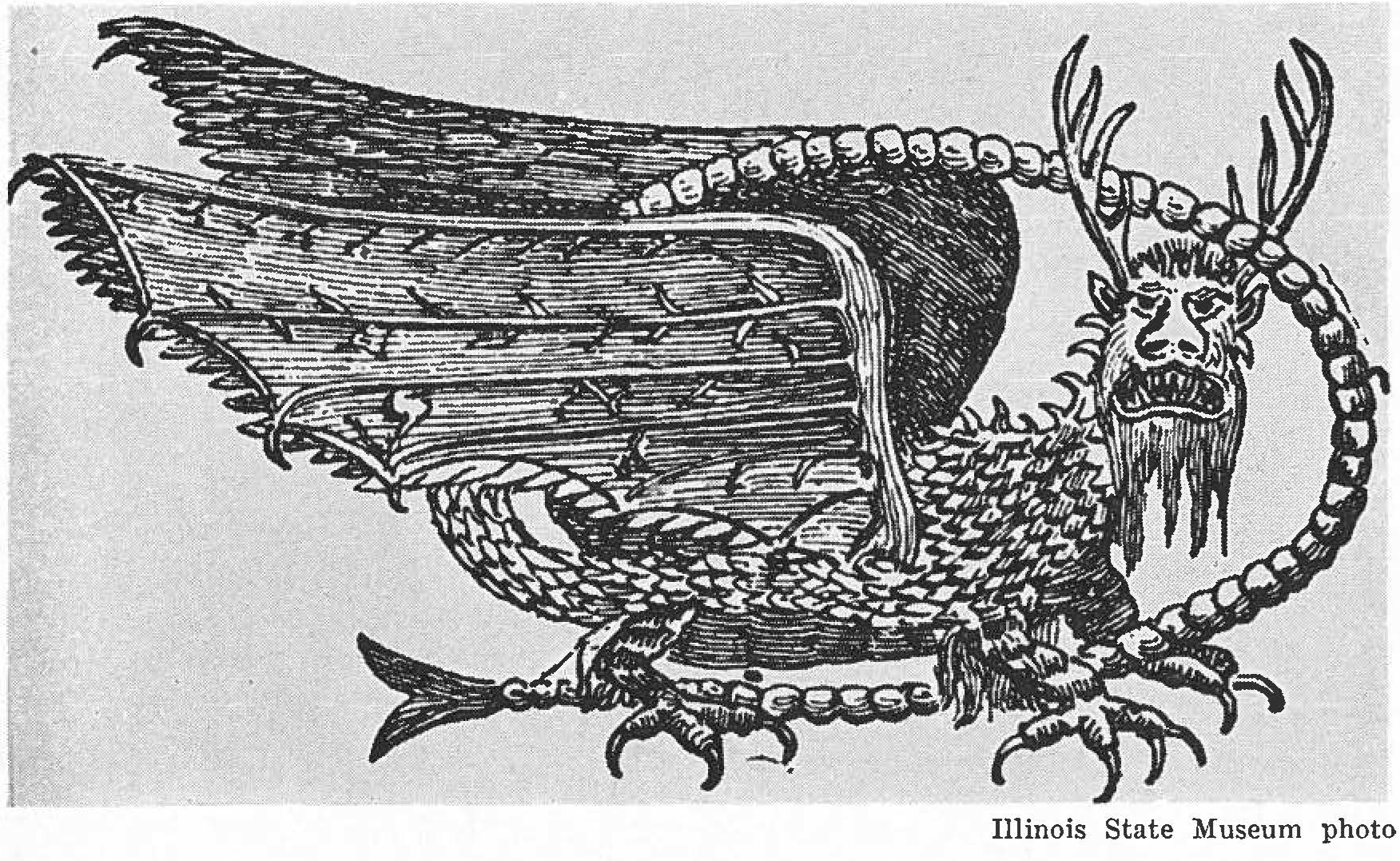
Original of William Dennis's drawing of the Piasa Bird (dated "April 3, 1825" and captioned "FLYING DRAGON" in handwriting) —Illinois State Museum photo

William McAdams (1887) compiled a book Records of Ancient Races in the Mississippi Valley which carried an illustration of the Piasa, which he purported was a drawing by William Dennis, executed on 3 April 1825 (second from top of page, right). This became the best known sketch of the Piasa. McAdams made no claim this was sketched from the actual paintings on the bluff. The man's daughter Georgia McAdams Clifford (1880–1957) also reprinted the drawing, captioned: "William McAdams' drawing of the Piasa from a description of Marquette's sketch of the pictograph which he saw on his first voyage down the Mississippi, in 1673. The Piasa was supposed to have combined bird, animal, reptile and fish in appearance. The descriptions of other early voyagers on the Mississippi as well as the testimony of later residents of this section who had seen the pictograph, corroborate the details of this drawing., etc." (Note: Clifford, Georgia McAdams (1932),) Temple concludes that she had firm knowledge that McAdams drew it. (Note: If she had witnessed the drawing, she would have been a girl aged 7 (at time of publication), or even younger. She might have merely been told afterwards that this happened.) An encyclopedia (2010) interprets rather than "In 1825, local farmer named William McAdams (then aged 10) sketched the Piasa Bird drawings, which he later published in a book". While other recent researchers reject the 1825 date, treat this picture as McAdams (1887), based on Russell's 1836 account.

It has emerged that there was an original version of the William Dennis was signed "Made by Wm. Dennis, April 3rd, 1825" and hand-captioned above as "FLYING DRAGON" (cf. image right). It was in the possession of the Gilham family of Madison County, thus, McAdams had not owned the original copy, and had produced a replica. Note there are differences in the drawings by comparison, especially the facial features.

McAdams (1887) credits one local (Note: Hon. Wm. H. Allen of Grafton) for alerting him that some of that the Piaso (as well as other pictographs on the Alton bluff) became more visible "on certain days when the atmosphere was full of moisture, or after a very wet period, the figure on the rock could be seen much plainer", while another long-time resident stated the wings could be visible or not depending on weather conditions. However, Spencer, son of Russell in his book (1883) held precedent in publishing this atmospheric explanation, and Temple contends that Spencer Russell was "searching for an alibi to explain away" the discrepancy between winged and unwinged versions.

The piasa's descriptions and depictions grew wings, so-to-speak, in the 19th century probably influenced by conceptions of the winged European dragon, or so Goddard surmises. It may be noted however that the widely circulated piasa image bears an uncannily close resemblance to Japanese and Chinese dragons (or to Mongolian art) to some commentators. Or certainly not native art, and resembling something European, a dragon, in the opinion of Dr. Mark J. Wagner.

=== 1887 Armstrong book ===
Perry A. Armstrong (1887) published a different legend on the monster bird, (Note: i.e., not one hero defending his tribe against a monster's peril) an elaborated legend which has at its core the historical tribal conflict between the Miami and the "Mestchegamies" (Mitchigamea) at the mural site, as described earlier. (Note: Tradition recorded by the 17th century French explorers relates that warfare broke out between the Miami and the neighboring Matsigamea (Michigamea, Mitchigamia, Mitchigamea, Michigamies) at a site of the pictographs (§ 1687 Douay and 1697 Hennepin).)

Armstrong contended that in those days, there were two monstrous cave-dwelling birds, described as "two huge monsters, with the body and claws of an alligator, wings of an eagle, but ten times larger; horns of an elk or deer, ears of a fox, face of a man, mouth, teeth and beard of a tiger, and tail of a serpent or fish", known amongst the Indians as devil-birds. One bellowed like a bull, the other roared like a panther, but aside from the terrible noises they issued, originally did not bring humans into harm's way. However, the birds interceded in the tribal wars on the side of the "Mestchegamies" causing the Miami to be routed. However, the Miami joined the Peuotomies confederacy, and this time crushed into oblivion the Mestchegamies who joined the Illinois Confederacy. When the Miami reclaimed their land they noticed the images of the dreaded devil birds or Piasa on the rock. According to native tradition, these birds were to be found "many thousands of moons" before the arrival of white men according to the Illini (or even "several thousand winters before" according to the Miami). (Note: Leading Armstrong to fancy that some paleo-flying reptile (particularly Rhamphorhynchus) had been encountered by early natives, and known in their folklore, though the depictions on rock were made more recently.)

=== 1925 Dr. Long ===
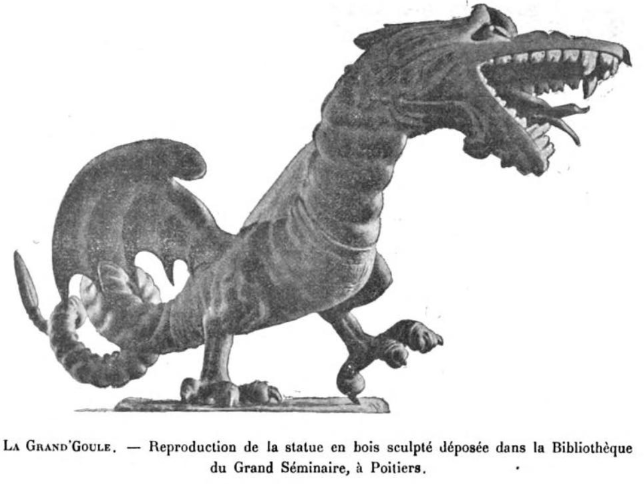
Grande Goule built in 1677 by J. Gagot. —Photographed (c. 1900) when in the custody of Bibliothèque du Grand Séminaire in Poitiers

The Grande Goule is a sort of dragon prop paraded through Poitou, France, i.e., a Poitevin version of the tarasque; (Note: Although Temple states "The first mention of La Grande Goule is as early as 1466", Clouzot clarifies that the charter of 1466 merely mentions that a "dragon" was one among the ensigns and banners) in the procession on Rogation days, i.e., this "dragon" seems to have been only a banner.) such a model was crafted in 1677 and is still preserved (cf. image right). (Note: Now housed in Musée Sainte-Croix in Poitiers.) Physician and author H. W. Long noted that a prototype had been made in 1640 during an epidemic and paraded, and so Marquette or any of his retinue would have been familiar with the design. Long did not believe the painting of the piasa bird (which some said resembled Mongolian art) could have been accomplished by the natives, and proposed a bold hypothesis that it was painted by Marquette's French followers, based on the Grande Goule creature. Temple also agreed Marquette may have known the Grande Goule, but merely proposed that it might have fed his imagination into describing a grander beast than he had actually seen, though it did not impel Marquette into making his beast sprout dragon's wings.

== Twelve pictographs ==
As an aside, a 1859 report described rock "pictures or hieroglyphics" of men, animals and plants on a smooth-surfaced enclave, beneath an overhanging cliff, near the mouth of the Piasa Creek. These were in a crumbling state. (Note: Prairie State 1859, cited by Davidson and Stuve apud Temple (1956), p. 17) (Note: Temple merely commented that these may have been yet another set of paintings different from those described by Marquette, his focus being that the Marquette painting itself had not survived.)

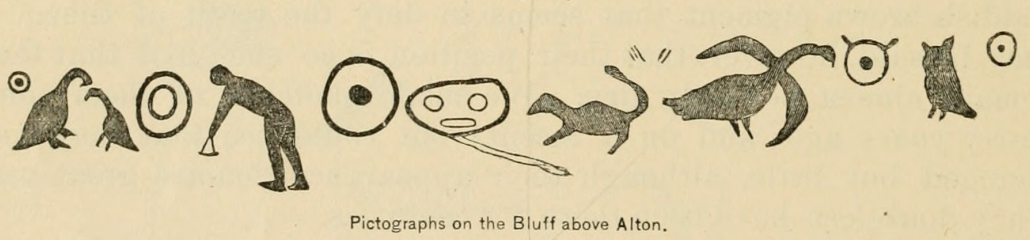
Native American pictographs on a bluff above Alton, Illinois

These "hieroglyphics" were "placed in a horizontal line from east to west" and bear close similarity to the twelve pictograms described and illustrated by McAdams (cf. image right), though the latter were situated above Alton and not by the creek.

In 1905, seven smaller painted images (matching the pictographs photographed by McAdams for his book) were confirmed to have survived at "Levis Bluff", 1.5 miles upriver from the ancient Piasa creature's location, (Note: These pictures were authenticated in the Levis Bluffs area by George Dickson and William Turk in 1905.) and one of the finders (Note: George Dickson) having removed four of these pictographs in 1905, sold them to the Missouri Historical Society (MHS) of St. Louis, in 1921. The four paintings were of "an owl, a sun circle, a squirrel, and a piece showing two birds or some kind of animals in a contest", the other three paintings were of "a great animal, perhaps a lion, and another an animal about as large as a coyote". Three of these pictographs were rediscovered in the late 1990s in the collection of the Missouri Historical Society, including the owl.

Other Native American carved petroglyphs of the same period (Mississippi Culture period) and same general area are carved into the rocks at Washington State Park in Missouri, about 60 miles southwest of the current Piasa image.

== Restoration efforts ==
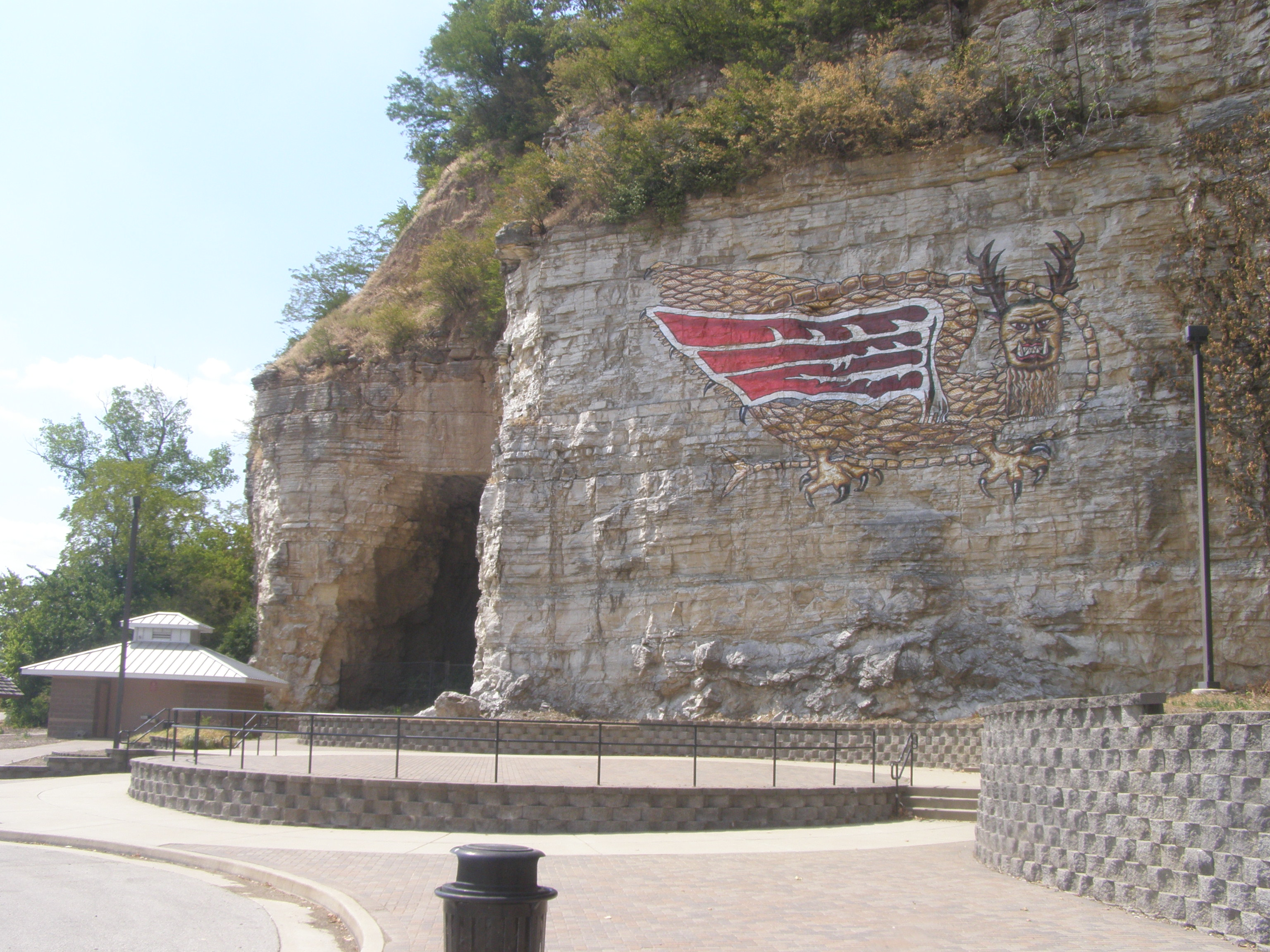
Restored Piasa Bird carving along the Mississippi River near the junction with the Illinois River.

Restoration of the Piasa Bird at Alton has been ongoing since the early 20th century. In 1924 Herbert Forcade, an 18-year old Boy Scout painted a likeness on the cliff, and presented it to the city on 4 October 1924.

Irvin H. Mawdsley repainted this in 1935, mostly in yellow tone, but again repainted it in 1938, using reds and greens.

It was allowed to fade almost indiscernibly, but there were still faint outlines remaining and restored (in the 1940s?) by the Alton Boy Scouts.

In 1952, O.W. Maguire, owner of a local commercial sign workshop offered to underwrite another repainting, provided it would serve as advertisement for the city in a positive way. Based on the drawing by Ruth Means, the painting was executed by Jack Buese (sign painter for the said shop) in collaboration with Eldon Grove (co-worker), (Note: Announced 12 September.) and the 30 by 18 feet (9.1 m × 5.5 m) painting was dedicated on 12 October 1952.

Destroyed in 1961, another painting was made in 1963–4 by Ben DeMond and assistants to replace it.

In 1983, the local Rotary Club chapter installed a metal sculpture replica, but it had tumbled by 1995–6. Abandoning the steel-frame version, the city went back to painting the wall directly. The project commissioned artist Dave Stevens to complete the 22 by 48 feet (6.7 m × 14.6 m) rock painting, which was completed by him in 1999. This is the same mural which currently remains displayed on the cliff. (Note: File:Piasa-Bird-Alton-IL.jpg (photographed 2008) can be compared with the painting attributed to Stevens in the 2022 Fox2 piece, and verified to be the same. These can be compared to a more recent street view on Google Map (photographed April 2026).) Meanwhile, the metal structure was salvaged and used as a mascot piece at Southwestern High School.

Piasa Park has an observation deck built on its premises to view the cliff art.

== See also ==
- Chimera
- Horned Serpent
- Manticore
- Teratorn
- Thunderbird (mythology)
- Underwater Panther
