= Senator Wilcox (disambiguation) =

Leonard Wilcox (1799–1850) was a U.S. Senator from New Hampshire from 1842 to 1843. Senator Wilcox may also refer to:

- Benjamin M. Wilcox (1854–1912), New York State Senate
- Carlos Wilcox (politician) (fl. 1860s), Louisiana State Senate
- Craig Wilcox (born c. 1967), Illinois State Senate
- Edward A. Wilcox (1830–1910), Illinois State Senate
- Fred M. Wilcox (South Dakota politician) (1858–1938), South Dakota State Senate
- Fred M. Wilcox (Wisconsin politician) (1870–1944), Wisconsin State Senate
- Roy C. Wilcox (1891–1975), Connecticut State Senate
- Roy P. Wilcox (1873–1946), Wisconsin State Senate
- Sujata Gadkar-Wilcox (born 1979), Connecticut State Senate

== See also ==
- Kathleen Wilcoxson (born 1948), Oklahoma State Senate
