= Zoe Burrell Bayliss =

American college dean (1879 – 1951)

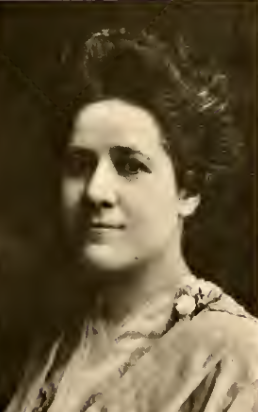
- Zoe Burrell Bayliss, from the 1921 yearbook of Kent State Normal College
- Born: August 14, 1879; Illinois
- Died: August 31, 1951; Madison, Wisconsin
- Occupation(s): Dean of Women, educator
- Parent(s): Alfred Bayliss; Clara Kern Bayliss

Zoe Burrell Bayliss (August 14, 1879 – August 31, 1951) was an American educator. She was Dean of Women at Kent State Normal College, and in the University of Wisconsin system.

== Early life and education ==
Bayliss was raised in Sterling, Illinois, the daughter of Alfred Bayliss and Clara Marie Kern Bayliss. Her father was a college president and politician; her mother was an educator and writer. She graduated from Western Illinois State Teacher's College and the University of Chicago. She earned a master's degree at the University of Wisconsin in 1931.

== Career ==
Bayliss taught education courses and was Dean of Women at Kent State Normal College. She was Dean of Women at the University of Wisconsin–Whitewater from 1923 to 1928, and Assistant Dean of Women at the University of Wisconsin–Madison from 1928 until 1943. In 1931, during the last years of Prohibition, she testified that she was unaware of any drinking "on the part of young ladies" at Wisconsin, which drew some mocking disbelief from faculty colleagues and the student newspaper.

Bayliss was active in the education honor society Pi Lambda Theta, and was vice-president of the society's Madison chapter. She was also active in the local chapter of Altrusa. In 1934, she served a term as president of the Wisconsin Association of Deans of Women. "Dean Bayliss's widely known lively humor and sense of fair play endeared her to students and colleagues alike," recalled a Wisconsin newspaper in 1955.

== Publications ==
- "How to Grow Bulbs in the Schoolroom" (1916)
- "The Princess Beautiful, or, The Wait-a-Bit Bush" (1916)
- "How to Teach India" (1918)
- "A Study of the Factors Contributing to the Unsatisfactory Scholastic Attainment of First Year Women Students" (1934)

== Personal life and legacy ==
Bayliss lived in Madison with her mother from 1930 until her mother's death in 1948, at age 99. Bayliss died in 1951, at the age of 72, in Madison. A cooperative women's dormitory at the University of Wisconsin named for Bayliss opened in 1955, and remains in operation as of 2023.
