= Senator Castle =

Senator Castle may refer to:

- James Castle (politician) (1836–1903), Minnesota State Senate
- Mike Castle (1939–2025), Delaware State Senate
- Miles B. Castle (1826–1900), Illinois State Senate
