= Orville Hickman Browning =

American politician (1806–1881)

Orville Browning
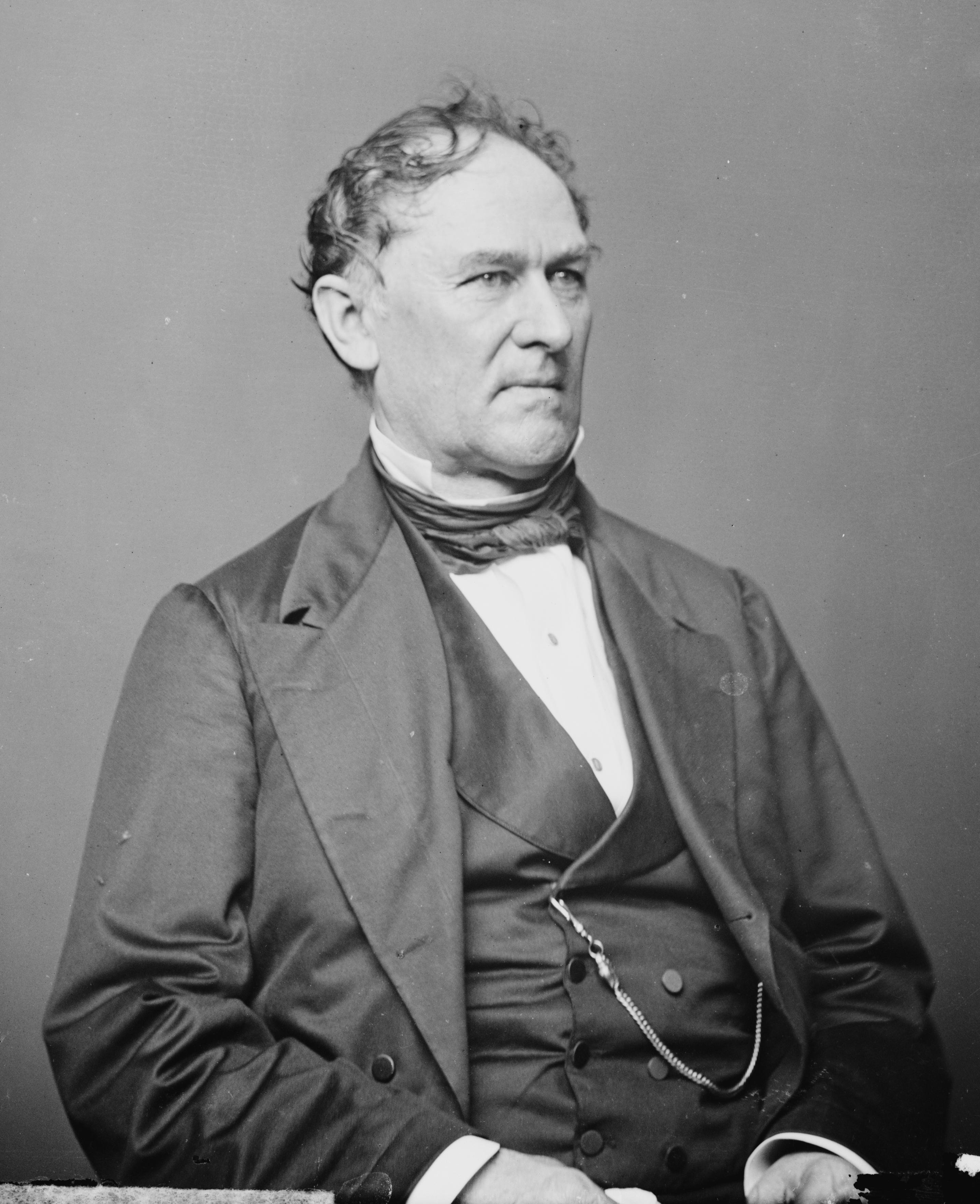
- Photograph c. 1855–1865

9th United States Secretary of the Interior
- In office September 1, 1866 – March 4, 1869
- President: Andrew Johnson
- Preceded by: James Harlan
- Succeeded by: Jacob Dolson Cox

United States Senator from Illinois
- In office June 26, 1861 – January 12, 1863
- Appointed by: Richard Yates
- Preceded by: Stephen A. Douglas
- Succeeded by: William Richardson

Personal details
- Born: Orville Hickman Browning; February 10, 1806 Cynthiana, Kentucky, U.S.
- Died: August 10, 1881 (aged 75) Quincy, Illinois, U.S.
- Party: Whig (before 1856); Republican (1856–1869); Democratic (1869–1881)
- Spouse: Eliza Caldwell (m. 1836)
- Education: Augusta College

Military service
- Allegiance: United States
- Branch/service: Illinois Volunteers
- Battles/wars: Black Hawk War

Orville Hickman Browning (February 10, 1806 – August 10, 1881) was an attorney in Illinois and a politician who was active in the Whig and Republican parties. He served as a U.S. senator and the 9th U.S. secretary of the interior.

Born in Kentucky, and trained as a lawyer, Browning settled in Illinois, where he served in the militia during the Black Hawk War, established himself as a successful attorney, and became involved in politics as a Whig. He served in the Illinois State Senate and the Illinois House of Representatives, and ran unsuccessfully for the U.S. House of Representatives. When the Whig Party broke apart in the mid-1850s and the Republican Party was formed as the country's major anti-slavery party, Browning took part in the convention that organized the party in Illinois.

In 1861, Browning was appointed to the United States Senate seat left vacant by the death of Stephen A. Douglas; he served until January 1863, after which he resumed practicing law. After the death of Abraham Lincoln, Browning became a supporter of Andrew Johnson. In 1866, Johnson named Browning as Secretary of the Interior, and Browning served until the end of Johnson's term in March 1869.

After leaving office, Browning practiced law in Washington, D.C., and Illinois. He was elected as a Democratic candidate for a delegate's position at the 1869–1870 Illinois constitutional convention. He died in Illinois in 1881.

== Early life ==
Browning was born in Cynthiana, Kentucky, on February 10, 1806, the son of Sally (Brown) Browning and Micaijah Browning. Sally Brown was the daughter of James Brown, a judge in Bourbon County. Micaijah Browning was a prominent merchant and farmer who also served as a justice of the peace, member of the county court, and presiding county court judge. (Note: The county court judges did not hear legal cases, but functioned the way a board of commissioners or a county legislature and executive does in most states.) Orville Browning attended Augusta College in Augusta, Kentucky, studied law with his uncle William Brown, and attained admission to the bar in 1831.

== Start of career ==
After becoming an attorney, Browning moved to Quincy, Illinois, where he established a practice in partnership with Nehemiah Bushnell. During the 1832 Black Hawk War he served in the Illinois Militia. Active in politics as a Whig, he served in the Illinois State Senate from 1836 to 1840, and the Illinois House of Representatives from 1842 to 1844. His military and political careers overlapped Abraham Lincoln's; as a result of their involvement in Whig politics and their shared Kentucky backgrounds, Lincoln and Browning became lifelong friends.

In 1844, Browning successfully defended five men who had been accused of the murder of Joseph Smith, founder of the Latter Day Saint movement. Browning was an unsuccessful candidate for election to Congress in 1843, 1850, and 1852. In May 1856, he was a delegate to the convention in Bloomington, Illinois which was held in opposition to the Kansas–Nebraska Act, one of the events that led to the creation of the Republican Party.

== National politics ==
In 1861, Browning was appointed to the United States Senate, filling the vacancy created by the death of Stephen A. Douglas. He did not run for a full term, and served from June 1861 to January 1863. During his time in the Senate Browning served as the chairman of the Committee on Enrolled Bills. He remained in Washington after his term expired, and resumed the practice of law. President Andrew Johnson appointed Browning as Secretary of the Interior in 1866, and he served until the end of Johnson's term in 1869. From March to July 1868 Browning also served as the interim U.S. Attorney General following the resignation of Henry Stanbery.

== Later life ==
After leaving office, he worked as a Washington lobbyist and lawyer in partnership with Edgar Cowan, Thomas Ewing and others. He won election as a Democrat to the Illinois Constitutional Convention of 1869–1870.

== Death and burial ==
Browning died on August 10, 1881 in Quincy and was buried at Woodland Cemetery there. The Quincy Post Office and Courthouse is named for him.

== Family ==
Browning's siblings included: Talitha Ann; Amanda; Miranda; Marcus Elliott; Milton Davis; Zelinda Field; Ann Davis; and Elizabeth Brown.

In 1836, Browning married Eliza H. Caldwell, a native of Kentucky. They had no children, but became the parents of a foster daughter whose mother had died. Emma Lord resided with the Brownings from the age of five; she became the wife of Orrin Skinner, an attorney who practiced in New York and later moved to Chicago. Skinner was later revealed to be a conman, and he was arrested several times for check forgery and other frauds. Skinner died in New York's Auburn Prison in 1896.

== Sources ==
=== Books ===
- Eicher, John; Eicher, David (2001). Civil War High Commands. Stanford, CA: Stanford University Press. ISBN 978-0-8047-3641-1.
- Johnson, Andrew; Bergeron, Paul H. (2000). The Papers of Andrew Johnson. Vol. 16. Knoxville, TN: University of Tennessee Press. ISBN 978-1-57233-091-7.
- Lewis, William Terrell (1893). Genealogy of the Lewis Family in America. Vol. 1. Louisville, KY: Courier-Journal Job Printing Co.
- Oaks, Dallin H.; Hill, Marvin S. (1979). Carthage Conspiracy: The Trial of the Accused Assassins of Joseph Smith. Champaign, IL: University of Illinois Press. ISBN 978-0-252-00762-0.
- Schroeder-Lein, Glenna R.; Zuczek, Richard (2001). Andrew Johnson: A Biographical Companion. Santa Barbara, CA: ABC-CLIO. p. 37. ISBN 978-1-57607-586-9.
- Sobel, Robert (1990). Biographical Directory of the United States Executive Branch, 1774-1989. Westport, CT: Greenwood Press. p. 48. ISBN 978-0-313-26593-8.
- Tucker, Spencer C. (2013). American Civil War: The Definitive Encyclopedia and Document Collection. Vol. I. Santa Barbara, CA: ABC-CLIO. ISBN 978-1-85109-677-0.

=== Newspapers ===
- "Orrin Skinner's Operations: His Career in Chicago and Swindles in San Francisco" (PDF). New York Times. New York, NY. December 29, 1884.
- "Notorious Swindler Dies in Prison". Lawrence Weekly World. Lawrence, KS. September 24, 1896 – via Newspapers.com.

== Bibliography ==
- Dictionary of American Biography.
- Baxter, Maurice G. (1957). Orville H. Browning, Lincoln's Friend and Critic. Bloomington: Indiana University Press.
- Pease, Theodore Calvin; Randall, James G., eds. (1925–1931). The Diary of Orville H. Browning, 1850–1881 (2 vols. ed.). Springfield, Ill.: Illinois State Historical Society.

U.S. Senate
Preceded by Stephen A. Douglas	U.S. Senator (Class 2) from Illinois; 1861–1863; Served alongside: Lyman Trumbull	Succeeded by William Alexander Richardson
Political offices
Preceded by James Harlan	United States Secretary of the Interior; 1866–1869	Succeeded by Jacob Dolson Cox
