= Jean-François Buisson de Saint-Cosme =

Canadian missionary (1667–1706)

Jean-François Buisson de Saint-Cosme (born 30 January 1667[baptized 6 Feb. 1667]–1706) was a Canadian missionary, born in Pointe Levis, Quebec, ordained in 1690 (under the secular Séminaire des Missions Étrangères), engaging in missionary with the Natchez people of the Lower Mississippi Valley, and later murdered by native Sitimaches (Chitimacha, who once occupied portions of the Valley).

Jean-François was son of Michael Buisson or Bysson, a native of St. Cosme de Vair (Saint-Cosme-en-Vairais) in the Diocese of Le Mans, and of Suzanne de Licerasse (Delicérasse, de Lizeiras). He came from a family with a high level of devotion to the Catholic Church. His brother Michel became a priest, a sister Marie-Françoise was a nun of the Hôtel-Dieu, and an unidentified sister was a nun of the Congrégation de Notre-Dame. His parents administered a farm for the seminary of Quebec at Île Jésus. He was parish priest of Les Mines (Grand Pré) parish, Acadia from about 1692 until 1697 during the period of Joseph Robineau de Villebon and appears to have been less than successful in this pursuit.

Despite his lack of success in Acadia, Father St-Cosme become one of the pioneers of the struggling missionary work undertaken by his secular mission and by the Jesuits in the Mississippi Valley. By the end of 1704, he was alone in this work. He was murdered, with three French companions and a slave, while descending the Mississippi.

Around 1698, St. Cosme followed Rev. Francis Jolliet de Montigny and Rev. Anthony Davion of the same seminary to the lower Mississippi (and at first stationed at Tamarois, present-day Cahokia, Illinois, not Tamaroa) then transferred to the Natchez, working with the Natchez in the Grand Village, which eventually led to him marrying the Great Sun's (King of the Natchez) sister - Tattooed Arm. In the Natchez culture, it is not the Great Sun's offspring who inherit the position it is the Great Sun's sister's offspring. Sometime around 1705 Tattooed Arm gave birth to St. Cosme's son who would be the last Great Sun before the French ultimately tried to eradicate the Natchez in retribution for the massacres of Frenchmen, women and children in 1729. See Natchez Massacre. Saint Cosme's son, the Natchez King, was sent to the West Indians in 1731 and made to work as a slave.

In 1706, St. Cosme was with several traders who had hired the natives to guide them. When encamped on the banks of the Mississippi River, they were murdered and robbed by Chitimacha men.

On Dec 6, 1698, (Note: The year is 1698, not 1699 when the letter is probably dated, as the account continues into January.) he mounted on a trip down the Mississippi to the Missouri River, and found paintings on the rock structures vernerted by the natives, but "almost effaced" by then. This is identified to have been the so-called Piasa rock that had been first noted by the Jesuit missionary and explorer Jacques Marquette (near Alton, Illinois). He reached the Tamarois mission (in Cahokia) on the next day.
