= Nehemiah Bushnell =

American politician

Member of the Illinois House of Representatives from the 37th district
- In office 1872 – 1873
- Succeeded by: John Tillson

Personal details
- Born: October 9, 1813 Westbrook, Connecticut
- Died: January 31, 1873 (aged 59) Quincy, Illinois
- Party: Republican
- Profession: Attorney

Nehemiah H. Bushnell (October 9, 1813 – January 31, 1873) was an American attorney, railroad president, and politician from Connecticut. A graduate of Yale University and the Harvard School of Law, Bushnell settled in Quincy, Illinois to practice law with Orville H. Browning. He was named the president of the Northern Cross Railroad and facilitated its integration into the Chicago, Burlington and Quincy Railroad. He was elected to the Illinois House of Representatives in 1872, but died only weeks into its first session. He is the namesake of Bushnell, Illinois.

== Biography ==
Nehemiah H. Bushnell was born in Westbrook, Connecticut, on October 9, 1813, son of Nehemiah and Mehitable Bushnell. He was the 5th great grandson of Francis and Ferris (Quenell) Bushnell, who emigrated from England, landing in Fair Haven, CT in 1639. Nehemiah married Eliza Hunter Benedict of Millbury, Mass. on October 13, 1840. He attended public schools, then studied privately at Amherst Academy. He then matriculated at Yale University in 1831, where he graduated in 1835. He attended the Harvard Law School in 1836, then studied under Samuel Ingham in Connecticut. Bushnell was admitted to the bar the next year. He then set out to Quincy, Illinois, where he established a law office with Orville H. Browning. Bushnell maintained this legal partnership until his death. He briefly edited the Quincy Whig.

In 1851, Bushnell was appointed president of the Northern Cross Railroad. He extended the railroad from Quincy to Galesburg, Illinois. Bushnell, Illinois, a town founded between the two cities in 1854, was named in his honor. He remained president until 1861, when the line was integrated into the Chicago, Burlington and Quincy Railroad (CB&R). He then became the attorney for the CB&Q. Bushnell founded the Quincy Railroad Bridge Company in 1867, which built a bridge for the CB&Q across the Mississippi River.

Bushell accepted a nomination for the Illinois House of Representatives in 1872 and was elected to the 28th General Assembly. However, on January 31, 1873, two weeks into the first legislative session, Bushnell died from erysipelas in Quincy.
