= Newton R. Casey =

American doctor and politician

Dr. N. R. Casey

Member of the Illinois House of Representatives from the 1st district
- In office 1866 – 1870
- Preceded by: Henry W. Webb
- Succeeded by: H. Watson Webb

Member of the Illinois House of Representatives from the 51st district
- In office 1872 – 1874

Personal details
- Born: January 27, 1826 Jefferson County, Illinois, U.S.
- Died: June 6, 1899 (aged 73) Mound City, Illinois, U.S.
- Party: Democratic
- Profession: Physician

Newton R. Casey (January 27, 1826 – June 6, 1899) was an American doctor and politician from Illinois. A son of Zadok Casey, Casey attended Ohio University and practiced medicine in Benton and Mount Vernon, Illinois. In 1858, he moved to the newly established Mound City, Illinois, where he became their longtime mayor. A supporter of Stephen A. Douglas, Casey was elected to three terms in the Illinois House of Representatives.

== Biography ==
Newton R. Casey was born in Jefferson County, Illinois on January 27, 1826. He was the son of Zadok Casey, the fourth Lieutenant Governor of Illinois (1830–1833) and a five-term U.S. Representative. His brothers were Samuel K., Thomas S., and John R. Casey. Casey attended public schools until 1838, when his father sent him to Hillsboro Academy. Two years later he studied at Mount Vernon Academy, and then was accepted to Ohio University in 1842. Casey graduated three years later and returned to Mount Vernon, Illinois to study medicine under Dr. John W. Corwin. In 1847, Casey moved to Benton, Illinois and founded a medical practice with a Dr. Towns.

Casey practiced in Benton for a year before again returning to Mount Vernon. He attended courses at the Missouri Medical College in 1856–1857, receiving a medical degree. He then moved to Mound City, Illinois, a city founded by his father-in-law three years earlier. Casey was elected to the city council the next year and was elected mayor in 1859. He held the office of mayor until 1874. Casey was a delegate to the 1860 Democratic National Convention, supporting eventual candidate Stephen A. Douglas. When the Mound City Civil War Naval Hospital was founded in 1861, Casey volunteered his services. He eventually was named assistant surgeon, and held that position for most of his life.

In 1866, Casey was nominated by the Democratic Party for a seat on the Illinois House of Representatives. He was re-elected two years later. In both terms, Casey was the Democratic nominee for Speaker of the House, but the Republican Party held the majority in both sessions and Casey was defeated. Although defeated in a re-election bid following the 1870 state redistricting, he was re-elected in 1872. He was again nominated and defeated in a bid for Speaker. During this term, he successfully rallied support to build a monument at Mound City National Cemetery. Casey largely retired from politics in 1874 to focus on his medical practice, though he was elected to one more term as Mound City mayor in the 1880s.

Casey married Flora Rawlings on December 4, 1847. They had three children: Ida M., Frank R., and Maude H. Casey died in Mound City, Illinois after a brief illness.
