= Alfred Bayliss =

American politician

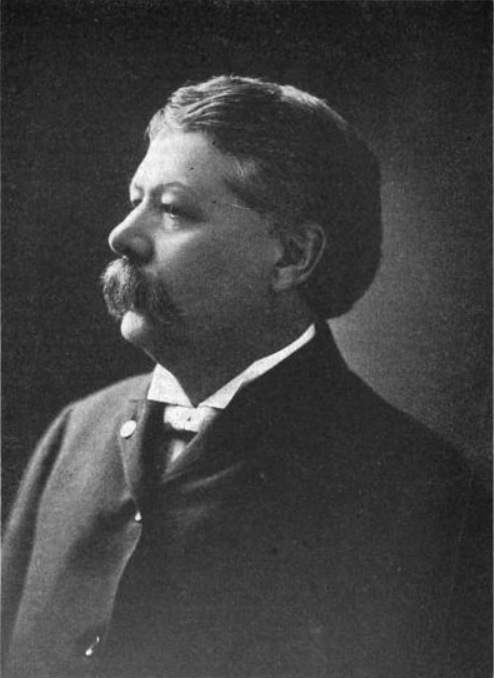

Alfred Bayliss (March 22, 1847 – August 26, 1911) was an English American educator from Gloucestershire. Orphaned shortly after his family emigrated to the United States, Bayliss worked his way into Hillsdale College in Michigan. After a two-year break to fight in the Civil War, Bayliss graduated in 1870 and first oversaw schools in Indiana. He then came to Streator, Illinois to lead a school district, becoming superintendent of a high school in 1896. In 1898, Bayliss was elected Illinois Superintendent of Public Instruction. He later served as the second president of the Western Illinois State Normal School before falling to his death from a horse.

== Biography ==
Alfred Bayliss was born in Bledington, England on March 22, 1847. He emigrated to the United States with his family when he was a child, settling in Hillsdale, Michigan. Bayliss was orphaned when he was twelve. When he was fifteen or sixteen, he matriculated at Hillsdale College. However, he withdrew in 1863 to enlist in the 11th Michigan Volunteer Cavalry Regiment for the Civil War. He returned to college after the war, graduating in 1870.

Bayliss' first position out of college was superintendent of schools in LaGrange County, Indiana. In 1874, he took a position as superintendent of school district #3 in Sterling, Illinois. Bayliss spent the next twenty years in the district. He then ran for Illinois Superintendent of Public Instruction as a Republican, but was defeated in the primary by Samuel Inglis. Bayliss assumed the editorship of the Streator Standard, then served in the role of first assistant clerk of the 39th Illinois General Assembly. Bayliss also edited The Child-Study Monthly periodical. In 1896, he was named Superintendent of Streator Township High School. He ran for the state superintendent again in 1898 and was elected. He served two consecutive four-year terms. Bayliss advocated for free high school education, although the state legislature did not adopt the idea. In 1906, Bayliss became the second President of the Western Illinois State Normal School, a role he held until his death.

Bayliss served as the president of the Northern Illinois Teachers' Association and vice president of the Illinois State Teachers Association. He was also a member of the State Committee on Educational Progress. In Streator, he served on the city council, commanded the Grand Army of the Republic chapter, and was once the chairman of the LaSalle County Republican Party. He married Clara Marie Kern, who became a social activist and author, in 1871; they had two daughters. On August 26, 1911, Bayliss died from injuries he sustained eleven days earlier after falling from a horse in Woodbine, Iowa. He was buried in Oakwood Cemetery in Macomb, Illinois.
