= William H. Condon =

American politician

William Henry Condon

Member of the Illinois House of Representatives from the 4th district
- In office 1872 – 1876

Personal details
- Born: October 17, 1843 Tribes Hill, New York
- Died: unknown
- Party: Democratic
- Profession: Attorney

William Henry Condon (October 17, 1843 – ?) was an American lawyer, author, and politician from New York. The son of immigrants, Condon worked as a clerk in a freight office, then moved to Chicago, Illinois to study maritime law. He served for four years in the Illinois House of Representatives. Later, Condon became an advocate for memorializing James Shields, publishing a biography and raising funds for his statue at the National Statuary Hall.

== Biography ==
William Henry Condon was born in Tribes Hill, New York on October 17, 1843. His parents, Mary (O'Brien) and Robert, immigrated from Ireland seven years earlier. Condon was educated in a public school in Rouses Point, New York until he was eleven, when he was forced to drop out due to poor health. In the meantime, Condon worked as a clerk in his father's store. When he was eighteen, he enrolled in a one-year course at Chaplain's Academy. After a brief stint teaching school, he took a position as a clerk in a freight office, where he worked for five years.

On August 11, 1866, Condon moved to Chicago, Illinois to study law. He was admitted to the bar and focused on maritime law. In Richmond v. Moore, which reached the Supreme Court of Illinois, he successfully argued that businesses could legally transact on a Sunday. In 1872, Condon was elected to the Illinois House of Representatives as a Democrat, where he served two consecutive two-year terms. He later lobbied to approve a $100,000 appropriation to found the Illinois Industrial Home for the Blind in Chicago, approved in the early 1890s. Condon also raised $9,000 for a bronze statue of Senator James Shields in the National Statuary Hall in Washington, D.C. In 1900, he published Life of Major-General James Shields: Hero of Three Wars and Senator from Three States.

Condon was a Catholic and served two terms as president of the Union Catholic Library Association. He was also a member of the Sheridan Club.
