= Jairus C. Sheldon =

American politician

Jairus Corden Sheldon

Member of the Illinois Senate from the 30th district
- In office 1872 – 1876
- Preceded by: new district
- Succeeded by: Chester P. Davis

Personal details
- Born: November 2, 1827 Clarence, New York
- Died: September 18, 1905 (aged 77) Urbana, Illinois
- Party: Republican
- Profession: lawyer, real estate

Jairus Corden Sheldon (November 2, 1827 – September 18, 1905) was an American politician who served in the Illinois General Assembly.

== Biography ==
Jairus Corden Sheldon was born in Clarence, New York on November 2, 1827, to Corydon and Eunice (Brown) Sheldon. His family moved to Clarksfield, Ohio when he was a child. He worked in the shipbuilding trade in Huron, Ohio, then attended Baldwin University in Berea. He taught in Perrysville, Indiana, and then relocated to Champaign County, Illinois in 1853.

Sheldon briefly farmed, and then joined in the Illinois Central Railroad as an engineer and surveyor. In 1855, he joined the law office of Col. W. N. Coler in Urbana. He founded a partnership with Frank G. Jacques in 1861 and practiced until 1866, when he decided to focus on real estate investment. Sheldon eventually purchased over 1,000 acres (400 ha) in the county.

Sheldon was elected as a Republican to the Illinois House of Representatives in 1870, later serving in the Illinois Senate. He notably advocated for funds to build University Hall, the main building for the Illinois Industrial University. He left the party in 1888 to join the Prohibition Party, and ran as its candidate that year for United States Congress. After his son died in 1893, Sheldon donated substantial funds for the construction of a new church for the First Methodist Episcopal Church of Urbana.

Sheldon married Eunice M. Mead in 1854. They had five children. He died at his home in Urbana on September 18, 1905.
