= Otto Peltzer (politician) =

American politician

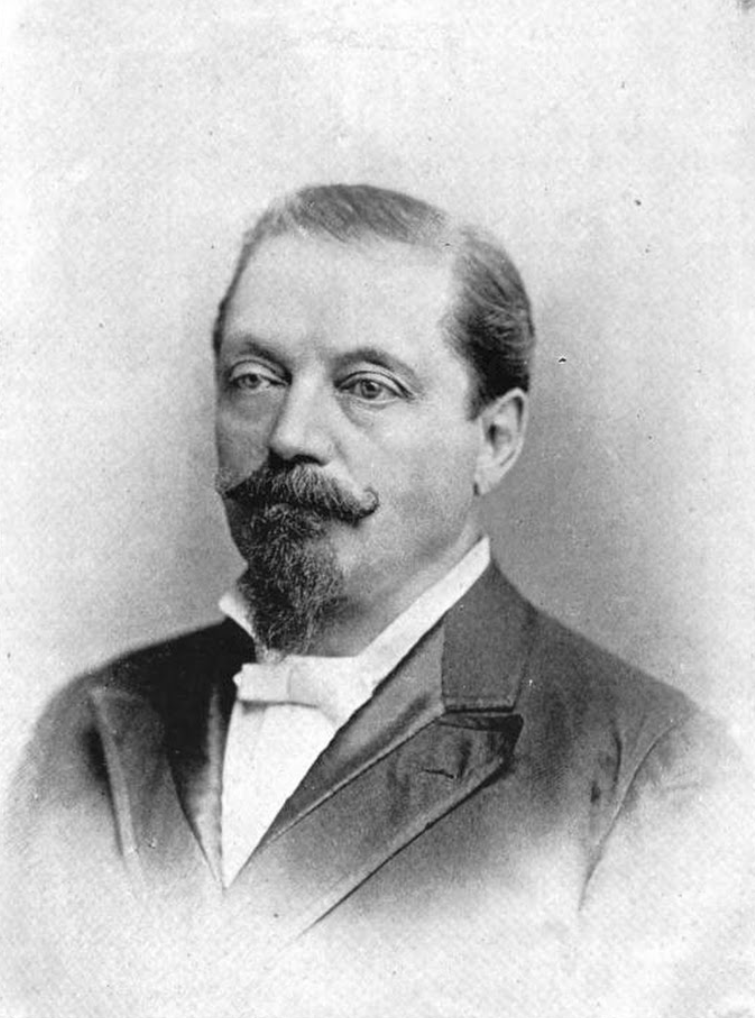

Member of the Illinois House of Representatives from the 6th district
- In office 1872 – 1874

Personal details
- Born: November 29, 1836 Stolberg, Prussia
- Died: January 17, 1919 (aged 82) Oak Park, Illinois
- Party: Liberal Republican
- Profession: Tax collector, playwright

Otto Peltzer (November 29, 1836 – January 17, 1919) was a German American politician, author, and playwright. Born in Prussia, Peltzer immigrated with his family when he was a child and came alone to Chicago, Illinois in 1850. There, he rose through the ranks of the department of public works, eventually becoming deputy recorder of Chicago. He served one term in the Illinois House of Representatives. In his free time, Peltzer translated and wrote works of stage.

== Biography ==
Otto Peltzer was born on November 29, 1836, in Stolberg, Prussia. In 1849, his family immigrated to the United States and established a farm in Wisconsin. When Peltzer was thirteen, he moved to Chicago, Illinois and took a position in the Chicago recorder's office. In 1857, he decided to pursue a career in law, but abandoned the efforts three years later. Peltzer then became chief draughtsman of the board of public works, where he supervised the dock surveys of the Chicago River and compiled the city atlases. In 1869, he was elected collector of taxes of northern Chicago.

In 1871, the Great Chicago Fire destroyed all records of the city and county, so Peltzer quickly published the Atlas of Chicago, organized from his personal collection. In 1872, he was elected to the Illinois House of Representatives as a Liberal Republican, where he served one two-year term. He introduced bills for compulsory education, for a state board of health, and for licensing for surveyors, physicians, and pharmacists. He returned to the board of public works after his term, then was named deputy recorder in December 1876. In April 1878, he resigned and opened a title and abstract office as Otto Peltzer & Co.

In his free time, Peltzer enjoyed writing, particularly for stage works. In 1868, he translated the "Masons' Lord's Prayer" into English, which became a popular recital at Freemasonry meetings. He translated Karl Gutzkow's Uriel Acosta, a tragedy about the life of Uriel da Costa, which played for several weeks at Crosby's Opera House. Florenz Ziegfeld, Sr., who ran the Chicago Musical College, produced one of his dramatic ballads. One of his dramas of domestic life was performed at McVicker's Theater. In 1887, he founded The Moralist and the Theatre periodical.

Peltzer married Annie Langden in 1861. They had four children, one son and three daughters: Oscar E., Lottie, Laura, and Louise. He died on January 17, 1919, in Oak Park, Illinois.
