= Henry Dresser =

American football and baseball player and coach (1891–1963)

Biographical details
- Born: October 2, 1891; Manhattan, Kansas, U.S.
- Died: November 10, 1963 (aged 72); Baton Rouge, Louisiana, U.S.

Playing career

Football
- 1913: Kansas State
- 1915–1916: Springfield
- Position: Quarterback

Coaching career (HC unless noted)

Football
- 1914: Abilene HS (KS)
- 1920–1923: Springfield Tech HS (MA)
- 1924–1928: Vermont (assistant)
- 1929–1932: Shippensburg

Men's ice hockey
- 1927–1928: Vermont

Baseball
- 1928: Vermont

Administrative career (AD unless noted)
- 1920–1924: Springfield Tech HS (MA)

Head coaching record
- Overall: 16–16–1 (college football)

Henry Owen Dresser (October 2, 1891 – November 10, 1963) was an American football and baseball player and coach. He served as the head baseball coach at the University of Vermont in 1928 and the head football coach at Shippensburg University of Pennsylvania from 1929 to 1932, compiling a record of 16–16–1.

Dresser was later a professor of health and physical education at Louisiana State University (LSU). He died on November 10, 1963, in Baton Rouge, Louisiana.
