= Carlos Wilcox (politician) =

American politician

Carlos Wilcox was a state senator in Louisiana. A Republican, he was a Unionist. He co-founded the Feliciana Savings and Exchange Bank. Wilcox moved to Louisiana during or shortly after the American Civil War.
