= Charles Dunham =

Charles A. Dunham (c. 1832 – 1900) was a spy, forger, and American Civil War journalist. Dunham had at least twelve identities, and is best known for testimony claiming Abraham Lincoln's assassination was ordered by the Confederacy. He wrote for the New York World, New York Herald, and New-York Tribune simultaneously. At one time, he wrote an article for the Herald, a rebuttal of the article in the Tribune. Dunham claimed to have spied on both sides in the Civil War, and, in an attempt to defraud the government, claimed to have raised a legion called the Cameron Guards. Dunham was a lawyer before the outbreak of the Civil War, and claimed to have been conscripted into the Confederate army, where he eventually escaped to the North.
