= Robert J. Cross =

First settler of Roscoe, Illinois and local/state politician

Robert John Cross
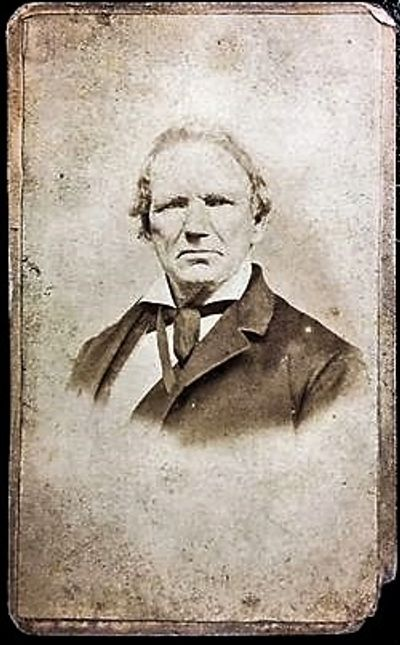
- Born: October 1, 1803. Newburgh, New York
- Died: February 15, 1873 (aged 69); Roscoe, Illinois
- Occupations: Farmer, Politician
- Known for: First settler of Roscoe, Illinois
- Political party: Whig, Republican
- Spouse: Hannah Benedict
- Children: 5

Robert John Cross (October 1, 1803 - February 15, 1873) was an American pioneer. He was the first permanent settler of the town of Roscoe, Illinois, the County Treasurer of Winnebago County, Illinois, and a member of the Illinois General Assembly.

== Personal life ==
Cross was born in Newburgh, New York, the third child of Scots-Irish immigrants Rev. John Cross and Margaret Hanna Cross. In 1825 he moved to Tecumseh, Michigan where he built and resided in a log cabin. In 1830 Cross moved to Coldwater, Michigan. In 1832 he was a private in the Michigan militia where he was mustered to defend Chicago during the Black Hawk War, but the brigade, commanded by General Joseph W. Brown, was mustered out before reaching Chicago. In 1835 Cross moved to Illinois and purchased the first claim made in the town or Roscoe for the purpose of permanent settlement and cultivation, making him the first town settler. His primary occupation was farmer, but he also filled several positions in local government.

== Political career ==
1831: Appointed a member of overseers of highways by highway commissioners in Coldwater, Michigan

1832: Commissioner of highway in Coldwater, Michigan

1832: Justice of the Peace for Coldwater, Michigan, for which he was paid $5

1836: Judge of election for Winnebago County election, for the first election ever held in Winnebago country, for which he was paid $1

1836: Justice of the Peace in Winnebago County

1836: Judge of election for precinct for presidential election

1836–1839: County treasurer for Winnebago County, for which he was paid $2/day or $30, plus 2% commission or $9.28

1841: Vice President of the newly formed Winnebago County Agricultural Society

1845: Member of the state legislature

1846: Elected by the Whigs as Representative to the General Assembly

1847: Delegate from Winnebago Country for the Illinois constitutional convention to revise the constitution of the state, where he was also appointed a member of the committee on the bill of rights

1860: Town of Roscoe Supervisor

1869: Delegate for a second time for the Illinois constitutional convention that formed the present Illinois state constitution

1872–1873: Elected by the Republicans as Representative to the General Assembly; Cross died while holding this appointment

Chairman of the Board of Supervisors in Winnebago County, Illinois, for several years, occupying that position at the time of his death

Township School Fund Trustee for Roscoe, Illinois, for over thirty consecutive years

== Legacy ==
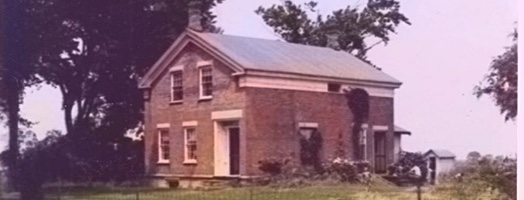
The Robert J Cross home in Roscoe, Illinois was built between 1831 and 1845

The Robert J Cross Memorial Park was dedicated in Roscoe, Illinois in 2018. The park was named for Cross in honor of his contributions to settlement of the Roscoe area and his role in the local, county and state government.

In 2018, the Roscoe Township purchased the property that contains the Robert J Cross home, and designated the development as Founder's Park. Restoration of the home, which was built between 1831 and 1845, began in 2019 by the Roscoe Township Historical Society. The Society is raising private funds to complete the restoration of the homestead exterior.
