= Perry A. Armstrong =

American politician

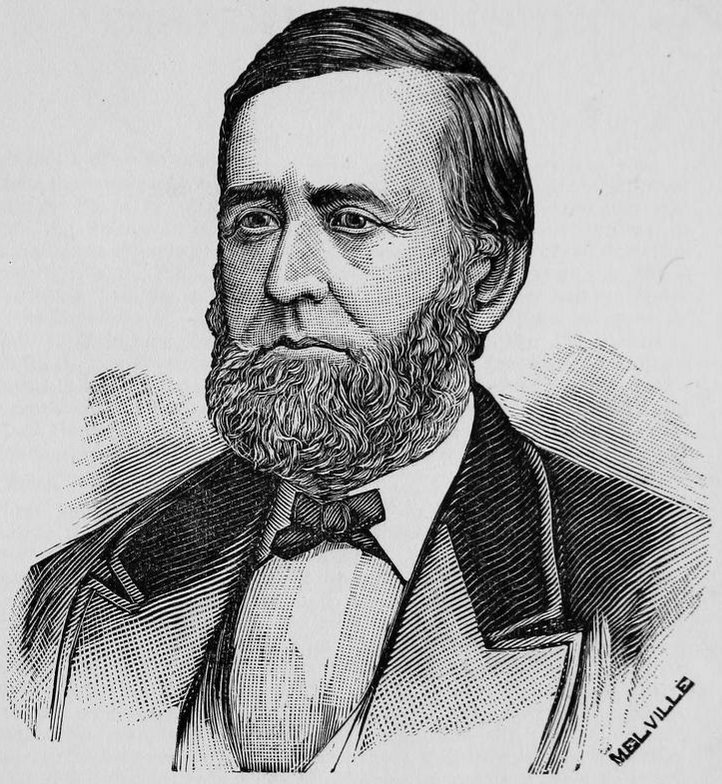
- Perry A. Armstrong

Member of the Illinois House of Representatives
- In office 1863 – 1864

Member of the Illinois House of Representatives from the 13th district
- In office 1873 – 1874

Personal details
- Born: April 15, 1823 Licking County, Ohio
- Died: December 23, 1904 (aged 81) Morris, Illinois
- Party: Democratic
- Profession: Attorney
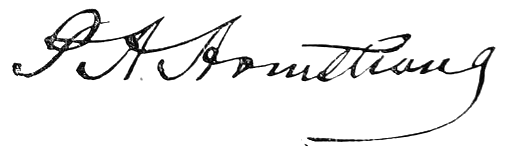
- Signature

Perry Austin Armstrong (April 15, 1823 – December 23, 1904) was a business person, surveyor, attorney, two-time member of the Illinois House of Representatives and historian. Born in Ohio and raised in southern Illinois, he spent most of his adult life in Morris, Illinois.

== Life and career ==
Armstrong was born in Licking County, Ohio and came to Illinois with his mother and brothers in 1831, initially settling at Sand Prairie. During the Black Hawk War, the family retreated for a period of time to Morris, which was to be his future permanent home. He attended Granville Academy, and spent two years at Illinois College. He paid his own way in college through teaching jobs and farm work. When he was twenty he decided to move to Morris, went home to continue school for a brief period, and in 1844 he returned to Morris to live out his life. There he opened a country store, serving also as postmaster. In 1846 he raised a company of volunteers for the Mexican War and was named captain, but the unit was not mustered into service as the Illinois quota had been met by the time word of their organization reached the governor.

In December 1846 he married Mary Borbridge, originally of Pittsburgh, Pennsylvania. They had four sons, three of whom survived into adulthood. He held many civic elected posts in Morris, including town clerk and justice of the peace. He worked on surveys and charters for several railroads in north central Illinois, and was at one time swamp land commissioner.

In 1847 he was a delegate from Illinois to the River and Harbor Convention, serving alongside Abraham Lincoln. In 1862 he was a member of the Illinois Constitutional Convention and that same year was elected to the Illinois House of Representatives, representing Will and Grundy counties.

Armstrong was a war Democrat and always favored the Union, being a friend of both President Lincoln and Senator Stephen A. Douglas. During the war he took on the duty of procuring horses for the army. In 1863 he was admitted to the bar, and formed the law partnership Olin and Armstrong with Benjamin Olin. Olin withdrew from the firm in 1870, and Armstrong ran the firm as sole proprietor from that time forward.

In 1872 he was elected to the 28th Illinois General Assembly.

In his later life he wrote poetry (titles include Child's Inquiry, What is Heaven and Funeral Dirge to General Grant), collected fossils, and wrote a seminal book on the Black Hawk War. In 1903 he became a Corresponding Member of the Chicago Historical Society. He died at his home in Morris in 1904.

== Publications ==
- Armstrong, Perry A. (1887). The Sauks and the Black Hawk war : with biographical sketches, etc. Springfield, IL: H.W. Rokkers.
- Armstrong, Perry A. (1885). Sauk-e-nuk, the ancient city of the Sauks : its location, construction, population, government, antiquity and home life, Black Hawk's Watch-Tower, and Lover's Tomb. Rock Island, IL.
- Armstrong, Perry A. (1876). Historical oration. Morris, IL: Reformer Office.
- Armstrong, Perry A. (1887). The Piasa, or, The Devil among the Indians. Morris, IL: E. B. Fletcher, printer.
