= Clara Kern Bayliss =

American writer

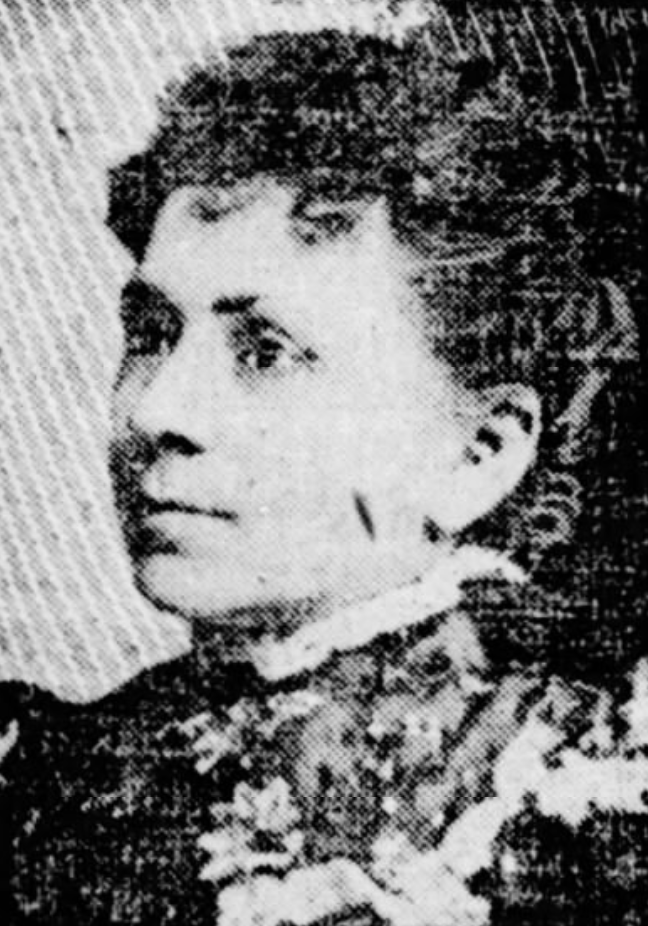
- Clara Kern Bayliss, from a 1901 newspaper
- Born: Clara Marie Kern; March 5, 1848; Kalamazoo, Michigan, US
- Died: March 1, 1948 (aged 99); Madison, Wisconsin, US
- Education: Hillsdale College
- Occupations: Writer, educator, clubwoman
- Spouse: Alfred Bayliss
- Children: 2, including Zoe Burrell Bayliss

Clara Kern Bayliss (March 5, 1848 – March 1, 1948) was an American writer and educator.

== Early life ==
Clara Marie Kern was born on her family's farm near Kalamazoo, Michigan, the daughter of Manasseh Kern (1809–1892) and Caroline Herlan Kern. She was the first woman to graduate from Hillsdale College in Michigan, in 1871. She later earned a master's degree from the same school, in 1874.

== Career ==
Bayliss was head of the Education Committee of the Illinois Congress of Mothers. In that role, she emphasized the need for physical training and manual skills for all children, declaring that "When a child is reared in such a manner that he considers physical labor menial and unbecoming, he has lost the power of correct judgment; he lives in an unreal world, where all things have fictitious values, and he begins to talk of the 'occupation' of owning money". She also encouraged school libraries, and nature study for children.

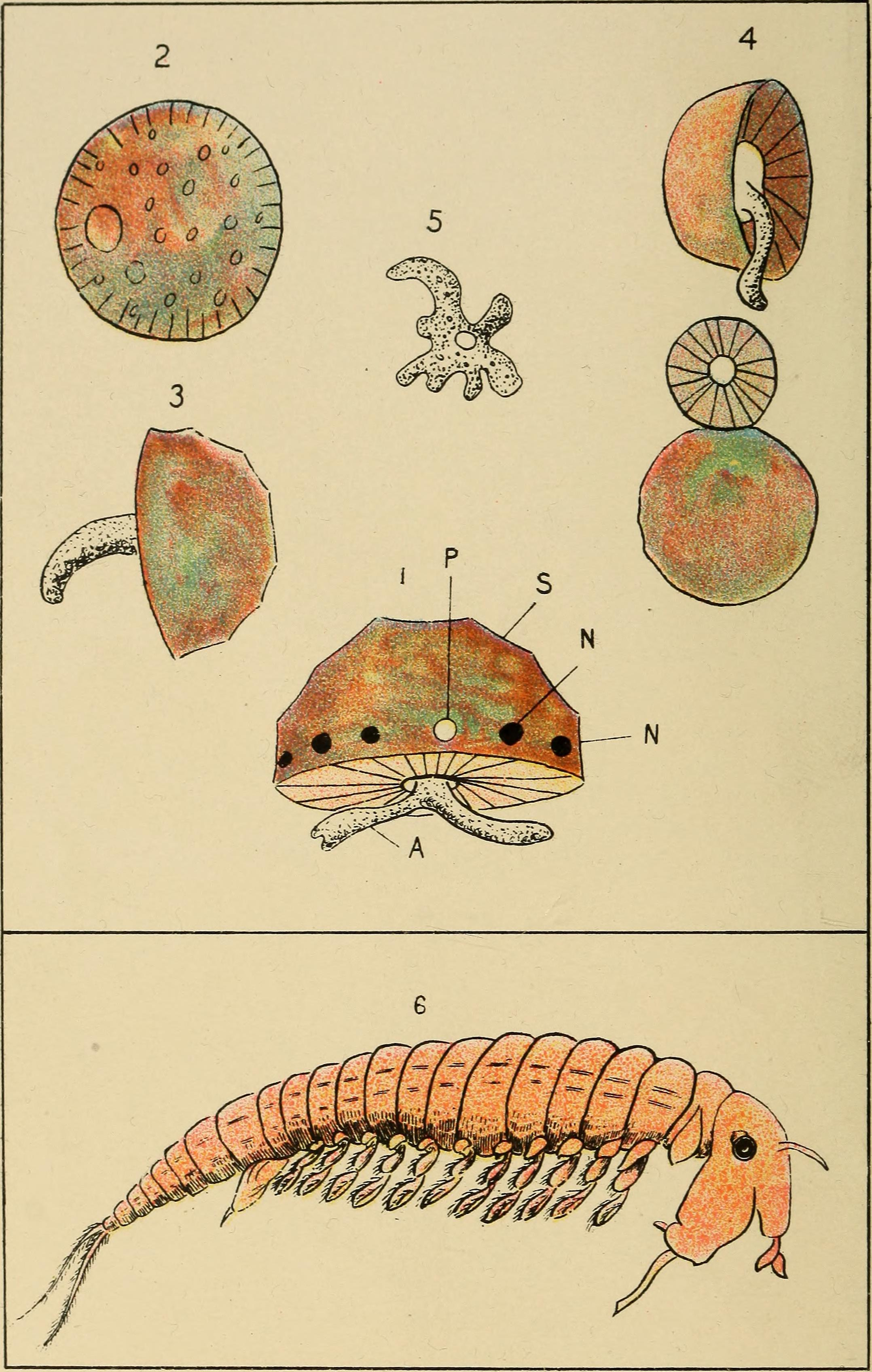
An illustration from Bayliss's first book, In Brook and Bayou (1897).

Bayliss was vice president of the Illinois State Teachers Association. In 1907, she established the Child Culture Center in Macomb, Illinois. She was founder of the Macomb chapter of the Daughters of the American Revolution in 1910. In 1927 she was elected a vice president of the Society of Midland Authors. She supported the creation of an Illinois state museum, to house and study local archaeological finds, which otherwise were sent to neighboring states. She wrote against "the selfishness of men in public", citing excessive smoking, loud whistling, crowding, and other noisome behaviors.

Books by Bayliss included In Brook and Bayou: or, Life in the Still Waters (1897), Lolami in Tusayan (1903), Two Little Algonkin Lads (1907), The Little Cliff Dweller (1908), Old Man Coyote (1908), Philippine Folk Tales (with Berton L. Maxfield, W. H. Millington, Fletcher Gardner, and Laura Estelle Watson Benedict), A Treasury of Indian Tales, and A Treasury of Eskimo Tales (1922). She also wrote about Illinois history for the Illinois State Historical Society, about birds for The Auk, about geography for the School News and Practical Educator, and contributed to The Child-Study Monthly, which was edited by her husband.

Bayliss was the last surviving member of a small group of people chosen to witness the opening of Abraham Lincoln's casket in 1901, when Lincoln's remains were re-interred to prevent vandalism. She was also considered Madison's last surviving Civil War widow.

== Personal life ==
Clara Kern married educator and editor Alfred Bayliss in 1871. They had two daughters, Zoe and Clara. Alfred Bayliss died in 1911. Clara Kern Bayliss died in 1948, just before her 100th birthday, at a hospital in Madison, Wisconsin.
