= Miles B. Castle =

American politician (1826–1900)

Miles Beach Castle

Member of the Illinois Senate from the 13th district
- In office 1872 – 1878
- Succeeded by: John R. Marshall

Personal details
- Born: August 11, 1826 Albany, New York, US
- Died: August 10, 1900 (aged 73) Sandwich, Illinois, US
- Party: Republican
- Profession: Banker

Miles Beach Castle (August 11, 1826 – August 10, 1900) was an American banker, publisher, and politician from New York. Moving to DeKalb County, Illinois in 1856, Castle became a prosperous banker with the Sandwich Bank and Kendall County Bank. He was elected to the Illinois Senate in 1872, where he served three terms.

== Biography ==
Miles Beach Castle was born in Albany, New York on August 11, 1826. His father managed a farm in Dutchess County. Castle attended the Jonesville Academy and, upon graduating in 1846, accepted a clerkship in a dry goods store in Glens Falls. He rose to the rank of store manager by the time he left the company in 1855. That year, he moved westward to Sandwich, Illinois to open a lumberyard. He opened the Sandwich Bank in 1856. Castle married Freelove Kinney Hubbard, the daughter of Asa Kinney, on January 21, 1857. He founded the Kendall County Bank in Yorkville in 1870.

Castle took an interest in Republican Party politics. In 1872, he was elected on the party ticket to the Illinois Senate. He was re-elected twice, serving three two-year terms. He was elected chairman of the Committee on Public Buildings & Grounds. Castle pushed for the first bill for the protection of fishing rights in Illinois. He chaired the executive committee of the Illinois State Equal Suffrage Association. In 1878, he began to publish the Sandwich Argus with his son John. Through his publishing interests, he became a member of the Illinois State Press Association and the Press Club of Chicago. Castle was a Royal Arch Mason. He died at his home in Sandwich on August 10, 1900.
