= Thomas S. Casey =

American politician and judge

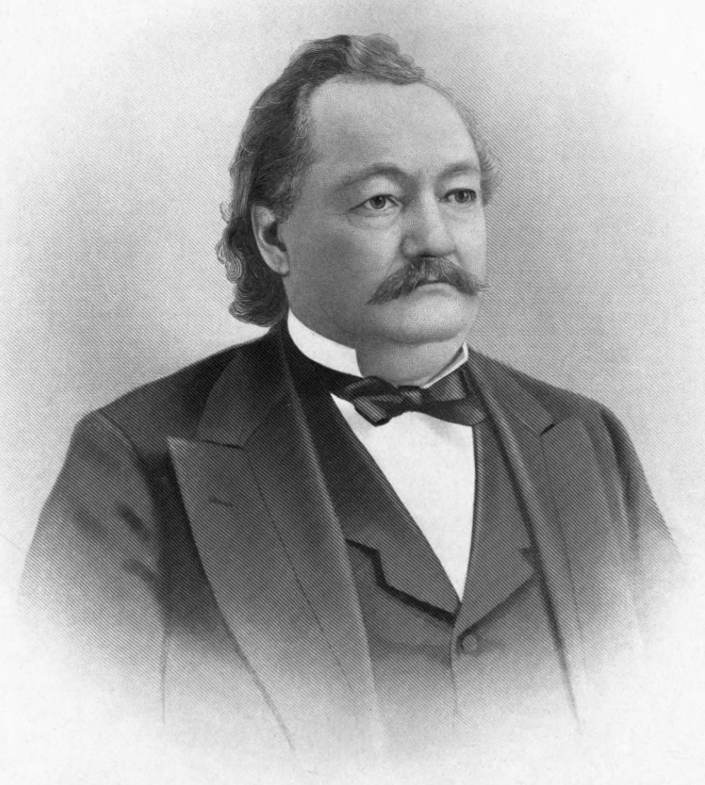

Member of the Illinois Senate
- In office 1872–1876

Member of the Illinois House of Representatives
- In office 1870–1872

Personal details
- Born: Thomas Sloo Casey; April 6, 1832 Jefferson County, Illinois, US
- Died: March 1, 1891 (aged 58) Springfield, Illinois, US
- Party: Democratic
- Education: McKendree College
- Occupation: Politician, judge

Thomas Sloo Casey (April 6, 1832 – March 1, 1891) was an American politician and judge.

== Biography ==
Casey was born in Jefferson County, Illinois and sent to the public schools. He graduated from McKendree College and then studied law. In 1851, Casey was admitted to the Illinois bar. He lived in Mount Vernon, Illinois. In 1860, he was elected state's attorney. Casey served in the Union Army during the American Civil War and was commissioned a colonel. From 1864 to 1868, Casey again served as state's attorney. From 1870 to 1872, he served in the Illinois House of Representatives and was a Democrat. Casey served in the Illinois Senate from 1872 to 1876.Casey then served on the Illinois Appellate Court from 1879 to 1885. Case then moved to Springfield, Illinois, where he practiced law. He died in Springfield, Illinois, from pneumonia. His father was Zadok Casey who served as Governor of Illinois.
