= Quest Academy =

Quest Academy or Quest Charter Academy or Quest School may refer to:

- Quest Academy (California) — a K-12 special education school in Pomona, Los Angeles County, California
- The Quest Academy, Croydon, a secondary school in London, England
- Quest Academy (Sanford, Florida) — a public high school in Sanford, Florida, operated by Seminole County Public Schools
- Quest Academy (Palatine, Illinois) — a private Pre-K to 8 gifted grade school in Cook County, Illinois, founded in 1982 as Creative Children's Academy, and renamed in 1999
- Quest Charter Academy (Peoria, Illinois) — a charter school in Peoria County, Illinois, known as Loucks School when it was a public school
- Quest Charter Academy (Michigan) — a public charter school in Taylor, Wayne County, Michigan, founded in 2009, and owned by for-profit National Heritage Academies
- Quest Academy (Minnesota) — a public charter school in St. Louis Park, Hennepin County, Minnesota, overseen by Pillsbury United Communities, and also called District #4182
- Quest Academy (Nevada) — a school in Las Vegas, Clark County, Nevada
- Quest Academy Charter School (Raleigh, North Carolina) — a private K–8 grade school in Raleigh, Wake County, North Carolina, founded in 1993 as the Helen Paesler School and renamed in 1999
- Quest Academy (Warren County, North Carolina) — an online 6th-12th grade school associated with Warren County Public Schools
- Quest Academy (Ohio) — a K-5 grade school in Lima, Allen County, Ohio, and sometimes called Quest Academy Community
- Quest Academy (Oregon) — a school in Tigard, Washington County, Oregon
- Quest Academy (Utah) — a private K-8 grade school in West Haven, Weber County, Utah
