= Jim Schwantz =

American football player and politician (born 1970)

Mayor of Palatine, Illinois
- Incumbent
- Assumed office May 4, 2009
- Preceded by: Rita Mullins

Personal details
- Born: January 23, 1970 (age 56) Arlington Heights, Illinois
- Education: Purdue University (BA)
- Football career

No. 65, 52, 59
- Position: Linebacker

Personal information
- Listed height: 6 ft 2 in (1.88 m)
- Listed weight: 240 lb (109 kg)

Career information
- High school: Fremd (Palatine, Illinois)
- College: Purdue
- NFL draft: 1992: undrafted

Career history
- Chicago Bears (1992–1993); Dallas Cowboys (1994–1996); San Francisco 49ers (1997); Chicago Bears (1998)

Awards and highlights
- Super Bowl champion (XXX); Pro Bowl (1996); First-team All-Pro (1996); NFL Alumni's Special Teams Player of the Year (1996); Second-team All-Big Ten (1991); Freshman All-American (1988)

Career NFL statistics
- Tackles: 46
- Fumble recoveries: 1
- Stats at Pro Football Reference

James William Schwantz (born January 23, 1970) is an American politician and former football player who is the mayor of Palatine, Illinois. He played as a linebacker in the National Football League (NFL) for the Chicago Bears, Dallas Cowboys, and San Francisco 49ers. He played college football for the Purdue Boilermakers.

== Early life ==
Schwantz attended William Fremd High School, where he was a two-way player in football. He received All-state, All-conference and the coaches top defensive player in Northwest Chicago honors as a senior.

He had a .501 batting average as a sophomore on the baseball team and also started on the basketball team.

== College career ==
Schwantz accepted a football scholarship from Purdue University. He started 5 games as a freshman and was a regular starter as a sophomore at outside linebacker, registering 10 sacks (second in the conference). He had 16 tackles against the University of Notre Dame.

He suffered a broken foot during the summer, sidelining him until the start of his junior season and contributing to him having an off year, finishing with 83 tackles.

As a senior, he was switched to middle linebacker, registering 143 tackles (led the team), 102 solo (led the team), 12 tackles for loss, 2 sacks and one interception (returned for a 66-yard touchdown). He had 18 tackles against the University of California. He was selected Big 10 defensive player of the week, for the 19 tackles and the 66-yard interception return for a touchdown he had against Northwestern University. He also was named to the Dean's List.

At the time, he ended his college eligibility with 363 career tackles (sixth in school history), 18 career sacks (school record), 11 sacks in a season (school record) and 43 career tackles for loss (second in school history).

== Professional career ==
=== Chicago Bears (first stint) ===
Schwantz was signed as an undrafted free agent by the Chicago Bears after the 1992 NFL draft. He was waived in August and signed to the practice squad. On December 25, he was promoted to the active roster to play in the season finale against the Dallas Cowboys, where he made one special teams tackle.

On August 30, 1993, he was released after preseason and signed to the practice squad. On August 28, 1994, he was traded to the defending Super Bowl champions the Dallas Cowboys, in exchange for a sixth round draft choice (#201-Hayward Clay).

=== Dallas Cowboys ===
In 1994, the Dallas Cowboys traded for Schwantz because they were thin at the linebacker position and because he knew their defensive system, having been coached by Dave Wannstedt, who was the team's defensive coordinator before moving on to the Chicago Bears. He was declared inactive for the first 9 games. He finished with 4 defensive tackles, 5 special teams tackles and was a part of the Super Bowl XXX winning team.

In 1995, he continued his development, registering 23 special teams tackles (third on the team), 15 defensive tackles and one pass defensed.

In 1996, he set the franchise's single season record with 32 tackles on special teams (the NFL started keeping the stat in 1990) and was named All Pro as well as to the Pro Bowl as a special teams player.

In 1997, he was declared a restricted free agent at the end of the season and although he was seen as a valuable player, the Cowboys had serious salary cap problems and could only tender him a qualifying offer at his original undrafted signing. On April 14, the San Francisco 49ers signed him to a four-year offer sheet for $2 million that included a $600,000 signing bonus, that the Cowboys chose not to match and did not receive any compensation.

=== San Francisco 49ers ===
In 1997, he registered 18 special teams tackles with the San Francisco 49ers. He was cut on August 25, 1998, after the team decided to keep two younger linebackers (Anthony Peterson and Winfred Tubbs).

=== Chicago Bears (second stint) ===
On August 29, 1998, he was signed by the Chicago Bears as a free agent, to improve the special teams units. He was released on August 18, 1999.

Schwantz played in 78 career games (no starts) and was credited with 39 defensive tackles, amounting to half a tackle per game.

== Mayor of Palatine ==
On February 25, 2008, Schwantz declared his intention to run for mayor of the Village of Palatine, Illinois.

On April 7, 2009, he secured 42% of the vote, defeating 20-year incumbent Rita Mullins, who ended up placing a distant third in a four-way mayoral race. Schwantz was sworn into office as Mayor of Palatine on May 4, 2009. He has been re-elected four times, running unopposed in 2013, 2017, 2021 and 2025, and his current term expires in 2029.

== Personal life ==
Schwantz was a contributor to the WBBM 780AM Chicago Bears broadcast team along with former players Jay Hilgenberg and Tom Thayer. He is the only one of the three who was not on the 1985 Bears team that won Super Bowl XX.
