= Richard A. Mugalian =

American lawyer and politician

Richard Aram Mugalian (April 4, 1922 – March 22, 1995) was an American lawyer and politician.

Mugalian was born in Chicago, Illinois and educated in the Chicago public schools. He served in the United States Army during World War II. Mugulian went to North Central College and to University of Illinois. He also went to Stritch School of Medicine at Loyola University Chicago. Mugalian received his bachelor's and law degrees from University of Chicago. He practiced law with the Wooster & Mugalian Law Firm in Chicago and lived with his wife and family in Palatine, Illinois. Mugalian was involved with the Democratic Party. Mugalian served in the Illinois House of Representatives from 1973 to 1981. Mugalian died from lymphoma at the Loyola University Medical Center in Maywood, Illinois.
