= Palatine Stables =

Palatine Stables is a recreational horseback riding facility located in Palatine, Illinois. Palatine Stables is owned by the Palatine Park District and managed by head trainer Toni Bruns.

== Location ==
Palatine Stables is located at 1510 West Northwest Highway, Palatine, IL 60067. It is located between Northwest Highway and Dundee Road and across from the Deer Grove Forest Preserve.

== Facility ==
The Palatine Park District purchased the facility in 1989, and Palatine Stables is home to approximately 70 horses. The facility features three outdoor arenas, two indoor arenas, and space for turnout.

== Disciplines ==
Palatine Stables focuses primarily on hunter/jumper and equitation. Palatine Stables offers group lessons and private lessons for riders of all ages and ability levels, from beginners to advanced jumpers.

== Services ==
Palatine Stables offers lessons, boarding, training, and a variety of other programs. Young riders can visit the Palatine Stables "Pony Place" for pony rides or host a pony party event.

== Events ==
Palatine Stables hosts horse shows as well as special events several times a year. The Palatine Stables Show Team hosts and competes on the Northern Illinois Hunter Jumper Association circuit as well as on the Illinois Short Circuit. Palatine Stables hosts an annual Fall Festival each October, which features riding demonstrations, pony rides, a petting zoo, crafts, and more. The Stables has also hosted a Winter Open House. There are also Jumping Jackpot Shows, or jumping contests.
