= Gudy Gaskill =

American mountaineer (1927–2016)

- Born: Gudrun Timmerhaus; 1927; Palatine, Illinois, US
- Died: July 14, 2016 (age 89); Denver, Colorado
- Education: B.A. education, Western State College of Colorado; M.A. recreation, University of New Mexico
- Known for: Driving force behind creation of the Colorado Trail

Gudrun "Gudy" Gaskill (1927 – July 14, 2016) was an American mountaineer who is regarded as the driving force behind the creation of the Colorado Trail, a 567-mile (912 km) hiking, biking, and horseback riding path between Denver and Durango, Colorado. Beginning in the 1970s, she helped plan out the route, solicited donations, and recruited teams of volunteers to work in one-week shifts developing the Trail each summer. She was named executive director of the newly formed Colorado Trail Foundation in 1987. She was inducted into the Colorado Women's Hall of Fame in 2002.

== Early life and education ==
Gudrun Timmerhaus was born in Palatine, Illinois, to Paul and Elsa Timmerhaus. She became fond of hiking at age 14 when her father got a job as a summer ranger at Rocky Mountain National Park. As a youth, she also competed in downhill and cross country skiing. She studied at the Western State College of Colorado in Gunnison, earning a degree in education. She later earned her master's degree in recreation from the University of New Mexico.

== Colorado Trail ==
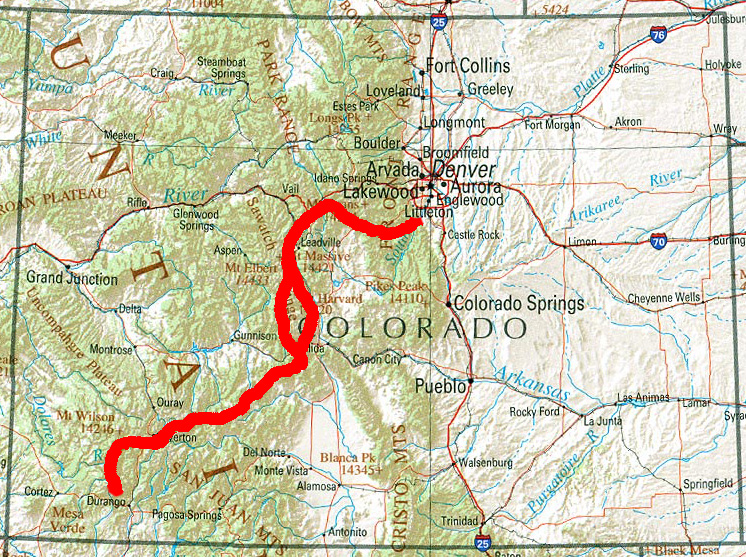
Route of the Colorado Trail

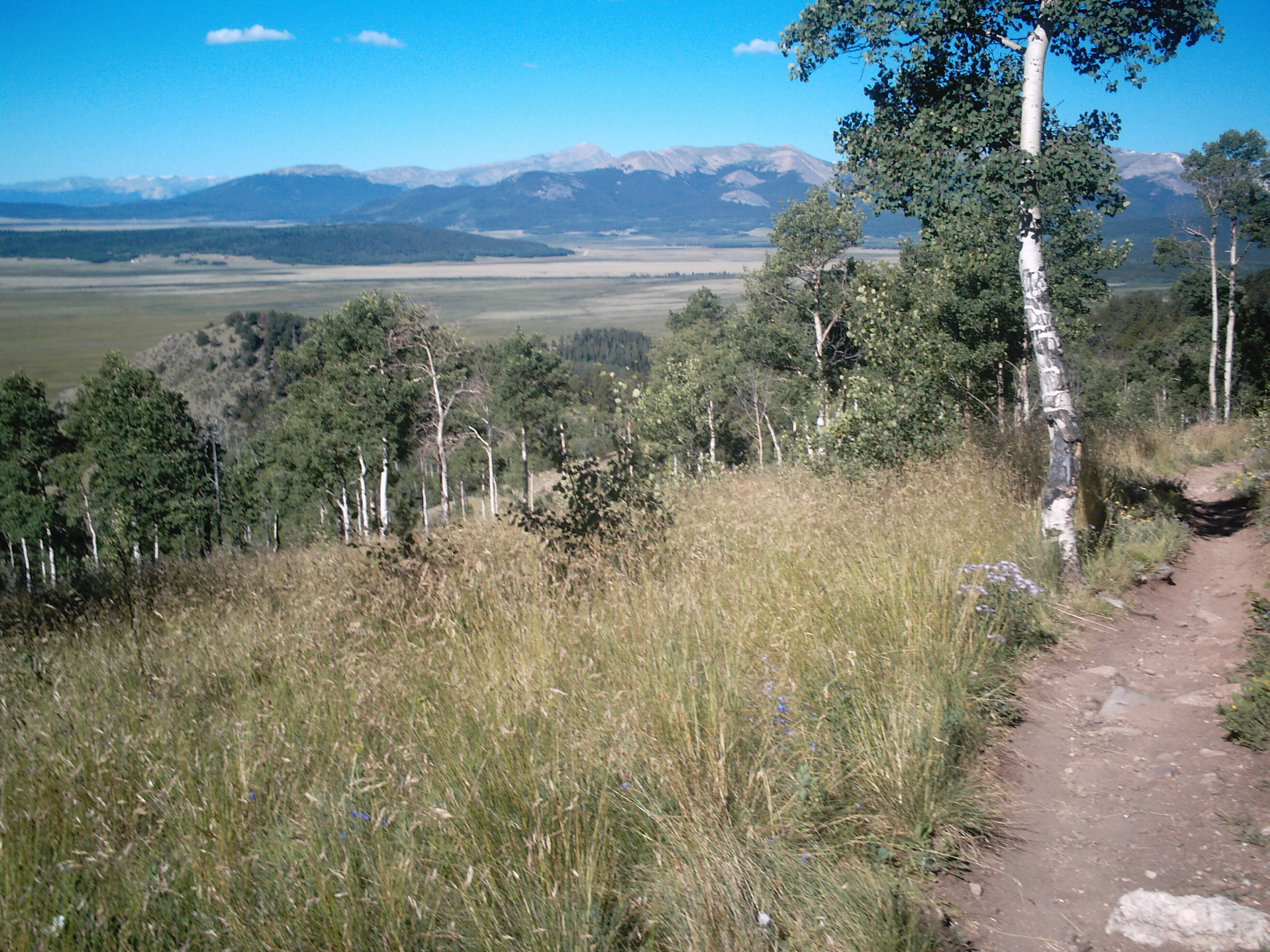
View from the Colorado Trail, overlooking South Park, near Kenosha Pass

Gaskill is credited as the visionary and driving force behind the Colorado Trail, a 567-mile (912 km) long, 3 feet (0.91 m) wide hiking, biking, and horseback riding path between Denver and Durango, Colorado. Gaskill and her husband had joined the Colorado Mountain Club in 1952. In her capacity as chairwoman of the club's Huts and Trails Committee in the 1970s, Gaskill helped plot the early portions of the Trail and recruited teams of volunteers to build several miles of trail each summer in one-week shifts. In 1984, when the Governor of Colorado threw his support behind the project, the project moved more quickly toward completion. Gaskill, who was named executive director of the Colorado Trail Foundation, helped plan new sections, solicited private and corporate donations, and recruited volunteers nationwide. These volunteers numbered more than 10,000. In 1988 the first 470 miles (760 km) of the route were dedicated.

== Memberships ==
Gaskill became the first woman president of the Colorado Mountain Club in 1977. She also served on the board of the American Hiking Society.. She was the Colorado State Coordinator for the 1980-81 HikaNation trip across America.

== Honors ==
Gaskill was honored by President Ronald Reagan in his Take Pride in America campaign, and by President George H. W. Bush in his Points of Light recognition program for volunteerism. She was inducted into the Colorado Women's Hall of Fame in 2002.

Several Trail features were named in her honor. The Gudy Gaskill Bridge, a 141-foot (43 m) span over the South Platte River, was built at the start of Segment 2 of the Colorado Trail. Gudy's Rest is a 1,400-foot (430 m) high scenic overlook of the San Juan Mountains outside Durango. The Gudy Gaskill Loop is a 2.5-mile (4.0 km) scenic trail connecting with the Beaver Brook Trail outside Golden, Colorado.

Posthumously, the Colorado Mountain Club established an annual Gudy Gaskill Award which recognizes female club members who are "a positive and inspirational example of volunteerism". In March 2017 the Colorado General Assembly honored her legacy, with legislators recalling their experiences on the Colorado Trail and a slideshow presentation.

A new elementary school in Littleton public schools has been named in her honor.

== Personal life ==
She and her husband David Gaskill, a geologist, had four children. They resided in Golden. An active mountaineer, she climbed all 54 of Colorado's fourteeners as well as other major mountains of the world.

Gaskill suffered a stroke in early July 2016. She died on July 14, 2016, in Denver, aged 89.

== Bibliography ==
- Gaskill, David L.; Gaskill, Gudy (2002). Peaceful Canyon, Golden River: A Photographic Journey Through Fabled Glen Canyon. Colorado Mountain Club Press. ISBN 0967146658.

== Sources ==
- Colorado Trail Foundation (2011). The Colorado Trail: The Official Guidebook (8th ed.). Mountaineers Books. ISBN 978-1937052225.
- Heise, Sandy; Gaug, Maryann (2017). Best Hikes Near Denver and Boulder (2nd ed.). Rowman & Littlefield. ISBN 978-1493024827.
- Robertson, Janet (1991). Day Hikes on the Colorado Trail. American Traveler Press. ISBN 1558381163.
- Robertson, Janet (2003). The Magnificent Mountain Women: Adventures in the Colorado Rockies (Revised ed.). University of Nebraska Press. ISBN 0803289952.
