= Bryan Anderson (author) =

American veteran of the Iraq War, author and spokesperson

Sergeant Bryan Anderson
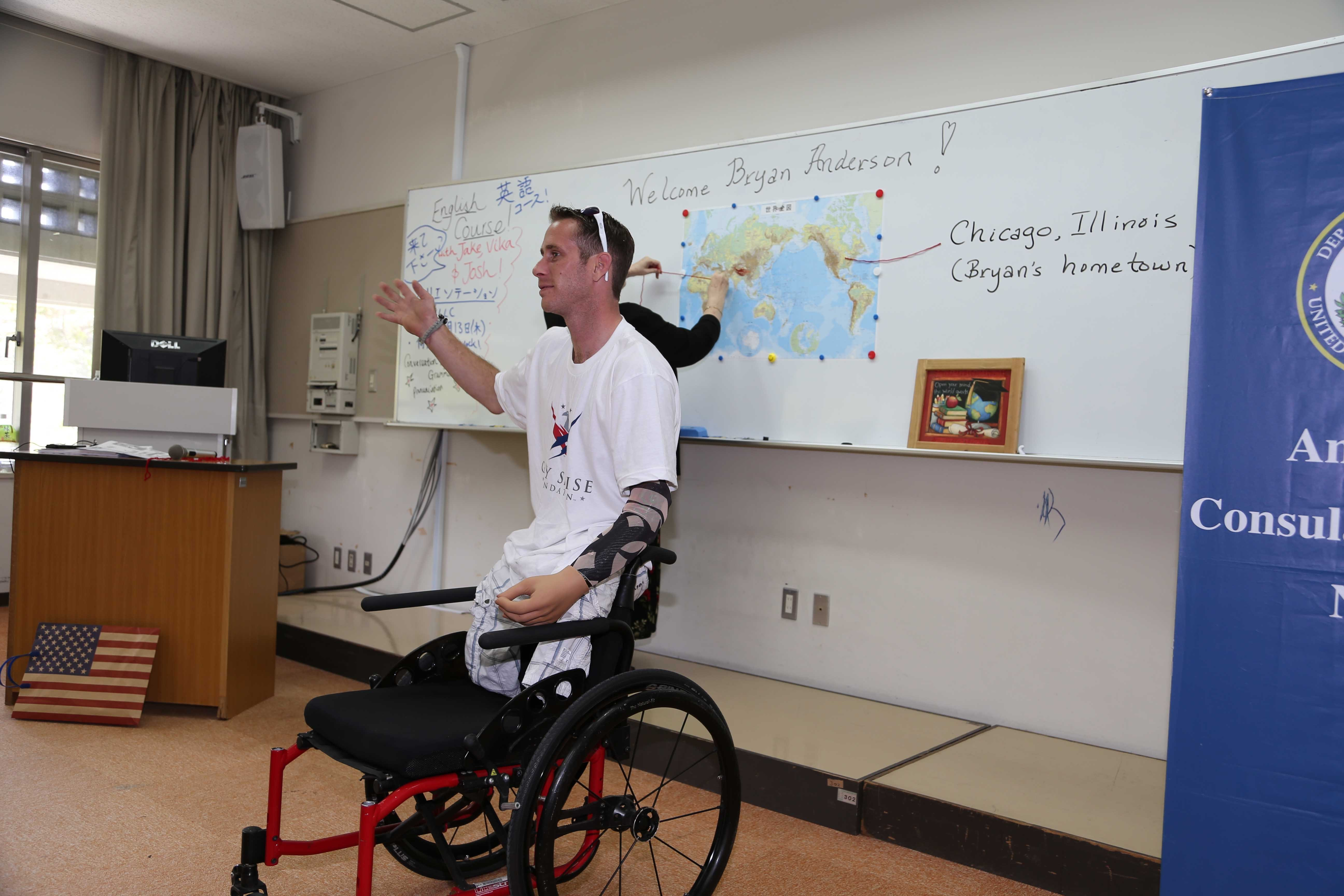
- At Meio University in Okinawa, Japan, 2013
- Born: April 9, 1981 (age 45)
- Military career
- Allegiance: United States
- Branch: Army
- Service years: 2001–2005
- Rank: Sergeant
- Unit: 411th Military Police Company
- Awards: Purple Heart
- Other work: Spokesperson, Actor, Stuntman, and Author
- Website: http://www.andersonactive.com/

Bryan Anderson (born April 9, 1981) is an American veteran of the Iraq War, triple amputee, and spokesperson. He is the author of his memoir, No Turning Back. Anderson has acted in a handful of television shows and movies, and also works as a stuntman.

== Early life ==
Anderson has an identical twin brother named Bob, and a younger sister named Briana. His parents are Jim and Janet Waswo.

Anderson was active in sports during high school. He began as a gymnast when he was a freshman, and competed in state-level competitions for the next three years. After graduating, Anderson worked for American Airlines as Ground Crew Chief at O'Hare International Airport. He also worked as a prison guard at Leavenworth Federal Penitentiary.

== Career ==
=== Military ===
Anderson enlisted in the United States Army in April 2001. His deployment date was on September 11, 2001. He served two tours of duty in Iraq. Anderson was stationed in Baghdad. Anderson earned the rank of Sergeant in the Military Police. While in Iraq, he led police training courses.

On October 23, 2005, while taking his unit commander on a routine mission to visit Iraqi police stations, Anderson's Humvee drove past an improvised explosive device (IED) in Southeast Baghdad. Anderson's Humvee was the last vehicle in the convoy. The IED would have caused fatal damage if they were traveling at 30 miles per hour, but they were traveling at only 5 miles per hour.

Anderson says he was awake for the entire ordeal. Due to the impact of the explosion, Anderson spun backwards in his seat, and lost both his legs and left hand immediately. Adding to his injuries, Anderson's right lung collapsed when the bomb hit. He tried swatting a fly from his face when he realized he no longer had his left hand. He credits his smoking habit for saving his right hand. Anderson said he usually has both hands on the steering wheel, but because he was smoking, he only had his left hand resting on the wheel. Immediately after learning about the severity of his wounds, Anderson cracked a joke to his friends. After being transported by helicopter, he lost consciousness and awoke one week later at Walter Reed Army Medical Center. Anderson said it felt more like three seconds, and was confused to wake up and see his mother staring back at him.

He endured 13 months of rehab at Walter Reed Army Hospital. At the time of the incident, Anderson had two months left in Iraq before he was to return to Fort Hood, Texas. He is the Iraq War's fourth triple amputee. He was 9 months into his second tour in Iraq, where he served as a specialist in the 411th Military Police Company.

Anderson's twin brother also serves in the Army, and his hand served as the mold for Bryan Anderson's prosthetic hand.

Anderson was awarded the Purple Heart because of his injuries.

=== After the war ===
While in recovery and learning how to walk in his prosthetic legs, Anderson tripped into Gary Sinise at Walter Reed Army Hospital. Upon meeting, Sinise called Anderson, "The real Lt. Dan!" referring to the character Sinise played in the film Forrest Gump. Sinise wrote the foreword to Anderson's memoir. The two worked together to get a bill passed in the United States Congress for a disabled veterans memorial in Washington, D.C. Anderson even played with Sinise's band, Lt. Dan Band. He is the ambassador of the Gary Sinise Foundation.

Anderson has acted in CSI: NY as a wounded Navy Seal accused of murder. He also had parts on the television shows, All My Children, The Wire, Hawaii Five-0, and most recently in the reboot of Magnum PI. Anderson was in the films, The Wrestler and American Sniper. He was featured in the HBO documentary Alive Day Memories: Home from Iraq, and worked with James Gandolfini. Aside from acting, Anderson is also a stuntman. He was a stunt driver for the film The Dark Knight, and became friends with actor Heath Ledger.

Anderson was interviewed by 60 Minutes, and featured on the cover of Esquire, The New York Times, Los Angeles Times, and USA Today.

He hosted a TV show on PBS titled, Reporting for Service with Bryan Anderson, which aired in 2013. Anderson won a regional Emmy Award for this program, which focused on community service in Chicago.

Anderson was made into a character for the Marvel Comics's Captain America series.

Anderson's memoir titled, No Turning Back: One Man's Inspiring True Story of Courage, Determination, and Hope, focuses on his experiences and lessons he's learned rather than on the incident in Iraq., David Mack is the co-writer. It was published on November 11, 2011.

He won gold medals at the National Wheelchair Games for table tennis and archery.

Anderson is the spokesperson for USA Cares, a nonprofit organization based in Radcliff, Kentucky that helps post-September 11 veterans. He is also the national spokesperson for Quantam Rehab. Anderson is a wheelchair design consultant. He is responsible for testing out the wheelchairs to make them sturdier and stronger. Anderson speaks at large rehab facilities, working to instill "perseverance and determination".

== Personal ==
Anderson lives in Rolling Meadows, Illinois. Some of his interests and hobbies include, bungee jumping, skydiving, snowboarding, rock climbing, wakeboarding, and white-water rafting.
