= Rolling Meadows, Illinois =

- City
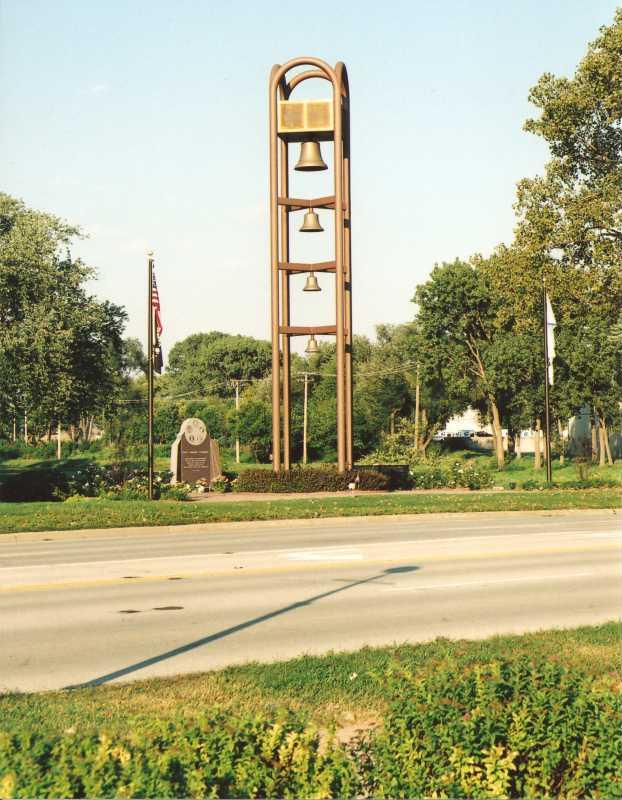
- Bell tower in Rolling Meadows

- Flag Seal Logo
- Motto: "Progress Thru Participation"
- Location of Rolling Meadows in Cook County, Illinois.

- Location within Greater Chicago Location within Illinois Location within the United States
- Coordinates: 42°4′34″N 88°1′33″W
- Country: United States
- State: Illinois
- County: Cook
- Township: Palatine, Elk Grove, Wheeling
- Incorporated: 1955

Government
  - Mayor: Lara Sanoica

Area
  - Total: 5.62 sq mi (14.56 km^{2})
  - Land: 5.61 sq mi (14.54 km^{2})
  - Water: 0.0077 sq mi (0.02 km^{2}) 0%

Population (2020)
  - Total: 24,200
  - Density: 4,309.2/sq mi (1,663.81/km^{2})

Standard of living (2009-11)
  - Per capita income: $29,099
  - Median home value: $251,900
- ZIP code(s): 60008
- Area code(s): 847 and 224
- FIPS code: 17-65338
- Website: www.cityrm.org

Rolling Meadows is a city in Cook County, Illinois, United States. It is a suburb of Chicago. Per the 2020 census, the population was 24,200.

== History ==
The first recorded land claim in the area that later became Rolling Meadows was made in 1836 by Orrin Ford, who acquired 160 acres (0.65 km²) in an area known as Plum Grove. Additional farming families, many from Vermont, settled in the area in the following years. By the early 1840s, settlers had constructed a dam across Salt Creek and occupied the broader Plum Grove area.

In 1850, the settlement became part of the newly established Palatine Township as German immigrants settled in the area. In 1862, Salem Evangelical Church was constructed, and its 40-square-foot (3.7 m²) cemetery remains at the corner of Kirchoff and Plum Grove roads.

In 1927, H. D. “Curly” Brown purchased 1,000 acres (4 km²) in the area with plans to develop a golf course and racetrack. In the early 1950s, Kimball Hill acquired the land originally intended for the golf course and began selling homes after advertising a model floor plan in the Chicago Tribune. Although the development attracted interest from prospective buyers, officials in neighboring Arlington Heights opposed the project and sought to reserve the land for estate-style housing. Following zoning approval from the Cook County Board, Hill proceeded with development.

In 1953, the first residents moved into the development, which Hill named Rolling Meadows. By 1955, approximately 700 homes had been sold, primarily to blue-collar families. Hill contributed $200 from each home sale toward the local school system and financed the construction and equipment of the community’s first elementary school. He also established the Rolling Meadows Homeowners’ Association, donated land for parks, and helped fund the Clearbrook Center, a residential and support organization for individuals with cognitive disabilities that opened in 1955.

Rolling Meadows incorporated as a city in 1955 and soon began annexing land for future development. During the 1950s and 1960s, the local economy expanded as businesses established operations in the area. Crawford’s department store opened in 1957 and became the largest department store in the northwestern suburbs before closing in 1994. An industrial park opened on North Hicks Road in 1958, and Western Electric later opened a facility that employed approximately 1,500 workers.

Residential construction also increased during this period, and by 1970, multifamily housing accounted for 35 percent of structures in the city. A series of fires in apartment complexes during the decade led Rolling Meadows to adopt stricter building regulations for multifamily construction.

By 2000, the city had begun redeveloping commercial areas along Kirchoff Road. Corporations including 3Com, Helene Curtis, and Charles Industries established operations along Golf Road in the southern portion of the city, an area that became associated with the Golden Corridor.

== Geography ==
Rolling Meadows is located 24 miles (39 km) northwest of the Chicago Loop.

According to the 2021 census gazetteer files, Rolling Meadows has a total area of 5.62 square miles (14.56 km^{2}), of which 5.62 square miles (14.56 km^{2}) (or 99.89%) is land and 0.01 square miles (0.03 km^{2}) (or 0.11%) is water.

== Demographics ==
Historical population
Census	Pop.	Note	%±
1960	10,879		—
1970	19,178		76.3%
1980	20,167		5.2%
1990	22,591		12.0%
2000	24,604		8.9%
2010	24,099		−2.1%
2020	24,200		0.4%
U.S. Decennial Census; 2010 2020

=== Racial and ethnic composition ===
Rolling Meadows city, Illinois – Racial and ethnic composition Note: the US Census treats Hispanic/Latino as an ethnic category. This table excludes Latinos from the racial categories and assigns them to a separate category. Hispanics/Latinos may be of any race.
Race / Ethnicity (NH = Non-Hispanic)	Pop 2000	Pop 2010	Pop 2020	% 2000	% 2010	% 2020
White alone (NH)	17,282	14,948	13,528	70.24%	62.03%	55.90%
Black or African American alone (NH)	662	514	637	2.69%	2.13%	2.63%
Native American or Alaska Native alone (NH)	28	8	8	0.11%	0.03%	0.03%
Asian alone (NH)	1,623	1,961	3,147	6.60%	8.14%	13.00%
Pacific Islander alone (NH)	7	6	13	0.03%	0.02%	0.05%
Other race alone (NH)	27	28	60	0.11%	0.12%	0.25%
Mixed race or Multiracial (NH)	250	300	694	1.02%	1.24%	2.87%
Hispanic or Latino (any race)	4,725	6,334	6,113	19.20%	26.28%	25.26%
Total	24,604	24,099	24,200	100.00%	100.00%	100.00%

=== 2020 census ===
As of the 2020 census, Rolling Meadows had a population of 24,200 with a population density of 4,304.52 inhabitants per square mile (1,661.98/km^{2}). There were 9,369 households and 6,013 families residing in the city.

There were 9,780 housing units at an average density of 1,739.59 per square mile (671.66/km^{2}), of which 4.2% were vacant. The homeowner vacancy rate was 1.4% and the rental vacancy rate was 6.7%.

The median age was 40.1 years. 20.7% of residents were under the age of 18 and 15.9% of residents were 65 years of age or older. For every 100 females there were 98.0 males, and for every 100 females age 18 and over there were 96.8 males age 18 and over.

Of the households, 30.5% had children under the age of 18 living in them. 50.1% were married-couple households, 19.0% were households with a male householder and no spouse or partner present, and 24.9% were households with a female householder and no spouse or partner present. About 27.4% of all households were made up of individuals and 11.4% had someone living alone who was 65 years of age or older.

100.0% of residents lived in urban areas, while 0.0% lived in rural areas.

Racial composition as of the 2020 census
Race	Number	Percent
White	14,395	59.5%
Black or African American	677	2.8%
American Indian and Alaska Native	310	1.3%
Asian	3,163	13.1%
Native Hawaiian and Other Pacific Islander	17	0.1%
Some other race	3,070	12.7%
Two or more races	2,568	10.6%
Hispanic or Latino (of any race)	6,113	25.3%

== Economy ==
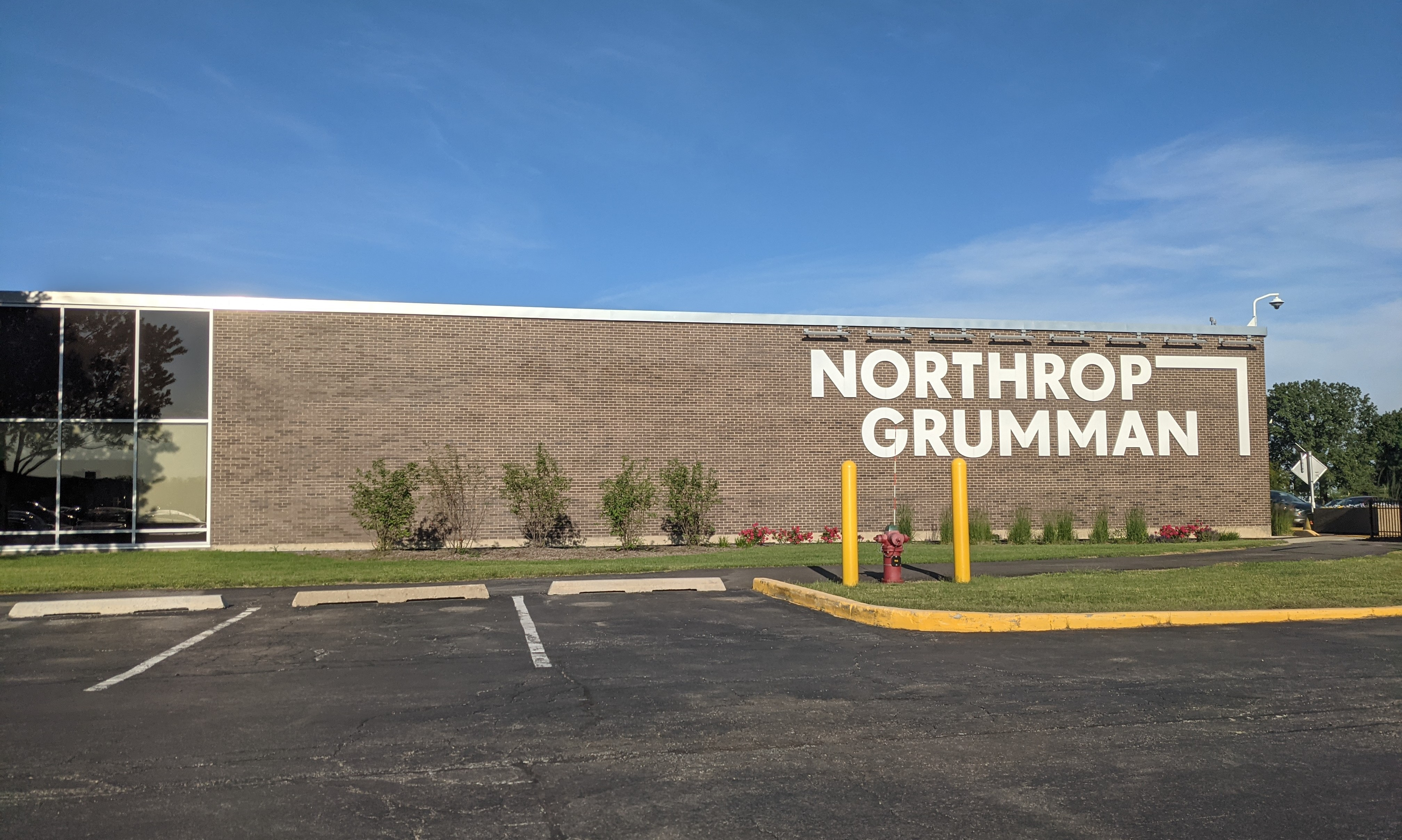
Northrop Grumman is the largest employer in Rolling Meadows.

The Chicago-area office of Huawei is located at 3601 Algonquin Road. The Chicago-area sales office of Asiana Airlines is located at Suite 1010 of Continental Towers # 3.

According to the city's 2018 Comprehensive Annual Financial Report, the top employers in the city are:

#	Employer	# of employees
1	Northrop Defense Systems	2,450
2	Arthur J Gallagher	2,000
3	Verizon Wireless	900
4	Capital One	800
5	CareerBuilder Employment Screening	450
6	Komatsu	300
7	A.H. Management Group	300
8	RTC	235
9	Meijer	230
10	Walmart	200

== Parks and recreation ==
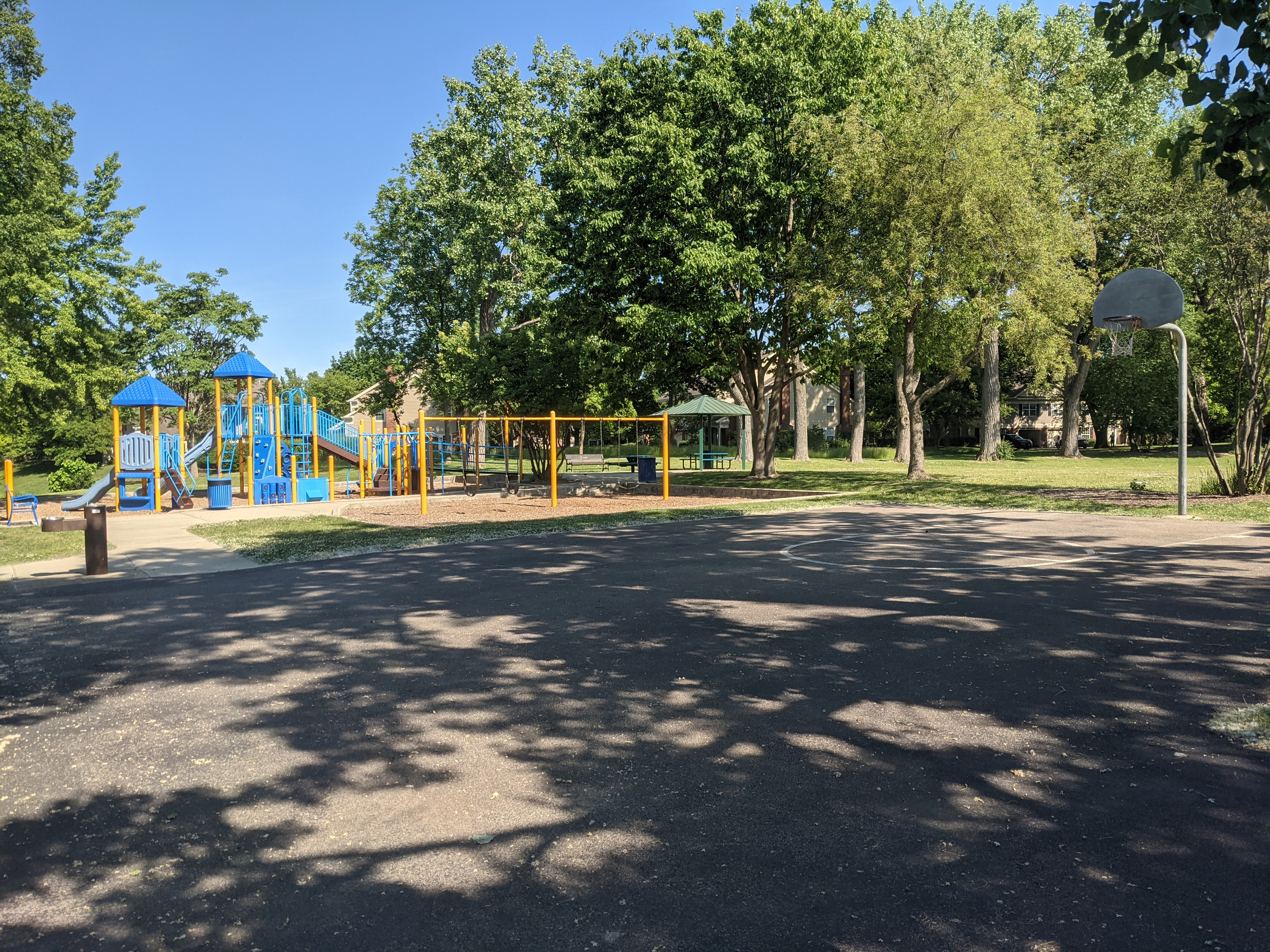
Cottonwood Park, managed by the Palatine Park District, is located in Rolling Meadows.

The Rolling Meadows Park District was formed in 1958, and has been a finalist for the National Gold Medal award for excellence in parks and recreation management four times.

The Salt Creek Rural Park District was formed in 1956, and provides recreation and leisure services to the residents that live within the corporate boundaries of the district, which include parts of the villages of Arlington Heights and Palatine, and the city of Rolling Meadows. The district also provides recreation and leisure services to non-residents of the area on a fee basis.

== Education ==
=== Primary and secondary schools ===
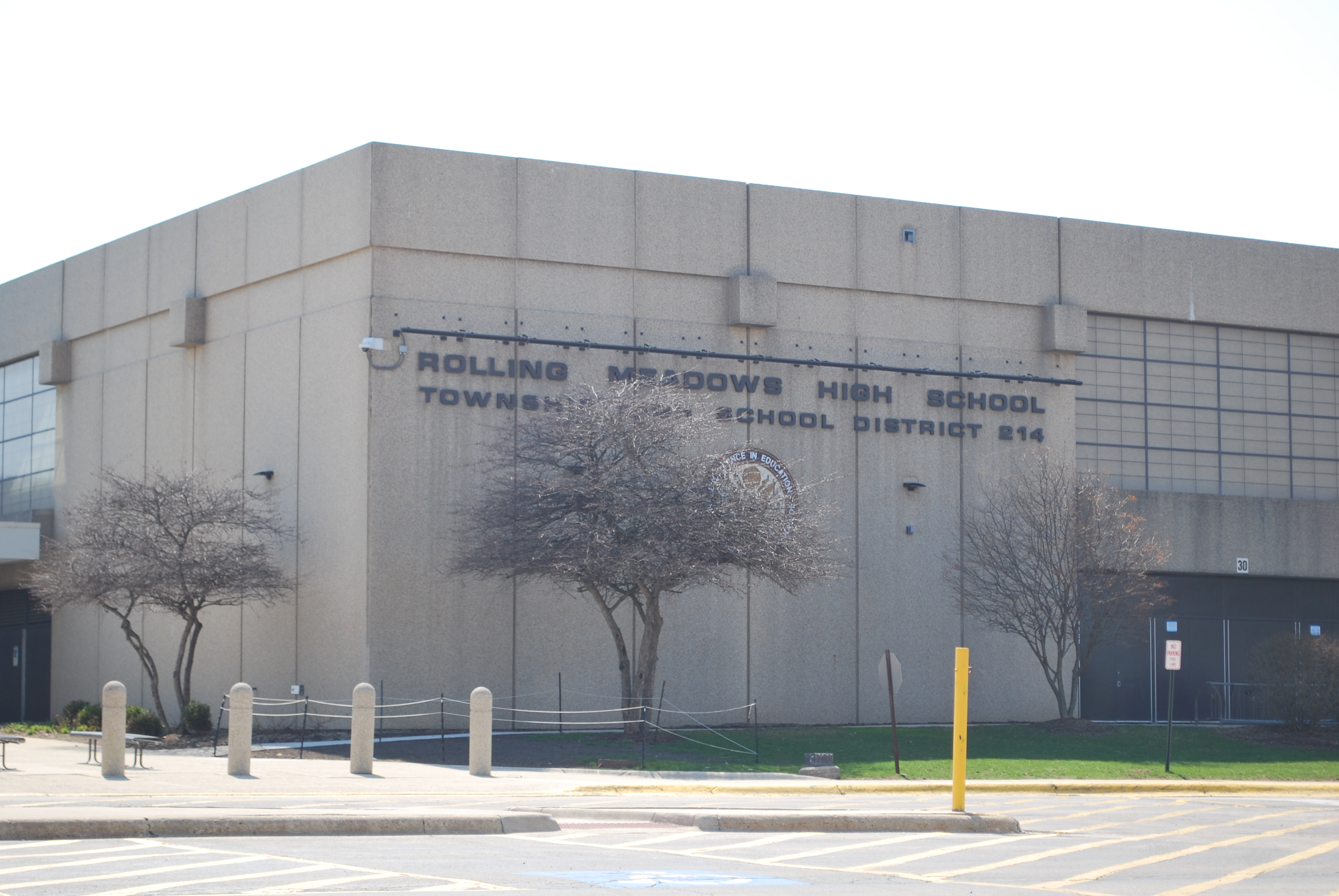
Rolling Meadows High School

Almost all of Rolling Meadows is served by Palatine Community Consolidated School District 15. District 15 schools in Rolling Meadows include Central Road (K–5), Kimball Hill (K–5), Willow Bend (K–5), John G. Conyers Learning Academy (early childhood and multiple needs). In addition, Carl Sandburg (6–8) takes students from Kimball Hill and Willow Bend for middle school. Additionally, Plum Grove (6–8) takes students from Central Road, in addition to Stuart R. Paddock (K–5), Pleasant Hill (K–5), and Hunting Ridge (K–5) all of which are located in Palatine.

A very small portion is served by Arlington Heights School District 25, which includes Westgate Elementary School and South Middle School, where students then attend RMHS. Another smaller portion is served by Schaumburg Consolidated School District 54 and Adlai Stevenson Elementary School in Elk Grove Village, Margaret Mead Junior High School and WFHS, and a small portion extends into Community Consolidated School District 59; that portion has no residents.

About half of Rolling Meadows is served by Township High School District 214's Rolling Meadows High School. The other half is served by Township High School District 211 by William Fremd High School in Palatine.

The Roman Catholic Archdiocese of Chicago operates Catholic schools. St. Colette School is a pre-K–8 Catholic school serving all of Rolling Meadows. St. Colette School was awarded as a 2007 Blue Ribbon School from the U.S. Department of Education. The student population from circa 2017 to 2020 declined by 97 people. In 2020 its budget deficit was $500,000. Therefore, the archdiocese decided to close the school after Spring 2020.

== Transportation ==
Pace provides bus service on multiple routes connecting Rolling Meadows to Des Plaines, Schaumburg, and other destinations.

== Notable people ==
- Bryan Anderson, Iraqi War veteran and author
- Jay Bennett, guitarist with band Wilco
- Gary Cole, film and television actor
- Jimmy Garoppolo, NFL quarterback with New England Patriots, San Francisco 49ers, Las Vegas Raiders
- Carol Marin, television and print journalist
- Tim McIlrath, lead singer to punk rock band Rise Against; lived in Arlington Heights
- Scott Tolzien, NFL quarterback with Indianapolis Colts, Green Bay Packers
