= Palatine, Illinois =

- Village
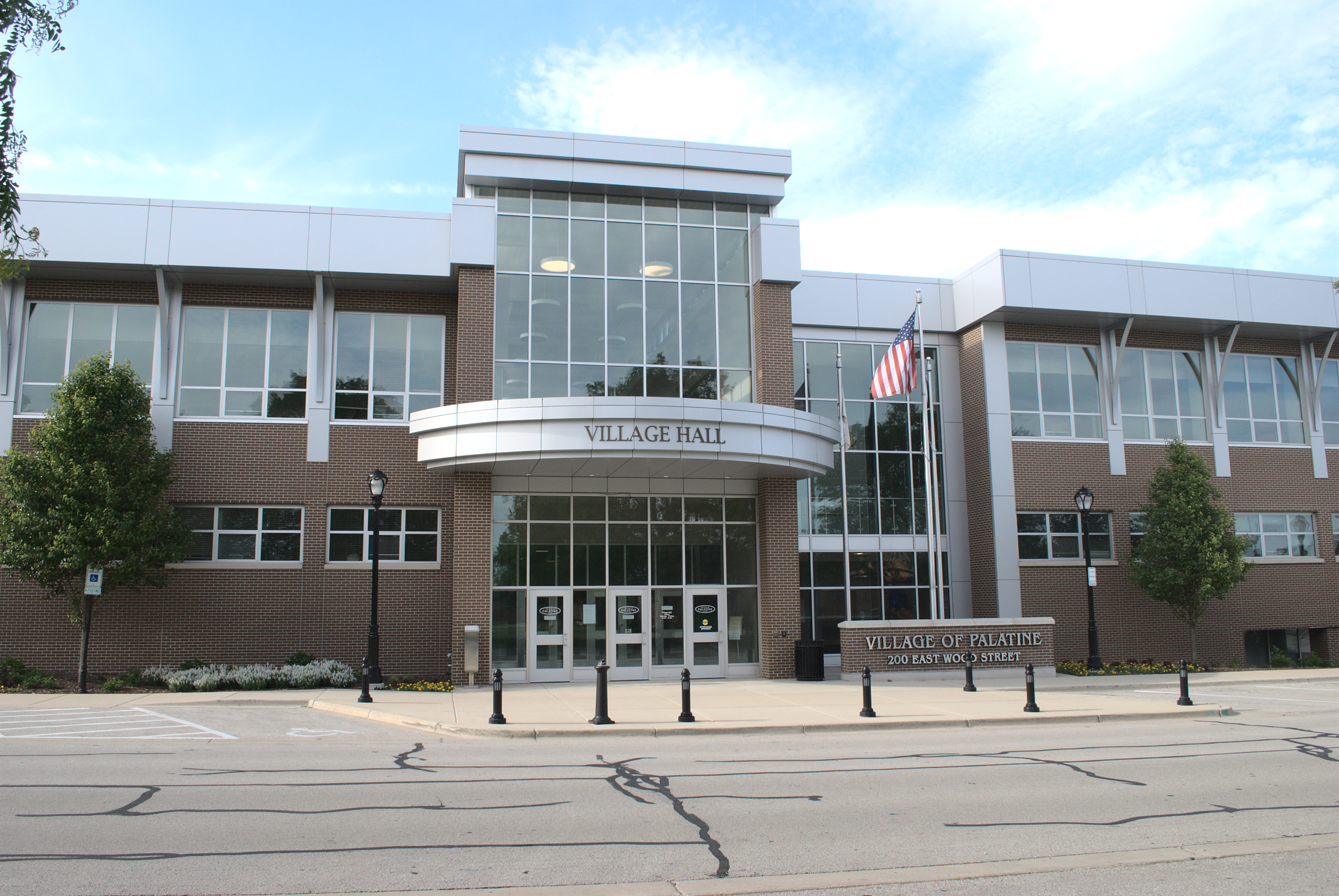
- Palatine Village Hall

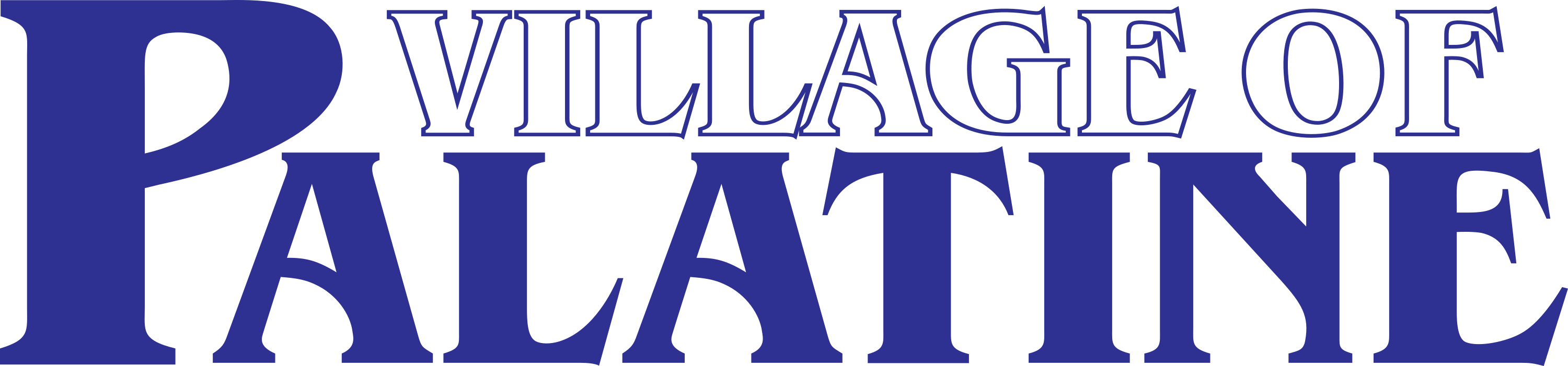
- Logo
- Motto: A Real Home Town
- Interactive map of Palatine, Illinois
- Location within Greater Chicago Location within Illinois Location within the United States
- Coordinates: 42°07′41″N 88°02′32″W
- Country: United States
- State: Illinois
- County: Cook, Lake
- Township: Palatine, Ela

Government
  - Mayor: Jim Schwantz

Area
  - Total: 14.28 sq mi (36.98 km^{2})
  - Land: 14.12 sq mi (36.56 km^{2})
  - Water: 0.16 sq mi (0.42 km^{2})
- Elevation: 741 ft (226 m)

Population (2020)
  - Total: 67,908
  - Estimate (2024): 65,951 ▼
  - Density: 4,811.4/sq mi (1,857.69/km^{2})
- Demonym: Palatinian
- Time zone: UTC−6 (CST)
  - Summer (DST): UTC−5 (CDT)
- ZIP codes: 60067, 60074, 60078, 60094, 60095, 60173, 60195
- Area codes: 847, 224
- FIPS code: 17-57225
- GNIS feature ID: 2399608
- Home value: $254,600 (2013)
- Website: www.palatine.il.us

Palatine (/ˈpælətaɪn/) is a village in Cook and Lake counties, Illinois, United States. It is a predominantly residential suburb within the northwestern Chicago metropolitan area. The population was 67,908 at the 2020 census.

== History ==
The first European-American to settle in Palatine is generally thought to be George Ela, who built a log cabin in the area later called Deer Grove. Ela was one of the first of a wave of pioneers to migrate to northern Illinois following the Black Hawk War. A road that passes through the western edge of Palatine is called Ela Road in his honor. Palatine is thought to be named after a town in New York.

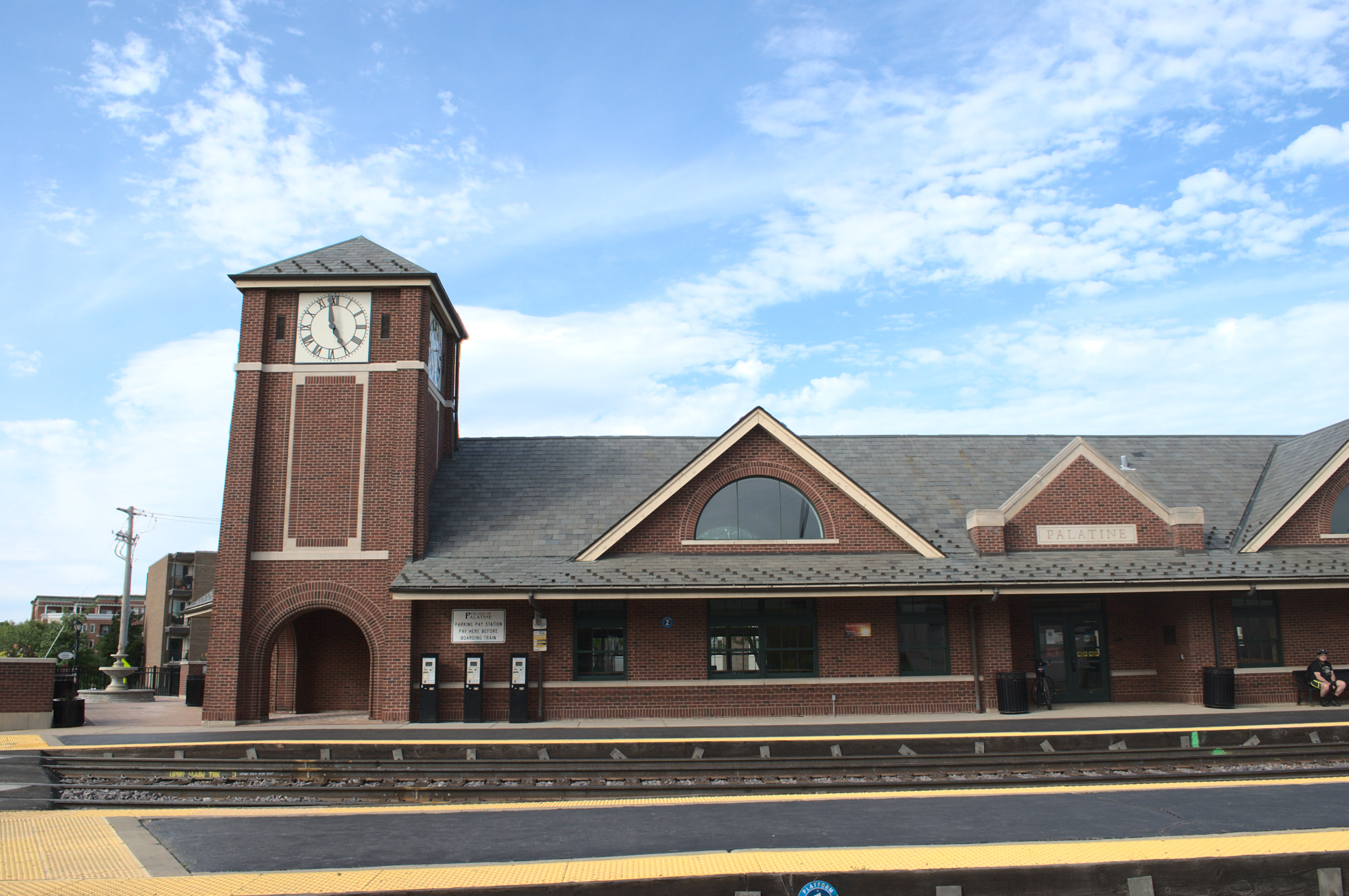
The Palatine Metra station along the Union Pacific Northwest Line

The Village of Palatine was founded in 1866. It was built around a station on the new Chicago and North Western Railway. Joel Wood surveyed and laid out the village, earning him the title of Palatine's founder. One of Palatine's original downtown streets is named after Wood.

In 1920, the Indian Fellowship League held its first American Indian Day celebration at Camp Reinberg, in Palatine. According to the Daily Herald, the festivities were attended by 60,000 people, which packed the highways leading to the camp with motorists.

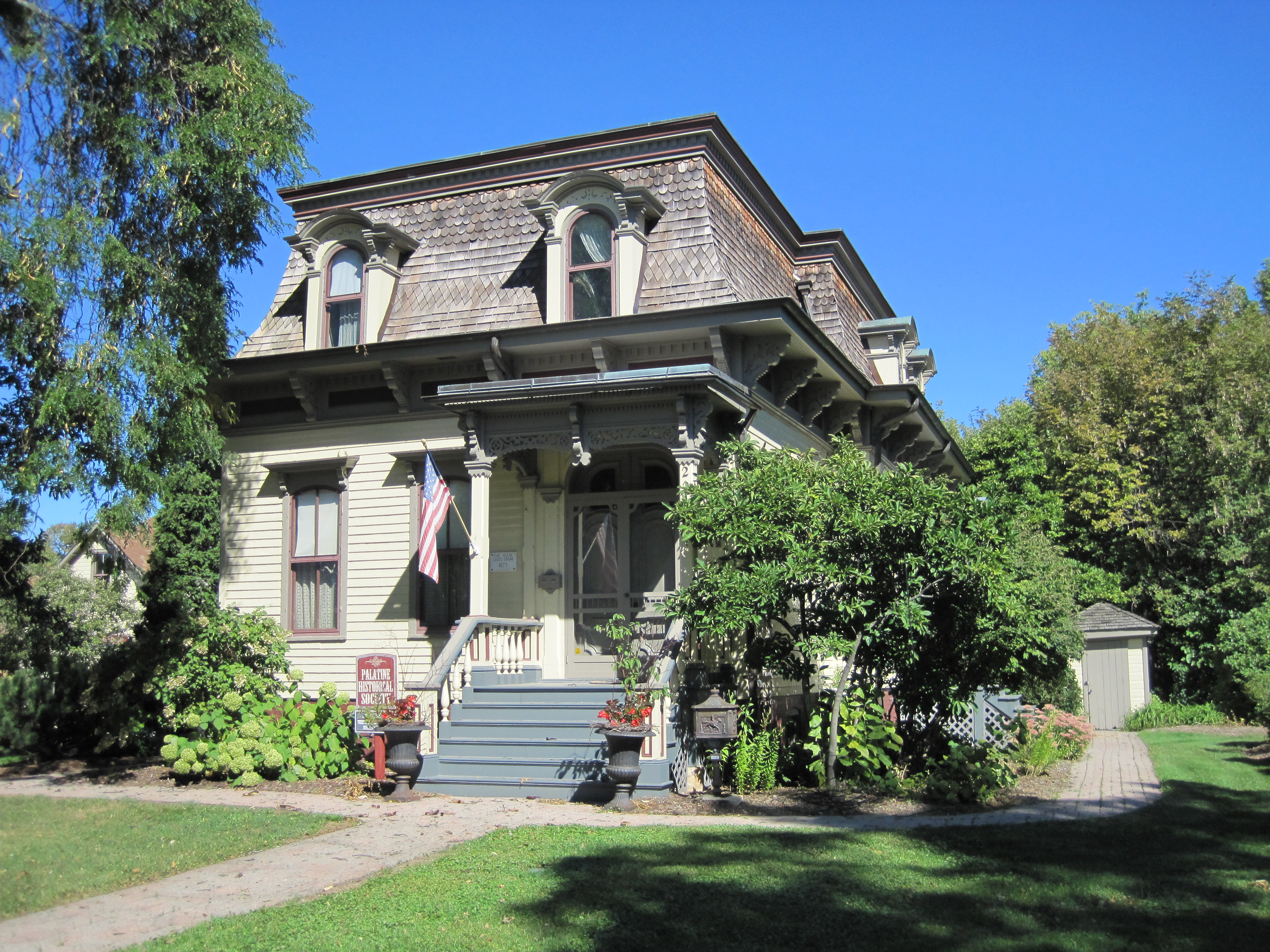
Palatine's historic George Clayson House was built in 1873.

A shortline railroad, the Palatine, Lake Zurich and Wauconda Railroad, was built in 1911, and began full passenger service to Wauconda, Illinois, in 1912. The line was closed in 1924 after a series of financial misfortunes and the improvement of roads in the area. The PLZ&W provided transportation to Dr. Wilson's Deer Grove Park, just north of Dundee Road in Palatine.

Palatine's first suburb-style subdivision was called Palanois Park, with most houses built shortly after World War II and at least three houses dating to the 1930s. The town has experienced rapid growth since the 1970s, part of Chicago's growing suburban sprawl. Palatine was home to the Cook County Fair from 1914 to 1931. The fairgrounds are now a subdivision, Fairgrounds Park, whose name pays tribute to Palatine's former fairgrounds.

During the early 1990s, Palatine along with neighboring Rolling Meadows and far northern suburb Zion were sued by atheist activist Rob Sherman over its village seal and seal-defaced flag, which had a Christian cross, among other things, inside an outline of an eagle. A 1992 advisory referendum to keep the seal passed, but another referendum to use public funds to defend the seal failed, leading the village to drop the seal. While Rolling Meadows and Zion developed new seals with the crosses removed, Palatine has since been without an official seal or flag, and is Illinois' largest city or village to be so. The French tricolor reflecting the village's sister city relationship with Fontenay-le-Comte, France, has flown at times on the flagpole meant for the village flag outside the village hall.

In 1993, a multiple homicide, the Brown's Chicken massacre, received national attention.

Palatine has been in the process of revitalizing its downtown area since December 1999. This process has spawned a new passenger train station, a nearby parking garage, and several new condominiums, rowhouses, and commercial buildings.

In 2008, Palatine made news by threatening to secede from Cook County over the latter's sales tax hike; as a result of the tax hike, Palatine's sales tax is 9.0%. In 2009, residents of Palatine Township (which includes the village of Palatine) overwhelmingly voted to pass an advisory referendum stating that they would like to secede from Cook County.

== Geography ==
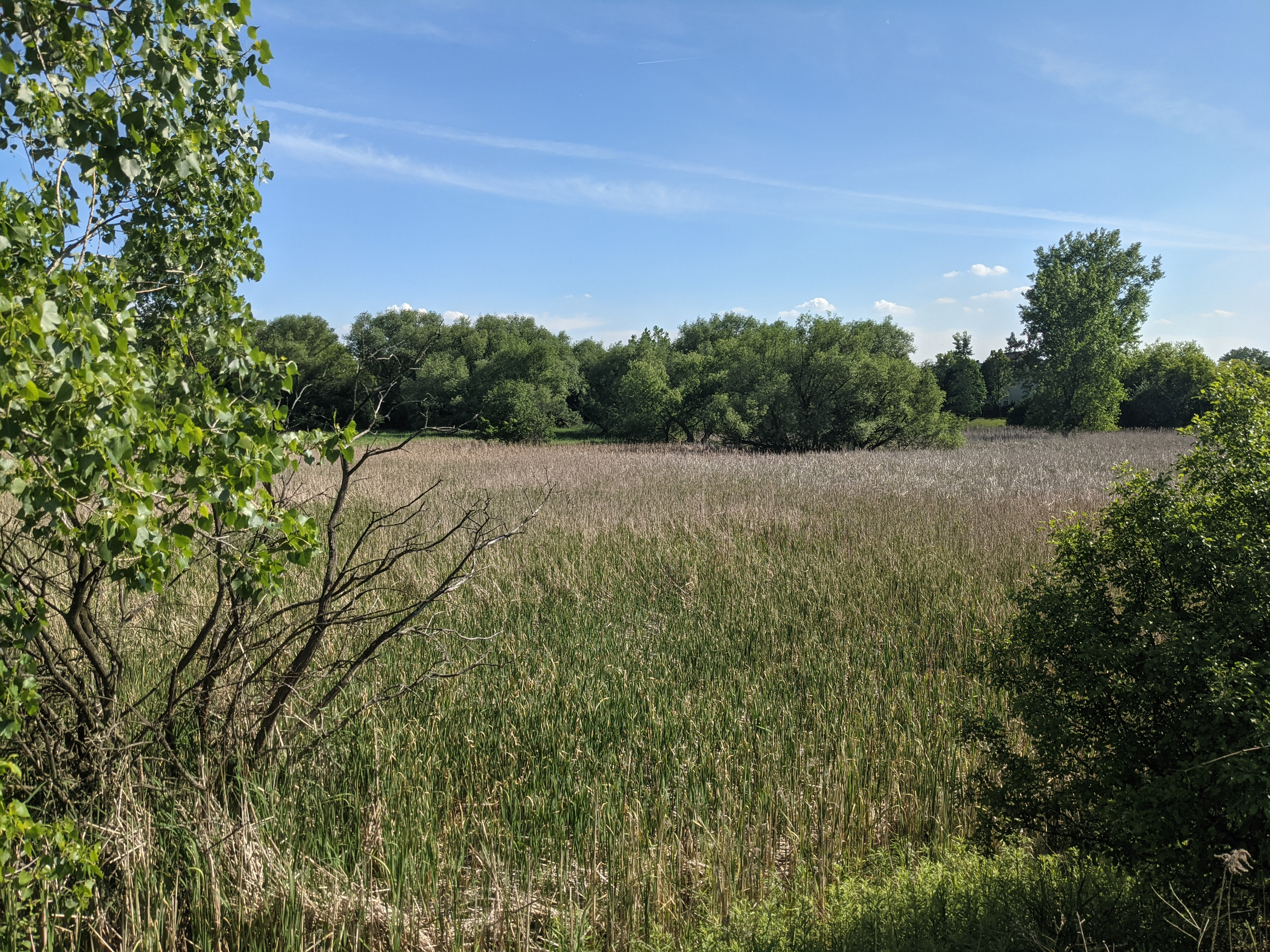
Undeveloped wooded marshland near Euclid Avenue in southern Palatine

Palatine has a total area of 14.28 square miles (36.99 km^{2}), of which 14.11 square miles (36.54 km^{2}) (or 98.87%) is land and 0.16 square miles (0.41 km^{2}) (or 1.13%) is water. Located primarily in Cook County, a portion extends into neighboring Lake County.

Palatine is in a wooded marshland where several streams rise around the village. Most of these streams meet up with Salt Creek which rises at Wilke Marsh on the village's east side. The most notable exception is the northeast side, where its streams lie in the Buffalo Creek watershed. A small part of the east and southeast sides lies in the McDonald Creek watershed.

=== Climate ===
Palatine is in the Hot-summer humid continental climate, or Köppen Dfa zone. The zone includes four distinct seasons. Winter is cold with snow. Spring warms up with precipitation and storms, which can include thunderstorms and tornadoes. Summer has high precipitation and storms. Fall cools down.

Climate data for Palatine, IL Climate normals based on Palatine(rain)/SW Barrington(temps) (1990-2020))
Month	Jan	Feb	Mar	Apr	May	Jun	Jul	Aug	Sep	Oct	Nov	Dec	Year
Mean daily maximum °F (°C)	28.7 (−1.8)	32.8 (0.4)	44.5 (6.9)	57.5 (14.2)	68.5 (20.3)	77.5 (25.3)	81.3 (27.4)	79.2 (26.2)	72.4 (22.4)	60.1 (15.6)	46.3 (7.9)	34.2 (1.2)	56.9 (13.8)
Daily mean °F (°C)	21.1 (−6.1)	24.6 (−4.1)	35.5 (1.9)	47.3 (8.5)	58.4 (14.7)	67.8 (19.9)	72.0 (22.2)	70.2 (21.2)	63.0 (17.2)	50.8 (10.4)	38.2 (3.4)	27.0 (−2.8)	48.0 (8.9)
Mean daily minimum °F (°C)	13.4 (−10.3)	16.4 (−8.7)	26.5 (−3.1)	37.2 (2.9)	48.3 (9.1)	58.1 (14.5)	62.6 (17.0)	61.2 (16.2)	53.6 (12.0)	41.5 (5.3)	30.2 (−1.0)	19.7 (−6.8)	39.1 (3.9)
Average precipitation inches (mm)	2.05 (52)	1.92 (49)	2.24 (57)	3.49 (89)	4.63 (118)	4.68 (119)	3.77 (96)	4.15 (105)	3.34 (85)	3.39 (86)	2.05 (52)	1.87 (47)	37.58 (955)
Average snowfall inches (cm)	12.6 (32)	8.5 (22)	4.6 (12)	1.1 (2.8)	0.0 (0.0)	0.0 (0.0)	0.0 (0.0)	0.0 (0.0)	0.0 (0.0)	0.1 (0.25)	2.0 (5.1)	9.6 (24)	38.5 (98.15)
Source: NOAA

== Demographics ==
Historical population
Census	Pop.	Note	%±
1880	731		—
1890	891		21.9%
1900	1,020		14.5%
1910	1,144		12.2%
1920	1,210		5.8%
1930	2,118		75.0%
1940	2,222		4.9%
1950	4,079		83.6%
1960	11,504		182.0%
1970	26,050		126.4%
1980	32,166		23.5%
1990	39,253		22.0%
2000	65,479		66.8%
2010	68,557		4.7%
2020	67,908		−0.9%
U.S. Decennial Census; 2010 2020

=== Racial and ethnic composition ===
Palatine village, Illinois – Racial and ethnic composition Note: the US Census treats Hispanic/Latino as an ethnic category. This table excludes Latinos from the racial categories and assigns them to a separate category. Hispanics/Latinos may be of any race.
Race / Ethnicity (NH = Non-Hispanic)	Pop 2000	Pop 2010	Pop 2020	% 2000	% 2010	% 2020
White alone (NH)	49,029	46,246	41,673	74.88%	67.46%	61.37%
Black or African American alone (NH)	1,343	1,798	2,024	2.05%	2.62%	2.98%
Native American or Alaska Native alone (NH)	68	61	58	0.10%	0.09%	0.09%
Asian alone (NH)	4,928	7,043	8,754	7.53%	10.27%	12.89%
Native Hawaiian or Pacific Islander alone (NH)	22	19	14	0.03%	0.03%	0.02%
Other race alone (NH)	55	109	217	0.08%	0.16%	0.32%
Mixed race or Multiracial (NH)	787	934	1,863	1.20%	1.36%	2.74%
Hispanic or Latino (any race)	9,247	12,347	13,305	14.12%	18.01%	19.59%
Total	65,479	68,557	67,908	100.00%	100.00%	100.00%

=== 2020 census ===
As of the 2020 census, Palatine had a population of 67,908. The median age was 39.9 years. 20.8% of residents were under the age of 18 and 15.4% of residents were 65 years of age or older. For every 100 females there were 96.7 males, and for every 100 females age 18 and over there were 94.7 males age 18 and over.

100.0% of residents lived in urban areas, while 0.0% lived in rural areas.

There were 27,626 households in Palatine, of which 28.5% had children under the age of 18 living in them. Of all households, 49.9% were married-couple households, 18.1% were households with a male householder and no spouse or partner present, and 25.6% were households with a female householder and no spouse or partner present. About 29.2% of all households were made up of individuals and 10.5% had someone living alone who was 65 years of age or older.

There were 29,058 housing units, of which 4.9% were vacant. The homeowner vacancy rate was 1.3% and the rental vacancy rate was 7.5%.

=== Demographic estimates ===
According to 2020 ACS 5-year estimates, Palatine had 17,120 families, an average household size of 3.15, and an average family size of 2.52. The ACS age distribution was 6.3% from 18 to 24, 28.9% from 25 to 44, and 26.9% from 45 to 64.

=== Income and poverty ===
The median income for a household in the village was $83,495, and the median income for a family was $108,166. Males had a median income of $55,157 versus $39,378 for females. The per capita income for the village was $43,978. About 7.2% of families and 9.9% of the population were below the poverty line, including 18.7% of those under age 18 and 3.8% of those age 65 or over.

=== Religion ===
The village is home to a large Sikh gurdwara, the Sikh Religious Society, on its northwest side that is visited by Sikhs from across the country.

== Economy ==
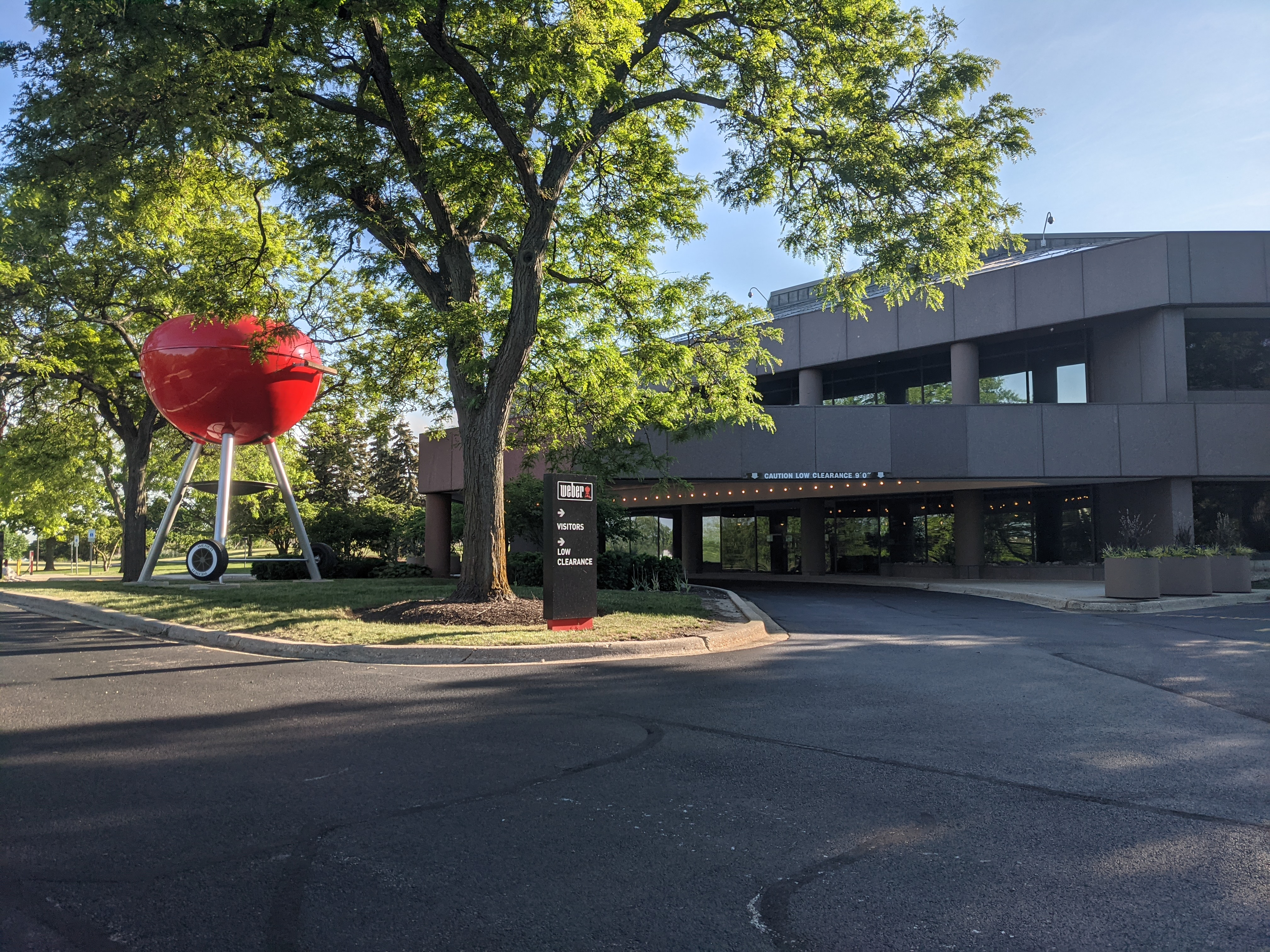
Weber-Stephen Products' headquarters in Palatine

Weber-Stephen Products, manufacturer of the Weber grill, is headquartered in Palatine.

=== Top employers ===
According to Palatine's 2020 Comprehensive Annual Financial Report, the top employers in the city are:

#	Employer	# of Employees
1	Community Consolidated School District 15	2,444
2	Township High School District 211	2,055
3	United States Postal Service	1,900
4	Community College District 512	840
5	Little City Foundation	735
6	Weber-Stephen Products	400
7	Village of Palatine	346
8	Intec Group, Inc.	175
8	Arlington Plating	175
10	United Parcel Service	155

=== Local business ===
Palatine has a reputable local business community. The Palatine Area Chamber of Commerce is also very active with around 100 members as of 2025. The chamber hosts several weekly, monthly, and annual events attended by local and non-local business leaders.

The chamber also hosts a weekly networking group named ExecNet that is popular among local businesses. The weekly meeting is attended by the mayor, local business leaders, and non-profit representatives. Many members praise the group's ability to bring referrals for its members.

== Arts and culture ==
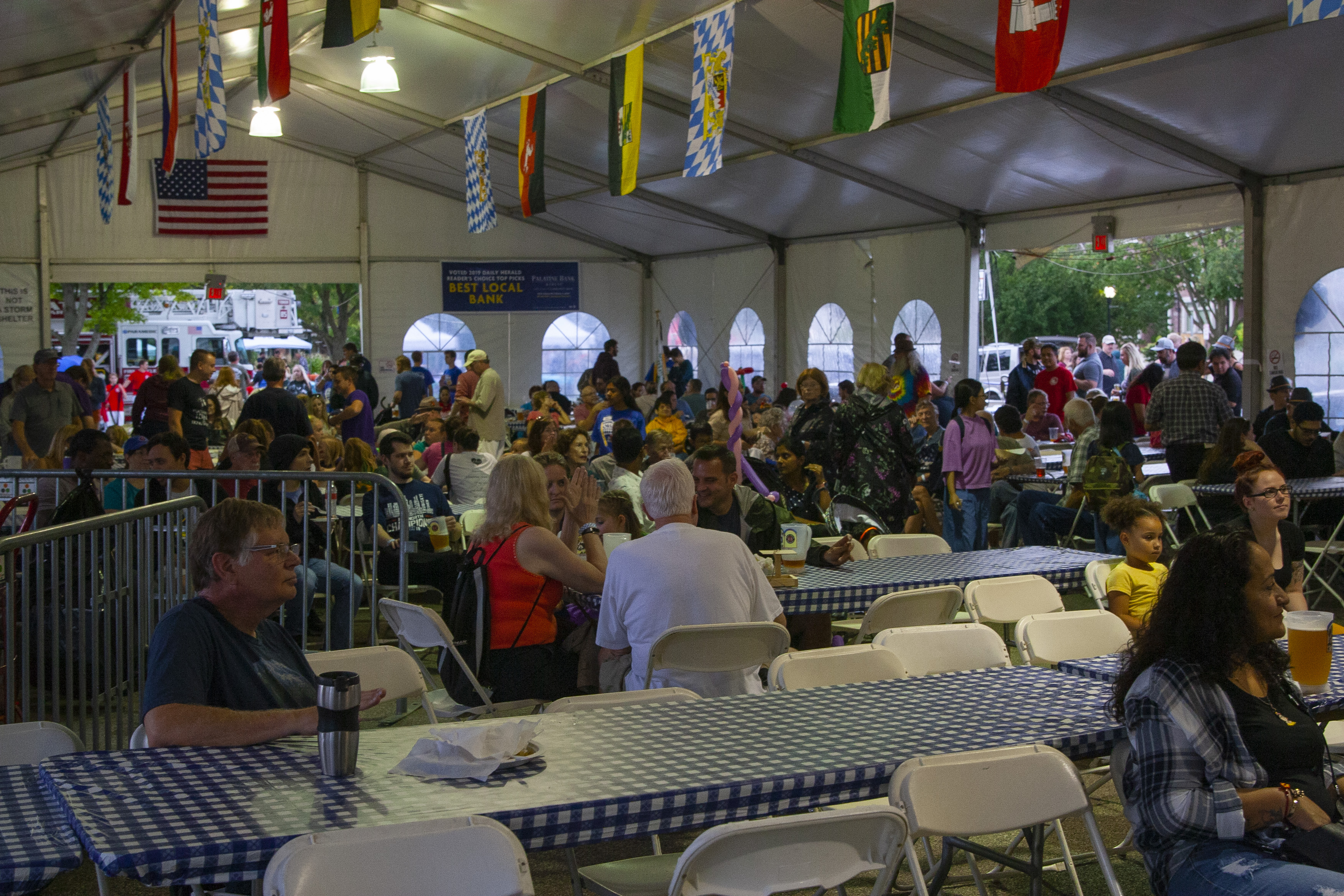
2019 Oktoberfest celebration

- Streetfest: Similar to Taste of Chicago, this event includes lines of food vendors down the streets of downtown Palatine, with music playing and games and other fun activities going on at the same time. This happens at the end of every summer (August) every year and is meant for families and friends to enjoy.
- Fourth of July Celebration: Another tradition of Palatine is the schedule of Fourth of July events that occur every year. From an annual parade, to fireworks which traditionally occur on the third of July, to the carnival that comes into town, Palatine is full of the traditional celebration of every Fourth of July holiday. Events are for members of all ages, and are things that occur every year.
- Oktoberfest A newer tradition, this celebration started in 2008 and is hosted by the Rotary Club of Palatine. Live German music, craft and imported beer, and local food vendors celebrate Palatine's German roots. This is an all-ages celebration, but Family Day on Saturday morning has activities geared toward younger folks. The event begins Friday night on the third weekend in September.

== Parks and recreation ==
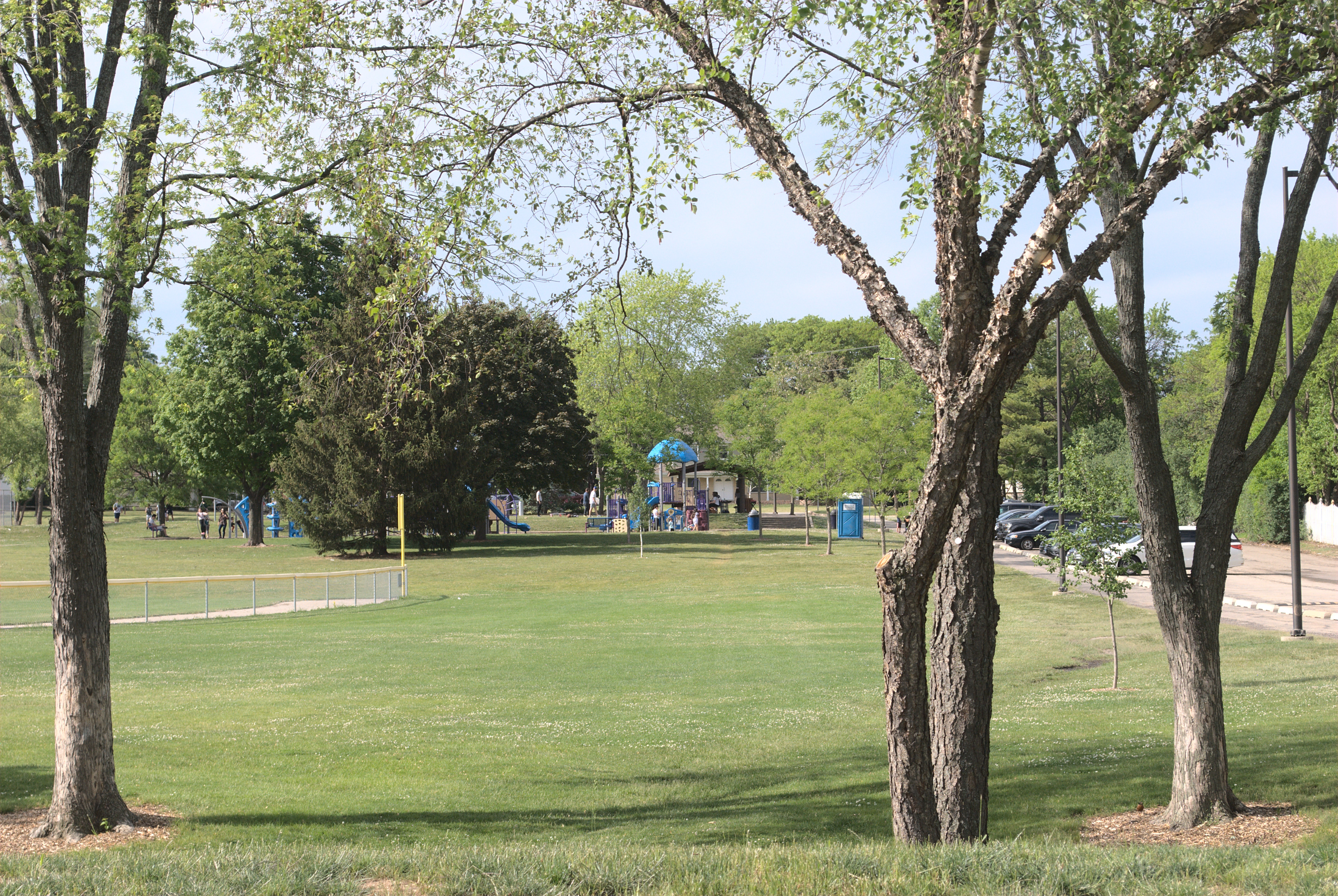
Birchwood Park

The Palatine Park District serves 85,000 residents within the Palatine, Rolling Meadows, Arlington Heights, Inverness, Hoffman Estates and Barrington communities. It is governed by five elected park commissioners who oversee a professional staff.

The Palatine Park District operates swimming pools at Family Aquatic Center, Birchwood Park, and Eagle Pool, as well as recreational centers at its Community Center, Birchwood, and Falcon Park – which opened in January 2010. The district purchased Palatine Stables in 1989, and the facility was home to approximately 70 horses before its closing in November 2024.

== Government ==
Palatine operates under the Council–manager form of local government. Six councilmen are elected from their respective districts, while the entire village elects the Village Clerk and the Mayor. The council then hires a Village Manager to oversee the town's day-to-day operation. The current mayor is Jim Schwantz.

== Education ==
=== Public schools ===
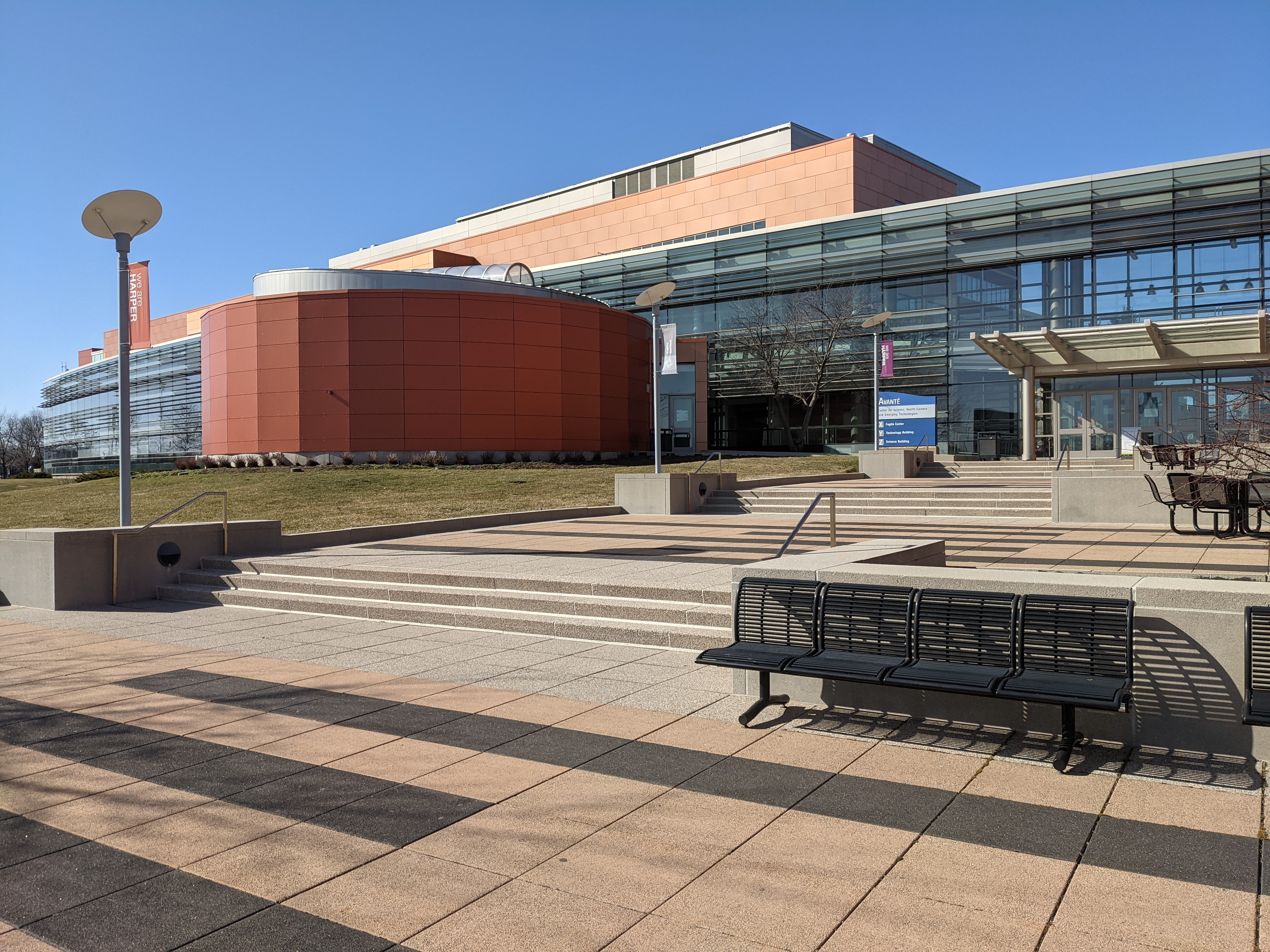
Harper College

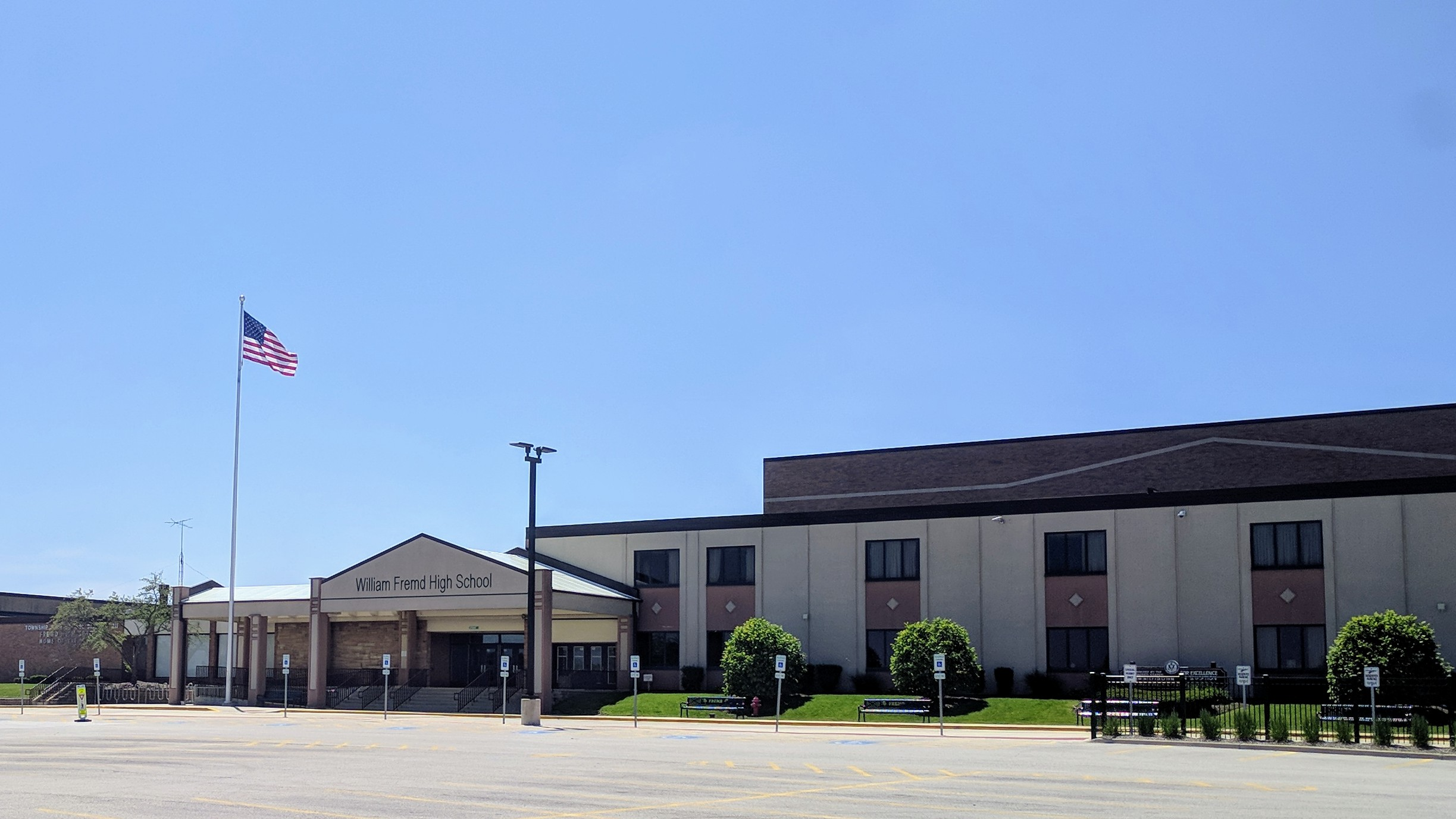
William Fremd High School

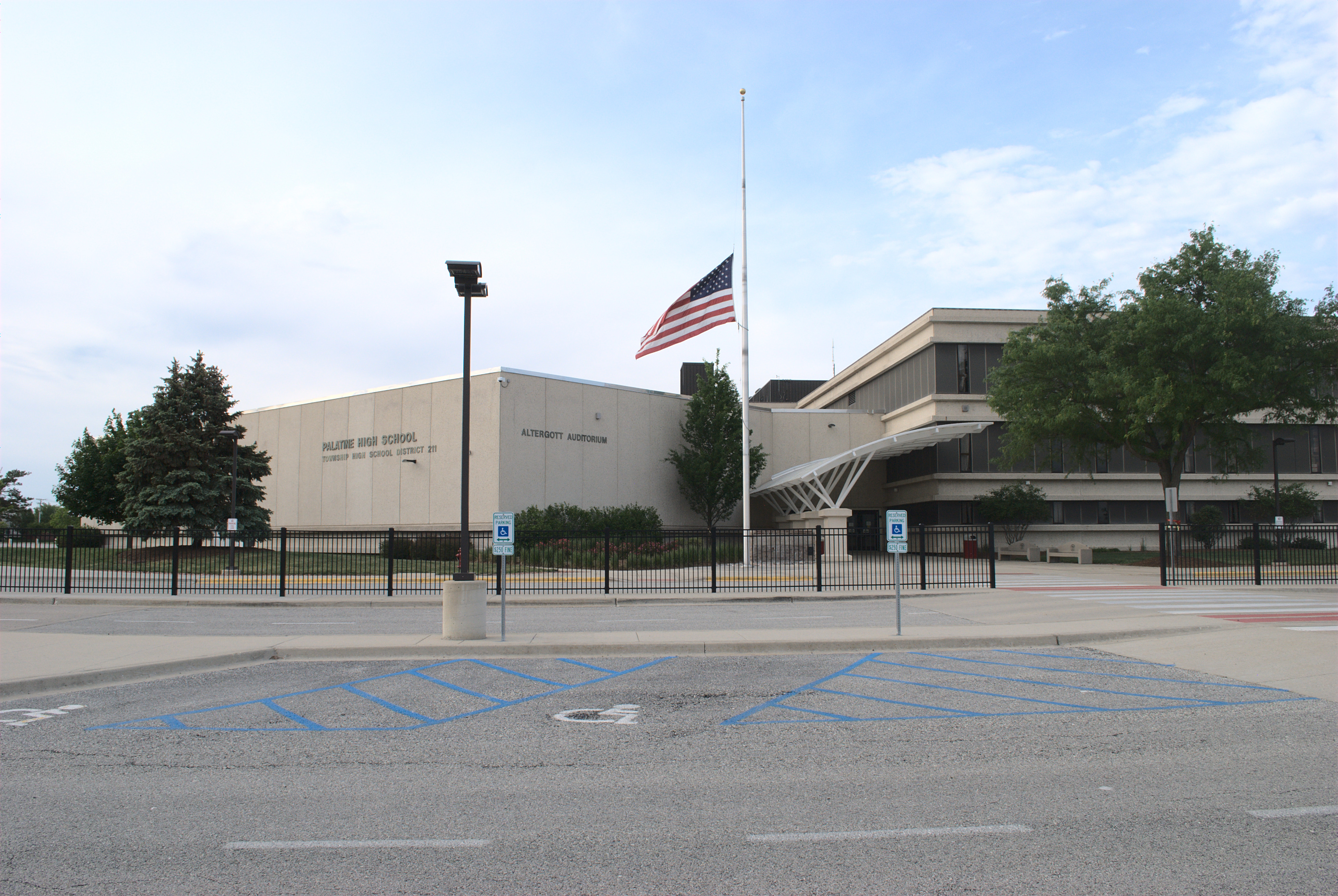
Palatine High School

Palatine is part of Community Consolidated School District 15 for public elementary schools and Township High School District 211 for public high schools. Schools located in Palatine include:

- Gray M. Sanborn Elementary School
- Hunting Ridge Elementary School
- Jane Addams Elementary School
- Lake Louise Elementary School
- Lincoln Elementary School
- Marion Jordan Elementary School
- Pleasant Hill Elementary School
- Willow Bend Elementary School
- Central Road Elementary School
- Frank C. Whiteley Elementary School
- Stuart R. Paddock Elementary School
- Virginia Lake Elementary School
- Walter R. Sundling Middle School
- Winston Campus Middle School
- Palatine High School
- William Fremd High School
- District 211 Academy-North

=== Private schools ===
- Saint Theresa (Catholic) (Preschool–8)
- Saint Thomas of Villanova (Catholic) (Preschool–8)
- Immanuel Lutheran (Lutheran) (Preschool–8)

=== Independent schools ===
- Quest Academy (Preschool–8)
- Acton Academy (K–12)
- The Chicago Northwest Suburban Chinese School holds its classes at William Fremd High School. The school serves students in grades preschool through 10.

=== College ===
- William Rainey Harper College

== Transportation ==
The Palatine station provides Metra commuter rail service along the Union Pacific Northwest Line. Trains travel southeast to Ogilvie Transportation Center in Chicago, and northwest to Harvard station or McHenry station.

Pace provides bus service on Routes 604 and 697 connecting Palatine to the Northwest Transportation Center in Schaumburg, and other destinations.

== Notable people ==
- Michael Bradley, midfielder with the US National Team and Toronto FC; lived in Palatine
- Charlie Bullen, American football coach born in Palatine. Current interim defensive coordinator for the New York Giants of the National Football League.
- Perry Caravello, actor and comedian, lived in Palatine as a child
- Charles Dickinson (born 1951), novelist and short story writer; settled in Palatine
- J. Michael Durnil – president of the Simon Youth Foundation
- Mauro Fiore, Academy Award-winning cinematographer; attended Palatine High School
- Gudy Gaskill, mountaineer, driving force behind the creation of the Colorado Trail
- John Gegenhuber, actor
- Belle C. Greene, novelist, spent summers here from 1910 until her death in 1926
- Vicki Gunvalson, cast member of The Real Housewives of Orange County
- Stanley M. Hough, thoroughbred racehorse trainer
- Todd Hundley, catcher with the Mets, Cubs, and Dodgers; attended William Fremd High School
- Liz Johnson, professional bowler and USBC Hall of Famer
- Wendell E. Jones, educator, businessman, and politician
- Thymme Jones, drummer for Cheer-Accident
- Elinor Levin, member of the Iowa House of Representatives
- Larry Lujack, radio personality; lived in Palatine while hosting on WLS
- Carol Marin, journalist (NBC 5 Chicago, Chicago Tonight); attended Palatine High School
- Christina Moore, actress (MADtv, Jessie)
- Richard A. Mugalian, lawyer and politician
- Kris Myers, drummer for Umphrey's McGee
- Ted Nugent, guitarist and singer; grew up in Palatine
- Bernard E. Pedersen, businessman and Illinois state legislator
- Frederik Pohl, science-fiction writer and critic
- John Ratcliffe, member of the US House of Representatives from Texas.
- David Saunders, wide receiver and linebacker with several arena football teams
- Jack Schumacher, actor (Ransom Canyon)
- Jim Schwantz, linebacker with various teams; mayor of Palatine
- Mike Tauchman (born 1990), outfielder for the Chicago Cubs of Major League Baseball
- Scott Tolzien, quarterback for various teams
- Taylor Hill, Victoria's Secret model; born in Palatine.
- Rollin S. Williamson, state politician and judge
- Nabeela Syed, state politician; born and raised in Palatine

== Sister cities ==
- Fontenay-le-Comte, Vendée, France

== See also ==
- Born of Osiris, a band formed in Palatine by alumni of William Fremd High School.
