= Bernard E. Pedersen =

American businessman and politician (1925–1996)

Bernard E. Pedersen (November 24, 1925 – November 6, 1996) was an American businessman and politician.

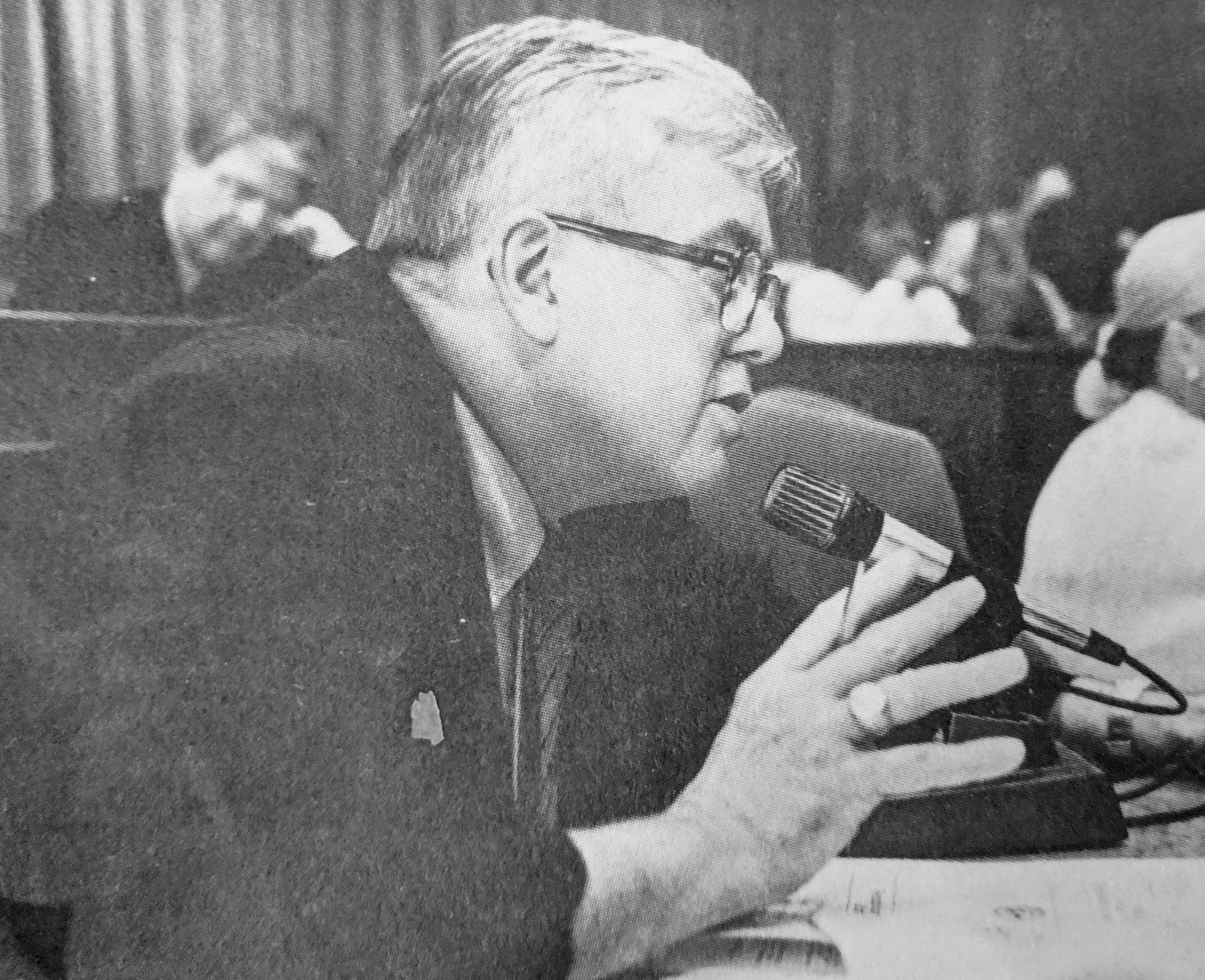
Pedersen (R) in General Assembly in Springfield, IL

Born in Grinnell, Iowa, Pedersen served in the United States Army during World War II. He then received his bachelor's degree from Grinnell College. He owned an insurance business in Palatine, Illinois. He served in the Illinois House of Representatives as a Republican, from 1982 until his death in 1996. He died of cancer in Palatine, Illinois only a few hours after being reelected to office.
