= Community Consolidated School District 15 =

School district in Illinois, United States

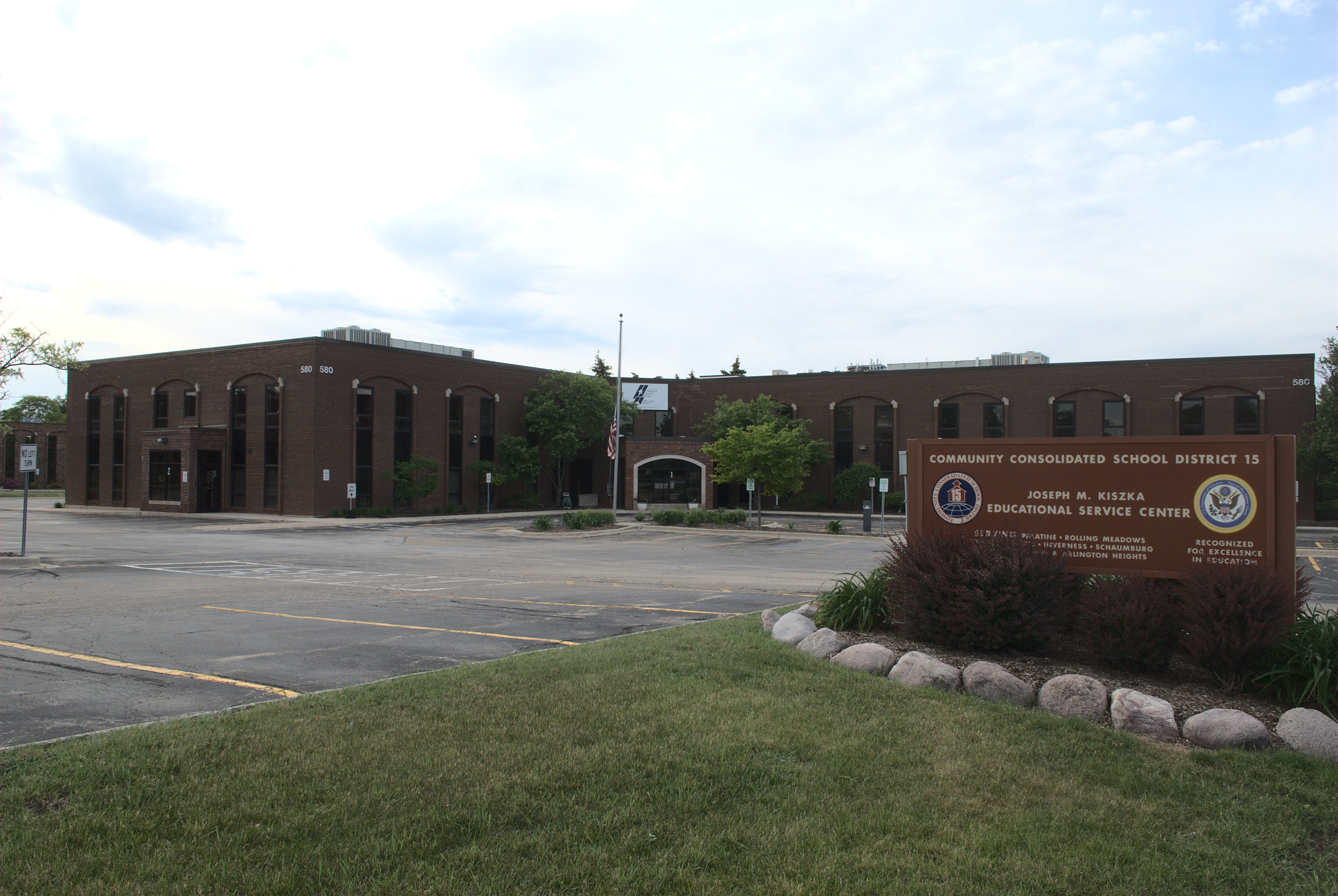

Address
- 580 North 1st Bank Drive Palatine, Illinois, 60067; United States
- Coordinates: 42.120816, -88.036873

District information
- Type: Public
- Motto: "to produce world-class learners by building a connected learning community."
- Grades: K-8
- Established: 1946
- President: Lisa Szczupaj
- Vice-president: Frank Annerino
- Superintendent: Laurie Heinz
- Asst. superintendent(s): Claire Kowalczyk
- School board: Lisa Szczupaj, Frank Annerino, Anthony Wang, Zubair Khan, James Taylor, Wenda Hunt, Samantha Ader
- Budget: $151,355,821 (2017–2018)

Students and staff
- Students: 11,477 (2021)
- Teachers: 818 (2021)

Other information
- Website: ccsd15.net

Palatine Community Consolidated School District 15, often initialized CCSD15, is a school district in the suburbs of Chicago, Illinois with its headquarters in the Joseph M. Kiszka Educational Service Center in Palatine. It is the second-largest elementary-only school district and 19th-largest in Illinois by student enrollment. It serves all or portions of Palatine, Rolling Meadows, Hoffman Estates, Arlington Heights, Inverness, Schaumburg, and South Barrington.

== Schools ==
The district has one preschool early childhood center, 14 elementary schools, five middle schools, and one alternative public day school.

=== Middle schools ===
- Carl Sandburg Middle School (Rolling Meadows)
- Plum Grove Middle School (Rolling Meadows)
- Thomas Jefferson Middle School (Hoffman Estates)
- Walter R. Sundling Middle School (Palatine)
- Winston Campus Middle School (Palatine)

=== Elementary schools ===
- Central Road Elementary School (Rolling Meadows)
- Frank C. Whiteley Elementary School (Hoffman Estates)
- Gray M. Sanborn Elementary School (Palatine)
- Hunting Ridge Elementary School (Palatine)
- Jane Addams Elementary School (Palatine)
- Kimball Hill Elementary School (Rolling Meadows)
- Lake Louise Elementary School (Palatine)
- Lincoln Elementary School (Palatine)
- Marion Jordan Elementary School (Palatine)
- Pleasant Hill Elementary School (Palatine)
- Stuart R. Paddock Elementary School (Palatine)
- Virginia Lake Elementary School (Palatine)
- Willow Bend Elementary School (Rolling Meadows)
- Winston Campus Elementary School (Palatine)

=== Alternative school ===
- John G. Conyers Learning Academy (Rolling Meadows)

=== Defunct schools ===
- Hillside School (early 1960s)
- Cardinal Drive School (1976)
- Joel Wood School (1979)
- Jonas E. Salk School (1981)

== Media ==
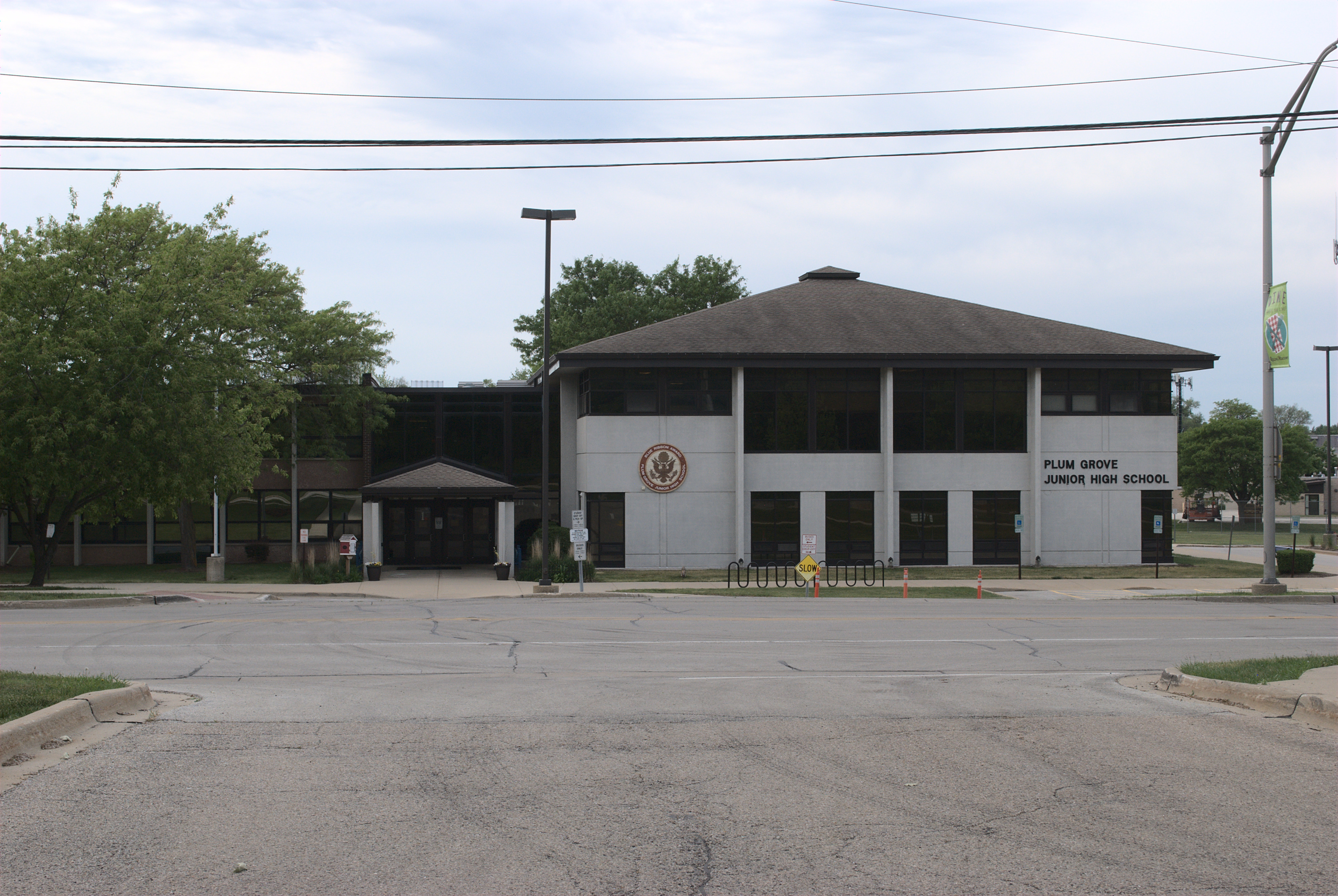
Plum Grove Middle School

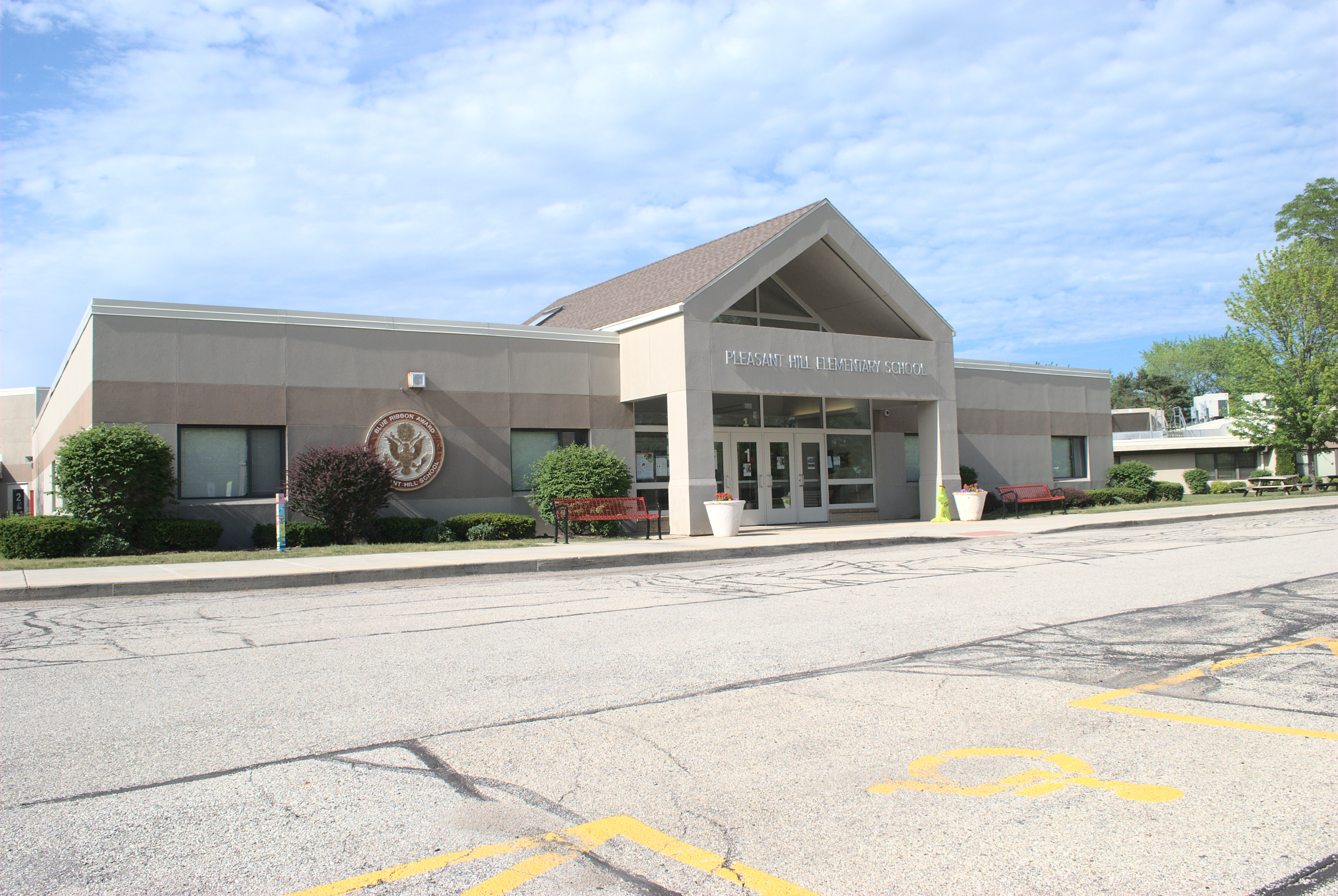
Pleasant Hill Elementary School

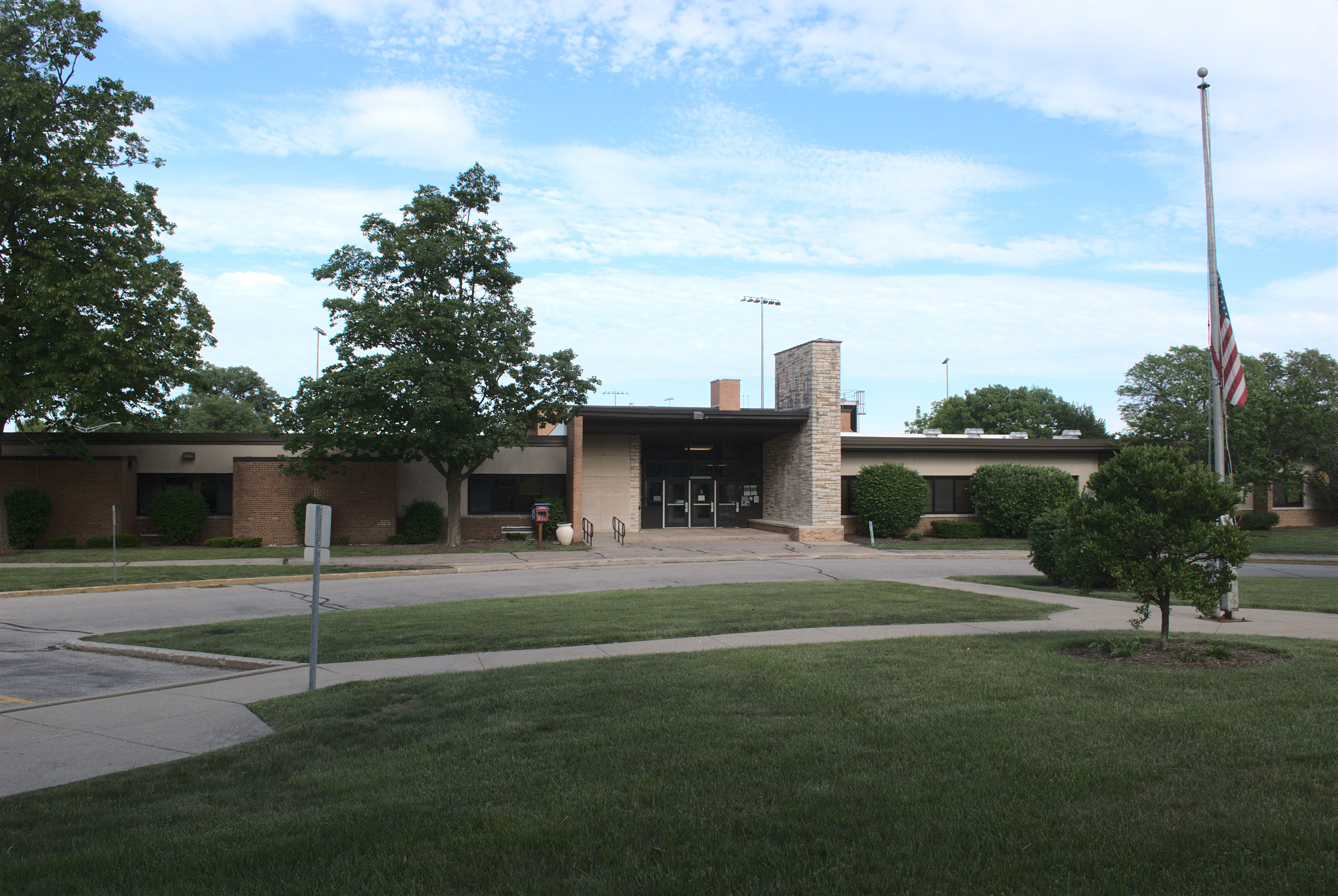
Gray M. Sanborn Elementary School
