= Quest Academy (Palatine, Illinois) =

Coordinates: 42°7′12″N 88°2′30″W

- 500 North Benton; Palatine, Illinois 60067

Information
- Type: Private school
- Motto: "Enabling gifted students to reach their full potential"
- Established: 1982
- Head of school: Dr. Lynette Breedlove
- Staff: 59
- Grades: Preschool-8
- Colors: Red, Black, and White
- Athletics: Track and basketball
- Athletics conference: Independent
- Mascot: Knight
- Website: www.questacademy.org

Quest Academy is an independent, coeducational day school serving intellectually gifted students from Preschool (age 3) through 8th grade located in Palatine, Illinois. The school is accredited by the Independent Schools Association of the Central States (ISACS), and it is a member of the National Association of Independent Schools, the National Association for Gifted Children, Lake Michigan Association of Independent Schools (LMAIS), the Association of Independent Schools for Gifted Students, and the Illinois Association for Gifted Children (IAGC).

There are two or three classes per grade, with the exception of Preschool and Junior Kindergarten, which only has one. Quest Academy offers a no ceiling approach to students' learning, but curriculum starts at least one grade level above students' chronological age.

== History ==
The school, first known as Creative Children's Academy, was founded in 1982 by Helene Bartz. The school was awarded full accreditation by the ISACS in 1988.

In 1993, the park district which then owned the school's facility announced its decision to raze the building. Two school administrators agreed to share the school board's purchase of the former Palatine Public Library, which would be remodeled into a school facility, as well as the head of school position. The school's name was changed to Quest Academy in 1999 and a capital campaign funded the addition of a gymnasium and performing arts wing. In 2012, the school expanded with the opening of the West Campus, which provided additional green space and new opportunities for outdoor learning.

== Extracurricular activities ==
Quest Academy's middle school athletic program include boys' and girls' basketball and track teams.

The character education program is called The Knights Program. To become a Knight, students must be courteous and follow eight specified character traits while also doing a "Knight" project. School-wide "Pageant" assemblies are held where new Knights and "Squires" are recognized. To be a Knight or Squire, you must demonstrate the character traits. All students start as "Pages."

Quest Academy uses the RCA House System. They use the houses of Rêveur, Onraka, Nukumori, Sollevare, and Isibindi. The school's Knights lead the houses along with a faculty advisor.

Quest Academy has a choir program for middle school, and lower school students can join the Harmonizers. Drama is a required class at Quest for all grades. Every grade performs in a play or musical. Past musicals include "Matilda Jr.", "Wizard of Oz" and "Oliver!".

Quest also competes in several math competitions, including The Latin School of Chicago, AMC 8, the Noetic Math Competition, and Mathcounts.

Quest also has Scholastic Bowl, Forensic Speech, and Policy Debate teams. Their Scholastic Bowl team has qualified for the NAQT Middle School National Championship Tournament 11 times. They have also won Illinois state championships 7 times in IESA format, more than any other middle school.

A Quest student won 2nd place nationally at National History Day in June 2025 in the Junior Individual Website category. Quest also participates in the Illinois Student Invention Convention.

Quest Academy's gifted curriculum covers mathematics, Language Arts, Social Studies (Language Arts and Social Studies are combined in middle school), art, drama, science, music, Spanish, PE, CSAI (Computer Science Artificial Intelligence), and library. They use novel teaching techniques, including skill-based math classes, historical simulations, and dialogue-based Spanish. Elective trimester-long classes, known as flex classes, are also offered to middle school students several days a week, helping them engage in the arts, sciences, sports, or other activities.

Universities or colleges currently or previously enrolling former Quest students include: Princeton University, Yale University, Harvard University, MIT, Tufts University, Brown University, Duke University, University of Chicago, Georgetown University, Cornell University, University of Illinois, Berklee College of Music, Boston University, Grinnell College, Boston College, Washington University, Purdue University, USC and Dartmouth College.
