= West Chicago Township, Illinois =

Former township in Cook County, Illinois

Coordinates: 41°52′N 87°42′W

West Chicago Township
- Former Township
- Interactive map of West Chicago Township
- Country: United States
- State: Illinois
- County: Cook

West Chicago Township was a township in Cook County, Illinois that was part of the City of Chicago. It comprised that part of pre-1889 Chicago west of the Chicago River. When various townships to its north and west were annexed to Chicago in 1889, they were maintained as townships and not incorporated into West Township. The township limits were North Av. to the north, the Chicago river to the east, Pershing (39th) St. to the south, and was bound to the west largely by Harlem Avenue. Chicago residents voted to eliminate the townships in the city in 1902, including West Chicago Township; nevertheless, they remain in use for the purposes of property assessment.
