= New Trier Township, Illinois =

New Trier Township
- Township
- Flag Seal

- Location in Cook County
- Country: United States
- State: Illinois
- County: Cook
- Established: 1850

Area
  - Total: 16.30 sq mi (42.21 km^{2})
  - Land: 16.00 sq mi (41.43 km^{2})
  - Water: 0.29 sq mi (0.76 km^{2}) 1.80%

Population (2020)
  - Total: 57,371
  - Density: 3,587/sq mi (1,385/km^{2})
- Time zone: UTC-6 (CST)
  - Summer (DST): UTC-5 (CDT)
- FIPS code: 17-031-52909
- Website: www.newtriertownship.com

New Trier Township (/trɪər/) is one of 29 townships in Cook County, Illinois, United States. As of the 2020 census, its population was 57,371.

The township contains New Trier High School, but the borders of the school district do not line up exactly with the borders of the township.

== Geography ==
The township covers approximately 16 square miles (41 km^{2}). The township comprises the villages of Wilmette, Kenilworth, Winnetka, Glencoe, and portions of Glenview and Northfield. There is also a small unincorporated area near Winnetka known as Indian Hill because of the nearby country club of the same name.

=== Cities, towns, and villages ===
- Glencoe
- Glenview
- Kenilworth
- Northfield (eastern third)
- Wilmette
- Winnetka

=== Unincorporated Towns ===
- Hubbard Woods at 42.115582°N 87.742844°W
- Indian Hill at 42.093590°N 87.723772°W

=== Ghost Town ===
- Gross Point at 42.078918°N 87.722565°W

== History ==
New Trier Township was established in 1850 as part of the Illinois township system and originally served largely rural communities along the North Shore of Cook County. Early township government responsibilities included tax assessment and collection, poor relief administration, road oversight, public health coordination, and election administration. A 1946 Township report described the Township as responsible for welfare relief, public health services, and assistance programs for dependent children, the blind, and elderly residents.

During the postwar period, the Township expanded its role in social services and public assistance. By the early 21st century, Township operations included food pantry services, emergency assistance programs, disability support initiatives, employment assistance, and community partnerships with nonprofit agencies. Since 1961, New Trier Township has operated from 739 Elm Street in Winnetka, Illinois. The building was originally constructed in 1922 as the First National Bank of Winnetka and was designed in the Tudor Revival style by architect Clifford Shopbell. The building is a Local Winnetka Landmark.

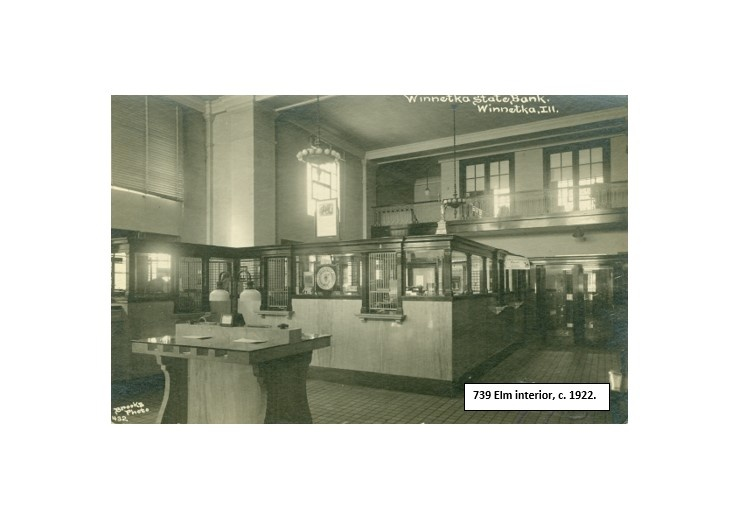

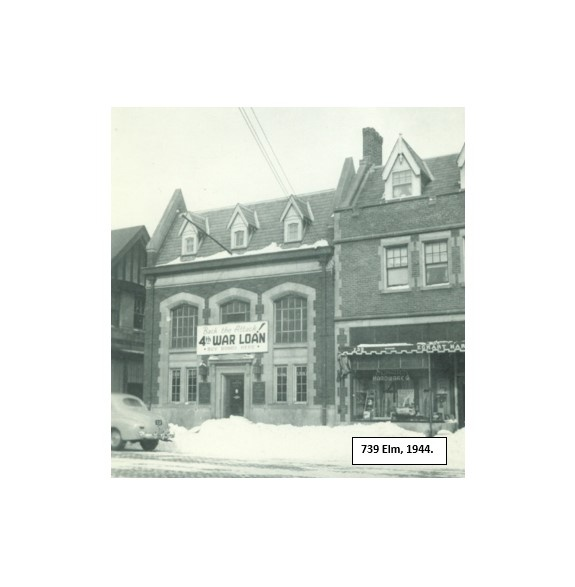

== Demographics ==
Historical population
Census	Pop.	Note	%±
2010	55,424		—
2020	57,371		3.5%
U.S. Decennial Census

As of the 2020 census, there were 57,371 people living in the township. The population density was approximately 3,500/sq mi (1,400/km^{2}). There were 21,114 housing units. The racial makeup of the township was 82.5% White, 8.8% Asian, 0.8% Black or African American, 1.1% from other races, and 6.8% from two or more races. Hispanic or Latino of any race were 4.6% of the population.

The median age in the township was 45.8 years. 29.3% of the population was under 18 years, and 19.7% were 65 years or older.

There were 20,447 households, out of which 38.9% had people under the age of 18 living with them, and 35.9% had people 65 years or older living with them. 69.2% of households were married couples living together, 19.5% had a female householder with no spouse present, 10.3% had a male householder with no spouse present, and 1.0% were cohabiting couples living together. The average household size was 2.72 and the average family size 3.20.

The median income for a household in the township was $177,672, and the median income for a family was $227,204. 3.3% of residents were below the poverty line.

== Township services ==
- Angel Fund – provides emergency assistance to pay for food, shelter, medical care, and other necessities. Funded fully by private donations, it is utilized by those who are not eligible for assistance from other funds.
- Access to Care – a suburban Cook County program that helps uninsured and underinsured residents get discounted medical services and prescription medication.
- Assessor's Assistance – the Township Assessor's Office assists taxpayers with property tax issues.
- Child Care Scholarships
- Dial-a-Ride – provides discounted taxi fares to senior citizens traveling within the township.
- Employment Counseling
- Escorted Transportation
- General Assistance and Emergency Aid
- Handicap Parking Tags
- Pantry
- Peer Jury – provides an alternative to the traditional criminal justice system for non-violent first-time juvenile offenders.
- Voter Registration

== See also ==
- Trier in Germany
