= North Chicago Township, Illinois =

Former township in Cook County, Illinois

Coordinates: 41°54′N 87°38′W

North Chicago Township
- Former Township
- Interactive map of North Chicago Township
- Country: United States
- State: Illinois
- County: Cook

North Chicago Township was a township in Cook County, Illinois that was part of the City of Chicago. It comprised that part of pre-1889 Chicago north and east of the Chicago River. When Lake View Township to its north was annexed to Chicago in 1889, it was maintained as a township and not incorporated into North Chicago Township, so the latter continued to be bound to the north by Fullerton Avenue. Chicago residents voted to eliminate the townships in the city in 1902, including North Chicago Township; nevertheless, they remain in use for the purposes of property assessment.
