= Indian Hill, Illinois =

- Unincorporated community
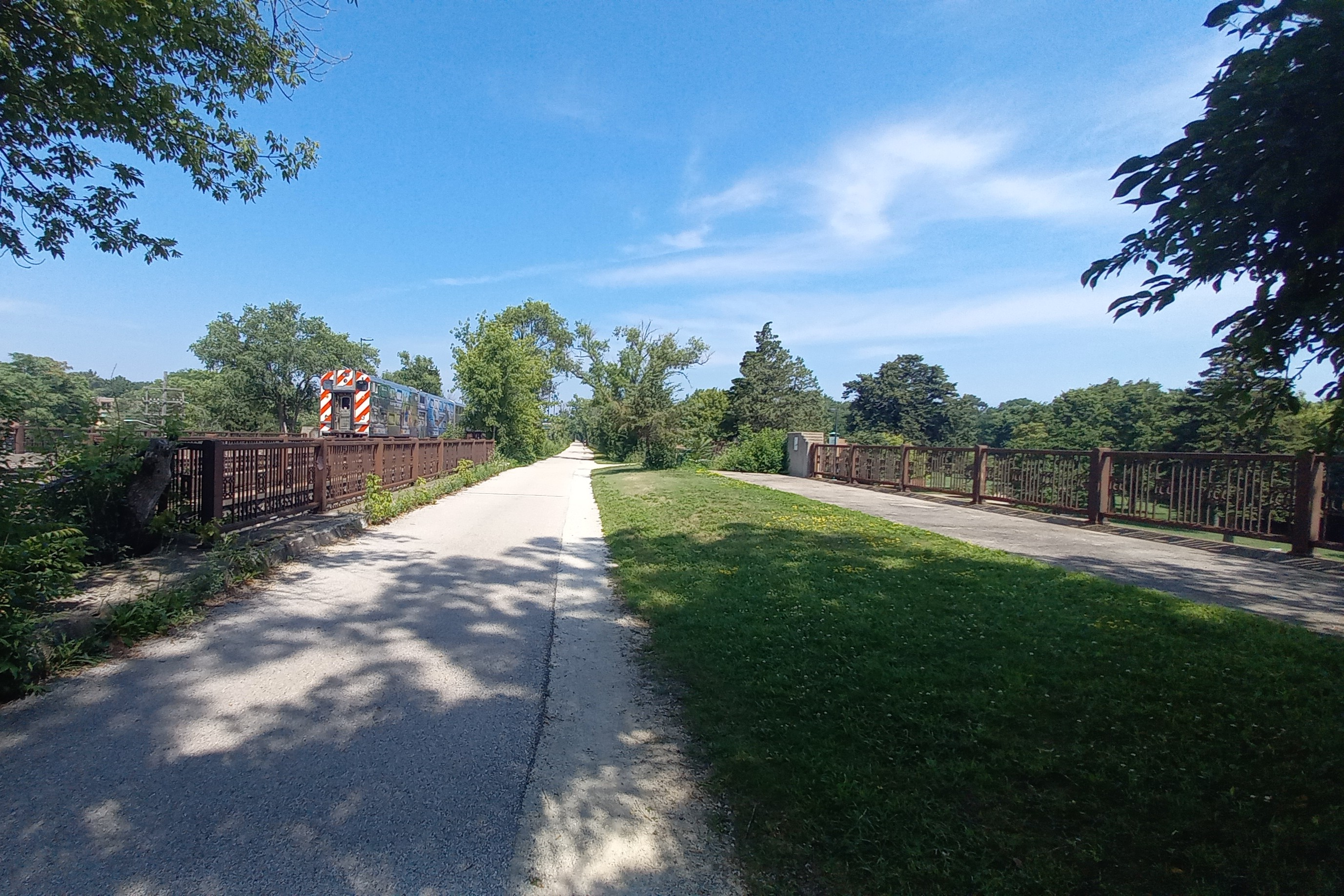
- Green Bay Trail and Metra's Union Pacific North Line

- Location within Illinois
- Coordinates: 42.0936°N 87.7239°W
- Country: United States
- State: Illinois
- County: Cook
- Township: New Trier
- Elevation: 722 ft (220 m)
- Time zone: UTC-6 (Central (CST))
  - Summer (DST): UTC-5 (CDT)
- Area codes: 847 and 224

Indian Hill is an unincorporated community in New Trier Township, Cook County, Illinois south of Winnetka. The center of the community is located near Indian Hill station on Green Bay Road. It is home to a small "downtown" section near the train station by the intersection of Winnetka Avenue. It takes its name from a nearby golf club. It had a population of about 6,000.
