= Cook County, Illinois =

County in Illinois, United States

Cook County
- County
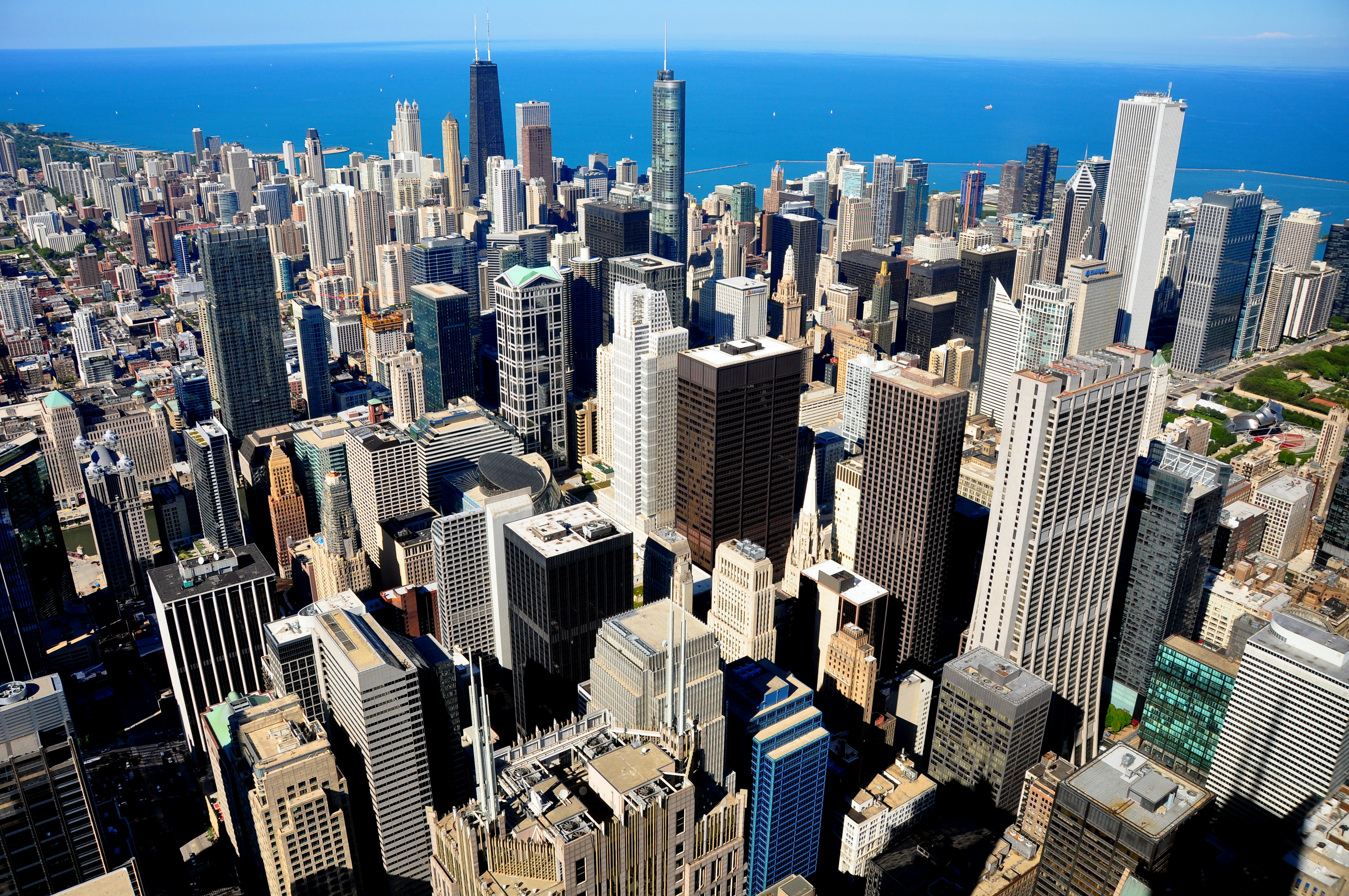
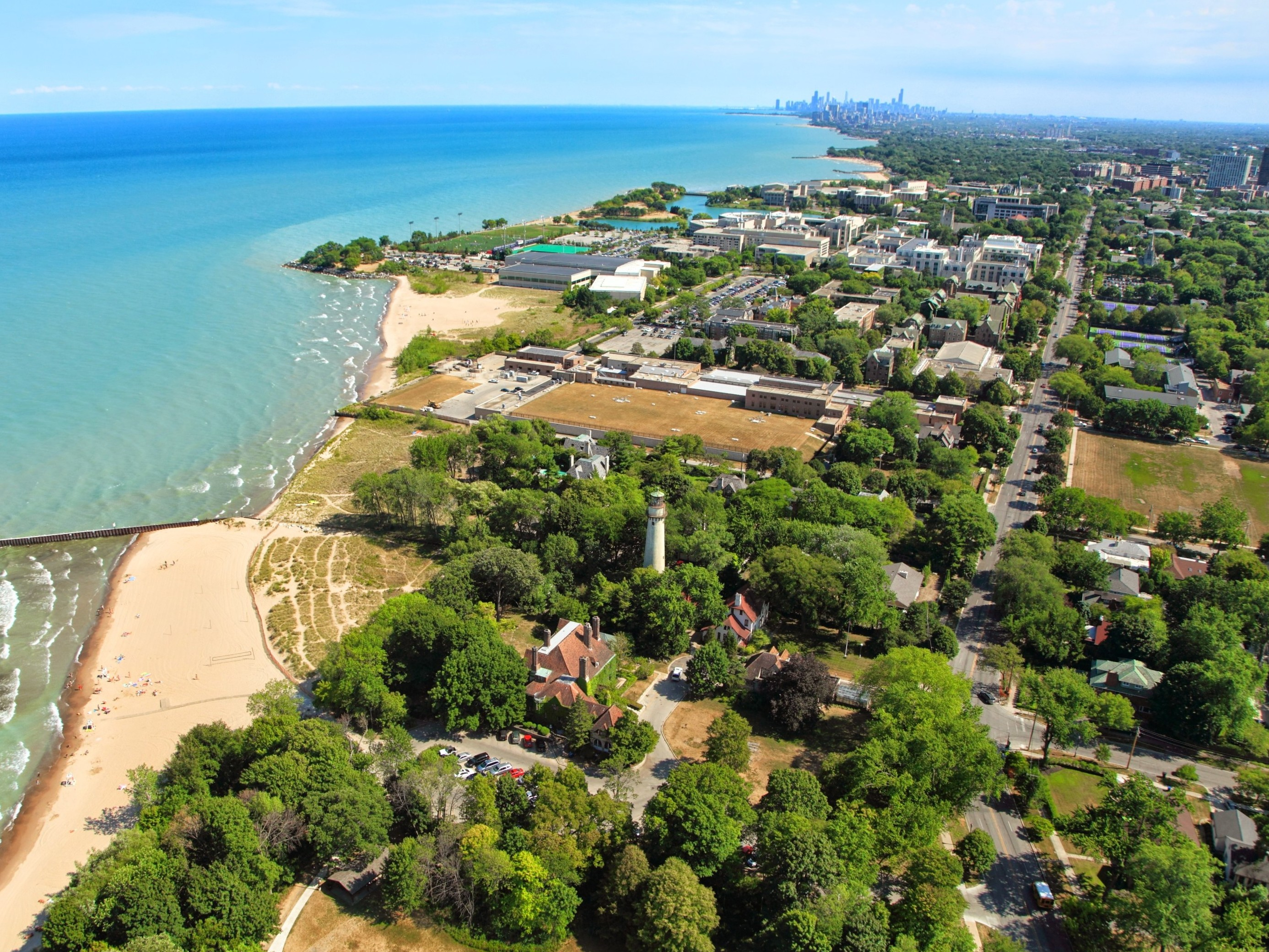
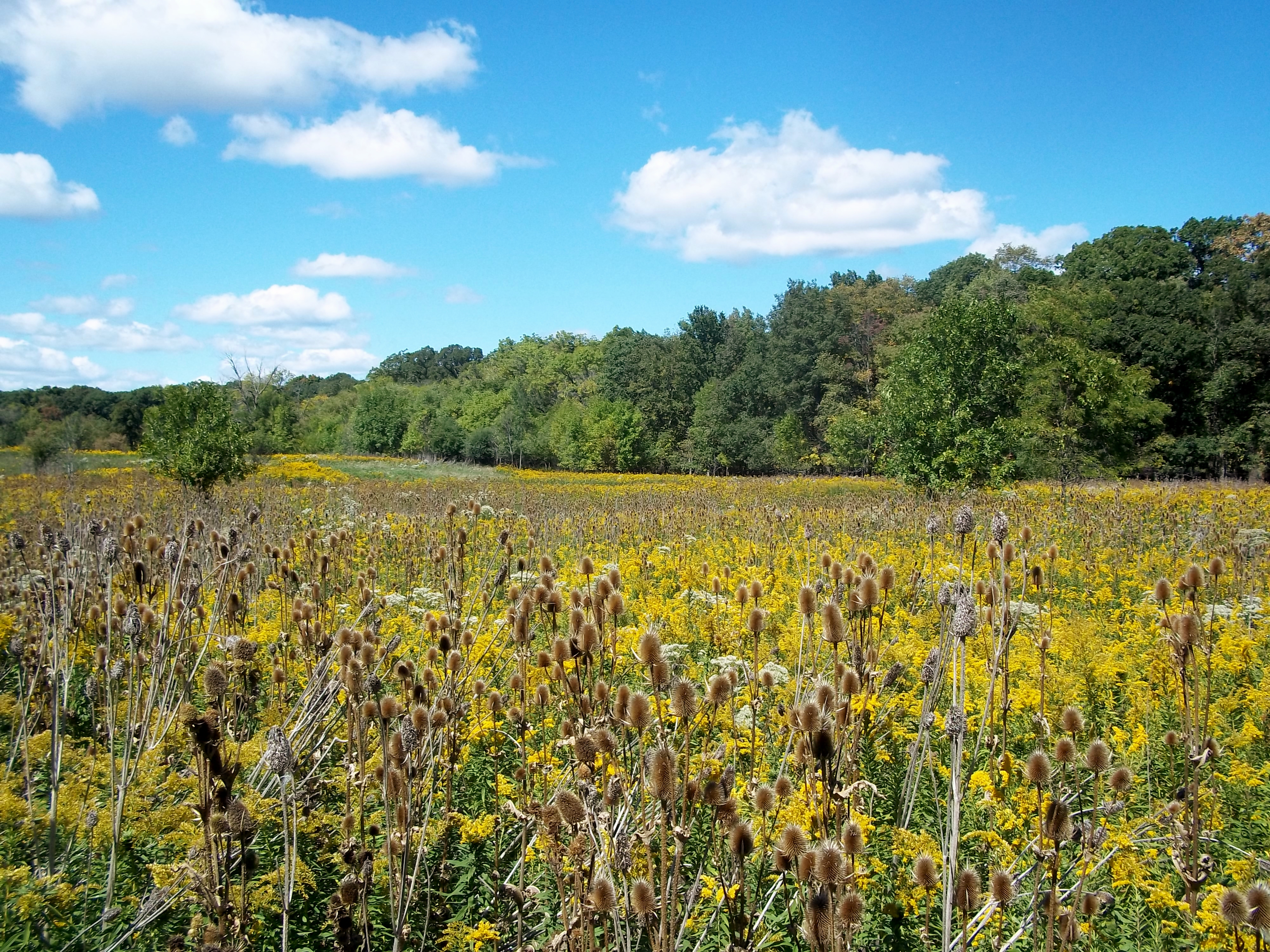
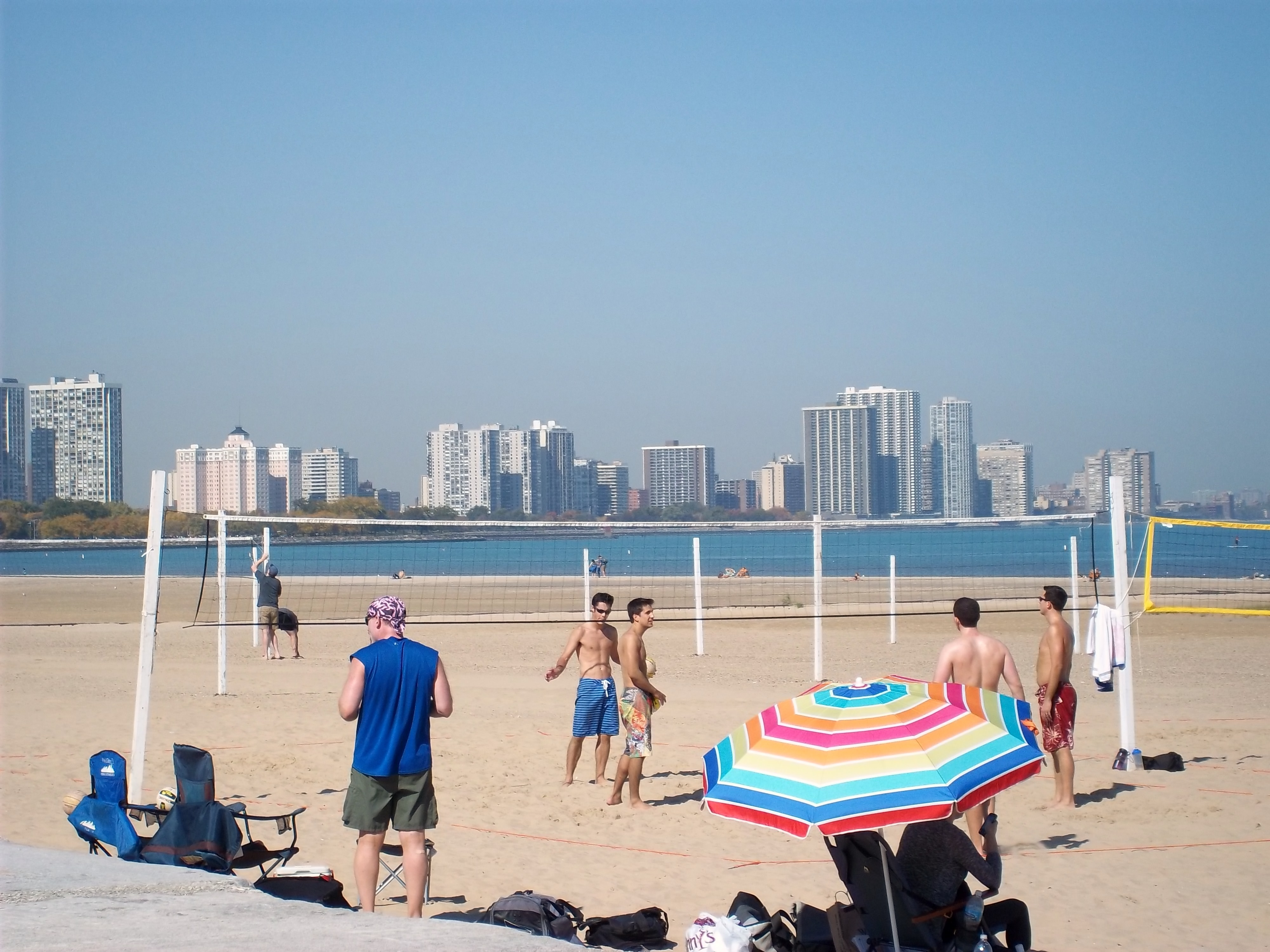
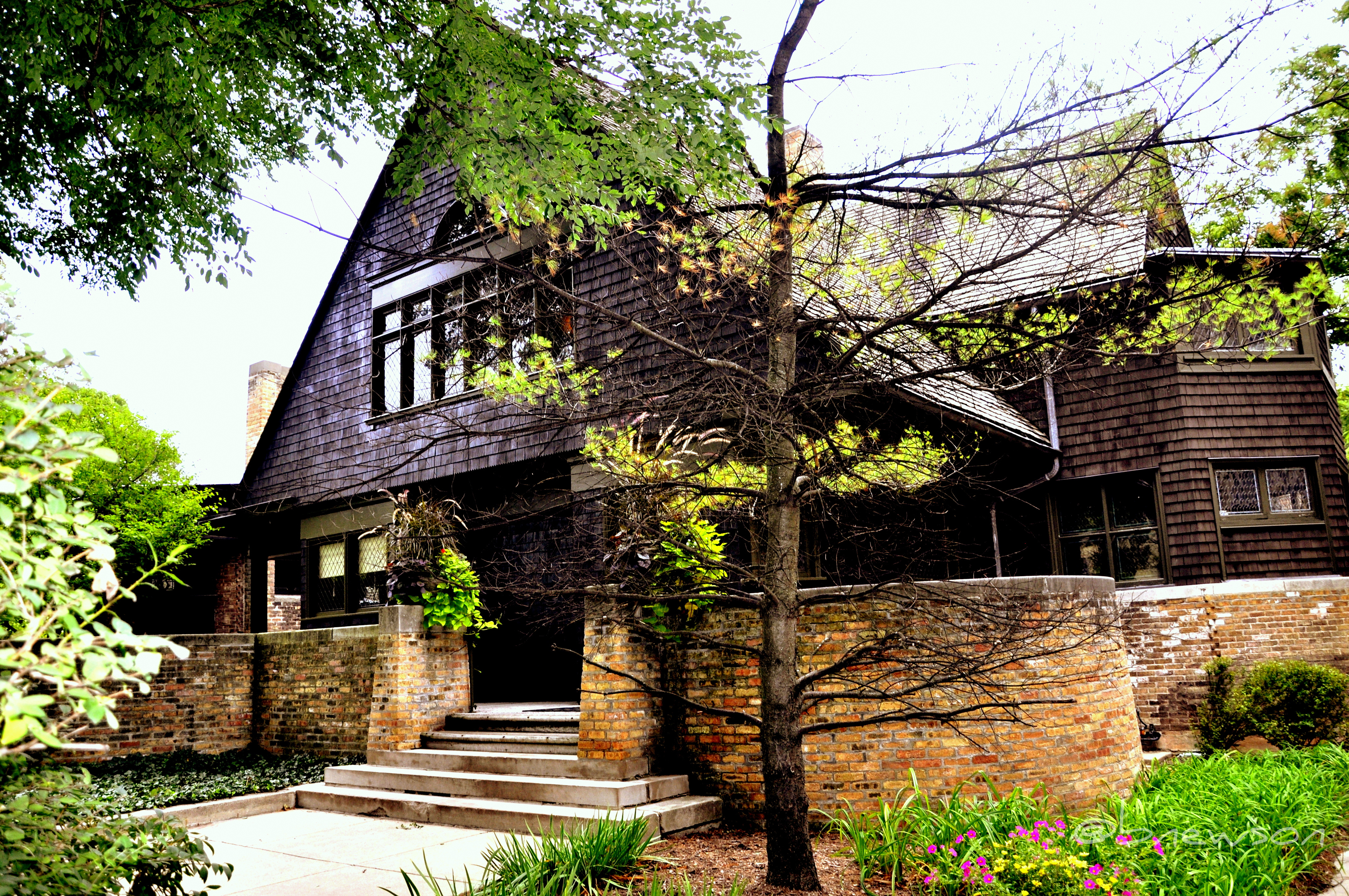
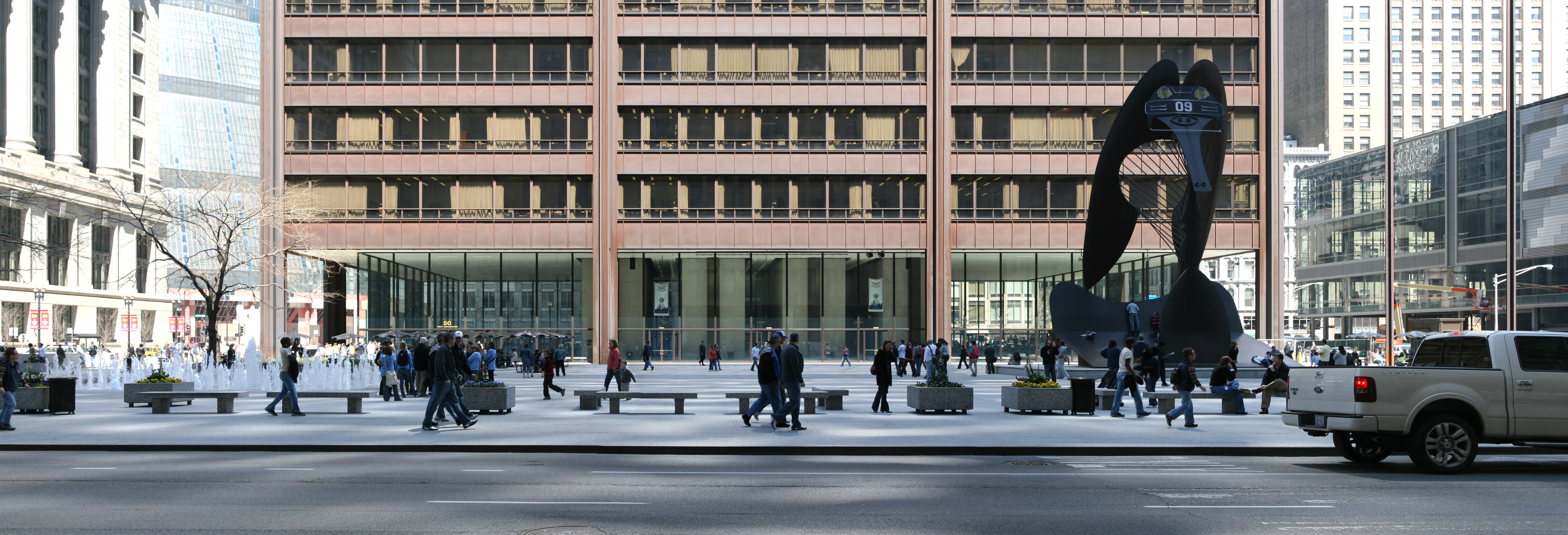
- Aerial view of Chicago Evanston and the lakeshore Cook County Forest Preserves Montrose Beach Frank Lloyd Wright Studio Cook County Circuit Court at Daley Plaza with Chicago Picasso

- Flag Seal

- Location within Illinois

- Illinois's location within the United States
- Coordinates: 41°48′31″N 87°53′20″W
- Country: United States
- State: Illinois
- Region: Northern Illinois
- Metro area: Chicago metropolitan area
- Incorporated: January 15, 1831; 195 years ago
- Named for: Daniel Pope Cook
- County seat: Chicago
- Incorporated municipalities: 135 (total): 23 cities, 1 town, 111 villages; (located entirely or partially within county boundaries)

Government
  - Type: County commission
  - Body: Board of Commissioners
  - President: Toni R. Preckwinkle (D)

Area
  - County: 1,635 sq mi (4,230 km^{2})
  - Land: 945 sq mi (2,450 km^{2})
  - Water: 690 sq mi (1,800 km^{2}) 42.2%
  - Metro: 10,874 sq mi (28,160 km^{2})
  - Rank: 6th largest county in Illinois
- Highest elevation: 950 ft (290 m)
- Lowest elevation: 580 ft (180 m)

Population (2020)
  - County: 5,275,541
  - Estimate (2025): 5,194,625 ▼
  - Density: 5,580/sq mi (2,160/km^{2})

GDP
  - County: $546.440 billion (2024)
- Time zone: UTC−6 (Central)
  - Summer (DST): UTC−5 (Central)
- ZIP Code prefixes: 600xx–608xx
- Area codes: 847/224, 312/872, 773/872, 708/464
- FIPS code: 17-031
- GNIS feature ID: 1784766
- Congressional districts: 1st, 2nd, 3rd, 4th, 5th, 6th, 7th, 8th, 9th, 10th, 11th
- Website: cookcountyil.gov

Cook County is the most populous county in the U.S. state of Illinois and the second-most-populous county in the United States, after Los Angeles County, California. More than 40 percent of all residents of Illinois live within Cook County. As of 2020, the population was 5,275,541. The county seat is Chicago, the most populous city in Illinois and the third most populous city in the United States. The county is at the center of the Chicago metropolitan area.

Cook County was incorporated in 1831 and named for Daniel Pope Cook, an early Illinois statesman. It achieved its present boundaries in 1839. Within a century, the county recorded explosive population growth, going from a trading post village with a little over six hundred residents to four million, rivaling Paris by the Great Depression. During the first half of the 20th century, it had the absolute majority of Illinois's population.

There are more than 800 local governmental units and nearly 130 municipalities located wholly or partially within Cook County, the largest of which is Chicago. The city is home to approximately 54 percent of the entire county's population. The part of the county outside of the Chicago and Evanston city limits is divided into 29 townships; these often divide or share governmental services with local municipalities. Townships within Chicago were abolished in 1902 but are retained for real estate assessment purposes. Evanston Township was formerly coterminous with the City of Evanston but was abolished in 2014. County government is overseen by the Cook County Board of Commissioners, with its president as chief executive, Cook County Clerk and Cook County Treasurer. Countywide state government offices include the Circuit Court of Cook County, the Cook County State's Attorney, the Cook County Sheriff, and the Cook County Assessor.

Geographically, the county is the sixth-largest in Illinois by land area and the largest by total area. It shares the state's Lake Michigan shoreline with Lake County. Including its lake area, Cook County has a total area of 1,635 square miles (4,234.6 km^{2}), the largest county in Illinois, of which 945 square miles (2,447.5 km^{2}) is land and 690 square miles (1,787.1 km^{2}) (42.16%) is water. Land-use in Cook County is mostly urban and densely populated. Within Cook County, the state of Illinois took advantage of its Lake Michigan access and the Chicago Portage, beginning with the construction of the Illinois and Michigan Canal in 1848. This helped make the region a central transit hub for the nation. Chicago, with its location on the Great Lakes and via the St. Lawrence Seaway, is a global port city, giving Cook County an international shipping port.

Cook County's population is larger than that of 28 U.S. states and territories, and larger than the population of 11 of the 13 Canadian provinces and territories. The county is at the center of the Chicago metropolitan area, which has a population of approximately 10 million people.

== History ==
Cook County was created on January 15, 1831, out of Putnam County by an act of the Illinois General Assembly. It was the 54th county established in Illinois and was named after Daniel Pope Cook. As a politician, lawyer and newspaper publisher from the U.S. state of Illinois as well as an anti-slavery advocate, Cook became one of the earliest and youngest statesmen in Illinois history. He served as the second U.S. representative from Illinois and the state's first attorney general. In 1839, DuPage County was carved out of Cook County.

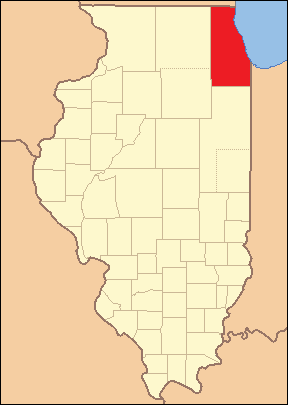
Cook County from 1831 to 1836

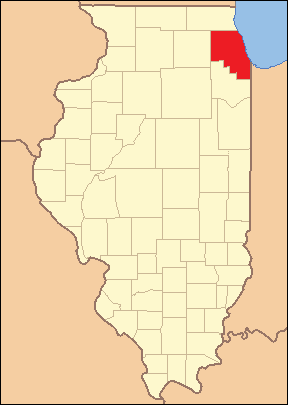
Cook County 1836–1839 after the creation of McHenry and Will counties

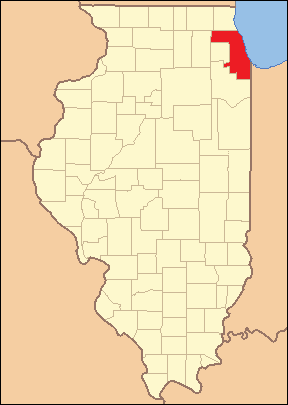
Cook County's current size was formed in 1839 by the creation of DuPage County

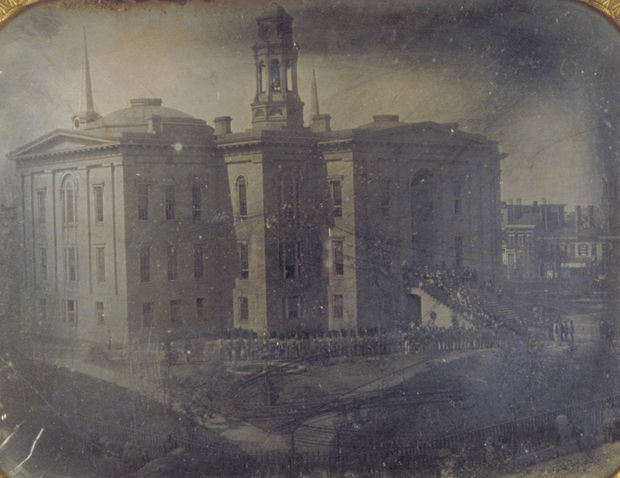
An 1855 daguerreotype attributed to Alexander Hesler of the Cook County Court House and City Hall. Believed to be the oldest surviving photograph taken in Chicago.

The shape of Cook County and the neighboring counties has remained the same since DuPage County was formed. The population in each county and the split of agriculture compared to residential and industrial activity has changed dramatically over the intervening decades to 2020. The county began with 10,201 people in the census of 1840, growing rapidly to 5,150,233 people estimated for 2019 by the US census. Growth was rapid in the 19th century, with the County reaching 2.4 million people by 1910. In the 20th century, the County reached a population of 5.1 million.

Cook County is nearly completely developed, with little agricultural land remaining near the outer county boundaries.

== Demographics ==
Historical population
Census	Pop.	Note	%±
1840	10,201		—
1850	43,385		325.3%
1860	144,954		234.1%
1870	349,966		141.4%
1880	607,524		73.6%
1890	1,191,922		96.2%
1900	1,838,735		54.3%
1910	2,405,233		30.8%
1920	3,053,017		26.9%
1930	3,982,123		30.4%
1940	4,063,342		2.0%
1950	4,508,792		11.0%
1960	5,129,725		13.8%
1970	5,492,369		7.1%
1980	5,253,655		−4.3%
1990	5,105,067		−2.8%
2000	5,376,741		5.3%
2010	5,194,675		−3.4%
2020	5,275,541		1.6%
2025 (est.)	5,194,625	▼	−1.5%
U.S. Decennial Census; 1790–1960 1900–1990; 1990–2000 2010–2019

=== 2020 census ===
As of the 2020 census, the county had a population of 5,275,541. The median age was 37.4 years. 20.9% of residents were under the age of 18 and 15.1% of residents were 65 years of age or older. For every 100 females there were 94.0 males, and for every 100 females age 18 and over there were 91.5 males age 18 and over.

The racial makeup of the county was 44.5% White, 22.9% Black or African American, 1.1% American Indian and Alaska Native, 7.8% Asian, <0.1% Native Hawaiian and Pacific Islander, 13.4% from some other race, and 10.4% from two or more races. Hispanic or Latino residents of any race comprised 26.2% of the population.

99.9% of residents lived in urban areas, while 0.1% lived in rural areas.

There were 2,086,940 households in the county, of which 28.4% had children under the age of 18 living in them. Of all households, 38.5% were married-couple households, 21.5% were households with a male householder and no spouse or partner present, and 33.2% were households with a female householder and no spouse or partner present. About 32.5% of all households were made up of individuals and 10.9% had someone living alone who was 65 years of age or older.

There were 2,264,966 housing units, of which 7.9% were vacant. Among occupied housing units, 54.3% were owner-occupied and 45.7% were renter-occupied. The homeowner vacancy rate was 1.7% and the rental vacancy rate was 7.5%.

=== Racial and ethnic composition ===
Cook County, Illinois – Racial and ethnic composition Note: the US Census treats Hispanic/Latino as an ethnic category. This table excludes Latinos from the racial categories and assigns them to a separate category. Hispanics/Latinos may be of any race.
Race / Ethnicity (NH = Non-Hispanic)	Pop 1980	Pop 1990	Pop 2000	Pop 2010	Pop 2020	% 1980	% 1990	% 2000	% 2010	% 2020
White alone (NH)	3,271,479	2,915,634	2,558,709	2,278,358	2,135,243	62.27%	57.11%	47.59%	43.86%	40.47%
Black or African American alone (NH)	1,336,070	1,301,196	1,390,448	1,265,778	1,185,601	25.43%	25.49%	25.86%	24.37%	22.47%
Native American or Alaska Native alone (NH)	8,214	7,743	6,754	6,682	5,655	0.16%	0.15%	0.13%	0.13%	0.11%
Asian alone (NH)	111,602	181,285	257,843	318,869	408,691	2.12%	3.55%	4.80%	6.14%	7.75%
Native Hawaiian or Pacific Islander alone (NH)	x	x	1,543	1,043	961	x	x	0.03%	0.02%	0.02%
Other race alone (NH)	26,968	5,015	7,291	7,751	20,538	0.51%	0.10%	0.14%	0.15%	0.39%
Mixed race or Multiracial (NH)	x	x	82,413	71,432	136,074	x	x	1.53%	1.38%	2.58%
Hispanic or Latino (any race)	499,322	694,194	1,071,740	1,244,762	1,382,778	9.50%	13.60%	19.93%	23.96%	26.21%
Total	5,253,655	5,105,067	5,376,741	5,194,675	5,275,541	100.00%	100.00%	100.00%	100.00%	100.00%

Racial / Ethnic Profile of places in Cook County, Illinois (2020 Census)
Following is a table of towns and census designated places in Cook County, Illinois. Data for the United States (with and without Puerto Rico), the state of Illinois, and Cook County itself have been included for comparison purposes.
The majority racial/ethnic group is coded per the key below. Communities that extend into and adjacent county or counties are delineated with a ‡ followed by an accompanying explanatory note. The full population of each community has been tabulated including the population in adjacent counties.

Majority minority with no dominant group
Majority White
Majority Black
Majority Hispanic
Majority Asian

Racial and ethnic composition of places in Cook County, Illinois (2020 Census) (NH = Non-Hispanic) Note: the US Census treats Hispanic/Latino as an ethnic category. This table excludes Latinos from the racial categories and assigns them to a separate category. Hispanics/Latinos may be of any race.
Place	Designation	Total Population	White alone (NH)	%	Black or African American alone (NH)	%	Native American or Alaska Native alone (NH)	%	Asian alone (NH)	%	Pacific Islander alone (NH)	%	Other race alone (NH)	%	Mixed race or Multiracial (NH)	%	Hispanic or Latino (any race)	%
United States of America (50 states and D.C.)	x	331,449,281	191,697,647	57.84%	39,940,338	12.05%	2,251,699	0.68%	19,618,719	5.92%	622,018	0.19%	1,689,833	0.51%	13,548,983	4.09%	62,080,044	18.73%
United States of America (50 states, D.C., and Puerto Rico)	x	334,735,155	191,722,195	57.28%	39,944,624	11.93%	2,252,011	0.67%	19,621,465	5.86%	622,109	0.19%	1,692,341	0.51%	13,551,323	4.05%	65,329,087	19.52%
Illinois	State	12,812,508	7,472,751	58.32%	1,775,612	13.86%	16,561	0.13%	747,280	5.83%	2,959	0.02%	45,080	0.35%	414,855	3.24%	2,337,410	18.24%
Cook County	County	5,275,541	2,135,243	40.47%	1,185,601	22.47%	5,655	0.11%	408,691	7.75%	961	0.02%	20,538	0.39%	136,074	2.58%	1,382,778	26.21%
Alsip	Village	19,063	8,895	46.66%	4,235	22.22%	8	0.04%	359	1.88%	8	0.04%	50	0.26%	452	2.37%	5,056	26.52%
Arlington Heights	Village	77,676	60,333	77.67%	1,195	1.54%	56	0.07%	8,323	10.72%	14	0.02%	207	0.27%	2,160	2.78%	5,388	6.94%
Barrington ‡	Village	10,722	8,926	83.25%	117	1.09%	8	0.07%	643	6.00%	0	0.00%	12	0.11%	365	3.40%	651	6.07%
Barrington Hills ‡	Village	4,114	3,369	81.89%	39	0.95%	4	0.10%	348	8.46%	0	0.00%	18	0.44%	124	3.01%	212	5.15%
Bartlett ‡	Village	41,105	26,377	64.17%	995	2.42%	31	0.08%	7,345	17.87%	6	0.01%	95	0.23%	1,309	3.18%	4,947	12.04%
Bedford Park	Village	602	332	55.15%	15	2.49%	1	0.17%	10	1.66%	1	0.17%	0	0.00%	21	3.49%	222	36.88%
Bellwood	Village	18,789	545	2.90%	12,705	67.62%	19	0.10%	119	0.63%	2	0.01%	65	0.35%	300	1.60%	5,034	26.79%
Bensenville ‡	Village	18,813	7,065	37.55%	735	3.91%	23	0.12%	921	4.90%	0	0.00%	54	0.29%	317	1.69%	9,698	51.55%
Berkeley	Village	5,338	1,242	23.27%	1,718	32.18%	13	0.24%	219	4.10%	3	0.06%	13	0.24%	122	2.29%	2,008	37.62%
Berwyn	City	57,250	13,372	23.36%	4,622	8.07%	79	0.14%	1,365	2.38%	9	0.02%	189	0.33%	888	1.55%	36,726	64.15%
Blue Island	City	22,558	3,442	15.26%	6,817	30.22%	38	0.17%	86	0.38%	6	0.03%	64	0.28%	385	1.71%	11,720	51.95%
Bridgeview	Village	17,027	11,287	66.29%	658	3.86%	15	0.09%	564	3.31%	4	0.02%	67	0.39%	441	2.59%	3,991	23.44%
Broadview	Village	7,998	739	9.24%	5,642	70.54%	3	0.04%	171	2.14%	0	0.00%	38	0.48%	180	2.25%	1,225	15.32%
Brookfield	Village	19,476	12,791	65.68%	597	3.07%	27	0.14%	346	1.78%	3	0.02%	52	0.27%	640	3.29%	5,020	25.78%
Buffalo Grove ‡	Village	43,212	26,762	61.93%	517	1.20%	36	0.08%	11,865	27.46%	6	0.01%	115	0.27%	1,057	2.45%	2,854	6.60%
Burbank	City	29,439	15,703	53.34%	518	1.76%	24	0.08%	906	3.08%	4	0.01%	79	0.27%	555	1.89%	11,650	39.57%
Burnham	Village	4,046	491	12.14%	2,419	59.79%	2	0.05%	12	0.30%	0	0.00%	15	0.37%	72	1.78%	1,035	25.58%
Burr Ridge ‡	Village	11,192	8,212	73.37%	208	1.86%	5	0.04%	1,834	16.39%	0	0.00%	27	0.24%	297	2.65%	609	5.44%
Calumet City	City	36,033	2,676	7.43%	25,959	72.04%	51	0.14%	50	0.14%	4	0.01%	116	0.32%	701	1.95%	6,476	17.97%
Calumet Park	Village	7,025	186	2.65%	6,230	88.68%	9	0.13%	5	0.07%	0	0.00%	37	0.53%	105	1.49%	453	6.45%
Chicago ‡	City	2,746,388	863,622	31.45%	787,551	28.68%	3,332	0.12%	189,857	6.91%	529	0.02%	11,536	0.42%	70,443	2.56%	819,518	29.84%
Chicago Heights	City	27,480	4,438	16.15%	11,487	41.80%	30	0.11%	74	0.27%	23	0.08%	103	0.37%	611	2.22%	10,714	38.99%
Chicago Ridge	Village	14,433	9,983	69.17%	1,388	9.62%	5	0.03%	336	2.33%	0	0.00%	55	0.38%	408	2.83%	2,258	15.64%
Cicero	City	85,268	5,332	6.25%	2,870	3.37%	71	0.08%	456	0.53%	14	0.02%	162	0.19%	473	0.55%	75,890	89.00%
Country Club Hills	City	16,775	960	5.72%	14,365	85.63%	20	0.12%	129	0.77%	1	0.01%	46	0.27%	408	2.43%	846	5.04%
Countryside	City	6,420	4,410	68.69%	166	2.59%	4	0.06%	145	2.26%	1	0.02%	20	0.31%	133	2.07%	1,541	24.00%
Crestwood	Village	10,826	7,710	71.22%	1,084	10.01%	2	0.02%	186	1.72%	0	0.00%	30	0.28%	266	2.46%	1,548	14.30%
Deer Park ‡	Village	3,681	3,119	84.73%	23	0.62%	6	0.16%	288	7.82%	0	0.00%	5	0.14%	266	7.23%	122	3.31%
Deerfield ‡	Village	19,196	16,649	86.73%	131	0.68%	7	0.04%	1,015	5.29%	1	0.01%	47	0.24%	266	1.39%	794	4.14%
Des Plaines	City	60,675	35,977	59.29%	1,385	2.28%	41	0.07%	9,153	15.09%	8	0.01%	205	0.34%	1,449	2.39%	12,457	20.53%
Dixmoor	Village	2,973	310	10.43%	1,485	49.95%	8	0.27%	18	0.61%	2	0.07%	11	0.37%	49	1.65%	1,090	36.66%
Dolton	Village	21,426	598	2.79%	19,322	90.18%	19	0.09%	38	0.18%	1	0.00%	107	0.50%	404	1.89%	937	4.37%
East Dundee ‡	Village	3,152	2,241	71.10%	177	5.62%	0	0.00%	74	2.35%	0	0.00%	4	0.13%	404	12.82%	570	18.08%
East Hazel Crest	Village	1,297	291	22.44%	748	57.67%	0	0.00%	4	0.31%	0	0.00%	6	0.46%	39	3.01%	209	16.11%
Elgin	City	114,797	42,261	36.81%	7,207	6.28%	150	0.13%	7,285	6.35%	27	0.02%	392	0.34%	3,015	2.63%	54,460	47.44%
Elk Grove Village ‡	Village	32,812	23,320	71.07%	599	1.83%	39	0.12%	3,919	11.94%	4	0.01%	80	0.24%	862	2.63%	3,989	12.16%
Elmhurst	City	45,786	35,971	78.56%	931	2.03%	41	0.09%	2,942	6.43%	7	0.02%	148	0.32%	1,477	3.23%	4,269	9.32%
Elmwood Park	Village	24,521	14,075	57.40%	658	2.68%	24	0.10%	732	2.99%	7	0.03%	51	0.21%	375	1.53%	8,599	35.07%
Evanston	City	78,110	44,534	57.01%	12,329	15.78%	99	0.13%	7,701	9.86%	25	0.03%	479	0.61%	4,165	5.33%	8,778	11.24%
Evergreen Park	Village	19,943	10,899	54.65%	4,775	23.94%	22	0.11%	232	1.16%	8	0.04%	95	0.48%	501	2.51%	3,411	17.10%
Flossmoor	Village	9,704	2,958	30.48%	5,645	58.17%	9	0.09%	187	1.93%	4	0.04%	41	0.42%	398	4.10%	462	4.76%
Ford Heights	Village	1,813	44	2.43%	1,651	91.06%	7	0.39%	4	0.22%	0	0.00%	3	0.17%	37	2.04%	67	3.70%
Forest Park	Village	14,339	6,756	47.12%	4,345	30.30%	26	0.18%	879	6.13%	3	0.02%	113	0.79%	594	4.14%	1,623	11.32%
Forest View	Village	792	359	45.33%	16	2.02%	0	0.00%	12	1.52%	0	0.00%	0	0.00%	18	2.27%	387	48.86%
Frankfort ‡	Village	20,296	16,168	79.66%	1,738	8.56%	9	0.04%	659	3.25%	1	0.00%	41	0.20%	589	2.90%	1,091	5.38%
Franklin Park	Village	18,467	7,530	40.78%	242	1.31%	18	0.10%	705	3.82%	2	0.01%	70	0.38%	268	1.45%	9,632	52.16%
Glencoe	Village	8,849	7,635	86.28%	92	1.04%	8	0.09%	377	4.26%	0	0.00%	38	0.43%	327	3.70%	372	4.20%
Glenview	Village	48,705	34,589	71.02%	519	1.07%	37	0.08%	8,042	16.51%	9	0.02%	250	0.51%	1,664	3.42%	3,595	7.38%
Glenwood	Village	8,662	1,240	14.32%	6,457	74.54%	4	0.05%	9	0.10%	3	0.03%	30	0.35%	201	2.32%	718	8.29%
Golf	Village	514	428	83.27%	7	1.36%	0	0.00%	29	5.64%	0	0.00%	3	0.58%	12	2.33%	35	6.81%
Hanover Park ‡	Village	37,470	11,885	31.72%	2,537	6.77%	59	0.16%	6,326	16.88%	20	0.05%	158	0.42%	924	2.47%	15,561	41.53%
Harvey	City	20,324	591	2.91%	12,729	62.63%	25	0.12%	490	2.41%	8	0.04%	91	0.45%	350	1.72%	6,040	29.72%
Harwood Heights	Village	9,065	6,483	71.52%	66	0.73%	12	0.13%	861	9.50%	0	0.00%	13	0.14%	171	1.89%	1,459	16.09%
Hazel Crest	Village	13,382	758	5.66%	11,441	85.50%	17	0.13%	49	0.37%	3	0.02%	68	0.51%	304	2.27%	742	5.54%
Hickory Hills	City	14,505	10,947	75.47%	462	3.19%	10	0.07%	389	2.68%	0	0.00%	39	0.27%	329	2.27%	2,329	16.06%
Hillside	Village	8,320	1,414	17.00%	3,519	42.30%	10	0.12%	253	3.04%	2	0.02%	35	0.42%	129	1.55%	2,958	35.55%
Hinsdale ‡	Village	17,395	13,226	76.03%	282	1.62%	15	0.09%	2,161	12.42%	4	0.02%	54	0.31%	129	0.74%	948	5.45%
Hodgkins	Village	1,500	753	50.20%	17	1.13%	3	0.20%	21	1.40%	0	0.00%	0	0.00%	44	2.93%	662	44.13%
Hoffman Estates	Village	52,530	26,014	49.52%	2,472	4.71%	69	0.13%	13,733	26.14%	2	0.00%	183	0.35%	1,579	3.01%	8,478	16.14%
Homer Glen ‡	Village	24,543	21,750	88.62%	198	0.81%	12	0.05%	406	1.65%	1	0.00%	31	0.13%	575	2.34%	1,570	6.40%
Hometown	City	4,343	2,979	68.59%	86	1.98%	7	0.16%	38	0.87%	2	0.05%	16	0.37%	97	2.23%	1,118	25.74%
Homewood	Village	19,463	8,064	41.43%	8,657	44.48%	16	0.08%	251	1.29%	0	0.00%	91	0.47%	758	3.89%	1,626	8.35%
Indian Head Park	Village	4,065	3,481	85.63%	102	2.51%	4	0.10%	129	3.17%	0	0.00%	7	0.17%	61	1.50%	281	6.91%
Inverness	Village	7,616	5,867	77.04%	39	0.51%	1	0.01%	1,207	15.85%	3	0.04%	32	0.42%	205	2.69%	262	3.44%
Justice	Village	12,600	7,442	59.06%	2,516	19.97%	18	0.14%	224	1.78%	0	0.00%	29	0.23%	294	2.33%	2,077	16.48%
Kenilworth	Village	2,514	2,207	87.79%	8	0.32%	2	0.08%	105	4.18%	0	0.00%	12	0.48%	77	3.06%	103	4.10%
La Grange	Village	16,321	13,420	82.23%	585	3.58%	7	0.04%	274	1.68%	0	0.00%	32	0.20%	582	3.57%	1,421	8.71%
La Grange Park	Village	13,475	10,558	78.35%	566	4.20%	13	0.10%	316	2.35%	2	0.01%	31	0.23%	399	2.96%	1,590	11.80%
Lansing	Village	29,076	8,462	29.10%	13,421	46.16%	26	0.09%	264	0.91%	4	0.01%	172	0.59%	734	2.52%	5,993	20.61%
Lemont ‡	Village	17,629	15,370	87.19%	147	0.83%	2	0.01%	422	2.39%	6	0.03%	23	0.13%	404	2.29%	1,255	7.12%
Lincolnwood	Village	13,463	7,682	57.06%	248	1.84%	7	0.05%	4,164	30.93%	1	0.01%	45	0.33%	323	2.40%	993	7.38%
Lynwood	Village	9,116	1,187	13.02%	6,869	75.35%	12	0.13%	41	0.45%	1	0.01%	25	0.27%	229	2.51%	752	8.25%
Lyons	Village	10,817	4,458	41.21%	464	4.29%	15	0.14%	179	1.65%	1	0.01%	43	0.40%	269	2.49%	5,388	49.81%
Markham	Village	11,661	823	7.06%	8,420	72.21%	11	0.09%	103	0.88%	0	0.00%	32	0.27%	258	2.21%	2,014	17.27%
Matteson	Village	19,073	1,831	9.60%	15,641	82.01%	19	0.10%	185	0.97%	2	0.01%	97	0.51%	495	2.60%	803	4.21%
Maywood	Village	23,512	722	3.07%	14,193	60.36%	19	0.08%	110	0.47%	4	0.02%	61	0.26%	401	1.71%	8,002	34.03%
McCook	Village	249	141	56.63%	0	0.00%	0	0.00%	3	1.20%	0	0.00%	3	1.20%	11	4.42%	91	36.55%
Melrose Park	Village	24,796	4,292	17.31%	1,442	5.82%	11	0.04%	308	1.24%	3	0.01%	55	0.22%	166	0.67%	18,519	74.69%
Merrionette Park	Village	1,969	1,153	58.56%	347	17.62%	4	0.20%	21	1.07%	0	0.00%	6	0.30%	59	3.00%	379	19.25%
Midlothian	Village	14,325	7,107	49.61%	1,880	13.12%	11	0.08%	196	1.37%	3	0.02%	41	0.29%	482	3.36%	4,605	32.15%
Morton Grove	Village	25,297	13,359	52.81%	474	1.87%	34	0.13%	8,540	33.76%	2	0.01%	71	0.28%	776	3.07%	2,041	8.07%
Mount Prospect	Village	56,852	36,463	64.14%	1,459	2.57%	30	0.05%	8,192	14.41%	15	0.03%	169	0.30%	776	1.36%	9,186	16.16%
Niles	Village	30,912	20,200	65.35%	500	1.62%	12	0.04%	6,040	19.54%	2	0.01%	74	0.24%	637	2.06%	3,447	11.15%
Norridge	Village	15,251	12,234	80.22%	60	0.39%	2	0.01%	910	5.97%	7	0.05%	41	0.27%	207	1.36%	1,790	11.74%
North Riverside	Village	7,426	3,810	51.31%	513	6.91%	15	0.20%	219	2.95%	0	0.00%	24	0.32%	158	2.13%	2,687	36.18%
Northbrook	Village	35,222	26,998	76.65%	257	0.73%	16	0.05%	5,746	16.31%	2	0.01%	79	0.22%	922	2.62%	1,202	3.41%
Northfield	Village	5,751	4,706	81.83%	25	0.43%	1	0.02%	529	9.20%	0	0.00%	7	0.12%	205	3.56%	278	4.83%
Northlake	Village	12,840	3,895	30.33%	430	3.35%	6	0.05%	361	2.81%	0	0.00%	29	0.23%	197	1.53%	7,922	61.70%
Oak Brook ‡	Village	8,163	4,648	56.94%	149	1.83%	5	0.06%	2,678	32.81%	2	0.02%	40	0.49%	245	3.00%	396	4.85%
Oak Forest	City	27,478	18,606	67.71%	2,012	7.32%	67	0.24%	1,313	4.78%	3	0.01%	121	0.44%	815	2.97%	4,541	16.53%
Oak Lawn	Village	58,362	37,499	64.25%	4,335	7.43%	84	0.14%	1,630	2.79%	6	0.01%	204	0.35%	1,437	2.46%	13,167	22.56%
Oak Park	Village	54,583	32,846	60.18%	10,200	18.69%	29	0.05%	2,944	5.39%	12	0.02%	285	0.52%	3,187	5.84%	5,080	9.31%
Olympia Fields	Village	4,718	705	14.94%	3,648	77.32%	2	0.04%	67	1.42%	0	0.00%	34	0.72%	115	2.44%	147	3.12%
Orland Hills	Village	6,893	4,897	71.04%	604	8.76%	4	0.06%	336	4.87%	0	0.00%	15	0.22%	183	2.65%	854	12.39%
Orland Park ‡	Village	58,703	47,336	80.64%	1,984	3.38%	43	0.07%	3,132	5.34%	5	0.01%	170	0.29%	1,373	2.34%	4,660	7.94%
Palatine	Village	67,908	41,673	61.37%	2,024	2.98%	58	0.09%	8,754	12.89%	14	0.02%	217	0.32%	1,863	2.74%	13,305	19.59%
Palos Heights	City	12,068	10,734	88.95%	196	1.62%	4	0.03%	224	1.86%	0	0.00%	29	0.24%	235	1.95%	646	5.35%
Palos Hills	City	18,530	14,729	79.49%	1,040	5.61%	9	0.05%	392	2.12%	0	0.00%	85	0.46%	386	2.08%	1,889	10.19%
Palos Park	Village	4,899	4,247	86.69%	69	1.41%	0	0.00%	102	2.08%	0	0.00%	23	0.47%	112	2.29%	346	7.06%
Park Forest ‡	Village	21,687	3,828	17.65%	15,022	69.27%	25	0.12%	150	0.69%	9	0.04%	131	0.60%	840	3.87%	1,682	7.76%
Park Ridge	City	39,656	33,444	84.34%	204	0.51%	16	0.04%	1,913	4.82%	3	0.01%	128	0.32%	1,093	2.76%	2,855	7.20%
Phoenix	Village	1,708	14	0.82%	1,445	84.60%	7	0.41%	4	0.23%	2	0.12%	13	0.76%	19	1.11%	204	11.94%
Posen	Village	5,632	1,120	19.89%	916	16.26%	6	0.11%	31	0.55%	0	0.00%	11	0.20%	90	1.60%	3,458	61.40%
Prospect Heights	City	16,058	9,210	57.35%	215	1.34%	24	0.15%	1,641	10.22%	2	0.01%	38	0.24%	273	1.70%	4,655	28.99%
Richton Park	Village	12,775	804	6.29%	10,988	86.01%	21	0.16%	94	0.74%	1	0.01%	34	0.27%	291	2.28%	542	4.24%
River Forest	Village	11,717	8,308	70.91%	869	7.42%	9	0.08%	932	7.95%	0	0.00%	93	0.79%	515	4.40%	991	8.46%
River Grove	Village	10,612	6,609	62.28%	202	1.90%	3	0.03%	232	2.19%	1	0.01%	34	0.32%	184	1.73%	3,347	31.54%
Riverdale	Village	10,663	301	2.82%	9,791	91.82%	11	0.10%	13	0.12%	7	0.07%	40	0.38%	160	1.50%	340	3.19%
Riverside	Village	9,298	7,074	76.08%	161	1.73%	4	0.04%	200	2.15%	0	0.00%	41	0.44%	298	3.20%	1,520	16.35%
Robbins	Village	4,629	240	5.18%	3,908	84.42%	2	0.04%	10	0.22%	0	0.00%	20	0.43%	103	2.23%	346	7.47%
Rolling Meadows	City	24,200	13,528	55.90%	637	2.63%	8	0.03%	3,147	13.00%	13	0.05%	60	0.25%	694	2.87%	6,113	25.26%
Roselle ‡	Village	22,897	16,551	72.28%	557	2.43%	21	0.09%	2,422	10.58%	9	0.04%	80	0.35%	648	2.83%	2,609	11.39%
Rosemont	Village	3,952	1,994	50.46%	101	2.56%	0	0.00%	196	4.96%	0	0.00%	8	0.20%	92	2.33%	1,561	39.50%
Sauk Village ‡	Village	9,921	1,436	14.47%	6,674	67.27%	8	0.08%	41	0.41%	3	0.03%	67	0.68%	364	3.67%	1,328	13.39%
Schaumburg ‡	Village	78,723	43,739	55.56%	3,266	4.15%	105	0.13%	20,767	26.38%	11	0.01%	268	0.34%	2,304	2.93%	8,263	10.50%
Schiller Park	Village	11,709	6,892	58.86%	164	1.40%	11	0.09%	803	6.86%	0	0.00%	22	0.19%	188	1.61%	3,629	30.99%
Skokie	Village	67,824	33,697	49.68%	5,256	7.75%	56	0.08%	18,726	27.61%	23	0.03%	424	0.63%	2,457	3.62%	7,185	10.59%
South Barrington	Village	5,077	2,672	52.63%	39	0.77%	2	0.04%	2,041	40.20%	0	0.00%	3	0.06%	159	3.13%	161	3.17%
South Chicago Heights	Village	4,026	1,270	31.54%	671	16.67%	5	0.12%	65	1.61%	2	0.05%	9	0.22%	104	2.58%	1,900	47.19%
South Holland	Village	21,465	2,094	9.76%	17,277	80.49%	24	0.11%	87	0.41%	1	0.00%	87	0.41%	478	2.23%	1,417	6.60%
Steger ‡	Village	9,584	4,536	47.33%	2,481	25.89%	12	0.13%	74	0.77%	2	0.02%	56	0.58%	388	4.05%	2,035	21.23%
Stickney	Village	7,110	2,111	29.69%	168	2.36%	11	0.15%	91	1.28%	1	0.01%	38	0.53%	122	1.72%	4,568	64.25%
Stone Park	Village	4,576	280	6.12%	134	2.93%	3	0.07%	44	0.96%	0	0.00%	6	0.13%	22	0.48%	4,087	89.31%
Streamwood	Village	39,577	16,563	41.85%	2,251	5.69%	29	0.07%	6,291	15.90%	4	0.01%	111	0.28%	963	2.43%	13,365	33.77%
Summit	Village	11,161	1,791	16.05%	852	7.63%	21	0.19%	222	1.99%	3	0.03%	37	0.33%	115	1.03%	8,120	72.75%
Thornton	Village	2,386	1,325	55.53%	528	22.13%	3	0.13%	9	0.38%	0	0.00%	8	0.34%	71	2.98%	442	18.52%
Tinley Park ‡	Village	55,971	43,852	78.35%	3,540	6.32%	7	0.01%	2,345	4.19%	5	0.01%	129	0.23%	1,397	2.50%	4,696	8.39%
University Park ‡	Village	7,145	346	4.84%	6,199	86.76%	14	0.20%	18	0.25%	0	0.00%	49	0.69%	230	3.22%	289	4.04%
Westchester	Village	16,892	8,877	52.55%	3,311	19.60%	14	0.08%	687	4.07%	2	0.01%	55	0.33%	396	2.34%	3,550	21.02%
Western Springs	Village	13,629	12,309	90.31%	57	0.42%	3	0.02%	246	1.80%	1	0.01%	27	0.20%	362	2.66%	624	4.58%
Wheeling	Village	39,137	17,805	45.49%	885	2.26%	22	0.06%	6,506	16.62%	6	0.02%	172	0.44%	694	1.77%	13,047	33.34%
Willow Springs ‡	Village	5,857	4,679	79.89%	77	1.31%	15	0.26%	202	3.45%	0	0.00%	15	0.26%	154	2.63%	715	12.21%
Wilmette	Village	28,170	21,879	77.67%	232	0.82%	12	0.04%	3,297	11.70%	4	0.01%	123	0.44%	1,233	4.38%	1,390	4.93%
Winnetka	Village	12,744	11,257	88.33%	29	0.23%	4	0.03%	444	3.48%	3	0.02%	47	0.37%	449	3.52%	511	4.01%
Woodridge ‡	Village	34,158	19,880	58.20%	3,346	9.80%	41	0.12%	4,519	13.23%	15	0.04%	150	0.44%	1,152	3.37%	5,055	14.80%
Worth	Village	10,970	8,138	74.18%	466	4.25%	5	0.05%	242	2.21%	4	0.04%	63	0.57%	344	3.14%	1,708	15.57%

2000 census age pyramid for Cook County

=== 2010 census ===
As of the 2010 Census, the population of the county was 5,194,675, White Americans made up 55.4% of Cook County's population; non-Hispanic whites represented 43.9% of the population. African Americans made up 24.8% of the population. Native Americans made up 0.4% of Cook County's population. Asian Americans made up 6.2% of the population (1.8% Indian, 1.2% Filipino, 1.2% Chinese, 0.7% Korean, 0.3% Vietnamese, 0.2% Japanese, 0.8% Other). Pacific Islander Americans made up less than 0.1% of the population. People from other races made up 10.6% of the population; people from two or more races made up 2.5% of the county's population. Hispanics and Latinos (of any race) made up 24.0% of Cook County's population.

=== 2000 census ===
According to the 2000 Census there were 1,974,181 households, out of which 30.9% had children under the age of 18 living with them, 44.0% were married couples living together, 15.6% had a female householder with no husband present, and 35.7% were non-families. 29.4% of all households were someone living alone including 9.3% who were 65 years of age or older. The average household size was 2.68 and the average family size was 3.38.

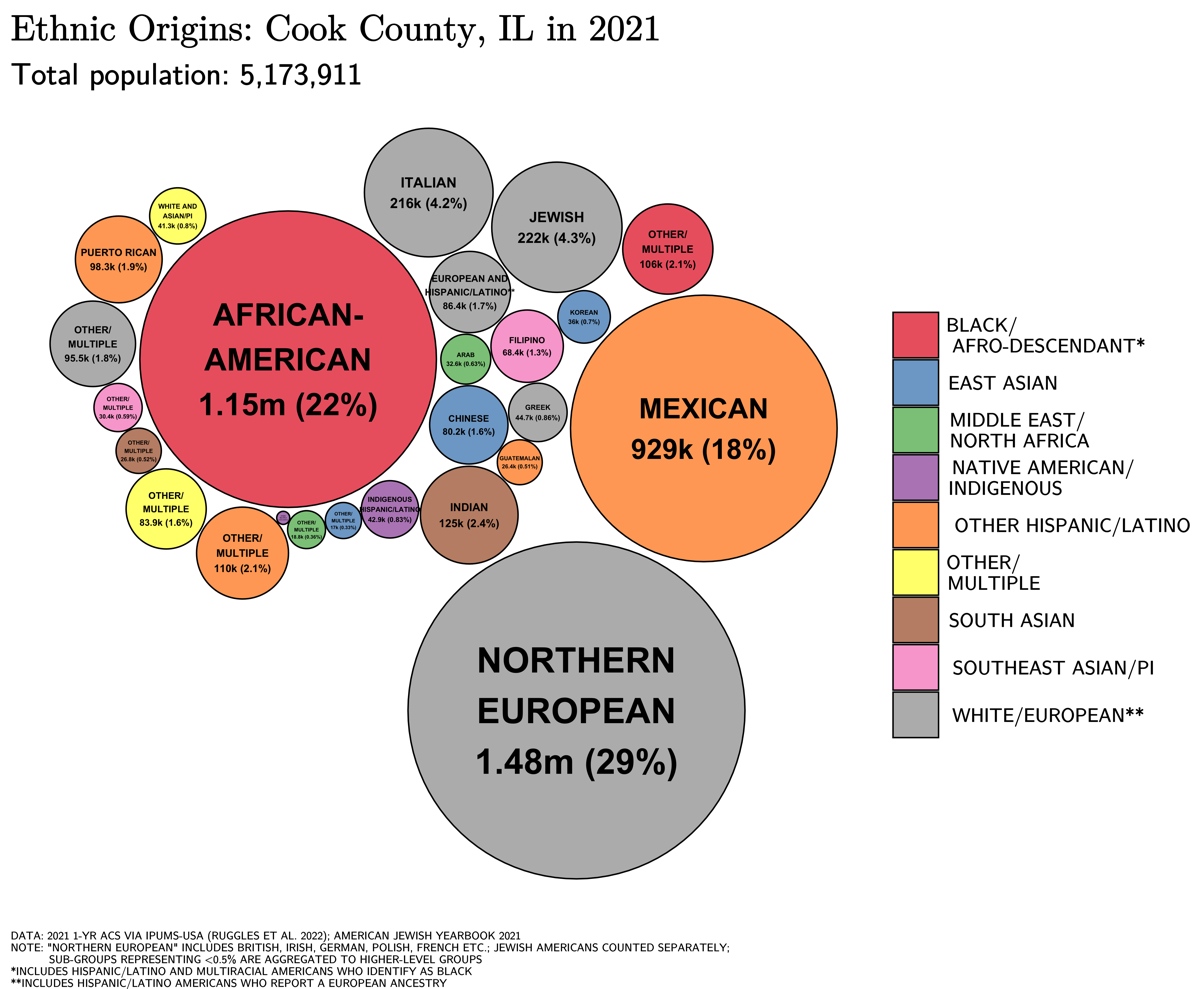
Ethnic origins in Cook County

In the county, the population age distribution was: 26.0% under the age of 18, 9.9% from 18 to 24, 31.7% from 25 to 44, 20.7% from 45 to 64, and 11.7% who were 65 years of age or older. The median age was 34 years. For every 100 females, there were 93.9 males. For every 100 females age 18 and over, there were 90.5 males.

The median income for a household in the county was $45,922, and the median income for a family was $53,784. Males had a median income of $40,690 versus $31,298 for females. The per capita income for the county was $23,227. About 10.6% of families and 13.5% of the population were below the poverty line, including 18.9% of those under age 18 and 10.3% of those age 65 or over.

As of the fourth quarter of 2021, the median home value in Cook County was $299,571, an increase of 11.7% from the prior year.

According to Census Bureau estimates, the county's population grew by 5.3% from 1990 to 2000, decreased by 3.4% between the 2000 census and the 2010 census, and increased 1.6% between 2010 and 2020.

As of the 2000 Census, there were 5,376,741 people, 1,974,181 households, and 1,269,398 families residing in the county. The population density was 5,686 inhabitants per square mile (2,195/km^{2}). There were 2,096,121 housing units at an average density of 2,216 per square mile (856/km^{2}). The racial makeup of the county was 56.27% white, 26.14% Black or African American, 0.29% Native American, 4.84% Asian, 0.05% Pacific Islanders, 9.88% from other races, and 2.53% from two or more races. 19.93% of the population were Hispanic or Latino of any race. 9.1% were of Polish, 8.1% German, 7.9% Irish and 5.7% Italian ancestry. 17.63% reported speaking Spanish at home; 3.13% speak Polish.

Whites (Hispanic and non-Hispanic) number roughly 2,793,500. There are about 2,372,500 non-Hispanic whites residing in Cook County. Sizeable non-Hispanic white populations are those of German (11.4%), Irish (10.3%), Polish (9.7%), Italian (6.1%), and British (4.1%) descent. There are also significant groups of Swedish (1.5%), Russian (1.5%), French (1.3%), Greek (1.2%), Czech (1.0%), Dutch (1.0%), Lithuanian (0.9%), and Norwegian (0.8%) descent.

Cook County has more Black residents than any county in the United States. Black Americans are the second largest racial group in the county, accounting for slightly over one-quarter (25.4%) of Cook County's population. Blacks of non-Hispanic origin form 25.2% of the population; black Hispanics make up the remaining 0.2% of the populace. There are roughly 1,341,000 African Americans of both Hispanic and non-Hispanic origin living in Cook County; 1,328,000 are non-Hispanic blacks. Roughly 52,500 people were of Sub-Saharan African ancestry, making up 1.0% of the total population.

Approximately 10,300 residents of Cook County are of Native American ancestry. They consist of Cherokee, Chippewa, Navajo, and Sioux. Native Americans of Hispanic origin represent a sizeable portion of the Native American population. Nearly 6,000 Native Americans are of non-Hispanic origin, and some 4,300 are of Hispanic origin. Over 40% of the Native American racial group is of Hispanic descent.

Non-English speakers in Cook County

Asian Americans are a very sizeable racial group in the county, numbering about 301,000. The Asian population is ethnically diverse, and includes roughly 87,900 Indians, 61,700 Filipinos, 60,700 Chinese, 35,000 Koreans, 13,700 Vietnamese, and 11,100 Japanese. Roughly 30,800 are of other Asian ethnic groups, such as Thai, Cambodian, and Hmong.

Approximately 3,000 residents are of Pacific Islander heritage. This group includes roughly Native Hawaiians, Guamanians, Samoans, and various people of other Pacific Islander groups.

Hispanic and Latino Americans make up over one-fifth (22.8%) of Cook County's population. Roughly 1,204,000 Latinos live in the county. Mexicans are the most common Latino group. Cook County's 925,000 Mexican Americans make up 17.5% of its population. Roughly 127,000 Puerto Ricans live in the county, while over 12,200 Cubans reside in the county. There are some 140,000 Hispanics and Latinos of other nationalities living in Cook County (i.e. Colombian, Bolivian, etc.), and they collectively make up 2.6% of the county's population.

=== Religion ===
In 2010 statistics, the largest religious group in Cook County was the Archdiocese of Chicago, with 1,947,223 Catholics worshipping at 371 parishes, followed by 209,195 non-denominational adherents with 486 congregations, an estimated 201,152 Muslims with 62 congregations, 68,865 NBC Baptists with 99 congregations, 49,925 ELCA Lutherans with 145 congregations, 49,909 SBC Baptists with 181 congregations, 45,979 LCMS Lutherans with 120 congregations, 39,866 UCC Christians with 101 congregations, 33,584 UMC Methodists with 121 congregations, and 32,646 AG Pentecostals with 64 congregations. Altogether, 59.6% of the population was claimed as members by religious congregations, although members of historically African-American denominations were underrepresented due to incomplete information. In 2014, Cook County had 2,001 religious organizations, second only to Los Angeles County out of all US counties.

== Geography ==
Chicago, Illinois

Climate chart (precipitation, max. and min. temperature)
J	F	M	A	M	J	J	A	S	O	N	D
2.2 32 18	1.8 38 24	3 47 32	3.7 59 42	3.7 70 51	4.3 80 61	3.7 84 66	3.9 83 65	3.2 76 57	2.7 64 46	3.3 49 35	2.6 37 24
- █ Average max. and min. temperatures in °F
- █ Precipitation totals in inches
- Source: The Weather Channel
Metric conversion
J	F	M	A	M	J	J	A	S	O	N	D
55 0 −8	45 3 −4	76 8 0	93 15 6	94 21 11	109 27 16	93 29 19	98 28 18	82 24 14	69 18 8	84 9 2	67 3 −4
- █ Average max. and min. temperatures in °C
- █ Precipitation totals in mm

According to the U.S. Census Bureau, the county has a total area of 1,635 square miles (4,230 km^{2}), of which 945 square miles (2,450 km^{2}) is land and 690 square miles (1,800 km^{2}) (42.2%) is water. It is the sixth largest county in Illinois by land area, and the largest in total area. Most of the water is in Lake Michigan. The highest point is more than 950 feet (290 m), and is in northwest Barrington Township, in the northwest corner of the county. The lowest point is less than 580 feet (180 m), along the Lake Michigan shoreline.

=== Climate and weather ===
In July, temperatures in Chicago, Cook County average daytime highs of 84 °F (29 °C), and nighttime lows of 68 °F (20 °C); and January daytime highs of 31 °F (−1 °C), and nighttime lows of 18 °F (−8 °C). Winter temperatures will sometimes veer above 40 °F (4 °C), and, although not common, have also risen over 50 °F (10 °C) on some winter days. Average monthly precipitation ranged from 4.30 inches (109 mm) in June to 1.77 inches (45 mm) in February.

=== National protected areas ===
- Chicago Portage National Historic Site
- Pullman National Monument

== Government and politics ==
=== Government ===
The government of Cook County is primarily composed of the Board of Commissioners headed by the President of the County Board, other elected officials such as the Sheriff, State's Attorney, Treasurer, Board of Review, Clerk, Assessor, Recorder, Circuit Court judges, and Circuit Court Clerk, as well as numerous other officers and entities. Cook County is the only home rule county in Illinois. The Cook County Code is the codification of Cook County's local ordinances. Cook County's current County Board president is Toni Preckwinkle.

The Circuit Court of Cook County, which is an Illinois state court of general jurisdiction is funded, in part, by Cook County, and accepts more than 1.2 million cases each year for filing. The Cook County Department of Corrections, also known as the Cook County Jail, is the largest single-site jail in the nation. The Cook County Juvenile Detention Center, under the authority of the Chief Judge of the court, is the first juvenile center in the nation and one of the largest in the nation. The Cook County Law Library is the second-largest county law library in the nation.

The Bureau of Health Services administers the county's public health services and is the third-largest public health system in the nation. Three hospitals are part of this system: John H. Stroger, Jr. Hospital of Cook County, Provident Hospital, and Oak Forest Hospital of Cook County, along with over 30 clinics.

The Cook County Department of Transportation is responsible for the design and maintenance of roadways in the county. These thoroughfares are composed mostly of major and minor arterials, with a few local roads. Although the County Department of Transportation was instrumental in designing many of the expressways in the county, today they are under the jurisdiction of the state.

The Cook County Forest Preserves, organized in 1915, is a separate, independent taxing body, but the Cook County Board of Commissioners also acts as its Board of Commissioners. The district is a belt of 69,000 acres (280 km^{2}) of forest reservations surrounding the city of Chicago. The Brookfield Zoo (managed by the Chicago Zoological Society) and the Chicago Botanic Garden (managed by the Chicago Horticultural Society) are located in the forest preserves.

Cook County is the fifth-largest employer in Chicago.

In March 2008, the County Board increased the sales tax by one percent to 1.75 percent. This followed a quarter-cent increase in mass transit taxes. In Chicago, the rate increased to 10.25 percent, the steepest nominal rate of any major metropolitan area in America. In Evanston, sales tax reached 10 percent and Oak Lawn residents pay 9.5 percent. On July 22, 2008, the Cook County board voted against Cook County Commissioner's proposal to repeal the tax increase.

In 2016, Cook County joined Chicago in adopting a $13 hourly minimum wage. Cook County Board chairman John Daley called the wage hike "the moral and right thing to do." In June 2017, however, nearly 75 home rule municipalities passed measures opting themselves out of the increase.

=== Politics ===
Cook County has more Democratic Party members than any other Illinois county and it is one of the most Democratic counties in the United States. Since 1932, the majority of its voters have only supported a Republican candidate in a Presidential election three times, all during national Republican landslides–Dwight Eisenhower over native son Adlai Stevenson II in 1952 and 1956, and Richard Nixon over George McGovern in 1972. In 1984, Walter Mondale won Cook County with 51% of its vote despite losing in a landslide nationally to native Illinoisan Ronald Reagan. In 2020, 74 percent of the county voted for Joe Biden and 24 percent voted for Donald Trump.

In 1936, with Franklin D. Roosevelt receiving 1,253,164 votes in the county, Cook County became the first county in American history where a candidate received one million votes.

The Cook County Democratic Party represents Democratic voters in 50 wards in the city of Chicago and 30 suburban townships of Cook County. The organization has dominated County, city, and state politics since the 1930s. The last Republican mayor of Chicago was William Hale "Big Bill" Thompson, who left office in 1931 with a record of corruption. The most successful Republican candidate for mayor since then was Bernard Epton, who in 1983 came within 3.3 percentage points of defeating Democrat Harold Washington. The county's Republican Party organization is the Cook County Republican Party.

The last Republican governor to carry the county was Jim Edgar in his 1994 landslide. The last Republican senator to do so was Charles H. Percy in 1978.

United States presidential election results for Cook County, Illinois
Year	Republican / Whig		Democratic		Third party(ies)	
Year	No.	%	No.	%	No.	%
1844	1,119	35.58%	2,026	64.42%	0	0.00%
1892	111,254	42.57%	144,604	55.33%	5,472	2.09%
1896	221,823	58.43%	152,146	40.08%	5,639	1.49%
1900	203,760	50.80%	186,193	46.42%	11,181	2.79%
1904	229,848	58.49%	103,762	26.41%	59,335	15.10%
1908	230,400	55.51%	152,990	36.86%	31,701	7.64%
1912	74,851	17.44%	130,702	30.44%	223,759	52.12%
1916	435,695	51.20%	379,438	44.59%	35,830	4.21%
1920	635,197	71.12%	197,499	22.11%	60,441	6.77%
1924	688,973	61.87%	226,141	20.31%	198,538	17.83%
1928	812,063	52.73%	716,283	46.51%	11,825	0.77%
1932	690,146	41.47%	919,231	55.23%	54,855	3.30%
1936	701,206	34.90%	1,253,164	62.36%	55,087	2.74%
1940	938,454	44.38%	1,168,141	55.24%	8,212	0.39%
1944	924,659	41.91%	1,275,367	57.81%	6,165	0.28%
1948	1,015,800	45.23%	1,216,636	54.17%	13,463	0.60%
1952	1,188,973	50.21%	1,172,454	49.51%	6,512	0.28%
1956	1,293,223	56.80%	977,821	42.95%	5,800	0.25%
1960	1,059,607	43.33%	1,378,343	56.37%	7,319	0.30%
1964	895,718	36.82%	1,537,181	63.18%	0	0.00%
1968	960,493	41.11%	1,181,316	50.56%	194,729	8.33%
1972	1,234,307	53.41%	1,063,268	46.01%	13,462	0.58%
1976	987,498	44.69%	1,180,814	53.44%	41,436	1.88%
1980	856,574	39.60%	1,124,584	51.99%	181,939	8.41%
1984	1,055,558	48.40%	1,112,641	51.02%	12,536	0.57%
1988	878,582	43.36%	1,129,973	55.77%	17,589	0.87%
1992	605,300	28.20%	1,249,533	58.21%	291,822	13.59%
1996	461,557	26.73%	1,153,289	66.79%	111,820	6.48%
2000	534,542	28.65%	1,280,547	68.63%	50,818	2.72%
2004	597,405	29.15%	1,439,724	70.25%	12,305	0.60%
2008	487,736	22.82%	1,629,024	76.21%	20,706	0.97%
2012	495,542	24.59%	1,488,537	73.88%	30,740	1.53%
2016	453,287	20.79%	1,611,946	73.93%	115,111	5.28%
2020	558,269	24.01%	1,725,973	74.22%	41,163	1.77%
2024	583,852	28.08%	1,447,821	69.63%	47,566	2.29%

=== Secession movements ===
To establish more localized government control and policies which reflect the often different values and needs of large suburban sections of the sprawling county, secession movements have been made over the years which called for certain townships or municipalities to form their own independent counties.

In the late 1970s, a movement started which proposed a separation of six northwest suburban townships, Cook County's panhandle (Barrington, Hanover, Palatine, Wheeling, Schaumburg, and Elk Grove) from Cook to form Lincoln County, in honor of the former U.S. president and Illinois resident. It is likely that Arlington Heights would have been the county seat. This northwest suburban region of Cook was at the time moderately conservative and has a population over 500,000. Local legislators, led by State Senator Dave Regnar, went so far as to propose it as official legislation in the Illinois House. The legislation died, however, before coming to a vote.

In 2004, Blue Island mayor Donald E. Peloquin organized a coalition of fifty-five south and southwest suburban municipalities to form a new county, also proposing the name Lincoln County. The county would include everything south of Burbank, stretching as far west as Orland Park, as far east as Calumet City, and as far south as Matteson, covering an expansive area with a population of over one million residents. Peloquin argued that the south suburbs are often shunned by the city (although Chicago is not bound or required to do anything for other municipalities) and he blamed the Chicago-centric policies of Cook County for failing to jumpstart the somewhat-depressed south suburban local economy. Pending sufficient interest from local communities, Peloquin planned a petition drive to place a question regarding the secession on the general election ballot, but the idea was not met with success.

In arguing against the Lincoln County proposal, others noted several of the cities involved had power structures, law enforcement, or de facto "mayors for life" often accused in the press, or civilly or criminally charged with, political corruption, cronyism, and nepotism, and themselves being the main factor in their depressed economies rather than anyone in Cook County government. The opposition decried that their true reason for joining the secession effort was to start with a 'clean slate' with a new county government by design less willing to enforce responsibility against their abuses of power.

Talk of secession from Cook County amongst some outlying communities again heated up in mid-2008 in response to a highly controversial 1% sales tax hike which has pushed the tax rates across the county communities up amongst the highest in the nation. Some border towns in particular had been outraged, as people can take their business across the county border (paying, for instance, 7% in Lake County instead of Palatine's 9.5%). The secession issue eventually died down from the nominal tax increase.

In 2011, two downstate Republican state representatives, Bill Mitchell of the 87th district and Adam Brown of the 101st district, proposed statehood for Cook County. Mitchell said that Chicago is "dictating its views" to the rest of the state and Brown added that Chicago "overshadows" the rest of Illinois.

== Infrastructure ==
=== Canals ===
Construction of the Erie Canal in New York State made a connection from the Atlantic Ocean to the Great Lakes in 1821. As the Midwest farms proved productive, with much grain to sell to other parts of the US, Chicago and Cook County saw the benefit of a canal to improve the link from the Great Lakes to the Mississippi River. The Illinois and Michigan Canal was completed in 1848, extending from the Bridgeport neighborhood in Chicago on the Chicago River, to the Illinois River at the cities of LaSalle-Peru. This canal spurred the growth of Chicago and the areas around it, as water travel was the primary way to ship grain or other commodities in that part of the 19th century. The Illinois and Michigan Canal ceased major operation in 1933. Portions are now designated as a National Historic Corridor. The two canals and the Great Lakes cemented trade ties between the Midwest and the Northeast, encouraging farmers to grow more than they needed to feed themselves in Illinois, with a large market for grain now open to them. Towns in Cook County along the Canal grew. From a national perspective, the trade ties made the South region of the US less important to the Northeast as a trade partner.

The Chicago Sanitary and Ship Canal, completed in 1900, largely replaced the functions of the Illinois and Michigan Canal. This canal resulted in the reversal of the direction of flow of the main stem and the South branch of the Chicago River; they used to empty into Lake Michigan and now those river sections flow toward the Des Plaines River. The Sanitary and Ship Canal was built to serve many aims, including ending using Lake Michigan as a sewer, sending waste water through treatment plants and sending it away from Lake Michigan. It is also a waterway for movement of ships.

=== Railway network ===
The next major technology for transportation was railroads. Chicago and the towns along the canal and rivers understood the value of being a hub of a major network. Rail lines spurred out from Chicago by the 1850s, with major growth in the rail network for freight and passenger transportation coming after the American Civil War, when the transcontinental railroads were completed, coast to coast across the US, stopping in Chicago, the heart of Cook County.

=== Public transit ===
Public transit in Cook County is provided by the three service boards of the Northern Illinois Transit Authority (NITA): the Chicago Transit Authority (CTA), Metra, and Pace. The CTA operates bus service primarily in the City of Chicago and a few surroundings suburbs and also operates the Chicago "L" rapid transit system. Metra operates commuter rail service out of four terminals in downtown Chicago and connects the County with the surrounding five Illinois collar counties and Kenosha, Wisconsin. Pace operates bus service primairly in the suburban areas of the County, with a few routes entering Chicago. It also operates paratransit, demand-response, and vanpool service.

The Northern Indiana Commuter Transportation District (NICTD) operates the South Shore Line commuter rai service that connects the County with Northwest Indiana.

Chicago Transit Authority

- Chicago "L"
- Blue Line
- Brown Line
- Green Line
- Orange Line
- Pink Line
- Purple Line
- Red Line
- Yellow Line
- List of Chicago Transit Authority bus routes

Pace

- I-90 Express
- Pace Pulse

Metra

- BNSF Line
- Heritage Corridor
- Metra Electric District
- Milwaukee District North Line
- Milwaukee District West Line
- North Central Service
- Rock Island District
- SouthWest Service
- Union Pacific North Line
- Union Pacific Northwest Line
- Union Pacific West Line

South Shore Line

- Lakeshore Corridor
- Monon Corridor

=== Major highways ===
Following on the well-established position of Chicago as a transportation hub, the Interstate highway network maintained Chicago as a hub of that network, as well as serving the travel needs within the region.

Interstate Highways

- I-55
- I-57
- I-80
- I-88
- I-90
- I-94
- I-190
- I-290
- I-294
- I-355

U.S. Highways

- US 6
- US 12
- US 14
- US 20
- US 30
- US 34
- US 41
- US 45

State Routes

- IL 1
- IL 7
- IL 19
- IL 21
- IL 25
- IL 38
- IL 43
- IL 50
- IL 53
- IL 56
- IL 58
- IL 59
- IL 62
- IL 64
- IL 68
- IL 72
- IL 83
- IL 110 (CKC)
- IL 171
- IL 390
- IL 394

=== Airports ===
When the age of air travel began in the 20th century, Midway Airport was built on 1 square mile (2.6 km^{2}) of land and served as the major Chicago area airport from 1927 to 1955. Midway has been enlarged and continues to operate as of 2024. As air travel became more important for passenger travel, and then for select freight commodities, O'Hare International Airport was built adjacent to a military airfield in the northwest part of Cook County. The City of Chicago annexed the land for the airport, so that the city controls both airports serving a large area. During the second half of the 20th century, it was the world's busiest airport. The approach of Cook County and Chicago to air travel has been the same as the approach to canal, railroad and highway transportation, to serve as a major national hub.

There has been a long running plan for a third major airport to serve the south side of the city and the southern and southwestern suburbs, the Proposed Chicago south suburban airport intended for Peotone, Illinois. The state of Illinois has been addressing this topic since 1986. Some land has been acquired, but there is not a functioning airport there, as of August 2020.

== Communities ==
=== Incorporated communities ===
Largest cities or towns in Cook County, Illinois 2018 U.S. Census Bureau Estimate
Rank		County	Pop.
1	Chicago	Cook / DuPage	2,705,994
2	Elgin	Cook / Kane	111,683
3	Cicero	Cook	81,597
4	Arlington Heights	Cook	75,249
5	Evanston	Cook	73,509
6	Schaumburg	Cook / DuPage	71,290
7	Palatine	Cook	68,053
8	Skokie	Cook	63,280
9	Des Plaines	Cook	58,959
10	Orland Park	Cook / Will	58,312

Community	Community type	Population	Total Area	Water Area	Land Area	Pop. Density
Alsip	village	19,063	6.63	0.10	6.53	2,921.53
Arlington Heights	village	77,676	16.64	0.03	16.61	4,677.87
Barrington (partly in Lake County)	village	10,722	4.79	0.19	4.61	2,327.33
Barrington Hills (mostly)	village	4,114	27.62	0.62	27.00	152.34
Bartlett (mostly in DuPage County)	village	41,105	15.94	0.19	15.75	2,610.01
Bedford Park	village	602	6.04	0.11	5.93	101.45
Bellwood	village	18,789	2.40	0.00	2.40	7,835.28
Bensenville (mostly in DuPage County)	village	18,813	5.58	0.05	5.53	3,401.37
Berkeley	village	5,338	1.40	0.00	1.40	3,807.42
Berwyn	city	57,250	3.90	0.00	3.90	14,664.45
Blue Island	city	22,558	4.16	0.09	4.07	5,541.14
Bridgeview	village	17,027	4.13	0.00	4.13	4,119.77
Broadview	village	7,998	1.78	0.00	1.78	4,500.84
Brookfield	village	19,476	3.07	0.01	3.06	6,356.40
Buffalo Grove (mostly in Lake County)	village	43,212	9.58	0.02	9.56	4,518.67
Burbank	city	29,439	4.17	0.00	4.17	7,059.71
Burnham	village	4,046	1.94	0.09	1.85	2,181.13
Burr Ridge (mostly in DuPage County)	village	11,192	7.33	0.14	7.20	1,554.88
Calumet City	city	36,033	7.32	0.12	7.20	5,005.97
Calumet Park	village	7,025	1.15	0.04	1.12	6,289.17
Chicago (county seat and largest municipality, partly in DuPage County)	city	2,746,388	234.53	6.80	227.73	12,059.84
Chicago Heights	city	27,480	10.30	0.01	10.28	2,672.37
Chicago Ridge	village	14,433	2.27	0.00	2.27	6,363.76
Cicero	town	85,268	5.87	0.00	5.87	14,538.45
Country Club Hills	city	16,775	4.99	0.02	4.97	3,375.25
Countryside	city	6,420	2.88	0.00	2.88	2,230.72
Crestwood	village	10,826	3.08	0.03	3.05	3,550.67
Deer Park (mostly in Lake County)	village	3,681	3.75	0.10	3.65	1,007.39
Deerfield (mostly in Lake County)	village	19,196	5.55	0.02	5.53	3,471.25
Des Plaines	city	60,675	14.38	0.15	14.24	4,261.48
Dixmoor	village	2,973	1.25	0.00	1.25	2,380.30
Dolton	village	21,426	4.69	0.12	4.57	4,687.38
East Dundee (mostly in Kane County)	village	3,152	3.15	0.24	2.91	1,082.05
East Hazel Crest	village	1,297	0.78	0.00	0.78	1,654.34
Elgin (part)	city	114,797	38.60	0.57	38.03	3,018.83
Elk Grove Village (partly in DuPage County)	village	32,812	11.66	0.06	11.60	2,827.89
Elmhurst (part)	city	45,786	10.28	0.06	10.22	4,480.92
Elmwood Park	village	24,521	1.91	0.00	1.91	12,851.68
Evanston	city	78,110	7.80	0.02	7.78	10,041.14
Evergreen Park	village	19,943	3.16	0.00	3.16	6,305.09
Flossmoor	village	9,704	3.66	0.00	3.66	2,650.64
Ford Heights	village	1,813	1.95	0.00	1.95	931.65
Forest Park	village	14,339	2.40	0.00	2.40	5,969.61
Forest View	village	792	1.29	0.13	1.17	678.08
Frankfort (mostly in Will County)	village	20,296	15.79	0.00	15.79	1,285.04
Franklin Park	village	18,467	4.77	0.00	4.77	3,868.24
Glencoe	village	8,849	3.78	0.06	3.72	2,378.76
Glenview	village	48,705	14.04	0.04	14.00	3,478.68
Glenwood	village	8,662	3.26	0.00	3.26	2,653.80
Golf	village	514	0.45	0.00	0.45	1,147.32
Hanover Park (mostly in DuPage County)	village	37,470	6.52	0.10	6.42	5,834.63
Harvey	city	20,324	6.21	0.00	6.21	3,274.90
Harwood Heights	village	9,065	0.82	0.00	0.82	10,987.88
Hazel Crest	village	13,382	3.42	0.02	3.40	3,939.36
Hickory Hills	city	14,505	2.84	0.00	2.84	5,100
Hillside	village	8,320	3.17	0.00	3.17	2,626.26
Hinsdale (mostly in DuPage County)	village	17,395	4.66	0.04	4.62	3,763
Hodgkins	village	1,500	2.77	0.05	2.71	553.10
Hoffman Estates	village	52,530	21.25	0.18	21.07	2,493.71
Homer Glen (mostly in Will County)	village	24,543	22.16	0.04	22.13	1,109.29
Hometown	city	4,343	0.48	0.00	0.48	9,066.81
Homewood	village	19,463	5.26	0.05	5.22	3,731.40
Indian Head Park	village	4,065	0.94	0.01	0.93	4,370.97
Inverness	village	7,616	6.69	0.15	6.53	1,165.60
Justice	village	12,600	2.88	0.04	2.84	4,436.62
Kenilworth	village	2,514	0.61	0.00	0.61	4,141.68
La Grange	village	16,321	2.52	0.00	2.52	6,463.76
La Grange Park	village	13,475	2.23	0.00	2.23	6,034.48
Lansing	village	29,076	7.52	0.06	7.46	3,896.54
Lemont (partly in DuPage County and Will County)	village	17,629	8.74	0.38	8.37	2,107.47
Lincolnwood	village	13,463	2.69	0.00	2.69	5,001.11
Lynwood	village	9,116	5.04	0.08	4.96	1,836.42
Lyons	village	10,817	2.27	0.07	2.21	4,901.22
Markham	city	11,661	5.41	0.00	5.41	2,157.45
Matteson	village	19,073	9.32	0.03	9.29	2,054.17
Maywood	village	23,512	2.72	0.00	2.72	8,653.66
McCook	village	249	2.63	0.02	2.61	95.26
Melrose Park	village	24,796	4.35	0.00	4.35	5,696.30
Merrionette Park	village	1,969	0.38	0.00	0.38	5,250.67
Midlothian	village	14,325	2.82	0.00	2.82	5,081.59
Morton Grove	village	25,297	5.09	0.00	5.09	4,971.89
Mount Prospect	village	56,852	10.76	0.04	10.72	5,303.85
Niles	village	30,912	5.85	0.00	5.85	5,285.91
Norridge	village	15,251	1.81	0.00	1.81	8,435.29
North Riverside	village	7,426	1.64	0.00	1.64	4,517.03
Northbrook	village	35,222	13.30	0.07	13.24	2,660.27
Northfield	village	5,751	3.23	0.00	3.23	1,780.50
Northlake	city	12,840	3.18	0.00	3.18	4,042.82
Oak Brook (mostly in DuPage County)	village	8,163	8.30	0.32	7.98	1,023.45
Oak Forest	city	27,478	6.07	0.05	6.02	4,563.69
Oak Lawn	village	58,362	8.57	0.00	8.57	6,809.24
Oak Park	village	54,583	4.70	0.00	4.70	11,613.40
Olympia Fields	village	4,718	2.94	0.00	2.94	1,605.31
Orland Hills	village	6,893	1.15	0.01	1.15	6,020.09
Orland Park (partly in Will County)	village	58,703	22.31	0.28	22.03	2,664.93
Palatine	village	67,908	14.28	0.16	14.11	4,811.39
Palos Heights	city	12,068	3.87	0.10	3.77	3,197.67
Palos Hills	city	18,530	4.29	0.04	4.25	4,364.11
Palos Park	village	4,899	6.57	0.12	6.45	759.65
Park Forest (partly in Will County)	village	21,687	4.96	0.00	4.96	4,371.50
Park Ridge	city	39,656	7.13	0.05	7.09	5,594.81
Phoenix	village	1,708	0.46	0.00	0.46	3,681.03
Posen	village	5,632	1.17	0.00	1.17	4,817.79
Prospect Heights	city	16,058	4.29	0.03	4.26	3,773.03
Richton Park	village	12,775	4.40	0.01	4.39	2,908.70
River Forest	village	11,794	2.48	0.00	2.48	4,724.60
River Grove	village	10,612	2.39	0.00	2.39	4,438.31
Riverdale	village	10,663	3.75	0.17	3.58	2,982.66
Riverside	village	9,298	2.00	0.02	1.98	4,700.71
Robbins	village	4,629	1.45	0.00	1.45	3,194.62
Rolling Meadows	city	24,200	5.62	0.01	5.62	4,309.12
Roselle (mostly in DuPage County)	village	22,897	5.61	0.08	5.53	4,140.51
Rosemont	village	3,952	1.79	0.00	1.79	2,205.36
Sauk Village (partly in Will County)	village	9,921	4.00	0.00	3.99	2,485.22
Schaumburg (partly in DuPage County)	village	78,723	19.46	0.12	19.35	4,069.21
Schiller Park	village	11,709	2.77	0.00	2.77	4,227.08
Skokie	village	67,824	10.06	0.00	10.06	6,739.27
South Barrington	village	5,077	7.71	0.28	7.43	683.59
South Chicago Heights	village	4,026	1.60	0.02	1.58	2,546.49
South Holland	village	21,465	7.25	0.02	7.24	2,966.42
Steger (partly in Will County)	village	9,584	3.40	0.00	3.40	2,815.51
Stickney	village	7,110	1.96	0.04	1.92	3,695.43
Stone Park	village	4,576	0.34	0.00	0.34	13,302.33
Streamwood	village	39,577	7.83	0.03	7.80	5,075.28
Summit	village	11,161	2.26	0.14	2.12	5,267.11
Thornton	village	2,386	2.40	0.03	2.38	1,004.63
Tinley Park (partly in Will County)	village	55,971	16.13	0.01	16.12	3,472.15
University Park (mostly in Will County)	village	7,145	10.73	0.00	10.73	666.08
Westchester	village	16,892	3.69	0.00	3.69	4,582.75
Western Springs	village	13,629	2.79	0.00	2.79	4,893.72
Wheeling	village	39,137	8.73	0.06	8.67	4,513.03
Willow Springs (small portion in DuPage County)	village	5,857	4.25	0.10	4.15	1,411.67
Wilmette	village	28,170	5.41	0.01	5.40	5,215.70
Winnetka	village	12,475	3.89	0.08	3.81	3,344.00
Woodridge (mostly in DuPage County and Will County)	village	34,158	9.79	0.16	9.63	3,546.67
Worth	village	10,970	2.38	0.01	2.37	4,630.65
Cook County	county	5,275,541	1,635	690	945	3,200

=== Unincorporated communities ===
- Central Stickney
- Indian Hill
- La Grange Highlands
- Nottingham Park
- Orchard Place
- Sag Bridge

=== Historic site ===
- Fort Dearborn

=== Townships ===
The county is divided into 29 townships, in addition to the cities of Chicago and Evanston.

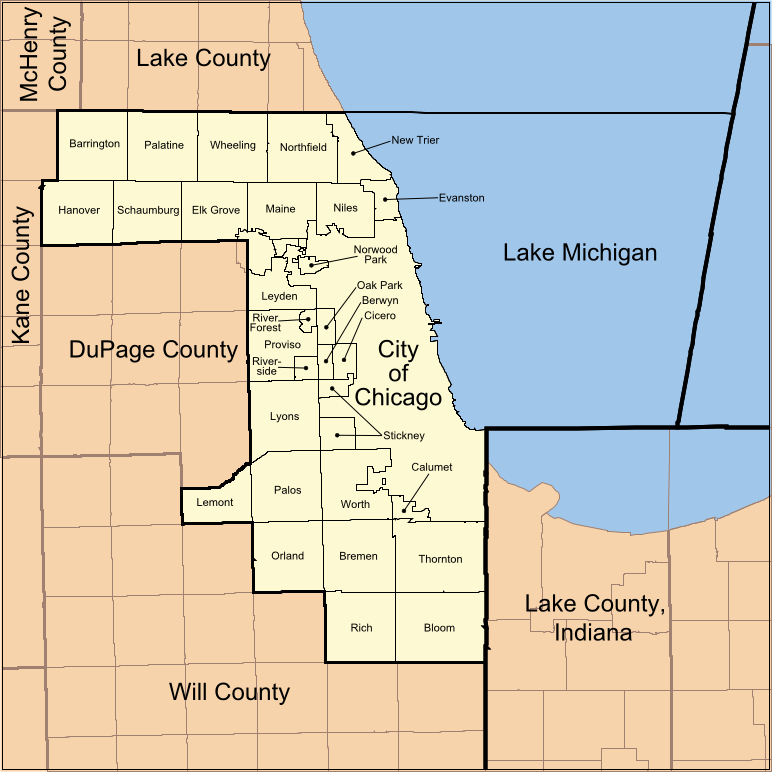
Cook County townships (clickable)

==== Current townships and independent cities ====
The 29 townships and 2 independent cities of Cook County, with their populations as of the 2010 Census, are:

- City of Chicago – 2,695,598
- City of Evanston – 74,486
- Barrington Township – 15,636
- Berwyn Township – 56,657
- Bloom Township – 90,922
- Bremen Township – 110,118
- Calumet Township – 20,777
- Cicero Township – 83,891
- Elk Grove Township – 92,905
- Hanover Township – 99,538
- Lemont Township – 21,113
- Leyden Township – 92,890
- Lyons Township – 111,688
- Maine Township – 135,772
- New Trier Township – 55,424
- Niles Township – 105,882
- Northfield Township – 85,102
- Norwood Park Township – 26,385
- Oak Park Township – 51,878
- Orland Township – 97,558
- Palatine Township – 112,994
- Palos Township – 54,615
- Proviso Township – 151,704
- Rich Township – 76,727
- River Forest Township – 11,172
- Riverside Township – 15,594
- Schaumburg Township – 131,288
- Stickney Township – 40,772
- Thornton Township – 169,326
- Wheeling Township – 153,630
- Worth Township – 152,633

==== Former townships ====
Chicago's eight former townships and annexed parts of others no longer have any governmental structure or responsibility since their annexations, but their names and boundaries are still used on property plats and by Cook County for tax assessment purposes. In 2014, Evanston Township was dissolved by voters and its functions were absorbed by the city of Evanston.

- Evanston Township
- Jefferson Township
- Hyde Park Township
- Lake Township
- Lake View Township
- North Chicago Township
- Rogers Park Township
- South Chicago Township
- West Chicago Township

=== Adjacent counties ===
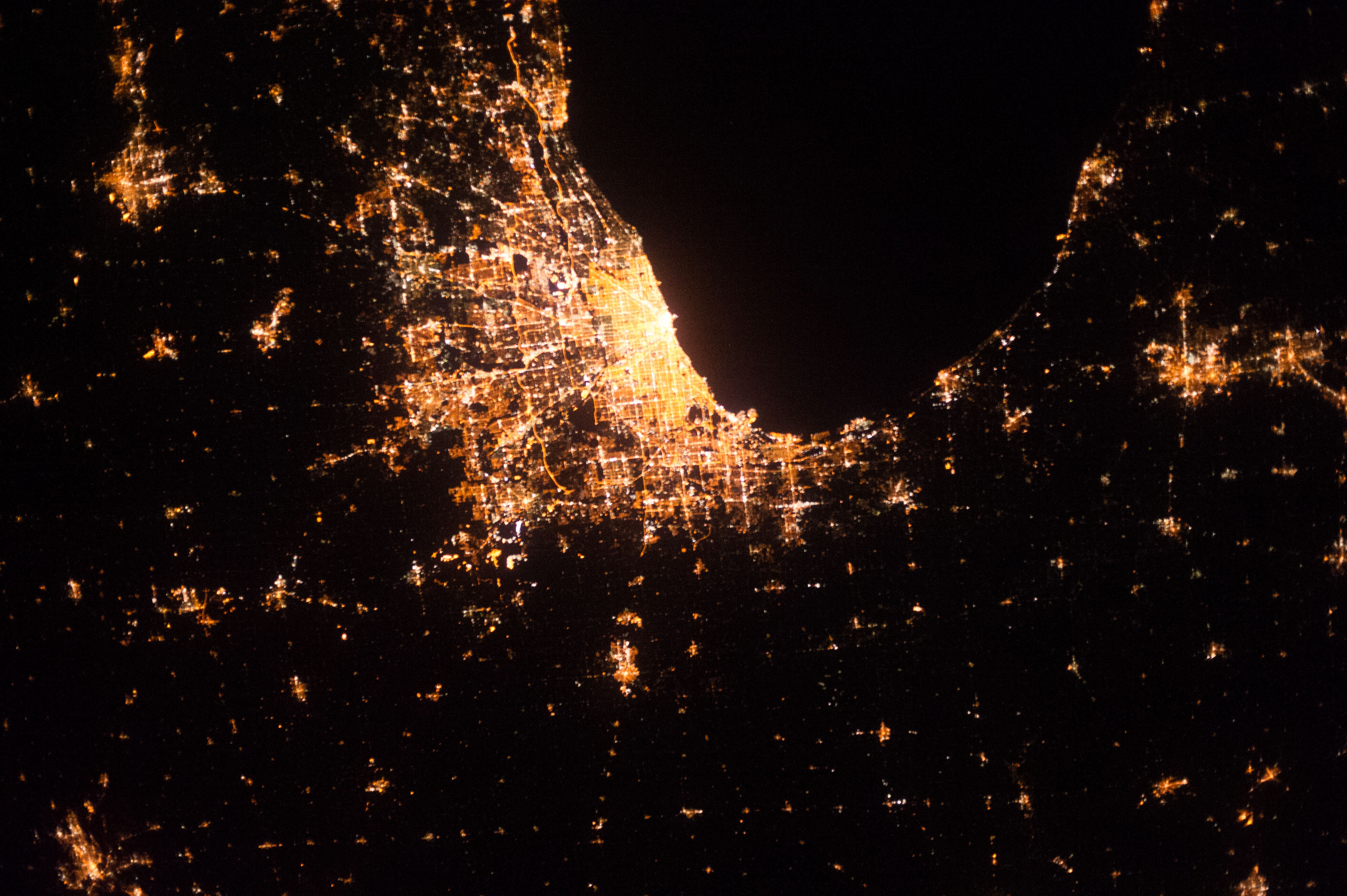
Cook County and adjacent counties, from ISS Expedition 37 in 2013.

- McHenry County, Illinois – northwest
- Lake County, Illinois – north
- Berrien County, Michigan – east (water border on Lake Michigan)
- Porter County, Indiana - southeast (water border on Lake Michigan)
- Lake County, Indiana – southeast
- Will County, Illinois – south
- DuPage County, Illinois – west
- Kane County, Illinois – west

Cook County is one of the few U.S. counties to border two counties of the same name in different states (Lake County, Illinois and Lake County, Indiana).

== Education ==
=== Colleges and universities ===
- Chicago State University
- City Colleges of Chicago
- Columbia College Chicago
- Concordia University Chicago
- DePaul University
- Dominican University
- East–West University
- Illinois Institute of Technology
- Loyola University Chicago
- National Louis University
- Northeastern Illinois University
- North Park University
- Northwestern University
- Oakton College
- Roosevelt University
- Saint Xavier University
- School of the Art Institute of Chicago
- University of Chicago
- University of Illinois Chicago

== See also ==
- Chicago metropolitan area
- Cook County Forest Preserve District
- Metropolitan Water Reclamation District of Greater Chicago
- National Register of Historic Places listings in Cook County, Illinois
