= Kani Kōsen =

1929 short story by Takiji Kobayashi

The Crab Cannery Ship
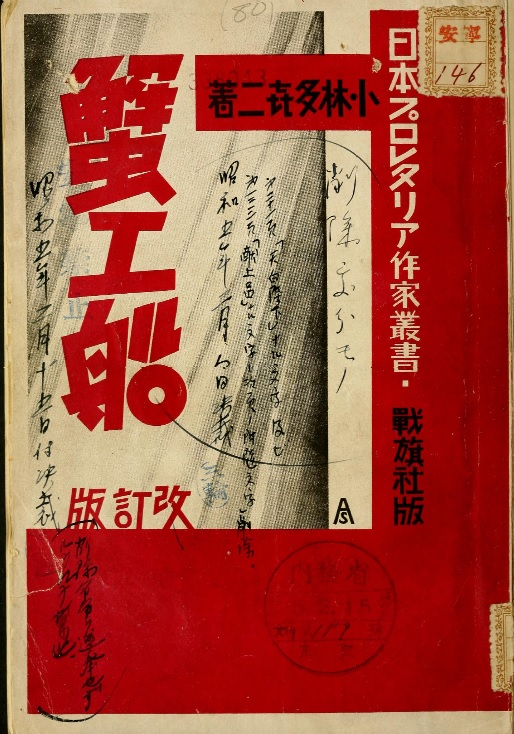
- Author: Takiji Kobayashi
- Original title: 蟹工船
- Language: Japanese
- Genre: Proletarian literature
- Publisher: Senki
- Publication date: 1929
- Publication place: Empire of Japan
- English publication date: 1933

Kani Kōsen (蟹工船; "The Crab Cannery Ship") is a 1929 short novel by Japanese author Takiji Kobayashi which was first serialized in the May and June 1929 issues of the communist literary magazine Senki. In September of the same year, it was released as a standalone book by Senki Company. The book was banned by government censors, but not before selling 15,000 copies. The novel has been released in English as The Cannery Boat (1933), The Factory Ship (1973), and The Crab Cannery Ship (2013).

== Background ==
Kobayashi began writing the work late in 1928 and finished in March of the following year. It was not based on any personal experiences of the author, but was influenced by Yoshiki Hayama's semi-autobiographical novel Umi ni Ikuru Hitobito. The work's immediate inspiration came from Kobayashi's reading of a newspaper's description of floating crab cannery "Hakuai-maru"(ja:博愛丸) workers who had been treated brutally and sued their captain on their return to shore.

Kobayashi considered his use of a collective protagonist rather than a singular hero was a step forward in the creation of a proletarian literature, a claim he made in a letter to his mentor Korehito Kurahara immediately upon completion of the work. The letter also shows the influence orthodox Marxism had on Kobayashi roughly two years after his reading of Das Kapital.

== Plot ==
The work has no single protagonist, and the only named character, the superintendent Asakawa, is portrayed as an inhuman monster. The other characters are various groups of oppressed people: fishermen who began as impoverished farmers and plan on using their earnings to rehabilitate their farms, but wind up resorting to drinking and whoring in Hakodate and Otaru; factory hands in their early teens who have been abandoned by poverty-stricken parents; and students who have been tricked into believing that ship work is attractive summer employment.

== Themes ==
The book expresses a sense of pessimism from the beginning. This extends from the opening remarks to the description of Hakodate harbor as being filled with refuse to the comparison of smaller boats to insects.

== Reception ==
Kani Kōsen sold well enough that 15,000 copies were in circulation before it was banned. Abridged versions that removed politically incorrect content continued to be sold after the book was banned, but the uncut version was not reprinted until 1948. In 2008 it became one of the best-selling works of fiction in Japan, selling around five hundred thousand copies.

The book was well received by Marxist critics on its initial release, and earned Kobayashi a positive reputation. Non-Marxists were less kind: Murao Nakamura attacked the work for its portrayal of individual evil but not organizational evil, attributing all the suffering of the characters to one man in Asakawa. Naoya Shiga was of the opinion that as a work of literature it should move readers directly, not by indirectly conveying ideology. Literary historian and critic Donald Keene wrote that the work "succeeds not because of its message, nor because of its confident appraisal of the future, but because of the vivid, believable details of life aboard the ship." Keene praised the story's unflinching portrayal of sexual violence by the older fishermen against their younger comrades and refusal to set any one figure up as a "worker-hero".

== Adaptations ==
In 1953, the film Kani Kōsen was released, directed by Sō Yamamura and starring himself, Masayuki Mori and Sumiko Hidaka. It was awarded the best cinematography prize at the 1954 Mainichi Film Concours.

A manga version appeared in 2006, the first of four so far. During 2009, two stage adaptations were produced in Tokyo, another was produced in 2012.

A remake of the film Kani kōsen, directed by Hiroyuki Tanaka and starring Ryuhei Matsuda and Hidetoshi Nishijima was released in 2009.

== See also ==
- Factory ship

== Works cited ==
- Keene, Donald (1998) [1984]. A History of Japanese Literature, Vol. 3: Dawn to the West – Japanese Literature of the Modern Era (Fiction) (paperback ed.). New York, NY: Columbia University Press. ISBN 978-0-231-11435-6.
- "Kani Kōsen" 蟹工船. World Encyclopedia (in Japanese). Heibonsha. 1998. Archived from the original on 2023-01-06.
