= H. H. Lewis =

Harold Harwell Lewis
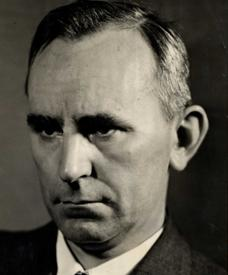
- Born: January 13, 1901; Cape Girardeau, Missouri, United States
- Died: January 24, 1985 (aged 84); Chaffee, Missouri
- Occupations: Writer, laborer
- Writing career
- Period: 1930s to 1960s
- Genres: Poetry and Essay
- Subjects: Social and Political Commentary
- Movement: Modernism

Harold Harwell Lewis (January 13, 1901 – January 24, 1985) was an American poet during the 1930s through the 1970s.

== Biography ==
Harold Harwell Lewis, or H.H. Lewis as he became known, was born January 13, 1901, near Cape Girardeau, Missouri. He was one of four children born to Thomas and Catherine Tisdale Lewis.

He received his secondary education at the Southeast Missouri State Normal School—Third District Training School, which is now named Southeast Missouri State University. During the Great Depression, Lewis traveled as a common laborer in the Southwest. Away from his parents for the first time, Lewis was incredibly poor and many of his encounters and experiences traveling would fuel his future career.

That "stove-devil," heat-blanched and heat-crazed, gaunt and flagrantly dirty, up against it for twelve hours daily, received $60 per month. The waiters got $1.25 per day. The restaurant belonged to a chain of such for dime-gripping bums and low-paid working-stiffs. Came gringos and greasers for coffee and stew, hash, beans—a large bowl of brown beans for a dime. Came Negroes, humblest of all. Came "mouthmen" and "wolves," proletarian beasts of the ghastliest ilk. From the poverty of America, in this bottomless hell, came these contorted and condemned souls.

— H.H. Lewis on his slide into poverty. Found in The Anvil, 1933

He eventually returned to the family farm to pursue a career of freelance writing, including publishing his own magazine, The Outlander. For a brief period in the 1930s Lewis enjoyed a small measure of acclaim. Malcolm Cowley of The New Republic in 1932 called him "the red-starred laureate, the Joe Hill of the Communist Movement." An editor of Partisan Review, in a testy exchange with Lewis, called him "a necrophilic son of a cretin." He was heralded as a rising star of proletarian literature by V. F. Calverton and editors of the Soviet publication, International Literature, Lewis seemed destined to stir up controversy.

H.H. Lewis had a close friendship with famous writer William Carlos Williams, to whom Lewis represented a fresh and vigorous voice in the search for the "low-down Americano," or common man. With such support, both magazines began to published Lewis's prose and poetry in the 1930s, including Mencken's The American Mercury, Jack Conroy's The Anvil, The New Republic, and numerous others. In 1937, Lewis's poetry won the prestigious Harriet Monroe Literary Prize. His poem, "Farmhand's Refrain," first published in Poetry, was anthologized in the 1952 edition of Oscar Williams's A Little Treasury of Modern Poetry but dropped from subsequent editions.

Git plumb outta breath,
Git strangled to death
On de T-bones in de sky?

— H.H. Lewis lines from "Tractors Eat Kerosene"

The Missouri farmhand poet and Communist essayist wrote both poetry and prose on the condition of Native Americans, African-American, and sharecroppers that were unique at the time of his creating them. Lewis tried to embrace the voice of the people, writing in the vernacular as well as writing in a style commonly referred to as Grammar B. His writings were translated into Japanese, French, German, and Russian and he was widely praised and popular in the Soviet Union for his proletarian and revolutionary sympathies.

After several unsuccessful attempts to secure a Guggenheim Fellowship to support research on sharecroppers, Lewis devoted the rest of his life to exposing subversive threats to his country at home and abroad. His poetry and essays often focus on the plight of the sharecropper or on his various conspiracy theories. He was interested particularly in conspiracies relating to the attack on Pearl Harbor and the role played by the Communist Party and the Federal Bureau of Investigation. He recorded the story of his life in an autobiographical story “Down the Skidway.

In 1981 Lewis was the subject of the film “The Farmhand Poet”. He died in Chaffee, Missouri, on January 24, 1985. He is buried in Cape Girardeau.
