= Sunao Tokunaga =

Japanese novelist and writer (1899–1958)

- 徳永 直
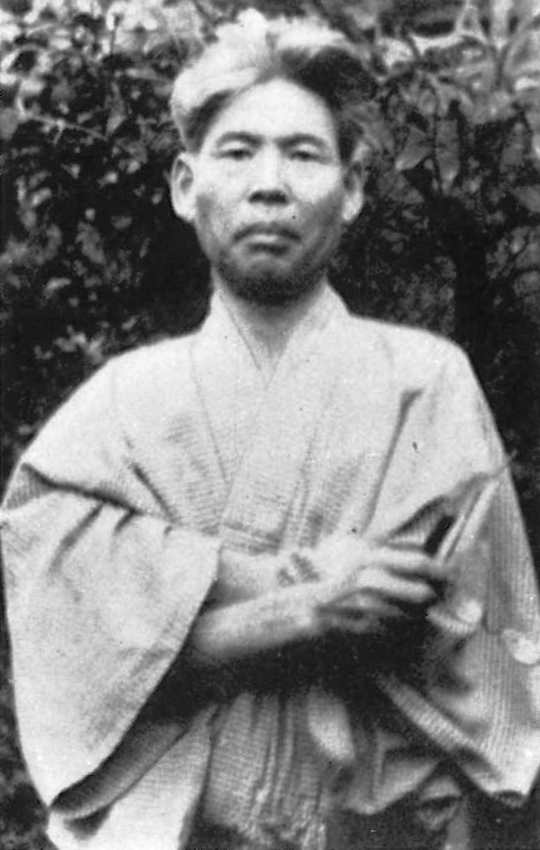
- Sunao Tokunaga
- Born: January 20, 1899; Kumamoto Prefecture, Japan
- Died: February 15, 1958 (aged 59)
- Occupations: Writer, printer
- Writing career
- Genres: novels, short stories, essays
- Notable work: Taiyō no nai Machi
- Literary movement: proletarian literature

Sunao Tokunaga (徳永 直; 1899–1958) was a Japanese proletarian writer.

== Biography ==
Sunao Tokunaga was born on January 20, 1899, in Kumamoto Prefecture. He was one of first writers of the Japanese proletarian literature movement of the 1920s to come from a truly lower-class background.

He dropped out of elementary school, and at the age of twelve became a printer's apprentice. In 1922, he began working for the Hakubunkan Press (博文館印刷所 Hakubunkan-insatsusho), later renamed to the Kyōdō Press (共同印刷所 Kyōdō-insatsusho). He took part in union activities while actively writing. The union restricted his literary activities and extracted a promise from him that he would not write any novels.

In 1926, he joined some 3,000 Kyōdō employees in striking. After more than two months, the union was completely defeated, and 1,700 employees, including Tokunaga, were fired. This experience provided inspiration for his most important novel, Taiyō no nai Machi (太陽のない街, "The Street without Sunlight"), which he began in 1928. He eventually found another printing job at a large company, and while working there began his literary career. He joined the Japan Proletarian Writers' League (日本プロレタリア作家同盟 Nihon Puroretaria Sakka Dōmei, also abbreviated "NALP") in February 1929.

In March 1932, Tokunaga wrote an article expressing a desire for a popular literature that the proletariat could enjoy, which inspired a sharp critical response from Takiji Kobayashi, accusing Tokunaga of "right-wing, opportunistic tendencies". In May of the same year several members of NALP, including Tokunaga, were rounded up for questioning by police following a meeting, but Tokunaga was soon released. He left the League in October of the following year over what he saw as their prioritizing politics over literary merit.

In October 1937 he requested his publisher withdraw Taiyō no nai Machi from print in light of the breakout of war with China. He saw it as necessary for Japanese to unify during the war. He continued to publish short stories and essays that were inoffensive to the authorities throughout the Pacific War.

In 1945, immediately following Japan's loss in the war, Tokunaga, Shigeharu Nakano, Yuriko Miyamoto and others formed the Shin Nihon Bungakkai ("New Japanese Literary World") as a successor to the various pre-war socialist literary groups. He joined the Communist Party of Japan in 1946, allowed the republication of Taiyō no nai Machi, and was welcomed back into the proletarian literary movement.

In 1954, he journeyed to Moscow to represent Japan at the Congress of the Soviet Writers' Union.

He died on February 15, 1958.

== Works cited ==
- Keene, Donald (1998) [1984]. A History of Japanese Literature, Vol. 3: Dawn to the West – Japanese Literature of the Modern Era (Fiction) (paperback ed.). New York, NY: Columbia University Press. ISBN 978-0-231-11435-6.
- Ōtsuka, Hiroshi (1994). "Tokunaga Sunao" 徳永直. Encyclopedia Nipponica (in Japanese). Shogakukan.
