= Taiyō no nai Machi =

Japanese novel by Sunao Tokunaga

Taiyō no nai Machi (太陽のない街, "The Street without Sunlight") is a Japanese novel written by Sunao Tokunaga. The novel was adapted into a film in 1954 directed by Satsuo Yamamoto.

== Overview ==
Taiyō no nai Machi is a proletarian novel by Sunao Tokunaga (1899–1958). It was first published in serialized form in the literary magazine Senki between June and November of 1929.

== Background ==
The novel was partly inspired by Tokunaga's experiences being fired from his job at a printing company following his participation in a labour strike in 1926. He began writing the novel in 1928.

Different accounts of the origins of the work were presented by Fusao Hayashi in his 1955 memoirs and Tokunaga himself in a 1930 essay. Literary historian Donald Keene places more trust in Hayashi's account, which is presented below.

In the spring of 1929, Tokunaga presented an early manuscript to Hayashi, an acquaintance who was glad to assist the writing career of a truly working-class author. Hayashi was distressed about the writing style of the work, which resembled that of a popular magazine, but Tokunaga responded with the concern that proletarian readers would be unable to understand a work written in a more literary style. Hayashi nevertheless suggested Tokunaga rewrite the book, loaning him a copy of a Japanese translation of Fyodor Gladkov's 1925 novel Cement and recommending he follow Gladkov's writing style. Tokunaga admitted to Hayashi a few days later that he had read Cement but would be unable to mimic Gladkov's style.

Hayashi offered to rewrite the opening to provide Tokunaga with a model, going on to completely rewrite the first ten or so pages and extensively revise the rest. After Tokunaga presented the completed work to Hayashi, Hayashi recommended it to the publishers of Senki.

== Reception ==
Taiyō no nai Machi was well received on initial publication, selling 40,000 copies and turning Tokunaga into the first writer of the proletarian movement whose book was so successful as to allow him to build a house on the proceeds. Contemporary proletarian writer Shigeharu Nakano praised the work as a rare well-written novel by a member of the working class.

Keene called the work Tokunaga's "most important work". While noting that the work has been critically acclaimed, Keene himself dismisses it as "not a good novel" relying on "stock types" of characters being placed in "implausibly melodramatic situations."

=== Translations ===
The work was translated into German in 1930 and Russian in 1932, before going on to appear in several other European languages.

== Film Cast ==
- Sumiko Hidaka as Takae Haruki
- Hiroshi Nihonyanagi as Hagimura
- Seiji Miyaguchi as Father of Okimi
- Eijirō Tōno as president Kunio
- Tanie Kitabayashi as grand mother of Matsutaro
- Masao Shimizu as president Okawa
- Isao Tamagawa as Moriyama
- Toshio Takahara as young man
- Toru Abe as detective
- Kō Nishimura as detective
- Taiji Tonoyama as Genichi Inoue
- Yoshi Katō as Ishizuka

== Works cited ==
- Keene, Donald (1998) [1984]. A History of Japanese Literature, Vol. 3: Dawn to the West – Japanese Literature of the Modern Era (Fiction) (paperback ed.). New York, NY: Columbia University Press. ISBN 978-0-231-11435-6.
- Ōtsuka, Hiroshi (1994). "Taiyō no nai Machi" 太陽のない街. Encyclopedia Nipponica (in Japanese). Shogakukan.
