= The Disinherited =

The Disinherited may refer to:

- The Disinherited (novel), a 1933 novel by Jack Conroy
- The Disinherited (group), a Spanish clandestine anarchist group
