= Mike Gold =

American writer (1893–1967)

Michael Gold
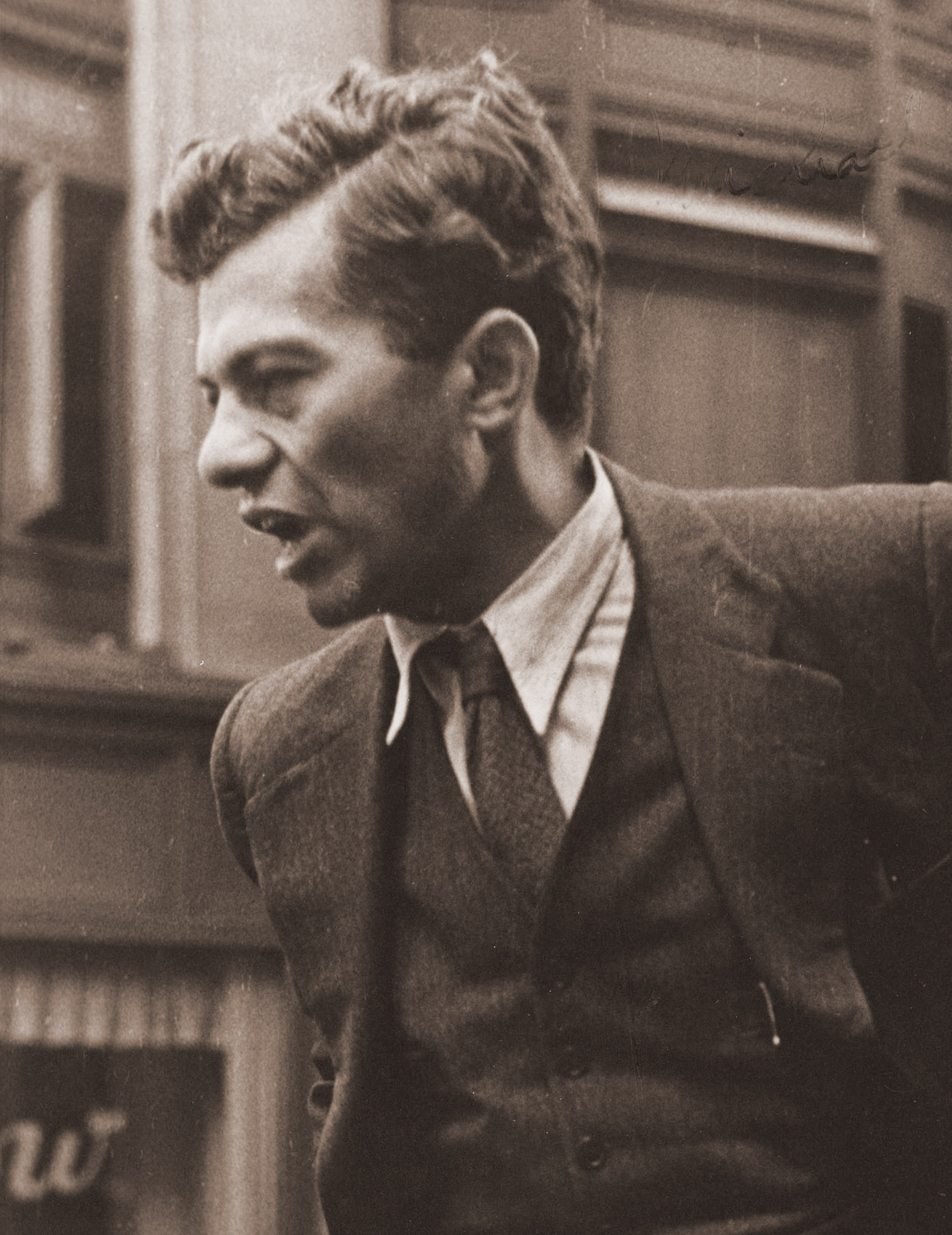
- Mike Gold speaking to a New York crowd on May Day in the 1930s
- Born: Itzhok Isaak Granich; April 12, 1893; New York City, U.S.
- Died: May 14, 1967 (aged 74); Terra Linda, California, U.S.
- Occupations: Author; Magazine editor; Literary critic
- Spouse: Elizabeth Granich
- Children: Nicholas; Carl Granich
- Writing career
- Notable work: Jews without Money
- Movement: Proletarian literature

Michael Gold (April 12, 1893 – May 14, 1967) was the pen-name of Jewish-American writer Itzhok Isaak Granich. A lifelong communist, Gold was a novelist, journalist, magazine editor, newspaper columnist, playwright, and literary critic. His semi-autobiographical novel Jews without Money (1930) was a bestseller. During the 1930s and 1940s, Gold was considered the preeminent author and editor of U.S. proletarian literature.

== Early life ==
Gold was born Itzhok Isaak Granich on April 12, 1893 on Delancey Street on the Lower East Side of Manhattan in New York City. His parents, Chaim Granich and Gittel Schwartz Granich, were Romanian Jewish immigrants. He had two younger brothers, Emmanuel and George, and a sister, Esther.

When Chaim's small business failed and he became ill, the twelve-year-old Itzhok was forced, after a half year of high school, into a series of grinding jobs: errand boy in garment factories, shipping clerk, printer's assistant, night porter, driver's helper for the Adams Express Company, and filing clerk for the Southern Pacific Railroad.

An early radicalizing experience occurred in April 1914. Itzhok was out of work and happened to wander into Union Square where an unemployment protest was in progress. He heard "passionate anticapitalist speeches" before the crowd was attacked by police. While trying to help an elderly woman who had been beaten, he himself was clubbed and bloodied by a policeman. The next day, Itzhok bought his first copy of the socialist journal The Masses. He later said, "I have always been grateful to that cop and that club. He introduced me to literature and the revolution."

== Career ==
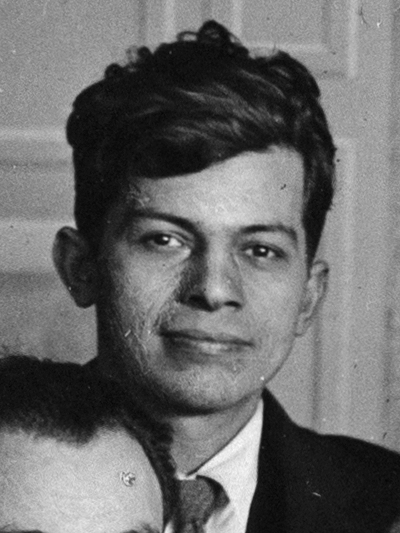
Gold c. 1922–1923

Itzhok Granich began his writing career by submitting poems and articles to The Masses, edited by Floyd Dell and Max Eastman. He also wrote one-act plays of tenement life for the Provincetown Players. For his initial writings, he chose the pseudonym Irwin Granich. Shortly after the 1919-20 Palmer Raids on radicals, he switched to Michael Gold, reportedly because it was the name of a Jewish Civil War veteran and abolitionist whom he admired for having fought to "free the slaves". His first published work, a poem entitled "Three Whose Hatred Killed Them", appeared in the August 1914 edition of The Masses. The poem describes anarchists killed in a Lexington Avenue tenement by their own bomb. The poem opens with the lines: "These wild, bitter men, whose iron hatred burst too soon, / Judge them not harshly, O comrades. / Forgive them their sin, for they loved much. / They hated, but it was the enemy of man they hated."

In 1924–25, Gold made his first visit to Moscow. Until his death, he remained an ardent supporter of the Bolshevik Revolution and of the Soviet Union in all its phases. In 1922, he had written:

The Russian Bolsheviks will leave the world a better place than Jesus left it. They will leave it on the threshold of the final victory—the poor will have bread and peace and culture in another generation, not churches and a swarm of lying parasite minister dogs, the legacy of Jesus.

In 1921–22, Gold and Claude McKay became Executive Editors of Max Eastman's magazine The Liberator. In 1926, Gold and Joseph Freeman co-founded New Masses magazine, which featured leftist literature, satirical cartoons, and journalistic pieces, and also helped establish radical theater groups. Gold was the New Masses reporter who covered the Sacco and Vanzetti case up until their executions in Boston in September 1927. He served as New Masses editor-in-chief from June 1928 till 1934.

The February 1921 issue of The Liberator included Gold's seminal essay, "Towards Proletarian Art". He argued that "a mighty national art cannot arise save out of the soil of the masses." The essay was, according to Walter Rideout, "the first attempt in America to formulate a definition for what was to become the most important critical term among radical literary groups of the early thirties—'proletarian literature.'" At the end of the decade, in the January 1929 issue of New Masses, Gold's call to action "Go Left, Young Writers!" sparked the proletarian literature movement in the U.S., which saw the emergence of writers with true working-class credentials. In his editorial decisions at The Liberator and New Masses, Gold preferred journalism, poems, letters, and short stories by ordinary workers over the writings of literary leftists from bourgeois backgrounds.

Gold derided fiction that he determined did not meet the "proletarian literature" standard. In a New Masses article entitled "Gertrude Stein: A Literary Idiot", he charged that her works "resemble the monotonous gibberings of paranoiacs in the private wards of asylums ... The literary idiocy of Gertrude Stein only reflects the madness of the whole system of capitalist values. It is part of the signs of doom that are written largely everywhere on the walls of bourgeois society." In "Proletarian Realism" (1930), he said of Marcel Proust: "The worst example and the best of what we do not want to do is the spectacle of Proust, master-masturbator of the bourgeois literature. We know the suffering of hungry, persecuted and heroic millions is enough of a theme for anyone, without inventing these precious silly little agonies." In a 1930 New Republic article, "Wilder: Prophet of the Genteel Christ", Gold assailed the Pulitzer Prize winner Thornton Wilder in equally vitriolic terms.

Throughout the 1920s, Gold worked on his novel, Jews without Money (it was to be his only novel). It was a fictionalized autobiography about growing up in the impoverished world of the Lower East Side. Published in February 1930, shortly after the onset of the Great Depression, it was an immediate success. By October of that year, it had already gone into its eleventh printing. The book was soon translated into sixteen languages. Jews without Money became a prototype for the American proletarian novel. In his "Author's Note" to the novel (added in the 1935 reprint), Gold wrote, "I have told in my book a tale of Jewish poverty in one ghetto, that of New York. The same story can be told of a hundred other ghettoes scattered over all the world. For centuries the Jew has lived in this universal ghetto. Yiddish literature is saturated with the ghetto melancholy and poverty." Critic Richard Tuerk called Jews without Money "the story of the education of a radical" and "a carefully worked, unified piece of art."

The popularity of the novel made Gold a national figure. He was portrayed as the left's "literary czar" and the "cultural commissar" of the Communist Party (CPUSA). He was referred to as "America's most famous Communist writer". In 1933, Gold launched his "Change the World!" column in the CPUSA's newspaper The Daily Worker (and later in People's Daily World). He would write the column off and on for over a quarter century. It served as a platform to voice his sometimes caustic opinions about the literary artists and trends of that era.

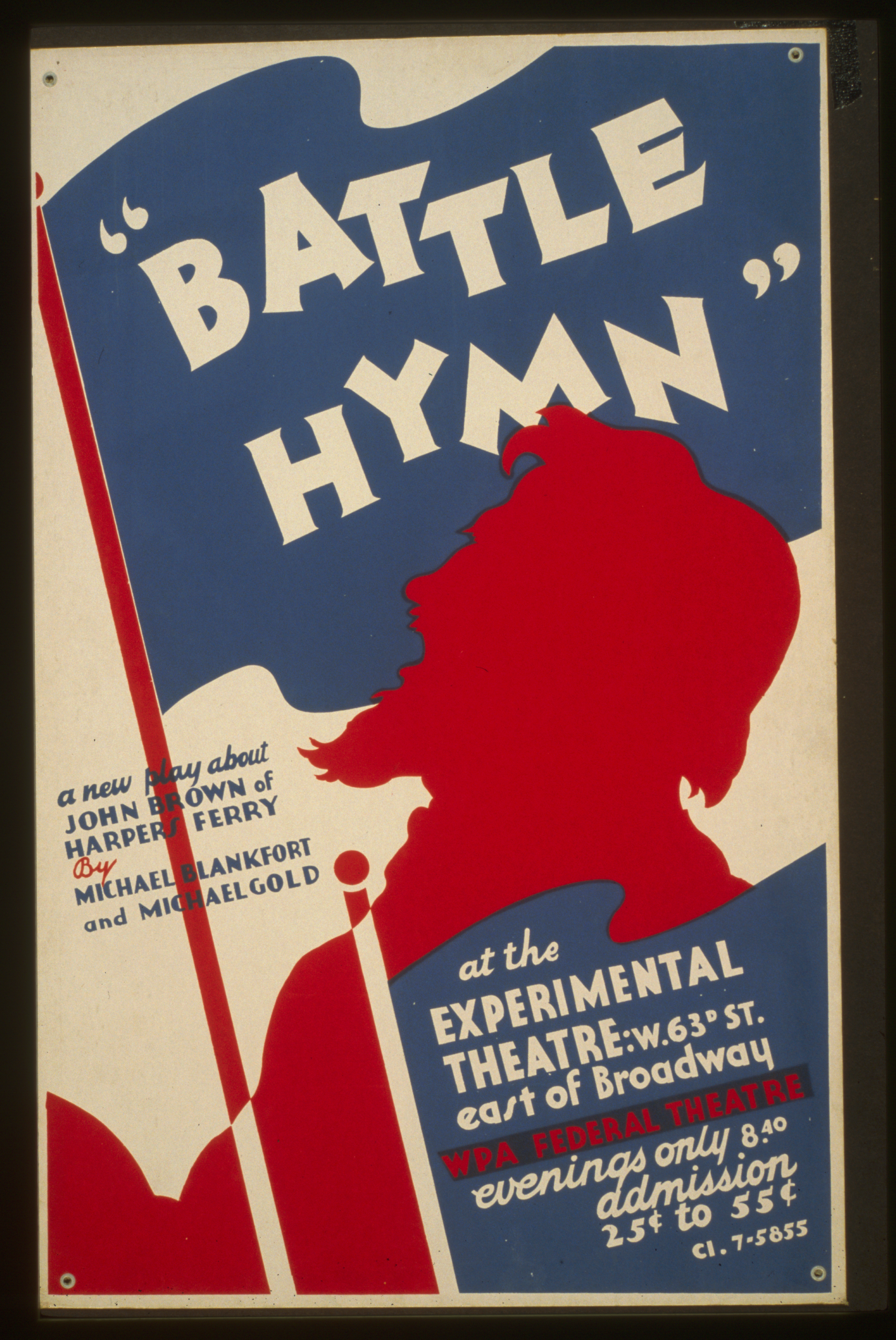
Poster for Battle Hymn, which opened 22 May 1936

In 1936, Gold continued his longtime interest in American abolitionist John Brown (Gold's first published book was a biography of Brown) by co-authoring with Michael Blankfort the play Battle Hymn. Produced by the Federal Theatre Project of the Works Progress Administration (WPA), the play contains scenes from Brown's life. It ran for 72 performances at the Experimental Theatre on 63rd Street in New York.

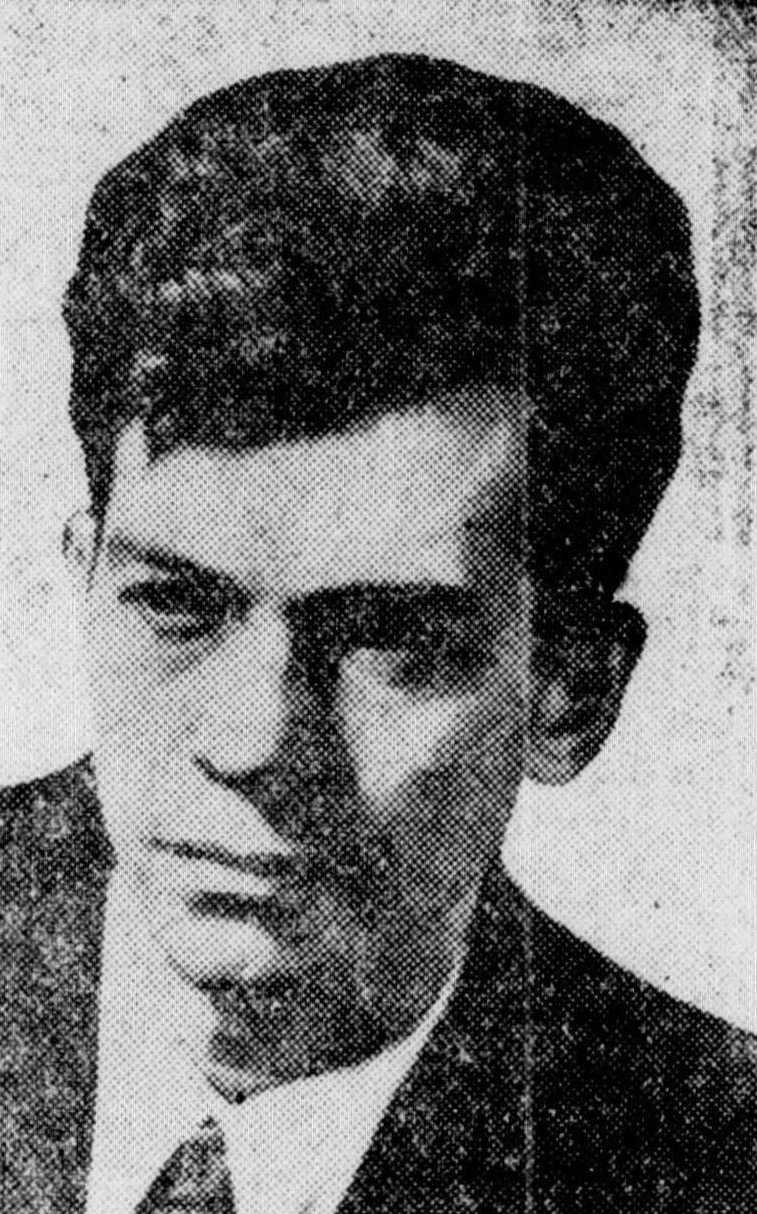
Gold c. 1937

Gold's combative nature earned him numerous enemies. When labor organizer Fred Beal described the 1930s "American Communist Colony in Moscow" (of which Gold was sometimes a part), he scornfully characterized Gold as a "sentimental revolutionist", with an intense detestation for liberals, who was "anxious to impress people with his 'proletarian' childhood among bedbugs, rats and roaches." As a literary critic, Gold fiercely denounced left-wing authors who he believed had deviated from the Communist Party line. Among those he denounced were Albert Maltz, John Howard Lawson, and the "renegade" Ernest Hemingway, who while never a Communist had been sympathetic to leftist causes but came under fire for his writing on the Spanish Civil War in For Whom the Bell Tolls. Hemingway did not appreciate Gold's harsh criticism and dropped by The Daily Worker office to speak with Gold. When informed that Gold was out that day and asked if there was any message to leave for him, Hemingway replied, "Ok, tell Mike Gold that Ernest Hemingway says he should go fuck himself."

Gold spent the McCarthy era "blacklisted and broke". In 1951, after a visit from two FBI agents, he noted that "Such visits are becoming terribly commonplace in the land of Walt Whitman", and that "Writers are being sent to prison for their opinions." Due to sharply declining circulation, The Daily Worker laid him off and he had to resort to odd jobs, including "in a print shop, at a summer camp, and as a janitor. He flirted with opening a coin laundry." His wife Elizabeth, a Sorbonne-trained lawyer, was also blacklisted and could only get custodial and factory work. In late 1956, Gold and his family relocated to San Francisco where he was hired by the West Coast-based People's Daily World to resume the "Change the World!" column. For the next decade, his columns contained book reviews and other literary criticism, but his tone was mellower and less judgmental than it had been in the 1930s and '40s. He wrote about the major events of the period such as the Civil Rights movement, Space Race, and Vietnam War. By 1966, he was losing his eyesight from the effects of diabetes and had to dictate his writing.

== Personal life and death ==
The social activist Dorothy Day was romantically involved with Gold for several years after they met in 1917.

Michael Gold died in Terra Linda, California, on May 14, 1967, from complications following a stroke. He was 74 years old. He was survived by his wife Elizabeth and two sons, Nicholas and Carl.

== Legacy ==
Gold's papers reside at the Tamiment Library and Robert F. Wagner Archives at New York University in New York City.

Alice Neel painted Gold's portrait in 1952 and then again after his death.

== Works ==
- Life of John Brown. Girard, KS: Haldeman-Julius, 1924. LCCN ca24-722
- Proletarian Song Book of Lyrics from the Operetta "The Last Revolution". Co-written with J. Ramirez, music by Rudolph Liebich. Local Chicago Workers Party of America, c. 1924.
- The Damned Agitator and Other Stories. Little Red Library, no. 7. Chicago: The Daily Worker Publishing Co. 1926. OCLC 66405421.
- Hoboken Blues: or The Black Rip Van Winkle: A Modern Negro Fantasia on an Old American Theme. New York: New Playwrights Theatre, 1928.
- 120 Million. New York: International Publishers. 1929. LCCN 29003997.
- Fiesta: A Play in Three Acts. 1929.
- Money: A Play in One Act. New York: Samuel French, 1930.
- Jews without Money. New York: Horace Liveright. 1930. LCCN 30005614.
- Charlie Chaplin's Parade. New York: Harcourt, Brace, 1930. LCCN 30-23892.
- Proletarian Literature in the United States: An Anthology. (Contributor.) New York: International Publishers, 1935. LCCN 35-27433.
- "Battle Hymn": A Play in Three Acts. With Michael Blankfort. New York: Play Bureau, Federal Theatre Project, 1936.
- Change the World!. New York: International Publishers. 1937. LCCN 37008580.
- The Hollow Men. New York: International Publishers. 1941. LCCN 41011939.
- David Burliuk: Artist-Scholar, Father of Russian Futurism. New York: A.C.A. Gallery, 1944.
- Rhymes for Our Times. With Bill Silverman and William Avstreih. Bronx, NY: Lodge 600, Jewish People's Fraternal Order of the International Workers Order, 1946. OCLC 44904242.
- The Mike Gold Reader. New York: International Publishers. 1954. LCCN 54009643.
