= Senki =

Japanese proletarian literary magazine

Senki 戦旗
- Editor: Seizaburō Yamada (1928–1930)
- Editor: Shigeji Tsuboi (1930)
- Editor: Takeo Ueno (1930–1931)
- Categories: Proletarian literature
- Frequency: Monthly
- Circulation: 26,000 (c. 1930)
- First issue: 1 May 1928
- Final issue: December 30, 1931
- Company: Senki Company
- Country: Empire of Japan
- Language: Japanese

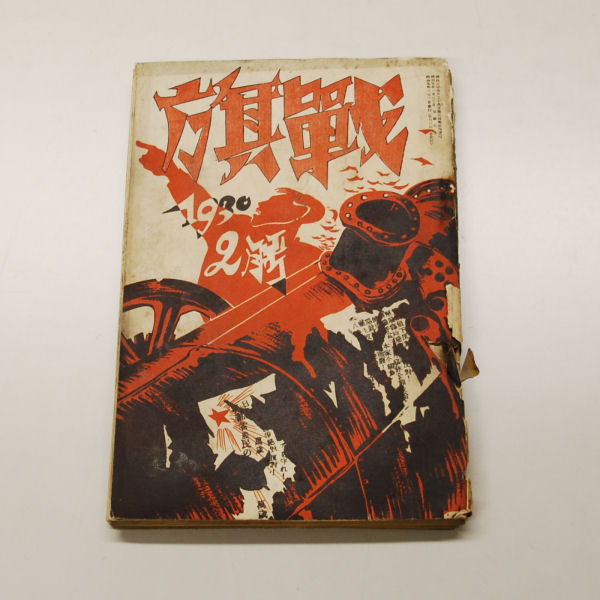
A February 1930 issue of Senki from the Osaka Labor Archive

Senki (戦旗, "Battle Flag") was a Japanese proletarian literary magazine in the late 1920s and early 1930s.

== Overview ==
Senki was a Japanese proletarian literary magazine published between May 1928 and December 1931.

== Background ==
In March 1928 the Japanese Proletarian Artists' Federation (Esperanto name: Nippona Artista Proleta Federacio, abbreviated NAPF, ナップ) was formed from a merger of the Nihon Puroretaria Geijutsu Renmei (which was under the direction of the Japan Communist Party) and the Zen'ei Geijutsu-ka Dōmei. The organization established Senki as the monthly organ and released its first issue in May of that year.

== Publication history ==
The first issue of Senki was published in May 1928. In December of the same year, its publisher NAPF was reorganized as the Japan Congress of Proletarian Artists' Organizations (全日本無産者芸術団体協議会 Zen-Nihon Musansha Geijutsu Dantai Kyōgikai, also abbreviated NAPF) and publication of Senki was taken over by the newly established Senki Company (戦旗社 Senki-sha). The magazine was therefore transformed from the official magazine of NAPF into a general magazine of political education, and in September of the following year the Senki Company became fully independent of NAPF.

In November 1931, NAPF was liquidated in the creation of the Japanese Proletarian Cultural Federation (Federacio de Proletaj Kultur Organizoj Japanaj, abbreviated KOPF, コップ). Publication of the magazine ceased with the December 1931 issue.

Excluding issues that were banned by government censors, 43 issues of Senki entered print in the magazine's run. Supplements for a youth (Shōnen Senki 少年戦旗) and female audience (Fujin Senki 婦人戦旗) were also published. It suffered strict government censorship, and at the height of its popularity had a circulation of around 23,000.

=== Notable works ===
Several important works of Japan's proletarian literature movement first saw print in the pages of Senki, including:

- 1928 nen 3 gatsu 15 nichi (November and December 1928)
- Kani Kōsen (May and June 1929)
- Taiyō no nai Machi (June, July, August, September and November 1929)

== Reception and legacy ==
Reprints of Senki were published between 1976 and 1977 by the Senki Reprint Publication Society (戦旗復刻版刊行会 Senki Fukkoku-ban Kankō-kai).

== Works cited ==
- Keene, Donald (1998) [1984]. A History of Japanese Literature, Vol. 3: Dawn to the West – Japanese Literature of the Modern Era (Fiction) (paperback ed.). New York, NY: Columbia University Press. ISBN 978-0-231-11435-6.
- Ōtsuka, Hiroshi (1994). "Taiyō no nai Machi" 太陽のない街. Encyclopedia Nipponica (in Japanese). Shogakukan.
- Sofue, Shōji (1994). "Senki" 戦旗. Encyclopedia Nipponica (in Japanese). Shogakukan.
