= Umi ni Ikuru Hitobito =

Umi ni Ikuru Hitobito (海に生くる人々, "Those Who Live on the Sea") is a 1926 novel by Japanese author Yoshiki Hayama.

Hayama had spent a year in Waseda University where he picked up a few intellectual habits, but after leaving the university he worked on a ship carrying coal from Hokkaidō and Yokohama.

The novel recounts his experiences aboard this ship, divided between several characters: Fujiwara is the leader of a group of crew members on the Manju-maru who are on strike, representing Hayama's interest in Marxism; Hata is a hot-tempered seaman on a quest for justice, representing Hayama's youthful ardour; and Yasui is a man who injures his leg and is denied medical attention, mirroring an experience Hayama himself had. Hayama wrote the novel while in a Nagoya prison for union activity in 1924.

== Plot ==
The story takes place in 1914, when the outbreak of war in Europe brings great wealth to Japan. The crew of the ship Manju-maru, however, suffer under a brutal and despotic captain and his officers as the ship journeys south from the port of Muroran. The captain is indifferent to the suffering of both his own men and those on a sinking ship nearby, and cares only for his own pleasures, be they at home or at a hot spring in Muroran with a female companion. He treats any resistance on the part of those under his command as insubordination or laziness.

The book describes the various hobbies of the sailors, some caring for nothing but women and others obsessed with confectioneries. One of the sailors, Fujiwara, dreams of liberating the proletariat, and while class-consciousness is on full display in the novel, parts of Fujiwara's socialism are anachronistic for the setting. (Note: Examples include his recognizing a Japanese translation of Das Kapital, which did not appear in Japanese until 1920, and his understanding of the labour movement reflecting a post-October Revolution influence.)

At the climax of the novel the sailors go on strike and demand an improvement to their working conditions, demands to which the captain accedes for selfish reasons. When the ship arrives in Yokohama, though, harbour police arrest Fujiwara and Hata, and four other ringleaders are expelled from the ship. The last line reads: "They waited for their punishment to be decided."

== Reception ==
Literary historian and critic Donald Keene called the work Hayama's "major contribution to the proletarian literature movement". While noting that the work has been praised as "epochmaking" and as a cornerstone of not only the proletarian literature movement but of all of Taishō literature, Keene himself dismisses it as "a conspicuously bad book" when "[j]udged by normal standards of plot, characterization, style, and so on."

== Works cited ==
- Keene, Donald (1998) [1984]. A History of Japanese Literature, Vol. 3: Dawn to the West – Japanese Literature of the Modern Era (Fiction) (paperback ed.). New York, NY: Columbia University Press. ISBN 978-0-231-11435-6.
