= Jews without Money =

1930 novel by Michael Gold

- Cover of first UK edition, 1930
- Author: Michael Gold
- Language: English
- Publisher: Horace Liveright
- Publication date: 1930
- Publication place: United States
- Media type: Print (hardcover, paperback)
- Pages: 309

Jews without Money is a 1930 semi-autobiographical novel by American writer Michael Gold. It tells of a boy growing up in the impoverished Jewish immigrant ghetto of New York's Lower East Side in the late 19th and early 20th century.

Published by Horace Liveright in February 1930—shortly after the October 1929 stock market crash and the onset of the Great Depression—the book's gritty depiction of tenement life resonated with readers and catapulted Gold to literary fame.

== Description ==
Jews without Money is set in a slum populated mainly by Jewish immigrants from Eastern Europe. It begins in the late 1890s. The protagonist and first-person narrator is young "Mikey Gold", the author's alter ego. Mikey's father, the Romanian-born Herman Gold, is an avid storyteller who believes in the American Dream of upward mobility. He enjoys some modest early business success, but then his livelihood is stolen by his cousin Sam Kravitz who cheats Herman out of partial ownership of a suspender factory. Herman is compelled to work as a house painter and resents being an exploited employee. He soon suffers from lead poisoning and falls from a scaffold, breaking his legs. He is unable to work for an extended period of time, thus pushing the Gold family further into poverty.

Mikey's mother Katie finds a job toiling long hours in a cafeteria-style restaurant. She is perhaps the novel's strongest, most admirable character. Michael Gold later called her "the heroine of Jews without Money". Although Mikey is a bright student and "valedictory orator", he decides he must, as the eldest child, drop out of high school to assist his mother in contributing wages to the household.

Living in close quarters in a tenement filled with crime and vice, Mikey comes into daily contact with hustlers, prostitutes, con artists, and dangerous gangsters like upstairs neighbor Louis "One Eye". For protection against rival street gangs, Mikey and his friends form a Chrystie Street gang. Part of the novel's appeal is his sardonic commentary as the hard-bitten narrator. This is how he describes the hated after-school Chaider, a Jewish religious school his parents forced him to attend:

There is no hell fire in the orthodox Jewish religion. Children are not taught to harrow themselves searching for sin; nor to fear the hereafter. But they must memorize a long rigmarole of Hebrew prayers. Reb Moisha was my teacher. This man was a walking, belching symbol of the decay of orthodox Judaism. What could such as he teach any one? He was ignorant as a rat. He was a foul smelling, emaciated beggar who had never read anything, or seen anything, who knew absolutely nothing but this sterile memory course in dead Hebrew which he whipped into the heads and backsides of little boys.

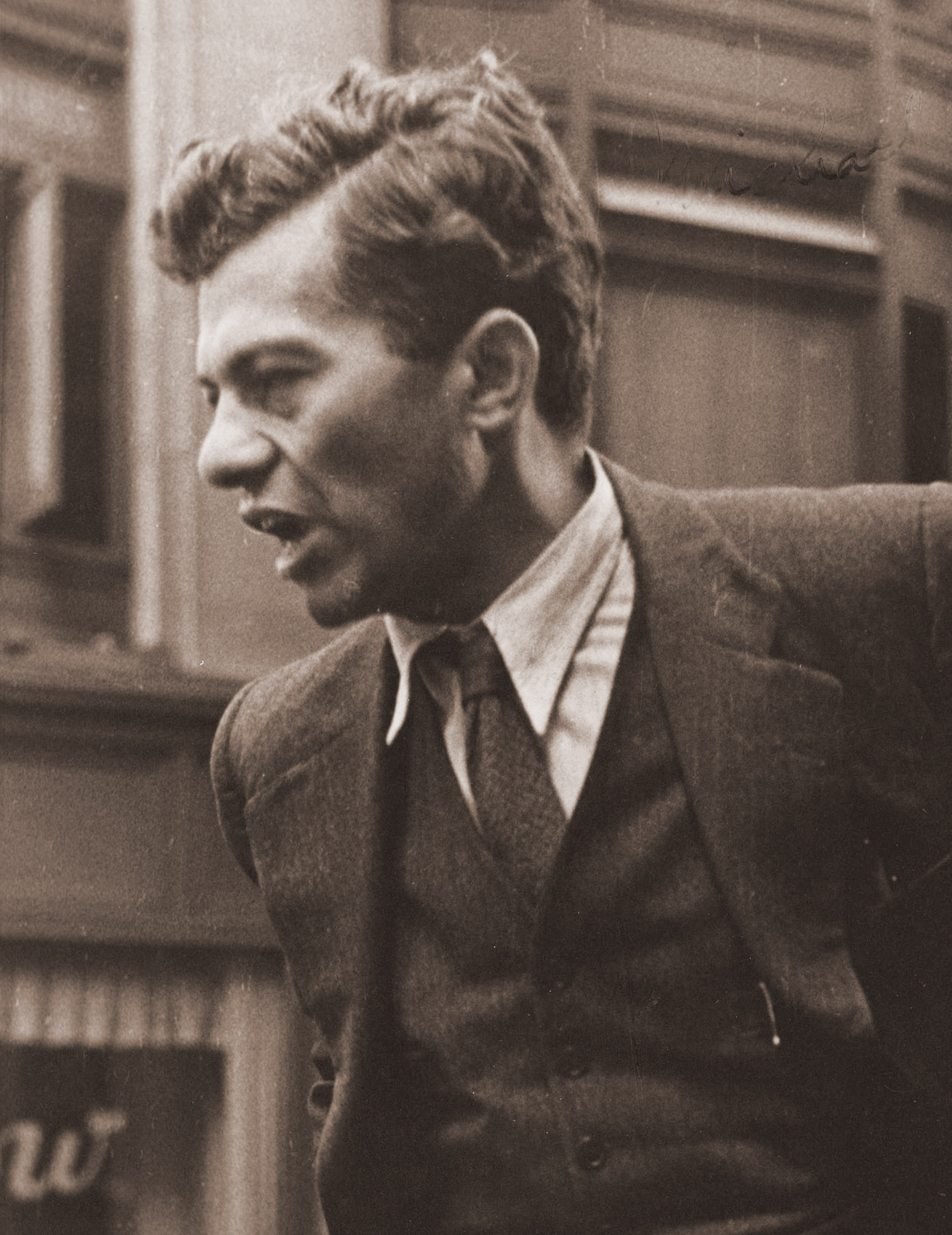
Michael Gold speaking to a New York crowd on May Day in the 1930s

The author was a lifelong communist and Jews without Money includes episodes with political messages. For example, it depicts a Zionist entrepreneur's cynical swindling of Herman, which has been interpreted as a left-wing critique of both American capitalism and of Zionism as a "bourgeois" movement that does not serve the interests of working-class Jews. (Note: Balthaser cites the episode in which the upwardly striving Herman Gold cultivates the company of wealthy Brooklyn Zionist leader Baruch Goldfarb. The latter is depicted as a bourgeois fraudster who preys on gullible lower-class Jews. Goldfarb offers Herman glowing prospects, a house in "God's country", a Jewish enclave in the suburbs, away from the multiethnic milieu he lives in and who gets him to join his gaudy, politicized fraternal lodge where vote-rigging and spying on labor unions is organized. Goldfarb and his associate, Zechariah Cohen, eventually wheedle Herman out of his money.(Balthaser 2020, pp. 449–450))

Patrick Chura notes how Jews without Money—in contrast to Horatio Alger-type "rags-to-riches" stories—"reverses the trajectory of the American narrative of upward mobility, recasting the national myth as a family tragedy." Herman starts out with heady dreams of business riches but then "descends into ever deeper poverty and ends his career as pushcart peddler [of bananas], the very job with which the greenest of Jewish immigrants often began life in the New World."

The broad outline of the novel parallels the author's own childhood, in which his father also became ill and bedridden and could no longer earn wages. Michael Gold also had to quit school early to take a series of unskilled, low-pay jobs. Jews without Money has been called "the education of a radical", and it ends with a Whitmanesque ode to revolution:

"O workers' Revolution, you brought hope to me, a lonely, suicidal boy. You are the true Messiah. You will destroy the East Side when you come, and build there a garden for the human spirit.
O Revolution, that forced me to think, to struggle and to live.
O great Beginning!"

== Reception and influence ==
Jews without Money was an immediate success, going through eleven reprints in the first year. It was translated into over a dozen languages. By 1950, it had been reprinted 25 times.

Appearing at the start of the radical 1930s, Jews without Money became a prototype for the American proletarian novel. Benjamin Balthaser claims that Gold's portrait of working-class Jewish life "inaugurated an entire cycle of novels about a racialized US working class, from Richard Wright's Lawd Today! about a black Chicago postal worker, to Pietro di Donato's Christ in Concrete about Italian immigrant construction workers, to H. T. Tsiang's And China Has Hands about laundry workers of Chinese descent in New York City. As critic Paula Rabinowitz framed it, Jews was taken to be 'a road marker to guide the proletarian literature that followed.'"

== "Author's Note" ==
In the 1935 reprint of Jews without Money, Michael Gold added an "Author's Note" that revealed some of his intentions for the novel. He wrote: "I have told in my book a tale of Jewish poverty in one ghetto, that of New York. The same story can be told of a hundred other ghettoes scattered over all the world. For centuries the Jew has lived in this universal ghetto. Yiddish literature is saturated with the ghetto melancholy and poverty."

In his years as a magazine editor and newspaper columnist, Gold had a reputation for being politically combative, and the novel's title itself was a political provocation. In the "Author's Note", he recounted an episode he heard from a German friend who had recently been arrested by Hitler's Brown Shirts:

My friend, a radical, expected a visit from the Brown Shirts, but as calmly as possible continued literary work. It happened that she was translating a chapter from my book, Jews Without Money, when armed Nazis finally broke in. The officer picked up some sheets of her manuscript, and read Jews Without Money. "Ho, ho, ho!" he roared. "So there are Jews without money!" And all the Brown Shirts laughed with him at the marvelous joke. How could there be Jews without money, when as every good Nazi knew with Hitler, Jews were all international bankers?

Gold said he was proud his book was "a form of propaganda against the Nazi anti-Semitic lies", and he saw those same lies gaining ground in 1930s America as well.

== See also ==
- Michael Gold
- Jewish-American working class
- Proletarian literature

== Sources ==
- Balthaser, Benjamin (June 2020). "When Anti-Zionism Was Jewish: Jewish Racial Subjectivity and the Anti-Imperialist Literary Left from the Great Depression to the Cold War". American Quarterly. 72 (2): 449–470. doi:10.1353/aq.2020.0019. S2CID 226699923.
