= Martin Koch (novelist) =

Swedish novelist (1882–1940)

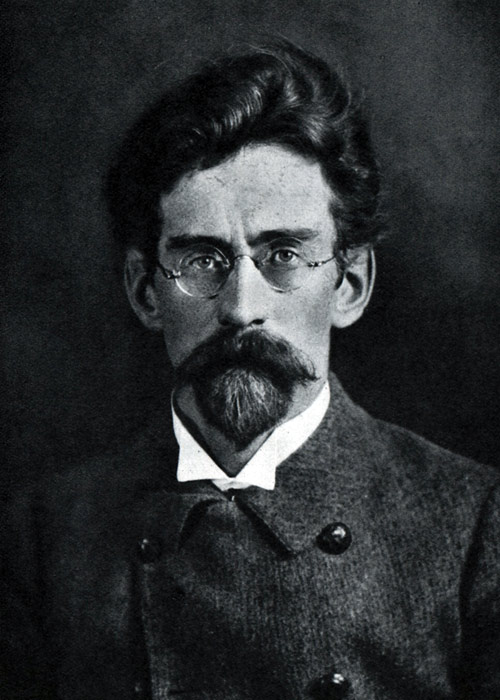
Martin Koch.

Martin Koch (23 December 1882 – 22 June 1940) was a Swedish novelist.

He was a key representative of the proletarian authors in Sweden.

== Works ==
- Ellen (1911)
- Arbetare (1912)
- Timmerdalen (1913)
- I Guds vackra värld (1916)
- Inte precis om kvinnorna (1918)
- Mauritz (1940)
