= A World to Win (Conroy novel) =

1930s American novel

- First edition
- Author: Jack Conroy
- Language: English
- Subject: Labor movement, unions
- Genre: Fiction
- Published: New York: Covici-Friede, 1935
- Publication place: United States
- Media type: Book
- Pages: 348
- ISBN: 9780252069277 (2000 ed)
- OCLC: 43851533

A World to Win is a novel written by Jack Conroy and published in 1935. It was republished in 2000. This novel, which is set before and during the Great Depression, follows two brothers through their lives both together and separately. One brother, Leo, represents the life of a working man, while the other, Robert, shows the life of a writer, a struggle that Conroy himself dealt with. Despite Robert being determined to be the brother who becomes famous for his writing, he does not. In fact Leo, who never seemed to have a plan, becomes "famous" first when he becomes a wanted man. Although the brothers have led very different lives, they end up together in the end when Robert decides to do something unplanned and free his brother from the police.

== Plot summary ==
Part One: Green Valley

In the beginning of the story, we are introduced to Martha Darrell of Green Valley, who is a single woman who is “past her prime” for dating. She is awoken one night by her doorbell and finds Terry Hurley and his sick child Leo. Martha lets the two stay until the child is better but the relationship blossoms and soon Robert is born. Later in his childhood, Martha starts to become more religious as her and Terry grow apart. Leo starts seeing a girl named Anna and Robert accidentally spills the details to a bully named Dogface. Dogface tells his father, Preacher Epperson, who gets Martha involved, and she comes down on Leo pretty hard. He leaves and Anna shortly follows.

Part Two: The Green Dragon

In anticipation of college Robert goes to visit Boone University that his grandfather was a professor at and his mother was a student. On a train to campus, he meets Alan Vass and Sol Abraham, two returning college students. When Robert goes to the University himself, he adopts many of the same attitudes Alan does. While at school, Robert meets Nell, his first and only love who is also a writer. She follows him after he leaves school and they start living together, he working on his novel and she encouraging him and working at an office responsible for busting up protests. It is at this point that Robert is called back to Green Valley because his mother is ill. After her death, Terry opens up to Robert more and asks that they stay in better touch. Leo comes back into Robert's life and Leo gets Robert a job at his mill. Robert really does not like the work but he struggles through. Later, the workers of that mill go on strike and come after Leo because they know he is the one that told management about their union plans. After not being pummeled like expected, Leo promises not to go into the mill again.

Part Three: Nothing to Lose

Now out of a job, Leo finds out Anna is pregnant. They decide to go back to Green Valley where they are sure things will be better. Meanwhile, Robert's manuscript is turned down and he leaves Nell because he is tired of living off her. Anna and the baby are killed in a car accident at which time Leo decides to make the world feel sorry for what they have been through. Instead, he becomes a wanted man and Robert comes to his rescue, freeing him from the law and renewing their relationship.

== Characters ==
Primary Characters

- Leo Hurley- Robert's older half brother, blue collar worker struggling to put food on the table for his family, later becomes politically radicalized.
- Robert Browning Hurley- Leo's younger half brother, intellectually confused about his destiny to become a famous author, but his destiny becomes clear when he and his brother become politically radicalized.

Secondary Characters

- Anna (Leischer) Hurley- Leo's wife, mother of five, dies during childbirth
- Martha Darrell- Wife of Terry, mother to Robert, failed writer altered by the Christian religion
- Terry Hurley- Husband to Martha, father to Leo, Irish immigrant blue-collar worker
- Alan Vass- Robert's college friend, thinks of himself as highly intellectual, has no success
- Monty Cass- Old mine worker known for murdering a man, killed in a collapsed mine
- Pastor Epperson- Fanatical Christian figure, converts Martha to the Christian religion
- Kurt Leischer- Anna's father, does not believe in God, abusive to the woman he keeps in his home, who he calls the Whore
- Nell Ravenel- Robert's girlfriend, supports Robert financially throughout most of the book
- Bishop Taylor- Mormon land owner who hired Terry and Leo to beet farm
- Sol Abraham- Robert's friend, helped lead the Workers’ Center in the hope of more rights for workers
- Fatfolks- Friend of Sol's, black worker supporting the Workers’ Center, killed heroically during a strike
- Danny Maupin- Friend of Robert's, successful author of Westerns

== Themes and criticism ==
Worker-Writer

The autobiographical element of the “worker-writer” is the underlying component of A World to Win. Conroy himself lived as a manual laborer by day and a writer by night and his life can be seen played out as the major thematical element of the novel in the characters of half-brothers Leo and Robert Hurley. Each brother representing one of these components, Leo the “worker” and Robert the “writer,” draws the novel from the opening descriptions of Martha through the brother's eventual conversions to radicalism at the novel's end. The challenge presented to Leo the worker throughout the novel were reflected in his role as provider. The majority of his adult life centered on keeping employment and all possible costs, regardless of low-wages or poor working conditions in order to support his wife and children. Robert as the writer spent his adult life working on poetry and attempting to write a novel while being supported by another individual. Each of the brothers struggles with these identities would eventually play a role in the conversion the characters undertook at the end of the novel.

Masculinity vs. Femininity

Amongst their personal struggles as “worker” and “writer” we also see Leo and Robert and their struggles with roles of masculinity and femininity in the Depression Era culture and the role this struggle plays in their development from childhood through adulthood. Leo, raised largely by his father followed a more traditional masculine role throughout the novel; from a childhood spent visiting hobo camps to become a manual laborer and father and provider of 5 children. Robert on the other hand was raised largely by his mother and followed what would be considered a more traditionally feminine life. Being kept away from manual labor and taught to become a writer at a young age by his mother, Robert would find himself later in life a man without work being supported by a woman whom he never married, nor fathered any children with.

Naturalism

As well, we also see Conroy employ the role of a literary style known as Naturalism (literature) in Leo and Robert's lives as seen through the societal structure of the Depression and how this eventually leads to their conversion to radicalism at novel's end. This role of Naturalism can be seen through the often hopeless nature of the Great Depression and the only realistic outcome for either Leo or Robert was to become radicalized based on their day-to-day experiences with both peer members of society and the un-seen elite such as Nell's boss Mr. Harrison.

Criticism

Although the novel portrayed the Hurley families’ struggles throughout the earlier years of the Depression, most criticisms of the book were not kind towards Conroy's use of this narrative style to explore the difficulties of the working class. “In her review of A World to Win for New Masses, Meridel Le Sueur suggested that Conroy had fallen victim to the, “seductiveness of bourgeois literature and its forms.”
