= Yoshiki Hayama =

Japanese writer

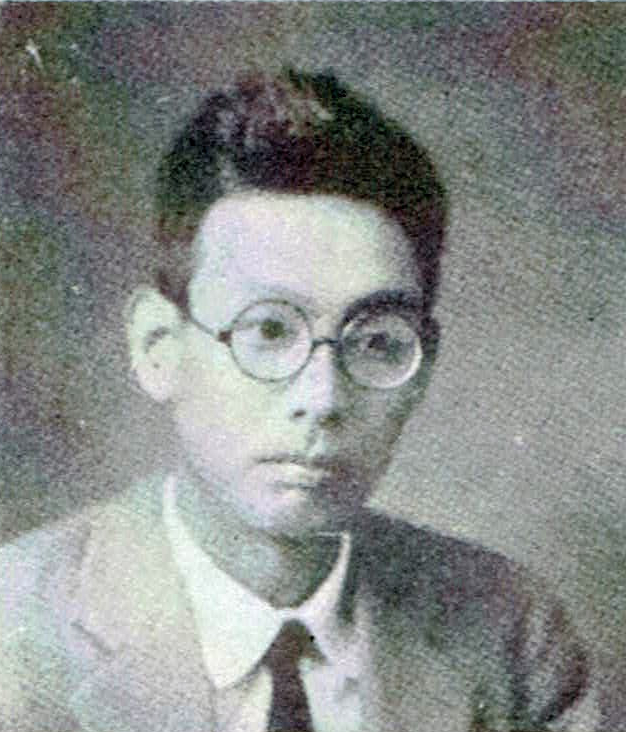
Yoshiki Hayama

Yoshiki Hayama (葉山 嘉樹, Hayama Yoshiki; March 12, 1894 – October 18, 1945) was a Japanese author associated with the Japanese proletarian literature movement.

He is perhaps best known for Men Who Live on the Sea (海に生くる人々, Umi ni Ikuru Hitobito), a 1926 novel about the appalling labor conditions on a cargo ship plying the Japan trade lanes, and for short stories such as The Prostitute (淫売婦, Imbaifu; 1925), an early example of proletarian literature in Japan.

He spent time in jail due to his involvement with the labor movement, but later turned away from Marxism and became an enthusiastic supporter of Japanese imperialism.

== See also ==
- Japanese literature
- List of Japanese writers
