= The Anvil (magazine) =

American magazine

The Anvil was an American literary and political activist magazine edited by Jack Conroy in the 1930s. The magazine had a leftist stance and was subtitled "Stories for Workers". According to Douglas C. Wixson, its story "would make an important chapter in the history of American literature if the 1930s were properly recognized in standard textbooks."

== History and profile ==
The Anvil was first published out of Moberly, Missouri, in May 1933 (ib.). Among the authors whose works appeared in the magazine were Langston Hughes, Richard Wright, Nelson Algren, Erskine Caldwell, Frank Yerby and Maxim Gorky.

In 1935, The Anvil was folded into the Partisan Review (ib., p. xIv), operating as The Partisan Review and Anvil until 1936. Conroy, speaking about the merger, said "I view The Anvil's death with keen regrets... I have no illusions about the character of the merged magazine. I will be Partisan Review, not Anvil".

In 1939, with the help of Nelson Algren, Conroy relaunched the magazine as The New Anvil.
