= Jack Conroy =

American writer (1899–1990)

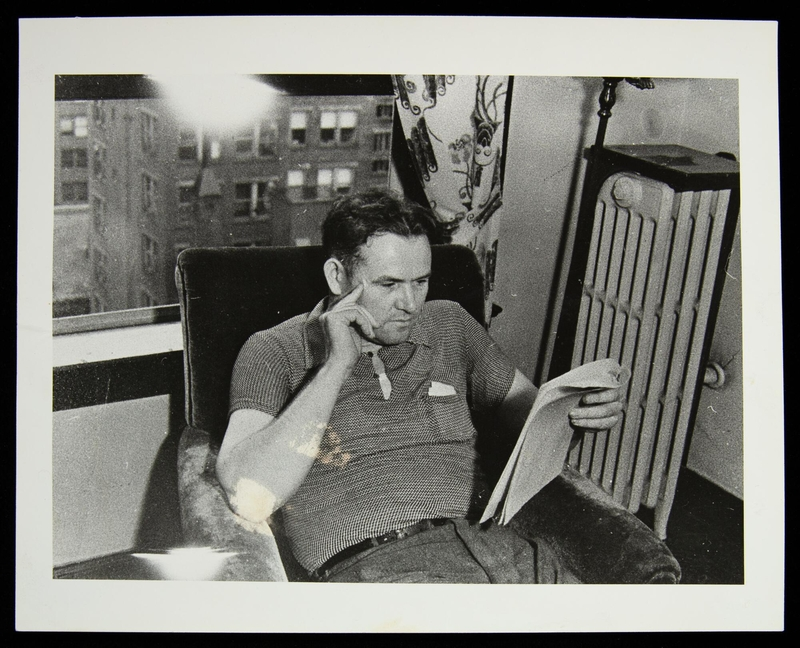
- Born: John Wesley Conroy; December 5, 1899; Monkey Nest, a coal mining camp near Moberly, Missouri, US
- Died: February 28, 1990 (aged 90); Moberly, Missouri, US
- Occupation: writer
- Writing career
- Pen name: Jack Conroy, Tim Brennan, John Norcross
- Language: English
- Period: 1933-1990
- Genre: proletarian literature
- Notable work: The Disinherited (1933)
- Notable awards: Guggenheim Fellowship, State of Illinois Literary Times Award, NEA artist’s grant, Society of Midland Authors Lifetime Achievement Award, Society for Midwestern Literature’s Mark Twain Award

John Wesley Conroy (December 5, 1899 – February 28, 1990) was a leftist American writer, also known as a worker-writer. He was best known for his contributions to proletarian literature: fiction and nonfiction about the life of American workers during the early decades of the 20th century.

== Background ==
"Jack" Conroy was born John Wesley Conroy to Irish immigrants on December 5, 1899, in the coal mining camp of Monkey Nest near Moberly, Missouri. Elements of his childhood experiences growing up in a mining camp can be seen in his Depression-era novels, The Disinherited and A World to Win.

== Career ==
Though he did not complete a formal education, Conroy worked at various jobs including: railroad shop apprentice (and eventual foreman), recording secretary for the Brotherhood of Railway Carmen of America union, an auto factory worker, and construction. While he worked, he wrote, and it is said that in 1934, during a heat wave, Conroy moved his kitchen table outdoors beneath a shade tree where he created his second novel, A World to Win.

From 1931 to 1941 Conroy edited successively the magazines Rebel Poet, The Anvil, and The New Anvil. He included works by Erskine Caldwell, Langston Hughes, and William Carlos Williams, among others. Conroy later edited, with Curt Johnson, a collection of these pieces, Writers in Revolt: The Anvil Anthology (1973). He also contributed to the New Masses magazine as writer and contributing editor; often, his work was reviewed in that magazine, too.

Conroy received a Guggenheim Fellowship in 1935 and gave an address at the First American Writers Congress. In 1936, he taught at Commonwealth College in Arkansas before protesting the Downs law in Alabama, then moved to St. Louis for a job with the Missouri Writers Project. He roomed with Joe Jones and associated with striking East St. Louis mill workers who were called "Fallonites" before quitting the project and moving back to Moberly in 1937.

In 1938 Conroy came to Chicago, on the suggestion of Nelson Algren, to work on the Illinois Writers' Project. Along with recording folktales and industrial folklore, Conroy was assigned to the black history portion of the IWP, and collaborated with Arna Bontemps, producing the pioneering Black studies works They Seek A City (1945) and Anyplace But Here (1965), both about African-American migration from the South to the North. Conroy and Bontemps also collaborated on several successful juvenile books based on folktales, including The Fast Sooner Hound (1942) and Slappy Hooper, The Wonderful Sign Painter (1946).

In 1965, Conroy moved from Chicago back to Moberly, Missouri, where he lived until his death. He continued to write into his 80s, publishing The Weed King and Other Stories in 1985. Over the course of his career, Conroy was also a teacher and lecturer and a mentor to younger radical writers. Known as "the Sage of Moberly", Conroy also wrote under the pseudonyms of Tim Brennan and John Norcross.

Conroy died February 28, 1990, in Moberly, Missouri, and was buried in Sugar Creek Cemetery.

== Legacy ==
Conroy has been credited with introducing the worker-writer in literature. His first novel, The Disinherited, challenged critical definitions of what was considered influential literature, blurring the line between the world of the middle-class literate and the world of the worker.

Conroy first achieved national attention when H.L. Mencken published his sketches and stories in The American Mercury magazine. He worked for 23 years as an editor of an encyclopedia sold through Sears stores and as a book reviewer for the Chicago Sun and the Daily Defender. In the United States, awareness of his work diminished after the 1930s for a variety of reasons, including the difficulty Conroy faced in trying to establish himself as a writer while staying loyal to his identity as a worker. In the 1960s, new interest in the lives of workers revived interest in Conroy's life and writings. His works enjoyed more popularity in the Soviet Union: a Russian translation of The Disinherited appeared in 1935 and was warmly greeted by Soviet magazines, and in 1990 Soviet sources offered the opinion that Conroy's novels truly describe the reality of working-class America.

== Major works ==
=== Fiction ===
- The Disinherited (1933) reflects Conroy's own life as it tells the story of a work-seeking coal miner's son during the Great Depression.
- A World to Win (1935) is a proletarian novel that follows two brothers as they seek their own definitions of worldly success during the Great Depression.

=== Nonfiction ===
- The Weed King and Other Stories (1985) is a collection of tales reflecting Conroy's life and personality

=== Magazines ===
- Founded The Anvil (1933) - a literary magazine that published authors such as Richard Wright, Meridel LeSueur, Erskine Caldwell, James T. Farrell, Nelson Algren, and August Derleth. The magazine's slogan was “We Prefer Crude Vigor to Polished Banality.” After being taken over by Communist officials and merged with the Partisan Review, it was later republished as The New Anvil.
- Edited The New Anvil (1938–1942) with Nelson Algren, an attempt to revive the working class magazine, The Anvil. Contributing writers included Frank Yerby, Karl Shapiro, Langston Hughes, and William Carlos Williams.
- Co-edited New Masses magazine (1930–1933).

=== Collaborations ===
Conroy wrote a number of books with Arna Bontemps, including:

- The Fast Sooner Hound (1942), children's book, first of three that paints a picture of African-American migration and settlement.
- They Seek A City (1945) children's book, second of three on the northern migration of African-Americans, both pre- and post-Civil War.
- Slappy Hooper, The Wonderful Sign Painter (1946), third of three, folktales
- Sam Patch, The High, Wide and Handsome Jumper (1951)
- Midland Humor: A Harvest of Fun and Folklore (1947)
- Anyplace But Here (1966) is a republished version of They Seek A City. This expanded version adds chapters on Marcus Garvey, the Black Muslims, Malcolm X, and other racial issues.

=== Editing ===
- Edited Unrest (1929–1931) with Ralph Cheyney
- Edited The Rebel Poet (1931–1932)
- Senior editor for The New Standard Encyclopedia (1947)
- Edited Writers in Revolt: The Anvil Anthology (1973) with Curt Johnson

== Awards ==
Conroy's awards and recognition include:

- Guggenheim Fellowship, 1935
- Literary Times Award, State of Illinois, 1967
- Society of Midland Authors James L. Dow Award for Anyplace But Here, 1967
- Rabinowitz grant to write his autobiography
- Missouri Literary Association, Literary Award, 1969
- Honorary Doctor of Humane Letters, University of Missouri at Kansas City, 1975
- National Endowment for the Arts, Artist's grant (1978)
- Mark Twain Award, Society for the Midwestern Literature, 1980
- Recognition by the Missouri Senate, 1984
- City of Moberly, Jack Conroy Day, May 22, 1985
- Society of Midland Authors Award for Lifetime Achievement, 1986
- Lifetime Membership, Missouri Folklore Society
- “A True Friend of Working People”, Central Missouri Labor Council, AFL-CIO and all the working men and women of Mid-Missouri
