= The Disinherited (novel) =

1933 proletarian novel by Jack Conroy

- First edition
- Author: Jack Conroy
- Language: English
- Genre: Autobiographical novel, Proletarian literature
- Publisher: Covici-Friede
- Publication date: 1933 (1st edition)
- Publication place: United States
- Media type: Print (hardback & paperback)
- Pages: 246 pp (1991 University of Missouri paperback)
- ISBN: 0-8262-0770-7
- OCLC: 22346727
- Dewey Decimal: 813/.52 20
- LC Class: PS3505.O53 D5 1991

The Disinherited is a 1933 proletarian novel written by Jack Conroy. Conroy wrote it initially as nonfiction, but editors insisted he fictionalize the story for better audience reception. The novel explores the 1920s and 30s worker experience through the eyes of Larry Donovan.

== Plot ==
Monkey Nest Camp

The Disinherited is heard through the voice of Larry Donovan, a young boy, growing up in the Monkey Nest coal mine camp. It is a difficult life, and after Larry's brother Dan starts working in the mines, Larry's father prods Larry to do well in school so he too won't have to go into the mines. Larry makes many observations about the differences between miner families and other families, especially farmer Ben Haskins and his daughter Bonny Fern. Larry throws a dirt clod at Bonny Fern's head one day and the next tries to give her a flower. She calls him “camp trash” and Ben chases Larry away.

Larry also distinguishes differences between the miners themselves. His father and his father's friend, “Frenchy” are both educated. So is Lionel Stafford, but Larry's father doesn't get along with Mr. Stafford. Lionel flaunts his education whereas Larry's father does not.

One day the mine owner, Edward Stacpoole, comes to the mine with his wife and son. The son pushes Larry's sister, Madge, into a mud puddle and taunts her.

Dan is hurt in a mining accident and dies three days later. Frenchy also dies in a separate mining accident.

The camp miner's go on strike, and Larry's father meets unsuccessfully with Mr. Stacpoole to negotiate. One night during a storm a strikebreaker knocks on the Donovan's door seeking shelter. Tom punches him in the mouth and sends him away. Tom tells his children never to become scabs. Eventually, the miners go back to work.

Aunt Jessie comes to take Larry to the house of a dead man; she asks Larry if Rollie Weems ever talks about her. Larry says that he does but plays innocent. At the dead man's house, Aunt Jessie forces Larry to touch the man's face. Afterwards, Larry suffers nightmares about the dead man.

Larry's father takes a more dangerous job within the mine in order to make more money to pay for Larry's schooling. However, there is an accident while Mike Riordan and Tom are in the mine. Larry's father dies, and without an income Mother begins to take in others’ laundry. One of Mother's customers is the butcher's wife, Mrs. Koch, who is very particular about her laundry. Larry stains a load of her clothing and Mother takes the blame.

Rollie Weems leaves town after rumors start that he got Mattie Perkins pregnant.

Mike Riordan, who had disappeared following Tom's funeral, reappears and periodically leaves groceries on the Donovan's porch. When the mine goes on strike again, the superintendent approaches Mother about cooking for the strikebreakers; Mother refuses on principle. Rollie Weems returns to say he has gotten work at a railroad; since Larry is of working age now, Rollie recommends that Larry get a job at the railroad also.

Bull Market

Larry starts going to night school and also gets a job at the railroad, where he becomes friends with Ed Warren. Ed introduces Larry to Wilma and Larry has his first experience with sex, which he reacts to with disgust.

American involvement with World War I begins. Rollie Weems enlists and marries Aunt Jessie before going on tour. A baby is born to the newlyweds while he is France.

A man speaks in the town square denouncing war and capitalism. Lionel Stafford joins in and the crowd attacks the two men, beating them very badly. Afterwards the Stafford's leave town defeated.

During this time Madge dies.

Ed enlists after making several attempts to join the army. Larry stays away from the war he calls “cruel.” Ed sends Bonny Fern letters, and she approaches Larry to ask about Ed.

When the soldiers return from war, the railroad goes on strike. Ed returns and moves to Detroit with the Haskins. Rollie emerges as a leader in the strike. During a conversation between him and Larry, he propounds the advantages of staying single. Larry listens and seems to remember Rollie's advice throughout the narrative. One evening, Rollie starts a fight with a strikebreaker and is shot. He tells Larry to pretend the fight hadn't happened. Rollie crashes his car into a streetlight and dies.

After Rollie's death, Larry gets a job at a steel mill which begins a series, throughout the novel, of Larry getting and losing jobs. At the steel mill, Larry meets several people, including an old man the workers call “Bun” Grady. Grady is homeless and unable to get many jobs because of his age.

Larry rooms at the home of Nat Moore. Nat's wife Lena is sickly and often places Larry in uncomfortable situations. Larry finds a job at the rubber plant and meets Hans, a German worker, and Jasper, a prankster of sorts. Larry dates Helen, the lunch girl.

Larry receives many letters from Ed in Detroit encouraging him to move to Detroit. Ed finally accepts the offer, along with Jasper and Nat, after Lena dies. Nat has also been remarried to Emma, his former cleaning lady, though he plans to send for her after he gets a job.

Larry rooms with the Haskins and gets a job at the auto factory. Bonny Fern now takes college classes and Larry takes note of how the classes and the city have affected her. She influences him in the proletarian movement.

Getting word that Helen is in Detroit, Larry follows her to a whorehouse that is disguised as a lunch counter. He requests Helen who has become a prostitute. She shares her feelings about him, and mildly drunk, Larry reacts oddly. There is a scene and Larry is thrown out.

Nat has sent for his family and has bought a plot of land to build a house on. However he doesn't yet have enough money to build. In the meantime, he begins making homebrew which upsets Emma. Bonny Fern also expresses disgust when Larry drinks.

The Hard Winter

The Stock Market crashes and men from the auto factory are laid off. Ed and Larry bounce from job to job. The Haskins decide to go back to the farm, though the decision distresses Bonny Fern.

After being gone for some time, Bonny Fern sends Larry a letter detailing his mother's poor living conditions. Larry and Ed buy a car and head to Monkey Nest Camp. The car is a clunker, and the boys must get jobs to pay for repairs. When they reach the camp, they find Mother, Aunt Jessie, and the kids nearly starved and living in Liam Ryan's old barroom. Larry is shocked at the physical degeneration of his once pretty Aunt Jessie and his mother. After fixing a leaky roof and buying the family groceries, Ed and Larry look for work.

While lying pipeline they meet a half-wit who they deduce to be Willy Stafford. It seems his once uppity older brother, Paul Stafford, has been buried alive working in the pipeline ditch.

Bonny Fern is friendly with Larry but he recalls again the advice of Rollie and keeps his distance.

In conversation, Mother tells Larry to be a fighter like his father was.

Nat and his family show up, as does Hans.

Ben Haskin's farm is repossessed and is set to be sold piece by piece in an auction. Well-meaning farmers come to the auction and refuse to bid. Hans and a sheriff get involved. Eventually one farmer sells the farm and goods back to Ben Haskins for 99 cents.

Larry decides to go West with Hans. Mother and Bonny Fern wave good-bye as the Moore family, Hans, Ed, and Larry drive off.

== Characters ==
Main characters

- Larry Donavon – The main character of the story
- Bonny Fern Haskins – Ben's daughter; she is the object of Larry's affection throughout the book; when her family moves to Detroit she attends college and gets Larry interested in the socialist movement
- Ed Warren – Railroad worker; he becomes friends with Larry and they travel together looking for work
- Rollie Weems – a miner/soldier/railroad man; marries Aunt Jessie; he supports the railroad strike and is later killed by a scab

Ancillary characters

- Mike Riordan – Peg-leg sailor turned miner who is with Larry's father during a mine accident
- Dan Donavon – Larry's brother who dies in the mines
- Tom Donavon – Larry's father
- Mother – Larry's mother
- Lionel Stafford – lives at the camp but is scared of the mine; later he leaves town when others don't agree with his radical ideas
- Ben Haskins, farmer
- Madge – Larry's sister
- Edward Stacpoole – Monkey Nest Camp owner
- Paul Stafford – son of Lionel; he is also scared of the mines though later is buried alive while working to lay pipeline
- Willy Stafford – the epileptic youngest son of Lionel
- Mrs. Stafford – Lionel's overbearing wife
- Frenchy Barbour (Marcel) – a friend of Tom Donavon
- Fred Dobson – the Donovan's landlord
- Aunt Jessie – Larry's aunt; she marries Rollie Weems
- Koch – the butcher; Mother does Mrs. Koch's laundry
- Liam Ryan – saloon owner
- Wilma – a young girl that Ed sets Larry up with
- Robert Lee (Bun) Grady – an older man Larry meets while working in the steel factory
- Nat Moore – takes Larry in as a boarder; after his wife Lena dies he goes with Larry to Detroit
- Lena Moore – sickly wife of Nat
- Hans – a German worker Larry first meets at the rubber plant; Hans is full of Marxist ideology and at the end of the story, he sets off with Larry
- Jasper Collins, – a friend Larry also meets at the rubber plant and later travels to Detroit with; Jasper enjoys teasing Hans
- Emma Hallen – the Moore's widowed cleaning lady; Nat marries her after Lena's death
- Helen – Lunch girl; she dates Larry and later moves to Detroit where she becomes a prostitute

== Reception and criticism ==
"The Disinherited isn’t really a novel, as some critics have said. I agree with that. Novel or not, just so it tells the truth. I describe myself as a witness to the times, not as a novelist. And that’s what I prefer to be known as.” – Jack Conroy

The Disinherited, Jack Conroy's first novel, was released in November 1933, after being rejected by twelve publishers. Once it was accepted by Covici-Friede in April 1933, it was only accepted subject to revision. Once Conroy made the suggested revisions, the book was released to mixed reviews . Part of the reason for this reception was that many critics weren't sure exactly how to judge Conroy's first novel. Critics tended to review The Disinherited using conventional literary standards. But Conroy's novel does not solely align itself with the tradition of literary realism; it is also what Conroy himself calls “fictional documentation”

One of the major criticisms of The Disinherited is its broken threads of narrative . The varying elements of the story never come together to support one unifying purpose. The novel is more a string of events, some of greater importance than others, but all present nonetheless . However, these broken threads lend themselves to the realism of the novel. Characters come in and out of the story in much the same way that people came into and out of Conroy's life as a migratory worker, moving from job to job

Another criticism of The Disinherited was to write this novel off as propaganda. The novel suggests that freedom must be achieved through responsible collective action, not through individual virtue alone. In most naturalistic fiction, one must leave their tragic life behind, to remain within that life to work for change sounds like propaganda (Wixson 22). But Conroy did remain within that life, and because he remained in that position as worker-writer, he held true to his point of view that acted as the subject of his writing, and this contributed to energize his literary work.

Despite these criticisms, many feel that The Disinherited is a notable achievement because it was one of the first works of proletarian fiction to be written from a working class, firsthand experience. This is an arguable position, however, due to the fact that there is no singular definition of proletarian literature. Some believe it is simply literature written about the working class; some believe it is instead written for the working class, or by someone from the working class. Whatever the definition, most of the so-called proletarian fiction in the 1930s was written by middle class authors who had lost faith in capitalism and were interested in dramatizing the “coming struggle for power” However, once the Great Depression began to weigh heavily on the American landscape—unemployment, evictions, strikes, etc.—writing about these conditions hit home, and became legitimate subjects for literary works. Works like The Disinherited opened a new class of literary realism and helped break down the barriers between literate and illiterate America

== Relevant historical events ==
1905 The US Supreme Court decides Lochner v. New York, setting a precedent that lasts until 1934. This decision made it difficult for state governments as well as the federal to enact laws regulating working conditions, such as limiting the number of hours in a work week or requiring a minimum wage. Teddy Roosevelt takes office; the Russian Empire is soundly defeated by the Japanese in a bid to enlarge Russian territory. The novel opens in Monkey Nest Camp, a coal mining community, most likely set in northern Missouri, where Conroy lived as a boy. Larry Donovan, Conroy’s alter ego, is nine years old.

April 1917 The United States enters World War I on the side of Britain and France after discovering that Germany is trying to persuade Mexico to enter the war as Germany's ally. Larry now works at the railroad yard. His friend and co-work, Ed Warden, introduces Larry to the pleasures of womanly flesh by setting him up with Wilma, an experienced fifteen-year-old girl. Larry is not quite eighteen years old since he is too young to enlist.

Early 1918 A devastating influenza pandemic sweeps the United States and the rest of the world. It appears to have originated in Kansas and causes 50 million deaths worldwide. Larry’s sister Madge dies of the disease.

Nov. 1918 Armistice is declared; World War I is over, with Germany the loser. Over forty million casualties, about half of those fatalities, are suffered between both sides. Ed, who serves in Europe, returns a changed man after seeing horrific things. He begins to show interest in Bonny Fern, the girl for whom Larry has unresolved feelings.

1918 German Revolution takes place after Germany's defeat in World War I. This results in the dissolution of the monarchy, the formation of the Weimar Republic, leading eventually to Hitler’s rise to power. Larry befriends Hans, who participated in the revolution, while working in the steel mill. Hans’s viewpoints influence Larry’s own.

1920 Prohibition begins in the U. S. and lasts until 1933. Ed writes Larry, inviting him to come to Detroit, where jobs are plentiful at the automobile factories.

1921 Herbert Hoover is made Secretary of Commerce under President Warren G. Harding. He serves until 1928, when he is elected President. Hoover declares at one point that poverty will be eliminated in the U. S. Larry changes from job to job, factory to factory, in search of the elusive American Dream.

October 1929 The stock market crash occurs despite Hoover’s promises of prosperity. Larry returns home to Monkey Nest Camp to help his mother as well as Bonny Fern’s father through the “Hard Winter.” Larry decides that he must follow Hans to fight for the proletariat.

July 1932 The 'July Riot' in St. Louis saw more than a thousand workers march to City Hall and a dozen protestors occupied the Mayor's office. Communist Party USA members attempted negotiations and Black women led the escalation when negotiations were denied. Larry is told by a labor organizer about some 15,000 people have marched on the St. Louis mayor’s office, the police threw tear-gas bombs into the crowd, but the workers stood their ground
