= Takiji Kobayashi =

Japanese writer

- 小林 多喜二
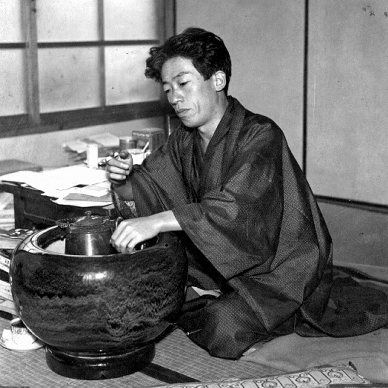
- Born: October 13, 1903; Odate, Akita, Japan
- Died: February 20, 1933 (aged 29); Tokyo, Japan
- Occupation: Writer
- Writing career
- Genre: Novels
- Movement: Proletarian literature

Takiji Kobayashi (小林 多喜二, Kobayashi Takiji; October 13, 1903 – February 20, 1933) was a Japanese writer of proletarian literature. He is best known for his short novel Kani Kōsen, or Crab Cannery Ship, published in 1929. It tells the story of the hard life of cannery workers, fishermen and seamen on board a cannery ship and the beginning of their revolt against the company and its managers. Kobayashi died due to violent torture after being arrested by the Special Higher Police two years later, at the age of 29.

== Biography ==
Kobayashi was born in Odate, Akita, Japan. At the age of four, his family moved to Otaru, Hokkaido. The family was not wealthy, but Kobayashi's uncle paid his schooling expenses and he was able to attend Hokkaido Otaru Commercial High School and Otaru Commercial School of Higher Learning, which is the current Otaru University of Commerce. While studying, he became interested in writing, and submitted essays to literary magazines, served in the editorial committee for his school's alumni association magazine, and also had his own writing published. One of his teachers at school was economist, critic, and poet Nobuyuki Okuma. Around this time, due to financial hardship and the current economic recession of the time, he joined the labour movement.

After graduating from school, he worked in the Otaru branch of the Hokkaido Takushoku Bank. In the 1928 general election, Kobayashi helped with election candidate Kenzo Yamamoto's campaign, and went to Yamamoto's campaign speech in a village at the base of Mount Yōtei. This experience was later incorporated into his book Higashikutchankō (東倶知安行). In the same year, his story March 15, 1928 (based on the March 15 incident) was published in the literary magazine Senki ("Standard of Battle" in Japanese). The story depicted torture by the Tokkō special higher police, which in turn infuriated government officials.

In 1929, Kobayashi's novel Kanikōsen about a crab-fishing and canning ship's crew determined to stand up to a cruel manager under harsh conditions was published in Senki. It quickly gained attention and notoriety, and became a standard-bearer of Marxist proletarian literature. In July of that year, it was adapted into a theatrical performance and was performed at the Imperial Garden Theater under the title North of latitude 50 degrees north (北緯五十度以北). The full text of Kanikōsen, now the length of a short novel, was not available in Japan until 1948. Kanikōsen was subsequently published three times translated into English as The Cannery Boat (1933), The Factory Ship (1973), and The Crab Cannery Ship (2013), as well as in other languages.

Also in 1929, Kobayashi published The Absentee Landlord, after having worked on several versions. This book describes the hard life of local or immigrant tenant farmers on the northern island of Hokkaido, and their struggle with the way they are treated by rich landowners, as Japan was making efforts to strengthen its colonization of this island and to develop its agriculture and industry. The story is located in the unnamed village of 'S.', close to the town of Asahikawa, along the Ishikari River valley, about 80 miles North East of Otaru where Kobayashi was living.

The police (in particular the Tokubetsu Kōtō Keisatsu or Tokkō) marked Kobayashi for surveillance, and in the same year the publication of his new book "Absentee Landlord" (不在地主, Fuzaijinushi) in the Chūōkōron magazine became grounds for his dismissal from his job at the bank.

In the spring of 1930, Kobayashi moved to Tokyo and became the secretary general of the Proletarian Writer's Guild of Japan. On May 23 he was arrested on suspicion of giving financial support to the Japanese Communist Party, and was temporarily released on June 7. After returning to Tokyo on June 24, he was again arrested and in July, due to Kanikōsen he was further indicted on charges of Lèse majesté. In August, he was prosecuted under the Public Order and Police Law of 1900 and was imprisoned in Toyotama Penitentiary. On January 22, 1931, he was released on bail. He then secluded himself at the Nanasawa Hot Spring in Kanagawa Prefecture. In October 1931, Kobayashi officially became a member of the outlawed Japan Communist Party.

In November, he visited the house of Naoya Shiga in Nara Prefecture, and in the spring of 1932, he went underground.

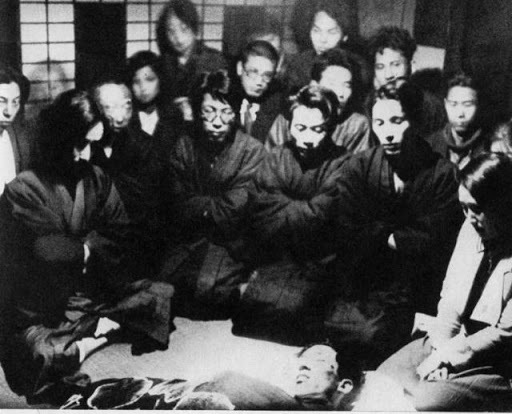
Kobayashi's corpse (bottom of frame) at the Tsukiji Police Station, surrounded by friends

On February 20, 1933, Kobayashi went to a meeting spot in Akasaka to meet with a fellow Communist Party member, who turned out to be a Tokkō spy who had infiltrated the party. The Tokkō were lying in wait for him, and although he tried to escape, he was captured and arrested. Kobayashi was taken to Tsukiji Police Station, where he was tortured. Police authorities announced the following day that Kobayashi had died of a heart attack. No hospital would perform an autopsy for fear of the Tokkō.

== Legacy ==
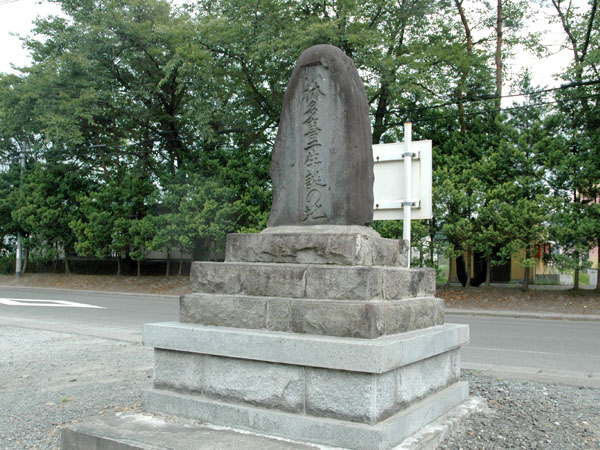
Memorial monument for Takiji Kobayashi, in front of Shimokawazoi Station in Odate, Akita

=== 2008 bestseller ===
In 2008, Kanikōsen became a surprise bestseller thanks to an advertising campaign linking the novel to the working poor.

=== Translations ===
Kobayashi's principal works have been translated into numerous languages, including Russian, Chinese, English, Korean, Spanish, Basque, Italian, Portuguese, German, French, Polish, Czech, Swedish and Norwegian.

In 1933, The Cannery Boat and other Japanese short stories was published by the International Publishers in New York. The anonymous translator was William Maxwell "Max" Bickerton. Because of censorship, the translation of the title text (Kanikōsen) is incomplete, comprising slightly more than half of the original. The full text of the novel did not become available in Japan until 1948.

In 1973, an English translation of Kobayashi's two novels by Frank Motofuji under the titles The Factory Ship (Kanikōsen) and The Absentee Landlord (Fuzai jinushi) was published by the University of Tokyo Press under sponsorship from UNESCO.

In 2013, The Crab Cannery Ship and Other Novels of Struggle was published by the University of Hawaii Press. In addition to a new translation of the title text (Kanikōsen), the book includes Yasuko and Life of a Party Member (Tōseikatsusha). The introduction is by Yōichi Komori, professor of Japanese literature at Tokyo University. The translator is Željko Cipriš.

In 2013, "Kani Kosen: Sebuah Revolusi" was published by the Jalasutra Publisher, Indonesia as an Indonesia version of Takijis work, Kani Kosen.

The Crab Cannery Ship ('Le bateau-usine') and The Absentee Landlord (Le propriétaire absent) were published in French in 2010 and 2017 respectively.

=== Takiji Sai ===
The Otaru Takiji-sai Jikko Iinkai is a coterie of Takiji Kobayashi's admirers. They organized an 80th anniversary commemorating Kobayashi's death in Hokkaido. Amongst those who attended the 80th anniversary was Norma Field. Katsuo Terai serves as chairman of the Takiji-sai. The larger Takiji Sai tend to be in locales that were important to Takiji's life like Otaru, Akita, and the Greater Tokyo Suginami-Nakano-Shibuya Memorials. Takiji Sai are evening events, and feature a musical program as well as talks on Takiji's life and works.

=== Suite Slaughter ===
Suite Slaughter (Kumikyoku Gyakusatsu) is a musical written by Inoue Hisashi, and depicts Kobayashi from the time he was picked up for questioning in Osaka in May 1930 till his death three years later. The play opened on 3 October 2009 at the Galaxy Theater (Ginga Gekijō) at Tennozu Isle in Tokyo. After “Suite Slaughter” closes at the Galaxy Theater on Oct. 25, it plans to travel to the Hyogo Performing Arts Center in Nishinomiya, and the Kawanishicho Friendly Plaza in Yamagata. According to The Japan Times, “Suite Slaughter” premiered successfully in its premiere in October 2009 and picked up several prestigious awards.

=== Takiji Library ===
A Takiji Library was established by Sano Chikara, a businessman who graduated from Kobayashi's alma mater, Otaru University of Commerce. The Takiji Library became a centralized source of information. It sponsored the publication of ten books, including a manga version of "The Cannery Ship". The Takiji Library, together with Otaru University, co-sponsored a series of international symposia. The Takiji Library, and the Otaru University for Commerce, co-sponsored an essay contest on "The Cannery Ship".

=== Strike the Hour, Takiji ===
Strike the Hour, Takiji is a documentary film on Kobayashi's life. It was released in 2005.

=== Otaru Literary Museum ===
The Otaru Literary Museum features several Japanese writers, including Takiji Kobayashi. Takiji's bronze death mask is located in the Otaru Literary Museum. Tamagawa Kaoru, the curator of the museum, states that the museum has had a bump in attendance from the “Kani kosen boom”.

=== Tourism ===
The "Kani kosen boom" has brought about a tangible excitement to Otaru city, a city that boasts of Takiji Kobayashi's grave, claiming to be his hometown. There are books that describe Takiji “literary walks” for fans to retrace places of significance to Takiji Kobayashi. As a result of the “Kani kosen boom”, there is also a Japan Tourist Bureau bus tour. The tour starts at the Otaru Literary Museum, a museum that features Takiji, and other Japanese writers. The bus tours around Otaru, and makes a visit to the gravesite of Takiji Kobayashi.

=== Takiji Kobayashi Literary Monument ===
On October 9, 1965, the Takiji Kobayashi Literary Monument was unveiled. The unveiling was held at the Asahi observatory overlooking Otaru City. The monument was built by Japanese sculptor Hongo Shin.

== Works ==
- Kanikōsen, University of Hawaii Press (January 31, 2013), ISBN 0824837428, ISBN 978-0824837426
- March 15, 1928 (based on the March 15 incident)
- Yasuko
- Life of a Party Member
- The Absentee Landlord. Translated in English in "The factory ship" and "The absentee landlord" in UNESCO collection of representative works: Japanese series - University of Washington Press; First American edition (1973), ISBN 0295952857, ISBN 978-0295952857
- ”The Dogs That Kill Men”

== See also ==
- Political dissidence in the Empire of Japan

== Bibliography ==
- Keene, Donald (1998). Dawn to the West: Japanese Literature of the Modern Era - Fiction. Columbia University Press. ISBN 9780231114349.
- Bowen-Struyk, Heather; Field, Norma, eds. (2016). For Dignity, Justice, and Revolution: An Anthology of Japanese Proletarian Literature. University of Chicago Press. ISBN 9780226068374.
- The Crab Cannery Ship and Other Novels of Struggle. Translated by Cipris, Zeljko. University of Hawai’i Press. 2013. ISBN 9780824837426.
