= Proletarian literature =

Literature mainly written for or by the working class

Proletarian literature refers here to the literature created by left-wing writers mainly for the class-conscious proletariat. Though the Encyclopædia Britannica states that because it "is essentially an intended device of revolution", it is therefore often published, though not necessarily written, by Communist Party or left-wing sympathizers, the proletarian novel has also been categorized without any emphasis on revolution, as a novel "about the working classes and working-class life; perhaps with the intention of making propaganda". This different emphasis may reflect a difference between Russian, American and other traditions of working-class writing, with that of Britain. The British tradition was not especially inspired by the Communist Party, but had its roots in the Chartist movement, and socialism, amongst others. Furthermore, writing about the British working-class writers, H Gustav Klaus, in The Socialist Novel: Towards the Recovery of a Tradition (1982) suggested that "the once current [term] 'proletarian' is, internationally, on the retreat, while the competing concepts of 'working-class' and 'socialist' continue to command about equal adherence".

The word proletarian is also used, more narrowly, to describe works about the working class by working-class authors, to distinguish them from works by middle-class authors such as Charles Dickens (Hard Times), John Steinbeck (The Grapes of Wrath), and Henry Green (Living). William Blake (1757–1827) was also of the middle-class, but some of his works are early examples of working-class literature, including the two "The Chimney Sweeper" poems, published in Songs of Innocence in 1789 and Songs of Experience in 1794, which deal with the subject of child labour.

== Proletarian novel ==
The proletariat are members of the working class. The proletarian novel is a subgenre of the novel, written by workers mainly for other workers. It overlaps and sometimes is synonymous with the working-class novel, socialist novel, social problem novel (also problem novel or sociological novel or social novel), propaganda or thesis novel, and socialist realism novel.

The proletarian novel may comment on political events, systems and theories, and is frequently seen as an instrument to promote social reform or political revolution among the working classes. Proletarian literature is created especially by communist, socialist, and anarchist authors. It is about the lives of poor, and the period 1930 to 1945 in particular produced many such novels. However, there were works before and after these dates. In Britain the term working class literature, novel etc. is more generally used. The intention of the writers of proletarian literature is to lift the workers from the slums, by inspiring them to embrace the possibilities of social change or a political revolution.

== By country ==
=== Australia ===
Australian authors who have contributed to proletarian literature have typically been affiliated with the Communist Party of Australia or the Australian Labor Party. Some prominent proletarian fiction authors include Frank Hardy (Power Without Glory) and David Ireland (The Unknown Industrial Prisoner about factory workers in Western Sydney).

=== France ===
Two leading French writers who were born into the working class were Jean Giono (1895–1970) and Henry Poulaille (1896–1980).

Jean Giono was the son of a cobbler and a laundry woman, who spent most of his life in Manosque, Alpes-de-Haute-Provence. He was a voracious reader but had to leave school at sixteen to work in a bank to help support his family. He published his first novel Colline in 1929, which won him the Prix Brentano and $1000, and an English translation of the book, he left the bank in 1930 to devote himself to writing on a full-time basis.

The novels Giono published during the nineteen-thirties are set in Provence, with peasants as protagonists, and displaying a pantheistic view of nature. Marcel Pagnol based three of his films on Giono's work of this period: Regain, with Fernandel and music by Honegger, Angèle, and La Femme du boulanger, with Raimu.

After World War II he planned on writing a sequence of ten novels inspired by Balzac’s La Comédie humaine, in which he would depict characters from all strata of society rather than peasants, and contrast different moments in history by depicting the experiences of members of the same family a hundred years apart. But Giono only completed the four Hussard novels, Mort d’un personnage (1948)), Le Hussard sur le Toit (1951), Le Bonheur fou (1957), Angelo (1958).

Henry Poulaille was the son of a carpenter and cane worker, who was orphaned at fourteen. In addition to writing novels Poulaille was active in encouraging working class writing in France from the 1930s. He is the author of numerous novels, essays on the cinema, literature, and popular traditions. Amongst the novels that he wrote are autobiographical works: There were four (1925); Daily Bread (1931); The Wretched of the Earth (1935); Soldier of Pain (1937); The Survivors: Soldier of Pain 2 (1938); Alone in life to 14 years (published posthumously in 1980). In these novels, based on his own life, Poulaiile depicts a working-class family, the Magneux.

=== Great Britain ===
==== 19th century ====
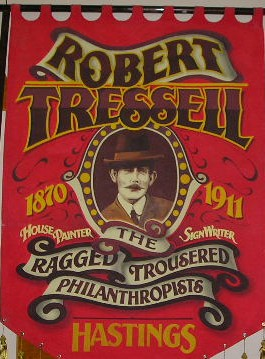
Robert Tressell banner

Poet John Clare (1793–1864) was an important early British working-class writer. Clare was the son of a farm labourer, and came to be known for his celebratory representations of the English countryside and his lamentation of its disruption. His poetry underwent a major re-evaluation in the late 20th century and he is now considered to be among the most important 19th-century poets. His biographer Jonathan Bate states that Clare was "the greatest labouring-class poet that England has ever produced. No one has ever written more powerfully of nature, of a rural childhood, and of the alienated and unstable self".

A mid-Victorian example of a working-class novel is chartist Thomas Martin Wheeler's Sunshine and Shadows, which was serialized in the Northern Star 1849–50. Another chartist writer was the shoemaker poet Thomas Cooper, who, while in prison for making an inflammatory speech, "followed in the footsteps of Bunyan and other radicals and wrote imaginatively about the themes of oppression and emancipation".

==== 20th century ====
Walter Greenwood's Love on the Dole (1933) has been described as an "excellent example" of an English proletarian novel. It was written during the early 1930s as a response to the crisis of unemployment, which was being felt locally, nationally, and internationally. It is set in Hanky Park, the industrial slum in Salford where Greenwood was born and brought up. The story begins around the time of the General Strike of 1926, but its main action takes place in 1931.

Several working-class writers wrote about their experience of life in the merchant navy, including James Hanley, Jim Phelan, George Garrett, and John Sommerfield. Liverpool-Irish writer James Hanley wrote a number of works based on his experiences at sea as well as a member of a working-class seafaring family. An early example is the novella The Last Voyage (1931), in which stoker John Reilly, who is still working only because he lied about his age, now faces his last voyage. Although Reilly is in his mid-sixties he has a young family, who will have to live in future on his inadequate pension. In another sense this is Reilly's last voyage, because despairing of the future he throws himself into the ship's furnace: “Saw all his life illuminated in those flames. ‘Not much for us. Sweat, sweat. Pay off. Sign on. Sweat, sweat. Pay off. Finish. Ah, well!’” Among other works by Hanley are Boy (1931) and The Furys (1935).

There were a number of Welsh writers who wrote works based on their experiences as coal miners, including novelist (and playwright) Jack Jones (1884–1970), B.L. Coombes (1893–1974), novelists Gwyn Thomas (1913–1981). Lewis Jones (1897–1939), and Gwyn Jones (1907–1999), and poet Idris Davies (1905–53). Jack Jones was a miner's son from Merthyr Tydfil who was himself a miner from the age of 12. He was active in the union movement and politics, starting with the Communist Party, but in the course of his life he was involved, to some degree, with all the major British parties. Amongst his novels of working-class life are Rhondda Roundabout (1935) and Bidden to the Feast (1938). Bert Coombes came from Herefordshire to Resolven in south Wales as a teenager, where he spent the rest of his life, working as a miner for 40 years. Among his works, the autobiographical These Poor Hands (Gollancz 1939) is the classic account of life as a miner in south Wales. The political development of a young miner is the subject of Cwmardy (1937), Lewis Jones's (1897–1939) largely autobiographical novel. Gwyn Thomas (1913–81) was also a coalminer's son from the Rhondda, but won a scholarship to Oxford and then became a schoolmaster. He wrote 11 novels as well as short stories, plays, and radio and television scripts, most of which focused on unemployment in the Rhondda Valley in the 1930s. Thomas's first accepted book was a collection of short stories, Where Did I Put My Pity: Folk-Tales From the Modern Welsh, which appeared in 1946. Another writer who escaped from his proletarian background was Gwyn Jones (1907–1999). He wrote about this world in novels and short stories, including Times Like These (1936) which explores the life of a working-class family during the 1926 miners' strike. The mining valleys produced a significant working-class poet in Idris Davies (1905–53), who worked as a coal miner before qualifying as a teacher. Davies was a Welsh speaker but wrote primarily in English. His works include a few poems in Welsh. Gwalia Deserta (1938) is about the Great Depression, while the subject of The Angry Summer (1943) is the 1926 miners' strike. Ron Berry (1920–1997), son of Rhondda collier who worked underground himself, produced novels and short stories rooted in the Welsh working class. Rhys Davies, author of A Time To Laugh (1937), and Menna Gallie, author of Strike for a Kingdom (1959) and The Small Mine (1962), while not working class, also wrote about life in the mining valleys of South Wales. Novelist and poet Christopher Meredith (1954- ), the son of a steelworker and former coalminer and formerly a steelworker himself, writes out of Welsh working class experience, especially in his novel Shifts (1988), set in the 1970s against the decline of the steel industry, and in most of the short stories of Brief Lives (2018).

Harold Heslop, author of the novel The Earth Beneath (1946) was another coal miner, but from the north-east of England, as was Sid Chaplin, who wrote The Thin Seam (1949).

Both Alan Sillitoe, Saturday Night and Sunday Morning (1958) and Stan Barstow, A Kind of Loving (1960), were working class writers associated with the so-called Angry young men; they were also linked with Kitchen sink realism, a literary movement that used a style of social realism. This often depicted the domestic situations of working class Britons living in cramped rented accommodation and spending their off-hours drinking in grimy pubs, to explore social issues and political controversies. However, some of the writers also associated with these two movements, like John Osborne and John Braine, did not come from the working-class.

The following are some other important twentieth-century British working class novelists and novels: Robert Tressell, The Ragged-Trousered Philanthropists (1914); James C. Welsh, The Underworld (1920); Ethel Carnie Holdsworth, This Slavery (1925); Ellen Wilkinson, Clash (1929); Lionel Britton, Hunger and Love (1931); Lewis Grassic Gibbon A Scots Quair (trilogy, 1932-4); Barry Hines, A Kestrel for a Knave (1968); William McIlvanney, Docherty (1975); Pat Barker, Union Street (1982); James Kelman, The Busconductor Hines (1984); Irvine Welsh, Trainspotting (1993).

Edward Bond is an important working-class dramatist and his play Saved (1965) became one of the best known cause célèbres in 20th century British theatre history. Saved delves into the lives of a selection of South London working class youths suppressed – as Bond would see it – by a brutal economic system and unable to give their lives meaning, who drift eventually into barbarous mutual violence.

=== Ireland ===
Notable Irish proletarian writers of the early 20th century included Liam O’Flaherty and Seán O'Casey. Leslie Daiken, Charles Donnelly and Peadar O'Donnell are also well-known.

Modern working-class authors include Karl Parkinson, Kevin Barry and Roddy Doyle.

=== Japan ===
The proletarian literature movement in Japan emerged from a trend in the latter half of the 1910s of literature about working conditions by authors who had experienced them, later called Taisho workers literature. Representative works from this period include Sukeo Miyajima's Miners (坑夫) and Karoku Miyachi's Tomizō the Vagrant (放浪者富蔵), as well as works dealing with military experiences which were also associated with the Taishō democracy, the emergence of which allowed for the development of proletarian literature in Japan. In 1921, Ōmi Komaki and Hirofumi Kaneko founded the literary magazine The Sowers (種蒔く人), which aimed to reform both the current literary scene and society. The Sowers attracted attention for recording tragedies that occurred in the wake of the 1923 Great Kantō earthquake.

In 1924, Literary Front (文芸戦線) magazine was launched by Hatsunosuke Hirabayashi and Suekichi Aono, becoming the main magazine of the Japanese proletarian literature movement. New writing such as Yoshiki Hayama's The Prostitute (淫売婦) and Denji Kuroshima's A Herd of Pigs (豚群) also began to appear in the magazine.

In 1928, the Japanese Proletarian Arts Federation (全日本無産者芸術連盟, Nippona Artista Proleta Federacio, known as NAPF) was founded, bringing together the Japan Proletarian Artists Union (日本プロレタリア芸術連盟), the Labor-Farmers Artists Union (労農芸術家連盟), and the Vanguard Artists Union (前衛芸術家同盟). NAPF was largely the responsibility of two up-and-coming writers called Takiji Kobayashi and Sunao Tokunaga, and the organization's newsletter Battleflag (戦旗, Senki) published many influential works such as Kobayashi's The Crab Cannery Ship (蟹工船) and March 15, 1928 (一九二八年三月十五日) and Tokunaga's A Street Without Sun (太陽のない街). Another important magazine was Reconstruction (改造) which published writings from Ryunosuke Akutagawa and Yuriko Miyamoto, who had just returned from the Soviet Union. Other more renowned publishers like Chūo Kōron (Central Review), Kaizō (Reconstruction), and Miyako Shinbun also published works by proletarian authors, even those who were members of the Communist party.

Author Korehito Kurehara traveled secretly to the Soviet Union in 1930 for the Profintern conference, and upon his return in 1931, he started agitating for the democratization of literary organizations. This sparked the drive to organize literary circles in factories and rural areas, creating a new source of readers and writers there.

In 1931, the NAPF became the Union of Japanese Proletarian Cultural Organizations (日本プロレタリア文化連盟, Federacio de Proletaj Kultur Organizoj Japanaj, also known as KOPF), incorporating other cultural organizations, such as musicians and filmmakers. KOPF produced various magazines including Working Woman (働く婦人)

The Japanese government cracked down harshly on proletarian authors, as the Japanese Communist Party had been outlawed since its founding in 1922. Though not all authors were associated with the party, the KOPF was, leading to mass arrests such as the March 15 incident. Some authors, such as Takiji Kobayashi were tortured to death by police, while others were forced to renounce their socialist beliefs.

Kanikōsen (1929) is a short novel by Takiji Kobayashi (translated into English as The Cannery Boat (1933), The Factory Ship (1973) and The Crab Cannery Ship (2013)), which depicts the lives of Japanese crab fishermen. Told from a left-wing point of view, it is concerned with the hardships that the crew face and how they are exploited by the owners. The book has been adapted into film and manga.

=== Korea ===
The proletarian literature movement in Korea was initially driven by the annexation of Korea by Japan in 1910 and the state of conditions that followed within the country. Proletarian literature acted as a movement that attempted to unify Korea against the shift into imperialism and capitalism that was brought forth by colonial Japan and its government that occupied Korea from the point of annexation until the end of World War II in 1945. The Korean proletarian literature movement became most prominent in the late 1920s and early 1930s, with the formation of multiple social and cultural groups that created, discussed, and revolved around proletarian arts.

Works of Korean proletarian literature written before 1927 revolved around reconstructing and reforming social issues. One such example would be the short story "Starvation and Slaughter" ("Kia wa Saryuk", 1925) by author Ch'oe Sŏ-hae, which detailed problems like discrimination between the wealthy and the poor classes. After 1927, Korean proletarian literature started to revolve around ideas that involved intellectuals rather than focus on the struggles between the rich and poor. Examples of these works include The Peasant Cho˘ng To-ryong by Yi Ki-yŏng, A Transitional Period by Han Sŏr-ya, Rat Fire by Sŏhwa, and Hometown by Kohyang.

Cultural movements, especially those of left-wing politics, were fundamental in driving the proletarian genre and movement in Korea. Yŏmgunsa, meaning Torch of the Masses, was a group and movement formed in 1922 that was led by the writer Song Yŏng, and built on a focus towards literature pertaining to social issues and class politics. PASKYULA was a group that reacted to and discussed commonplace literature and art, with more of a focus on the cultural aspects of the materials. These groups were two largely important circles in the movement of unification that represented the mix of proletarian and bourgeois ideals that initially propelled the genre of proletarian literature in Japan-occupied Korea.

Leader of Yŏmgunsa, and a key author in KAPF's circle, Song Yŏng primarily wrote with the intention of forming a solidarity within Korea as well as with Japan through his writing. Two works, "Our Love" in 1929, and "Shift Change" in 1930 highlight Yŏng's ideology of unification within his writing, as well as the idea of moving away from cultural nostalgia and an idyllic past. In "Our Love", the process of industrialization and its resulting urban cities are portrayed as locales of potential opportunity rather than iniquitous environments, depicting a contrasting opinion to other works produced within KAPF. This is first shown through Yong-hee, a primary character within the story who eventually leaves the Korean countryside and travels to Tokyo, in pursuit of escaping her hometown's oppressive patriarchal culture and finding unity, independence, and equality in urban Japan's workforce. Set in Japan, "Shift Change" focuses more on the working class movement itself through a group of feuding Korean and Japanese workers. The resolution results in a reconciliation through combined effort, encouraging a combined effort from both the Japanese and Korean proletariat.

During the Proletarian Movement, there was an urge from Japanese colonialists to “convert” Koreans away from communism. This conversion system was called cho˘nhyang. Cho˘nhyang sparked numerous works from various authors such as The Mire by Han So˘r-ya, New Year’s Day by Yi Kiyo˘ng, A Prospect by Paek Ch’o˘l, Barley by Kim Nam-ch’o˘n, and Management by Kim Nam-ch’o˘n, all published between the years 1939 and 1940.

=== Romania ===
Panait Istrati (1884–1935), was a Romanian working class writer, the son of the laundress and of a Greek smuggler. He studied in primary school for six years in Baldovinești, after being held back twice. He then earned his living as an apprentice to a tavern-keeper, then as a pastry cook and peddler. In the meantime, he was a prolific reader.

Istrati's first attempts at writing date from around 1907 when he started sending pieces to the socialist periodicals in Romania, debuting with the article, Hotel Regina in România Muncitoare. Here, he later published his first short stories, Mântuitorul ("The Redeemer"), Calul lui Bălan ("Bălan's Horse"), Familia noastră ("Our Family"), 1 Mai ("May Day"). He also contributed pieces to other leftist newspapers such as Dimineața, Adevărul, and Viața Socială. In 1910, he was involved in organizing a strike in Brăila. He went to Bucharest, Istanbul, Cairo, Naples, Paris (1913–1914), and Switzerland, where he settled for a while, trying to cure his tuberculosis). Istrati's travels were marked by two successive unhappy marriages, a brief return to Romania in 1915 when he tried to earn his living as a pig farmer, and long periods of vagabondage. In 1923 Istrati's story Kyra Kyralina (or Chira Chiralina) was published with a preface by the famous French novelist Romaine Rolland. It became the first in his Adrien Zograffi literary cycle. Rolland was fascinated with Istrati's adventurous life, urging him to write more and publishing parts of his work in Clarté, the journal that Rolland and Henri Barbusse ran. The next major work by Istrati was the novel Codine.

=== Russia and the Soviet Union ===
An important movement In the first years of the Russian Revolution, Proletkult, was an effort to encourage literacy. This was something quite different from the later, traditional and realist proletarian novel of the Stalin years.

In Literature and Revolution, Trotsky examined aesthetic issues in relation to class and the Russian revolution. Soviet scholar Robert Bird considered his work as the "first systematic treatment of art by a Communist leader" and a catalyst for later, Marxist cultural and critical theories. Trotsky presented a critique of contemporary literary movements such as Futurism and emphasised a need of cultural autonomy for the development of a socialist culture. According to literary critic Terry Eagleton, Trotsky recognised “like Lenin on the need for a socialist culture to absorb the finest products of bourgeois art”. Trotsky himself viewed the proletarian culture as “temporary and transitional” which would provide the foundations for a culture above classes. He also argued that the pre-conditions for artistic creativity were economic well-being and emancipation from material constraints. Political scientist Baruch Knei-Paz characterised his view on the role of the party as transmitters of culture to the masses and raising the standards of education, as well as entry into the cultural sphere, but that the process of artistic creation in terms of language and presentation should be the domain of the practitioner. Knei-Paz also noted key distinctions between Trotsky’s approach on cultural matters and Stalin's policy in the 1930s.

In the 1930s Socialist realism became the predominant trend in Russia under the leadership of Stalin. Maxim Gorky was declared the founder of socrealism, and his pre-revolutionary works about the Revolutionary proletariat (the novel Mother and the play Enemies) were declared the first Socrealist works. Gorky described the lives of people in the lowest strata and on the margins of society, revealing their hardships, humiliations, and brutalization. However, he did not come from a working-class family and neither did another prominent writer in the early years after the Russian Revolution of 1917, Alexander Ostrovsky.

However, Nikolai Ostrovsky is an important writer, of the early Soviet era, from a working-class family. His novel How the Steel Was Tempered (1932) has been among the most successful works of Russian literature, with tens of millions of copies printed in many languages around the world. The book is a fictionalized autobiography of Ostrovsky's life, who had a difficult working-class childhood and became a Komsomol member in July 1919 and went to the front as a volunteer. The novel's protagonist, Pavel Korchagin, represented the "young hero" of Russian literature: he is dedicated to his political causes, which help him to overcome his tragedies.

Leonid Leonov (1899 — 1994) was a Soviet novelist and playwright. His novel The Russian Forest (1953) was acclaimed by the authorities as a model Soviet book on World War II and received the Lenin Prize, but its implication that the Soviet regime had cut down "the symbol of Old Russian culture" caused some nervousness, and Nikita Khrushchev reminded the author that "not all trees are useful ... from time to time the forest must be thinned."

=== Italy ===
Working-class literature in Italy refers to literary production centered on the world of subordinate labor, written by authors who either share this social background or are directly employed in manual and factory work.

Unlike other European traditions, where working-class social realism began to develop as early as the late 19th century, this movement followed a different and more delayed historical path in Italy. This was primarily due to high illiteracy rates among the working class during the first half of the century, as well as the cultural restrictions imposed by the Fascist regime.

==== Post-World War II Era and "Industrial Literature" ====
In post-World War II Italy, neorealism attempted to bring the themes and demands of the namesake cinematic movement into the literary realm. However, much like the late 19th century Verismo movement, most authors involved in neorealist literature came from middle-class backgrounds and ultimately depicted the working class from an outsider's perspective.

With the economic boom and rapid industrialization, the factory became central to cultural debate. In 1961, the magazine Il menabò, edited by Elio Vittorini and Italo Calvino, dedicated its fourth issue to “Literature and Industry.” Despite its goal of mapping this new productive reality, the index featured only one actual worker-writer, Luigi Davì. The remaining contributions came from middle-class, mostly progressive intellectuals whose sociological interest focused heavily on machinery and the mechanics of industrial alienation, rather than the working-class experience itself.

This approach came to define Italian “industrial literature.” Its leading figures – including Ottiero Ottieri, Luciano Bianciardi, Paolo Volponi, and to some extent Nanni Balestrini – did not come from the working class, yet they deserve credit for establishing a permanent place for the world of labor within the national literary canon.

==== The 1960s and 1970s: Self-Representation ====
The wave of trade union struggles during the “Hot Autumn,” combined with the progressive democratization of access to education, paved the way for an autonomous working-class literature between the late 1960s and the 1970s. This period saw the rise of the first "factory poets" and authors of landmark novels. In addition to the poet Nella Nobili, a pioneer of Italian working-class poetry, notable examples include the poet Luigi Di Ruscio, a metalworker who emigrated to Norway; Tommaso Di Ciaula, also a metalworker, author of the novel Tuta blu (1978); and the Sardinian shepherd Gavino Ledda, author of the autobiographical novel Padre padrone (1975). Access to major publishing houses was championed by figures from the industrial literature scene. Nanni Balestrini, for instance, promoted Di Ciaula and Ledda by publishing them in Feltrinelli’s I franchi tiratori collection.

Alongside traditional distribution channels, an underground, militant literary scene flourished. A prime example is Ferruccio Brugnaro, a worker at the Porto Marghera petrochemical plant, who originally distributed his poems as flyers in factory canteens before being published by the anarchist publisher Bertani. In the early 1980s, the dedicated efforts of worker-writers like Giovanni Garancini and Sandro Sardella led to the creation of Abiti lavoro, the first Italian magazine entirely dedicated to working-class poetry.

==== The "Riflusso" and the Narrative of Precarious Work ====
With the decline of political movements and the so-called riflusso nel privato (the retreat into private life) during the 1980s, the literary representation of the subaltern classes entered a sharp decline.

In the early 2000s, the theme of work re-emerged through the "narrative of precariousness". While this period produced significant works addressing labor flexibility and call centers, critics point out that these texts generally lack a sense of class conflict or collective consciousness. A notable exception is Simona Baldanzi’s 2006 novel Figlia di una vestaglia blu, which focuses heavily on manufacturing labor and working-class memory.

==== The "Amianto" Case and the Contemporary Debate ====
In 2012, author Alberto Prunetti published Amianto. Una storia operaia through the independent Milanese publisher Agenzia X. The novel centers on the author's father, a welder who died from an occupational cancer caused by exposure to asbestos. Despite initially being rejected by several major publishing houses, the book became a major literary success. Later reprinted by Edizioni Alegre (2014) and Feltrinelli (2023), it has been adapted for the stage and ranked by critics among the most influential Italian narrative works of the first two decades of the 21st century.

The success of the book allowed Prunetti—who had previously spent a decade working in catering and cleaning services—to transition to full-time editorial work. He went on to complete a "working-class trilogy" with the subsequent novels 108 metri. The New Working Class Hero (2018), translated into English under the title Down and Out in England and Italy (2021) and Nel girone dei bestemmiatori (2022). As these works were being translated into various languages, Prunetti also authored a critical essay titled Non è un pranzo di gala. Indagine sulla letteratura working class (2022), offering a comprehensive overview of the working-class literature in Europe and Italy.

==== The Working Class Collection and the Festival of Working-Class Literature ====
In 2018, Prunetti launched the Working Class book series for Edizioni Alegre. The series aims to map contemporary working-class writing by publishing Italian authors, collective journals (such as the one kept by the Factory Collective of the former GKN plant in Campi Bisenzio), and Italian translations of international working-class writers, including D. Hunter, Anthony Cartwright, Cash Carraway, the Spanish author Luisa Carnés and Simon Paré-Poupart, a garbageman from Quebec, Canada, who wrote an internationally successful memoir.

In 2023, an initiative by Prunetti, Edizioni Alegre, ARCI cultural clubs, and the Mutual Aid Society Insorgiamo led to the creation of Italy's first Working-Class Literature Festival. The event is held annually at the former GKN factory in Campi Bisenzio, where workers have been engaged in industrial action since 2021. Combining literary debates and theatrical readings with political marches for the ecological reindustrialization of the site, the festival has seen steady growth, drawing 3,500 attendees to its first edition and over 7,000 across the 2025 and 2026 editions.

The festival, under the artistic direction of Alberto Prunetti, regularly features prominent figures from contemporary Italian working-class literature (such as Claudia Durastanti, author of the memoir Strangers I Know, and Ferruccio Brugnaro) alongside international authors from Europe, Asia, and Latin America, establishing itself as a key space for international reflection on the forms and ideas of working-class literature.

Notably, the event also received a solidarity greeting from the acclaimed British filmmaker Ken Loach. Furthermore, the Italian Working-Class Literature Festival actively aims to inspire the creation of similar initiatives internationally. This objective has already begun to materialize, as evidenced by the launch of the Washington Working-Class Literature Festival, which held its inaugural edition on May 1, 2026, explicitly stating its inspiration from the Italian festival.

=== Scandinavia ===
Scandinavia has a rich tradition of working-class literature. Often, proletarian writers have a stronger standing in national literature here than in other parts. Important writers are is represented by writers such as the Dane Martin Andersen Nexø, Norwegian Johan Falkberget, the Swedes Ivar Lo-Johansson and Moa Martinson as well as Väinö Linna from Finland.

==== Sweden ====
In Sweden, working-class literature constitutes a tradition that began in the nineteenth century and continues to the present day. It occupies a stronger position in Sweden than in other countries.

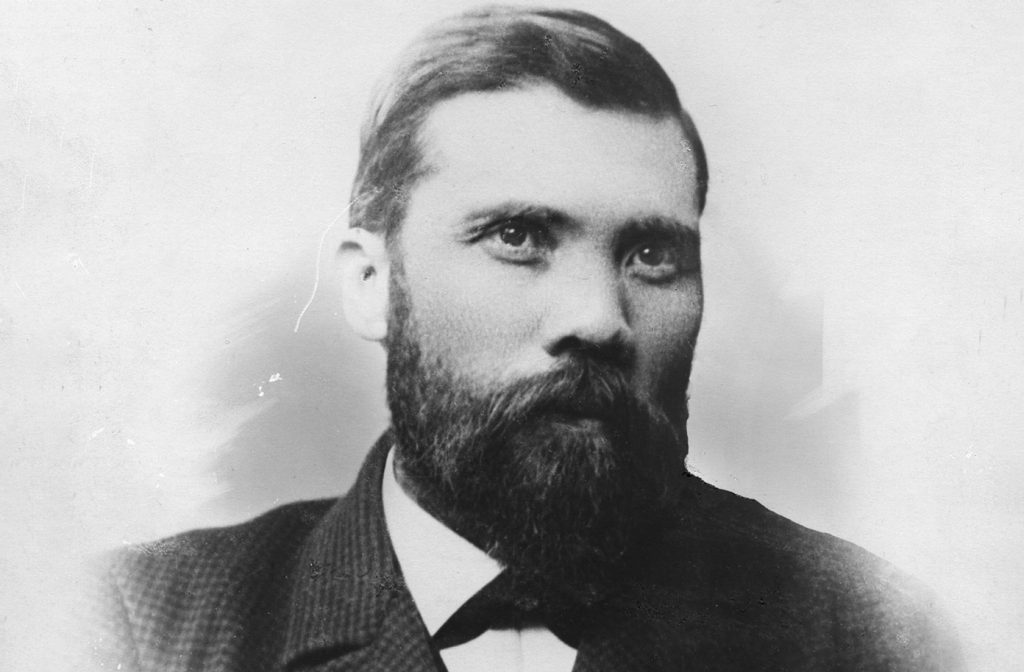
K. J. Gabrielsson (Karolus)

Early working-class literature can be found primarily within the labor movement. At first, the leaders of this movement highlighted writers such as August Strindberg and Viktor Rydberg as representatives of the working class in literature. Over time, however, the focus shifted to authors who themselves were or had been manual laborers and who were active within the labor movement. For example, in the early twentieth century the leader of the social-democratic party, Hjalmar Branting, promoted K. J. Gabrielsson – known under the pseudonym Karolus – as the first true proletarian poet.

These proletarian poets mainly wrote political poems and songs that promoted the socialist ideals of the labor movement. A good example is Gabrielsson’s poem “Skulle jag glömma, jag?” (“Should I Forget?”). Another is the song “Arbetets söner” (“Sons of Labor”), with lyrics by Henrik Menander.

In the early twentieth century, several working-class authors achieved success in the book market, often with realistic prose depictions of working-class living conditions. Among them were Dan Andersson, Gustav Hedenvind-Eriksson, Martin Koch, and Maria Sandel.

In 1921, literary scholar Richard Steffen published a reader for primary schools in which he highlighted proletarian literature as one of the most important trends in contemporary literature. This led to an intense debate. Some of the designated proletarian poets – such as Ragnar Jändel, Ivan Oljelund, and Harry Blomberg – did not at all identify with the label, while others – including Hedenvind-Eriksson and Koch – accepted it. From this point on, the term proletarian literature became firmly established in Swedish literary discourse.

During the interwar period, authors from the working class took an increasingly prominent place in Swedish literature. Around 1930, working-class literature achieved its decisive breakthrough. A significant event was the publication in 1929 of the anthology 5 Unga (5 Youths), which contained avant-garde, modernist poetry by five young authors, all of whom were autodidacts: Harry Martinson, Gustav Sandgren, Erik Asklund, Josef Kjellgren, and Artur Lundkvist. Another important event during this breakthrough phase was the publication in 1933 of three novels by authors with backgrounds in the class of agricultural laborers (statare): Ivar Lo-Johansson’s Godnatt Jord (published in English as Breaking Free), Moa Martinson’s Kvinnor och äppelträd (published in English as Women and Apple Trees), and Jan Fridegård’s En natt i juli (A Night in July).

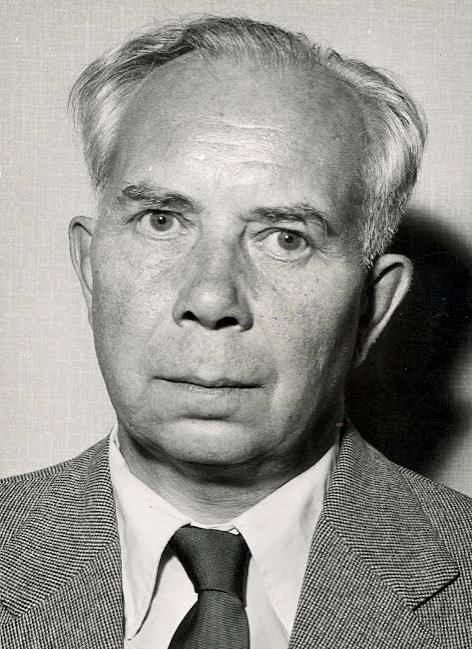
Ivar Lo-Johansson

During the 1930s, a number of working-class authors published more or less autobiographical novels about growing up in the working class at the beginning of the century. In addition to Lo-Johansson’s Breaking Free, the most important examples are Moa Martinson’s trilogy about Mia (1936–1939), Eyvind Johnson’s Romanen om Olof (The Novel about Olof, four parts, 1934–1937, the first one published in English as 1914), and Harry Martinson’s Nässlorna blomma (1935, published in English as Flowering Nettle) and Vägen ut (The Road Out, 1936). Since then, the working-class coming-of-age narrative has remained a central genre within Swedish working-class literature.

Through a book series launched by the journal Folket i Bild (Thew People Illustrated) 1941, the works of working-class authors could be distributed in inexpensive editions through book agents at workplaces. Among the authors who reached the widest readership in this way were Moa Martinson and Jan Fridegård.

After the Second World War, working-class literature was renewed by authors who wrote about the transformations of class society in connection with the development of modern industry and the welfare state. Stig Sjödin’s poetry collection Sotfragment (Fragments of Soot, 1949) deals with people in and around an ironworks. Folke Fridell, a former textile worker, depicted workers in the automated industrial society in novels such as Död mans hand (A Dead Man’s Hand, 1946) and Syndfull skapelse (Sinful Creation, 1948), and criticized the labor movement for having abandoned the struggle for a democratic working life. In the 1950s, Kurt Salomonson also made his debut; in novels such as Grottorna (The Caves, 1956), he presents a dark portrayal of the working class’s position in the Swedish welfare state.

In the 1960s and 1970s, working-class literature experienced a revival, in connection with the rise of left-wing ideas in society. Interest in earlier working-class literature increased, and a new generation of working-class authors emerged, including Aino Trosell, Torgny Karnstedt, Jan Fogelbäck, and Kjell Johansson. These authors wrote various kinds of literature, ranging from documentary works to novels, while poetry was primarily represented by Stig Sjödin.

Although working-class literature in Sweden has constituted an important and recognized strand of national literature since at least the 1930s, it has also always existed and developed in other contexts, not least within the labour movement. The trade union press has been particularly important. In newspapers such as Kommunalarbetaren (The Municipal Worker), Skogsindustriarbetaren (The Forestry Worker) and Metallarbetaren (The Metal Worker), working-class literature was given considerable space, at least until the 1980s. Stig Sjödin, for example, has been at least as active there as on the book market.

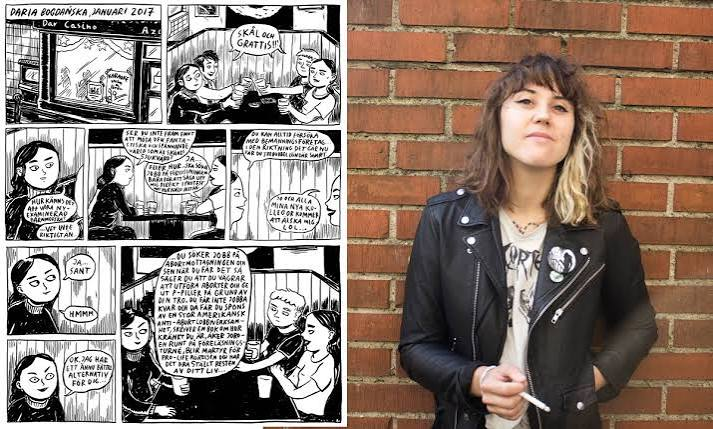

At the beginning of the 2000s, a new wave of Swedish working-class literature began, and today this literature is a broader and more diverse movement than ever before. In terms of genre, contemporary working-class literature ranges from avant-garde poetry to graphic novels. Important representatives include Susanna Alakoski, Kristian Lundberg, Johan Jönson, Jenny Wrangborg, Daria Bogdanska, Tommy Sundvall, Pelle Sunvisson, Emil Boss, David Ericsson, and Sara Beischer.

Föreningen Arbetarskrivare (The Swedish Association of Working-Class Writers) was founded in 1990 to encourage and inspire writing based on work and everyday life, and has since become an important platform for working-class literature, not least through its journal Klass (Class). Several literary prizes – such as the Ivar Lo Prize, the Ivar Lo-Johansson Personal Prize, the Moa Prize, and the Stig Sjödin Prize – are awarded annually to contemporary representatives of the working-class literary tradition.

Swedish working-class literature differs from that of other countries mainly in that it holds a stronger position within the national literary canon. At the same time, it has been strongly influenced by literature from other countries. Many of the autobiographical coming-of-age narratives of the 1930s, for example, were inspired by Maxim Gorky’s My Universities and Jack London’s Martin Eden. The Danish writer Martin Andersen Nexø has also had a considerable influence on Swedish working-class literature.

==== Finland ====
Finnish working-class literature is a literary tradition that emerged in the late 19th century alongside the rise of the Finnish labour movement and workers’ public sphere. Unlike earlier literary depictions of poverty (cf. Johan Ludvig Runeberg and Zachris Topelius), it was characterized by its close connection to organized labour, socialist ideas, and authors from working-class backgrounds.

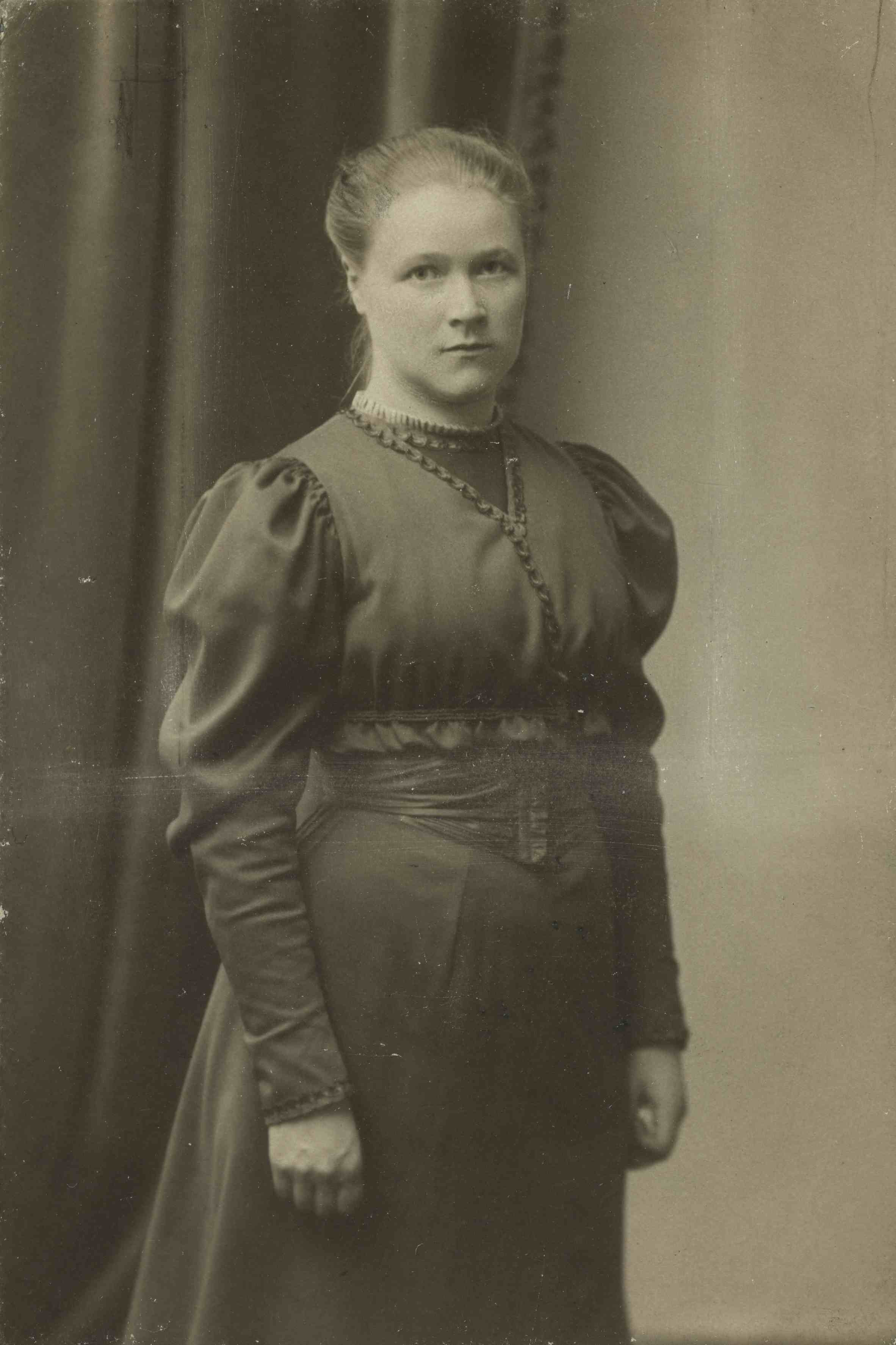
Photograph of the Finnish politician and literary author Hilja Pärssinen (1876–1935).

During the era of the old labour movement (1890–1918), working-class literature was strongly tied to labour activism and workers’ newspapers such as Työmies [Working Man]. Much of the literature consisted of poetry and political writing intended to promote class consciousness and social change. Important writers of the period included Kössi Kaatra, Konrad Lehtimäki, and Algot Untola, who published under several pen names. During the 1910s, Untola became one of the most influential literary figures associated with the labour movement, while Lehtimäki combined political activity as a Social Democratic Member of Parliament with literary production. The labour movement also attracted educated women such as Hilja Pärssinen and Elvira Willman-Eloranta. The latter, in particular, followed in the footsteps of the prominent Finnish literary activist Minna Canth.

The Finnish Civil War of 1918 marked the end of the era of the old labour movement. Following the Civil War, the literary culture of the labour movement was severely disrupted by political repression, emigration, and the deaths of many writers. Nevertheless, authors such as Kaatra, Lehtimäki, and Kaarlo Uskela continued to publish works dealing with social conflict, imprisonment, and political exclusion. The period was marked by restrictions on left-wing expression, and – for example – Uskela’s poetry collection Pillastunut runohepo [The Enraged Pegasus] (1921) became notable when it was confiscated and publicly burned by court order in 1933, making it a unique case in Finnish literary history.

During the 1930s, Finnish working-class literature underwent significant artistic renewal. Experimental writers such as Elmer Diktonius combined socialist ideas with literary modernism, while the left-wing cultural association Kiila brought together radical intellectuals and writers. At the same time, factory worker and author Toivo Pekkanen redefined the tradition through his novel Tehtaan varjossa [In the Shadow of the Factory] (1932), which portrayed working-class life in the industrial city of Kotka without emphasizing revolutionary class conflict. Pekkanen’s work helped integrate working-class literature into Finland’s national literary canon and reflected broader efforts toward social reconciliation after the Civil War.

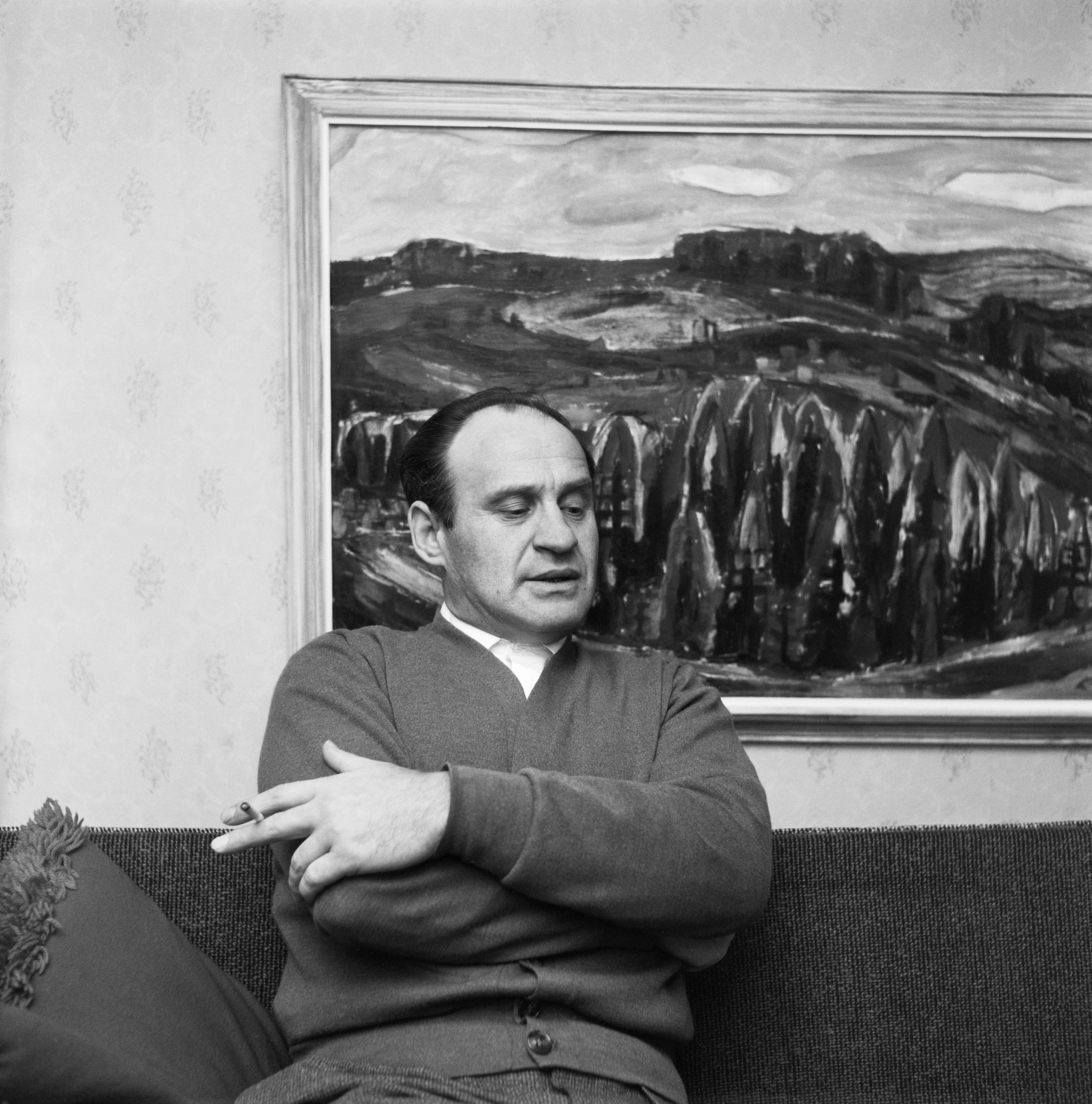
Väinö Linna at his home in 1959.

After the Second World War, working-class literature became an increasingly prominent part of Finnish literature. Former political prisoners associated with the left began writing openly about their experiences, while a new generation of authors emerged from industrial communities. The city of Tampere became particularly important through writers such as Lauri Viita and Väinö Linna. Linna’s war novel The Unknown Soldier (1954) became one of the most popular Finnish novels of the twentieth century. His trilogy Under the North Star (1959–1962) was especially significant for presenting the experiences of crofters and the defeated Red side of the Civil War as part of Finland’s national history.

The 1960s and 1970s are often regarded as the golden age of Finnish working-class literature. During this period, numerous writers from working-class and left-wing backgrounds published novels with major Finnish publishers. Hannu Salama became one of the era’s most influential authors through his socially critical and formally innovative novels, while Alpo Ruuth, Lassi Sinkkonen, and Pirkko Saisio depicted urban working-class life in Helsinki. Many of these works also reached large audiences through television adaptations, further expanding the cultural influence of working-class literature.

From the 1980s onward, the tradition became less visible as Finnish literature increasingly focused on postmodernism, individual psychology, and themes unrelated to class identity. Nonetheless, social inequality remained a factor in Finnish fiction, and scholars have argued that economic backlashes and social divisions continued to shape literary works even when they were not explicitly labelled as working-class literature.

Since the 2000s and particularly the 2010s, class has re-emerged as an important topic in Finnish public debate and literature. Contemporary authors including Arto Salminen, Ossi Nyman, Noora Vallinkoski, Sirpa Kähkönen and Marjo Niemi have explored issues such as unemployment, social mobility, welfare-state inequality, deindustrialization, and the changing nature of work. The concept of working-class literature remains actively debated by scholars and critics, while events such as Working-Class Literature Day in Tampere and the Helsinki Working-Class Literature Days continue to promote and sustain the tradition.

==== Iceland ====
Halldór Laxness's novel Independent People (1934-35), deals with the struggle of poor Icelandic farmers in the early 20th century, only freed from debt bondage in the last generation, and surviving on isolated crofts in an inhospitable landscape. It is an indictment of capitalism and materialism, the cost of the "self-reliant spirit" to relationships. This novel, along with several, helped Laxness win the Nobel Prize in Literature in 1955.

=== United States ===
The most important American working-class writers gathered in the First American Writers Congress of 1935. The League of American Writers was backed by the Communist Party USA. Among the famous international writers who attended the Congress were Georg Fink (pseudonym of the German writer Kurt Münzer), Mike Gold of New York (both of whom were Jewish), José Revueltas of Mexico, Nicomedes Guzmán of Chile, Jorge Icaza of Ecuador, and numerous others.

In the United States, Mike Gold, author of Jews Without Money, was the first to promote proletarian literature in Max Eastman's magazine The Liberator and later in The New Masses. The Communist party newspaper, The Daily Worker also published some literature, as did numerous other magazines, including The Anvil, edited by Jack Conroy, Blast, and Partisan Review.

Other examples of American proletarian writing include B. Traven, The Death Ship (1926) (though it is presumed that Traven was born in Germany); Agnes Smedley, Daughter of Earth (1929); Edward Dahlberg, Bottom Dogs (1929); Jack Conroy, The Disinherited (1933); James T. Farrell, Studs Lonigan (a trilogy, 1932-5); Robert Cantwell, The Land of Plenty (1934); Henry Roth, Call It Sleep (1934); Meridel Le Sueur, Salute to Spring (1940) and Tillie Olsen, Yonnondio (1930s, published 1974).

Writers like John Steinbeck, Theodore Dreiser, and John Dos Passos, who wrote about the working class, but who came from more well-to-do backgrounds, are not included here.

== See also ==
- Bertolt Brecht
- Doris Lessing
- Political cinema
- Political poetry
- Political drama
- Social criticism#In literature and music
