= Illinois's 3rd congressional district =

U.S. House district for Illinois

Coordinates: 41°40′44″N 87°53′31″W

- Interactive map of district boundaries since January 3, 2023
- Representative: Delia Ramirez; D–Chicago
- Area: 156.9 mi^{2} (406 km^{2})
- Population (2025): 730,780
- Median household income: $96,843
- Ethnicity: 47.3% Hispanic; 39.1% White; 6.1% Asian; 4.6% Black; 2.3% Two or more races; 0.5% other
- Cook PVI: D+17

Illinois's 3rd congressional district includes parts of Cook County and DuPage County, and has been represented by Democrat Delia Ramirez since January 3, 2023. Prior to being drastically reconfigured to a different region in 2023, when it was created largely out of portions from the 4th and 6th districts, the district was represented by Marie Newman from 2021 to 2023, Dan Lipinski from 2005 to 2021, and by Lipinski's father Bill from 1983 to 2005.

The district includes portions of the Northwest Side of the city of Chicago as well as the city's western suburbs stretching across DuPage County to its western edge, and covers 124.5 square miles (322 km^{2}). It is one of the 50 smallest districts in the U.S., and there are five smaller districts in Illinois. It is adjacent to the 1st district to the east and south, the 4th district to the north, and the 11th district to the west. It borders the 6th and 7th districts at its northwestern and northeastern corners, respectively.

The district was originally created following the 1830 census and came into being in 1833, five months before Chicago was organized as a town. It initially included northern and western Illinois before representing areas of east-central and northwestern Illinois from 1843 to 1873. The district has included part of Chicago since 1873, and part of the city's southwest side from 1895 to 2023. The district has been primarily suburban since 1973.

== Composition ==
For the 118th and successive Congresses (based on redistricting following the 2020 census), the district contains all or portions of the following counties, townships, and municipalities:

Cook County (16)

Bartlett (part, also 8th; shared with DuPage County), Chicago (part, also 1st, 2nd, 4th, 5th, 6th, 7th, 8th, and 9th; shared with DuPage County), Des Plaines (part, also 8th), Elgin (part, also 8th and 11th; shared with Kane County), Elk Grove Village (part, also 8th; shared with DuPage County), Elk Grove Township (part, also 8th), Elmwood Park, Franklin Park (part, also 6th), Hanover Park (part, also 8th), Hanover Township (part, also 8th), Leyden Township (part, also 4th and 5th), Maine Township (part, also 5th and 8th), Mount Prospect (part, also 5th and 8th), River Grove (part, also 6th), Schiller Park (part, also 5th), Streamwood (part, also 8th)

DuPage County (25)

Addison (part, also 8th), Addison Township (part, also 6th and 8th), Bartlett (part, also 8th; shared with Cook County), Batavia (part, also 11th; shared with Kane County), Bensenville, Bloomingdale Township (part, also 8th), Carol Stream (part, also 8th), Chicago (part, also 1st, 2nd, 4th, 5th, 6th, 7th, 8th, and 9th; shared with Cook County), Elk Grove Village (part, also 8th; shared with Cook County), Glen Ellyn (part, also 6th), Glendale Heights (part, also 8th), Lombard (part, also 6th), Milton Township (part, also 6th and 8th), Naperville (part, also 11th), St. Charles (part, also 11th; shared with Kane County), Villa Park (part, also 6th), Warrenville (part, also 11th), Wayne (part, also 11th; shared with Kane County), Wayne Township (part, also 8th), West Chicago, Wheaton (part, also 6th), Winfield, Winfield Township (part, also 11th), Wood Dale (part, also 8th), York Township (part, also 6th)

Chicago neighborhoods in the 3rd district include:

- Albany Park (part)
- Austin (Galewood) (part)
- Avondale
- Belmont Cragin
- Dunning (part)
- Hermosa
- Humboldt Park (part)
- Irving Park (part)
- Logan Square
- Montclare
- Portage Park (part)
- West Town (part)

=== Demographics ===
The district, situated between the Hispanic-majority 4th district to the north and the black-majority 1st and 7th districts to the east, is the home of numerous sizable and historic ethnic groups including Irish, Polish, Arab, German, Italian and Czech immigrants and their descendants. At 14.2%, the Irish make up the largest white ethnic group in the district, most prominently in the Bridgeport area (the ancestral neighborhood of the Daley family and other Chicago Irish politicians) and the Mount Greenwood-Beverly area; it is the largest Irish population in any district west of Philadelphia's suburbs. The Polish form the next largest white ethnic group at 13.5%, tying the northwest side's 5th district for the second highest percentage of any district, behind only New York's 27th congressional district. The next largest white ethnic groups are Germans (11.0%) and Italians (6.9%). Of the suburbs primarily south of 87th Street (in Palos and Worth Townships), 9 of 10 have larger Irish than Polish populations, usually by large margins; but north of 87th Street, in those areas in Lyons Township south of Interstate 55 or in the townships to the east of Harlem Avenue, 9 of 10 suburbs have greater Polish populations than Irish, again by large margins. In Oak Lawn, the district's largest suburb, Irish outnumber Polish 30%-19%; in neighboring Burbank, the district's third largest suburb, Polish outnumber Irish by an identical margin.

More recently a large Mexican community has moved to the district, notably in Berwyn, Cicero, Hodgkins and Summit where they represent over 30% of the population, and along Archer Avenue, a major Chicago artery that runs through the district's northern section. There is also a sizable Greek community in Oak Lawn and Palos Hills. In the last two decades, there has been notable Arab settlement in the vicinity of Bridgeview, and by the 2000 census, Arabs represented one of the five largest non-Hispanic ethnic groups in Bridgeview and three adjacent suburbs. Approximately 41% of the district's residents live in Chicago. Roughly 21% of the district's population are Hispanic, 68% are Caucasian, 6% are African American and 3% are Asian; redistricting following the 2000 census and the continued influx of Hispanics tripled the minority population from a decade earlier, as the district in its previous configuration had a population that was 7% Hispanic, 2% African American and 1% Asian. The more affluent areas of the district are generally located in its northwestern portion.

=== Economy ===
Prior to 2023, the district was a historic U.S. transportation and shipping hub; not only did it include Chicago Midway International Airport, but it was also traversed by the Chicago Sanitary and Ship Canal, the Calumet Sag Channel, and the Des Plaines River, earning national designations for the Chicago Portage National Historic Site in Forest View and the Illinois and Michigan Canal National Heritage Corridor. The path of historic Route 66 ran southwest through the district from its eastern end in Chicago. Interstate 55 intersected with both the Tri-State Tollway (Interstate 294) and the Dan Ryan Expressway (Interstate 90/94) in the district, and in 2001 – since which time the district has shifted slightly to the northwest – it was noted as likely having more freight yards and railroad crossings than any other district.

The district included SeatGeek Stadium, home of the Chicago Red Stars team in Women's Professional Soccer, as well as Hawthorne Race Course; the area also benefits from Chicago White Sox home games at U.S. Cellular Field, which is less than 1,000 feet (300 m) beyond the district's border. Portions of the Cook County Forest Preserves cover several square miles in the district's southwest corner. Cultural attractions include Brookfield Zoo and the Balzekas Museum of Lithuanian Culture in West Lawn; educational institutions include St. Xavier University in Mount Greenwood, Moraine Valley Community College in Palos Hills, Morton College in Cicero, and Richard J. Daley College, a Chicago city college, in West Lawn; and medical facilities include Advocate Christ Medical Center in Oak Lawn, Adventist La Grange Memorial Hospital in La Grange and MacNeal Hospital in Berwyn. A Ronald McDonald House adjacent to Advocate Christ opened in December 2008. Industrial and business presences in the district include: Tootsie Roll Industries; Electro-Motive Diesel; a Nabisco bakery which is the largest biscuit bakery in the world; the Chicago Area Consolidation Hub of United Parcel Service and adjacent BNSF Railway yard; an ACH Food manufacturing plant (formerly part of Corn Products Company) in Summit; an Owens Corning roofing and asphalt plant in Summit; and a Nalco Chemical plant in Bedford Park. The former site of the International Amphitheatre, now an Aramark plant, is within the district. Organizations based in the district include the American Nuclear Society in La Grange Park. Among the federal facilities in the district is the Great Lakes Regional Headquarters of the National Archives and Records Administration in West Lawn.

Other district sites on the National Register of Historic Places included:

- American State Bank, Berwyn
- Berwyn Health Center
- Berwyn Municipal Building
- Avery Coonley House, Riverside
- Cornell Square, New City, Chicago
- Arthur J. Dunham House, Berwyn
- First Congregational Church of Western Springs
- Grossdale Station, Brookfield
- Haymarket Martyrs' Monument National Historic Landmark, Forest Park
- Hofmann Tower, Lyons
- La Grange Village Historic District
- Lyons Township Hall, La Grange
- Old Stone Gate of Chicago Union Stockyards National Historic Landmark, New City, Chicago
- George E. Purple House, La Grange
- Ridge Historic District, Beverly/Morgan Park, Chicago
- Riverside Landscape Architecture District, Riverside
- Robert Silhan House, Berwyn
- F.F. Tomek House, Riverside
- Wayne Village Historic District
- Western Springs Water Tower

== History ==
=== 2011 redistricting ===
The district covers parts of Cook, Du Page and Will counties, as of the 2011 redistricting which followed the 2010 census. All or parts of Chicago, Bridgeview, Burbank, Crest Hill, Hickory Hills, Homer Glen, Justice, La Grange, Lemont, Lockport, Oak Lawn, Palos Heights, Palos Hills, Romeoville, Summit, Western Springs and Worth are included. The representatives for these districts were elected in the 2012 primary and general elections, and the boundaries became effective on January 3, 2013.

=== Politics ===
In its earlier configuration, the district was described as "ancestrally Democratic, culturally conservative, multiethnic and viscerally patriotic." It earned a reputation as being home to Reagan Democrats when in the 1980 presidential election it was one of only two Chicago districts (out of nine) to be won by Republican Ronald Reagan, along with the 6th district (an almost entirely suburban district which also included Chicago's O'Hare Airport); the district simultaneously reelected Democratic congressman Marty Russo with nearly 69% of the vote. The Reagan Democrat description became even more appropriate when Reagan received 65% of the vote here in 1984 while Russo again won with 64%. Redistricting for the 1990s shifted the district into more reliably Democratic territory, but Bill Clinton won the district in 1992 by just a 41%-39% margin despite receiving at least 65% of the vote in four other south side districts; he won the district with 53% in 1996 although his totals in the other south side districts were all between 80 and 85%. George W. Bush received 41% of the vote here in both 2000 and 2004 despite not exceeding 21% in any of the other four south side districts; it was his best performance in any district located primarily within Cook County. Much of the district's current suburban territory was in the 4th district from the 1950s to the 1970s, when that was a solidly Republican suburban district represented by Ed Derwinski. More recently, Lyons, Palos and Riverside Townships in the western half of the 3rd district have all voted for Bush in 2000. Over the last eight presidential elections, the Democratic nominee for Congress has run an average of 20 points ahead of the party's nominee for president in the district.

Redistricting which took effect for the 1992 elections kept only 40% of the district's previous area, and pitted nine-term incumbent Russo – who changed his residence rather than run in the 2nd district, which now included his previous home – against five-term incumbent Bill Lipinski, who had previously represented the neighboring 5th district, in the Democratic primary. Lipinski ran close to Russo in the suburbs but easily won the Chicago areas, and won the primary 58%-37%. Lipinski was decidedly the most conservative Democrat in the Illinois delegation, opposing abortion and homosexual people serving in the military while supporting school prayer, tuition vouchers, the Defense of Marriage Act and the death penalty. He also helped to write a proposed constitutional amendment in 1997 prohibiting flag desecration. A member of the Blue Dog Democrats, he was one of just 30 Democrats to vote for the Republican welfare reform plan. He clashed often with the Clinton administration, opposing the president's position over half the time in the 1997-1998 Congress. He was one of 31 Democrats to vote in favor of a Judiciary Committee inquiry during the leadup to Clinton's impeachment; he eventually voted against impeachment, but simultaneously called on Clinton to resign. In 1999, Lipinski stated that Clinton "doesn't have credibility on military issues," adding that "the American people feel Clinton is unsure." He was a consistent opponent of U.S. free trade agreements, arguing that they were disastrous for American manufacturing. Lipinski received higher approval ratings from the American Conservative Union than from the ACLU in 12 of his last 13 years in office, though his highest ratings generally came from labor and consumer groups and the Christian Coalition. He received a 0 rating from the ACLU for the 1997–98 term, and also compiled an overall 0 rating from the National Abortion Rights Action League. His policies enabled him to work easily with Republicans; he was a candidate to become Transportation Secretary in the Bush administration, and collaborated with House Speaker Dennis Hastert of the 14th district to design the state's redistricting plan following the 2000 census. and after surviving with a 54%-46% win amid the Republican gains of 1994 he was reelected by increasing margins in each succeeding election; in 2002 he became the first unopposed candidate in the history of the district.

In the 2018 Republican primary, the only option was Arthur Jones, a self-proclaimed member of the Nazi party and holocaust denier. Although Jones received over 20,000 votes in the primary, many district GOP organizations took the unprecedented step of endorsing Rep. Dan Lipinski in the general election.

=== Prominent representatives ===
Representative	Notes
John T. Stuart	Served as a major in the U.S. Army during the Black Hawk War (1832); Constitutional Union nominee for the 1860 Illinois gubernatorial election Known influencer of Abraham Lincoln
Joseph Duncan	Elected the 6th Governor of Illinois (1834 – 1838); Whig nominee for the 1842 Illinois gubernatorial election
Lorenzo Brentano	Served as President of the Free State of Baden (1849)
George R. Davis	Served as a major for the Union Army during the American Civil War (1862 – 1865)
Elihu B. Washburne	Served as Dean of the U.S. House of Representatives (1863 – 1869); Appointed the 25th U.S. Secretary of State (1869); Appointed the U.S. Minister to France (1869 – 1877)
Horatio C. Burchard	Appointed the 15th Director of the United States Mint (1879 – 1885)
Charles B. Farwell	Elected U.S. Senator from Illinois (1887 – 1891)
William E. Mason	Elected U.S. Senator from Illinois (1897 – 1903)
Robert P. Hanrahan	Served as Deputy Assistant Secretary for Education in the U.S. Department of Health, Education, and Welfare (1975 – 1977)

== Recent election results from statewide races ==
Year	Office	Results
2008	President	Obama 70% - 29%
2012	President	Obama 69% - 31%
2016	President	Clinton 69% - 25%
2016	Senate	Duckworth 65% - 28%
2016	Comptroller (Spec.)	Mendoza 61% - 32%
2018	Governor	Pritzker 67% - 28%
2018	Attorney General	Raoul 67% - 30%
2018	Secretary of State	White 78% - 19%
2018	Comptroller	Mendoza 72% - 24%
2018	Treasurer	Frerichs 69% - 27%
2020	President	Biden 70% - 28%
2020	Senate	Durbin 67% - 26%
2022	Senate	Duckworth 69% - 29%
2022	Governor	Pritzker 68% - 29%
2022	Attorney General	Raoul 67% - 30%
2022	Secretary of State	Giannoulias 68% - 30%
2022	Comptroller	Mendoza 70% - 28%
2022	Treasurer	Frerichs 67% - 31%
2024	President	Harris 64% - 33%

=== Presidential election results ===
This table indicates how the district has voted in U.S. presidential elections; election results reflect voting in the district as it was configured at the time of the election, not as it is configured today.

Election	District			Illinois winner	National winner
Election	Winner	Runner-up	Other candidates	Illinois winner	National winner
1852	Pierce (D) 8,446 (46%)	Scott (W) 7,889 (43%)	Hale (FS) 2,028 (11%)	Pierce (D)	Pierce (D)
1856	Frémont (R) 19,313 (58%)	Buchanan (D) 11,788 (36%)	Fillmore (KN) 1,921 (6%)	Buchanan (D)	Buchanan (D)
1860	Lincoln (R) 30,121 (60%)	Douglas (D) 19,241 (38%)	Breckinridge (D) 395 (1%); Bell (CU) 236 (0.5%)	Lincoln (R)	Lincoln (R)
1864	Lincoln (R) 15,724 (68%)	McClellan (D) 7,441 (32%)		Lincoln (R)	Lincoln (R)
1868	Grant (R)	Seymour (D)		Grant (R)	Grant (R)
[data missing]
1952	Eisenhower (R) 105,513 (55%)	Stevenson (D) 86,220 (45%)		Eisenhower (R)	Eisenhower (R)
1956	Eisenhower (R) 114,807 (61%)	Stevenson (D) 72,862 (39%)		Eisenhower (R)	Eisenhower (R)
1968	Humphrey (D) 111,357 (56%)	Nixon (R) 69,344 (35%)	Wallace (AIP) 16,665 (8%)	Nixon (R)	Nixon (R)
1972	Nixon (R) 155,092 (70%)	McGovern (D) 65,226 (30%)		Nixon (R)	Nixon (R)
1976	Ford (R) 121,448 (58%)	Carter (D) 88,240 (42%)		Ford (R)	Carter (D)
1980	Reagan (R) 109,179 (52%)	Carter (D) 87,091 (41%)	Anderson (I) 12,594 (6%)	Reagan (R)	Reagan (R)
1984	Reagan (R) 158,281 (65%)	Mondale (D) 84,752 (35%)		Reagan (R)	Reagan (R)
1988	G.H.W. Bush (R) 130,606 (58%)	Dukakis (D) 92,108 (41%)		G.H.W. Bush (R)	G.H.W. Bush (R)
1992	B. Clinton (D) 108,342 (41%)	G.H.W. Bush (R) 102,632 (39%)	Perot (Indep.) 52,905 (20%)	B. Clinton (D)	B. Clinton (D)
1996	B. Clinton (D) 114,089 (53%)	Dole (R) 78,853 (37%)	Perot (Reform) 19,441 (9%)	B. Clinton (D)	B. Clinton (D)
2000	Gore (D) 118,342 (55%)	G.W. Bush (R) 88,458 (41%)	Nader (G) 5,537 (3%)	Gore (D)	G.W. Bush (R)
2004	Kerry (D) 144,657 (59%)	G.W. Bush (R) 100,257 (41%)		Kerry (D)	G.W. Bush (R)
2008	Obama (D) 154,999 (64%)	McCain (R) 85,502 (35%)		Obama (D)	Obama (D)
2012	Obama (D) 143,694 (56%)	Romney (R) 109,339 (43%)		Obama (D)	Obama (D)
2016	H. Clinton (D) 157,383 (55%)	Trump (R) 113,779 (40%)		H. Clinton (D)	Trump (R)
2020	Biden (D) 175,983 (56%)	Trump (R) 135,826 (43%)		Biden (D)	Biden (D)

== List of members representing the district ==
Member	Party	Years	Cong ress	Electoral history	District location
District created March 4, 1833
Joseph Duncan (Jacksonville)	Jacksonian	March 4, 1833 – September 21, 1834	23rd	Redistricted from the at-large district and re-elected in 1832. Re-elected in 1834. Resigned to become Governor of Illinois	1833–1843; Bulk of northern and western Illinois: Adams, Calhoun, Cook, Fulton, Greene, Hancock, Henry, Jo Daviess, Knox, LaSalle, Macon, McDonough, McLean, Mercer, Morgan, Peoria, Pike, Putnam, Sangamon, Schuyler, Tazewell and Warren counties (numerous additional counties were later created within this area). During this period, Abraham Lincoln was a district resident, beginning his political career as a state legislator; the district's representative from 1839 to 1843 was Lincoln's law partner, John T. Stuart.
Vacant		September 21, 1834 – December 1, 1834	23rd		
William L. May (Springfield)	Jacksonian	December 1, 1834 – March 3, 1837	23rd 24th 25th	Elected to finish Duncan's term. Re-elected in 1836. Retired.	
William L. May (Springfield)	Democratic	March 4, 1837 – March 3, 1839	23rd 24th 25th	Elected to finish Duncan's term. Re-elected in 1836. Retired.	
John T. Stuart (Springfield)	Whig	March 4, 1839 – March 3, 1843	26th 27th	Elected in 1838. Re-elected in 1840. Retired.	
Orlando B. Ficklin (Charleston)	Democratic	March 4, 1843 – March 3, 1849	28th 29th 30th	Elected in 1842. Re-elected in 1844. Re-elected in 1846. [data missing]	1843–1853; Shifted to the east central part of the state, taking in Christian, Clark, Clay, Coles, Crawford, Cumberland, DeWitt, Edgar, Effingham, Fayette, Jasper, Lawrence, Macon, Moultrie, Piatt, Richland and Shelby counties.
Timothy R. Young (Marshall)	Democratic	March 4, 1849 – March 3, 1851	31st	Elected in 1848. [data missing]	1843–1853; Shifted to the east central part of the state, taking in Christian, Clark, Clay, Coles, Crawford, Cumberland, DeWitt, Edgar, Effingham, Fayette, Jasper, Lawrence, Macon, Moultrie, Piatt, Richland and Shelby counties.
Orlando B. Ficklin (Charleston)	Democratic	March 4, 1851 – March 3, 1853	32nd	Elected in 1850. [data missing]	1843–1853; Shifted to the east central part of the state, taking in Christian, Clark, Clay, Coles, Crawford, Cumberland, DeWitt, Edgar, Effingham, Fayette, Jasper, Lawrence, Macon, Moultrie, Piatt, Richland and Shelby counties.
Jesse O. Norton (Joliet)	Whig	March 4, 1853 – March 3, 1855	33rd 34th	Elected in 1852. Re-elected in 1854. Retired.	1853–1863; Shifted north to cover the twelve counties to the south and southwest of Cook County: Bureau, Champaign, DeWitt, Grundy, Iroquois, Kendall, LaSalle, Livingston, McLean, Putnam, Vermilion and Will counties.
Jesse O. Norton (Joliet)	Opposition	March 4, 1855 – March 3, 1857	33rd 34th	Elected in 1852. Re-elected in 1854. Retired.	1853–1863; Shifted north to cover the twelve counties to the south and southwest of Cook County: Bureau, Champaign, DeWitt, Grundy, Iroquois, Kendall, LaSalle, Livingston, McLean, Putnam, Vermilion and Will counties.
Owen Lovejoy (Princeton)	Republican	March 4, 1857 – March 3, 1863	35th 36th 37th	Elected in 1856. Re-elected in 1858. Re-elected in 1860. Redistricted to the 5th district.	1853–1863; Shifted north to cover the twelve counties to the south and southwest of Cook County: Bureau, Champaign, DeWitt, Grundy, Iroquois, Kendall, LaSalle, Livingston, McLean, Putnam, Vermilion and Will counties.
Elihu B. Washburne (Galena)	Republican	March 4, 1863 – March 6, 1869	38th 39th 40th 41st	Redistricted from the 1st district and re-elected in 1862. Re-elected in 1864. Re-elected in 1866. Re-elected in 1868. Resigned to become U.S. Secretary of State.	1863–1873; Relocated to include the six counties in the northwestern corner of the state: Carroll, Jo Daviess, Lee, Ogle, Stephenson and Whiteside counties.
Vacant		March 6, 1869 – December 6, 1869	41st		1863–1873; Relocated to include the six counties in the northwestern corner of the state: Carroll, Jo Daviess, Lee, Ogle, Stephenson and Whiteside counties.
Horatio C. Burchard (Freeport)	Republican	December 6, 1869 – March 3, 1873	41st 42nd	Elected to finish Washburne's term. Re-elected in 1870. Redistricted to the 5th district.	1863–1873; Relocated to include the six counties in the northwestern corner of the state: Carroll, Jo Daviess, Lee, Ogle, Stephenson and Whiteside counties.
Charles B. Farwell (Chicago)	Republican	March 4, 1873 – May 6, 1876	43rd 44th	Redistricted from the 1st district and re-elected in 1872. Lost election contest.	1873–1883; Relocated to include Lake County, the sixteen townships comprising the northern half of Cook County (Barrington, Cicero, Elk Grove, Evanston, Hanover, Jefferson, Lake View, Leyden, Maine, New Trier, Niles, Northfield, Palatine, Proviso, Schaumburg, Wheeling), and the north side of Chicago (the city's northern boundary east of the river was then Fullerton Avenue). During this period, the Near North Side was recovering from the devastation of the Great Chicago Fire of October 1871.
John V. Le Moyne (Chicago)	Democratic	May 6, 1876 – March 3, 1877	44th	Won election contest. Lost re-election.	1873–1883; Relocated to include Lake County, the sixteen townships comprising the northern half of Cook County (Barrington, Cicero, Elk Grove, Evanston, Hanover, Jefferson, Lake View, Leyden, Maine, New Trier, Niles, Northfield, Palatine, Proviso, Schaumburg, Wheeling), and the north side of Chicago (the city's northern boundary east of the river was then Fullerton Avenue). During this period, the Near North Side was recovering from the devastation of the Great Chicago Fire of October 1871.
Lorenzo Brentano (Chicago)	Republican	March 4, 1877 – March 3, 1879	45th	Elected in 1876. Lost renomination.	1873–1883; Relocated to include Lake County, the sixteen townships comprising the northern half of Cook County (Barrington, Cicero, Elk Grove, Evanston, Hanover, Jefferson, Lake View, Leyden, Maine, New Trier, Niles, Northfield, Palatine, Proviso, Schaumburg, Wheeling), and the north side of Chicago (the city's northern boundary east of the river was then Fullerton Avenue). During this period, the Near North Side was recovering from the devastation of the Great Chicago Fire of October 1871.
Hiram Barber Jr. (Chicago)	Republican	March 4, 1879 – March 3, 1881	46th	Elected in 1878. Lost renomination.	1873–1883; Relocated to include Lake County, the sixteen townships comprising the northern half of Cook County (Barrington, Cicero, Elk Grove, Evanston, Hanover, Jefferson, Lake View, Leyden, Maine, New Trier, Niles, Northfield, Palatine, Proviso, Schaumburg, Wheeling), and the north side of Chicago (the city's northern boundary east of the river was then Fullerton Avenue). During this period, the Near North Side was recovering from the devastation of the Great Chicago Fire of October 1871.
Charles B. Farwell (Chicago)	Republican	March 4, 1881 – March 3, 1883	47th	Elected in 1880. Retired.	1873–1883; Relocated to include Lake County, the sixteen townships comprising the northern half of Cook County (Barrington, Cicero, Elk Grove, Evanston, Hanover, Jefferson, Lake View, Leyden, Maine, New Trier, Niles, Northfield, Palatine, Proviso, Schaumburg, Wheeling), and the north side of Chicago (the city's northern boundary east of the river was then Fullerton Avenue). During this period, the Near North Side was recovering from the devastation of the Great Chicago Fire of October 1871.
George R. Davis (Chicago)	Republican	March 4, 1883 – March 3, 1885	48th	Redistricted from the 2nd district and re-elected in 1882. Retired.	1883–1893; Parts of the west side between 12th Street (now Roosevelt Road) and the North Branch of the Chicago River, excluding a small area north of 12th Street near the river; as the city was still expanding westward, the western boundary was Western Avenue from the river to North Avenue, and Crawford Avenue (now Pulaski Road) from North to 12th. Illinois gained two additional representatives following the 1890 census, but they were elected on an at-large basis for the 1893–1895 term before redistricting occurred, and the previous decade's districting remained in effect.
James H. Ward (Chicago)	Democratic	March 4, 1885 – March 3, 1887	49th	Elected in 1884. Retired.	
William E. Mason (Chicago)	Republican	March 4, 1887 – March 3, 1891	50th 51st	Elected in 1886. Re-elected in 1888. Lost re-election.	
Allan C. Durborow Jr. (Chicago)	Democratic	March 4, 1891 – March 3, 1895	52nd 53rd	Elected in 1890. Re-elected in 1892. Retired.	
Allan C. Durborow Jr. (Chicago)	Democratic	March 4, 1891 – March 3, 1895	52nd 53rd	Elected in 1890. Re-elected in 1892. Retired.	1893–1903; From the river south to 26th Street; West of the river and south of 12th Street bordered on the west by Johnson Street (now Peoria Street) from 12th to 22nd Street (now Cermak Road) and by Halsted Street from 22nd to the river; and South of the Illinois and Michigan Canal and the river as far south as 39th Street (now Pershing Road) between Western and Wentworth Avenues. In the 1896 House election, Clarence Darrow lost by 590 votes (2.5%).
Lawrence E. McGann (Chicago)	Democratic	March 4, 1895 – December 27, 1895	54th	Elected in 1894. Lost election contest.	1893–1903; From the river south to 26th Street; West of the river and south of 12th Street bordered on the west by Johnson Street (now Peoria Street) from 12th to 22nd Street (now Cermak Road) and by Halsted Street from 22nd to the river; and South of the Illinois and Michigan Canal and the river as far south as 39th Street (now Pershing Road) between Western and Wentworth Avenues. In the 1896 House election, Clarence Darrow lost by 590 votes (2.5%).
Hugh R. Belknap (Chicago)	Republican	December 27, 1895 – March 3, 1899	54th 55th	Won election contest. Elected in 1896. Lost re-election.	1893–1903; From the river south to 26th Street; West of the river and south of 12th Street bordered on the west by Johnson Street (now Peoria Street) from 12th to 22nd Street (now Cermak Road) and by Halsted Street from 22nd to the river; and South of the Illinois and Michigan Canal and the river as far south as 39th Street (now Pershing Road) between Western and Wentworth Avenues. In the 1896 House election, Clarence Darrow lost by 590 votes (2.5%).
George P. Foster (Chicago)	Democratic	March 4, 1899 – March 3, 1903	56th 57th	Elected in 1898. Re-elected in 1900. Redistricted to the 4th district.	1893–1903; From the river south to 26th Street; West of the river and south of 12th Street bordered on the west by Johnson Street (now Peoria Street) from 12th to 22nd Street (now Cermak Road) and by Halsted Street from 22nd to the river; and South of the Illinois and Michigan Canal and the river as far south as 39th Street (now Pershing Road) between Western and Wentworth Avenues. In the 1896 House election, Clarence Darrow lost by 590 votes (2.5%).
William W. Wilson (Chicago)	Republican	March 4, 1903 – March 3, 1913	58th 59th 60th 61st 62nd	Elected in 1902. Re-elected in 1904. Re-elected in 1906. Re-elected in 1908. Re-elected in 1910. Lost re-election.	1903–1933; Began to take on its modern territory, and included the nine southernmost townships of Cook County (Bloom, Bremen, Calumet, Lemont, Orland, Palos, Rich, Thornton and Worth), as well as that part of Chicago west of State Street between 51st Street and 111th Street excepting one and a quarter square miles in the southeast corner. (Note: In 1903 the city's western limit at 111th Street was Western Avenue, and at 115th Street was Ashland Avenue; but during this period, various portions of Calumet and Worth townships were annexed by Chicago.) Illinois' districts were not redrawn until 1947, taking effect for the 1948 elections.
George E. Gorman (Chicago)	Democratic	March 4, 1913 – March 3, 1915	63rd	Elected in 1912. Retired.	
William W. Wilson (Chicago)	Republican	March 4, 1915 – March 3, 1921	64th 65th 66th	Elected in 1914. Re-elected in 1916. Re-elected in 1918. Retired.	
Elliott W. Sproul (Chicago)	Republican	March 4, 1921 – March 3, 1931	67th 68th 69th 70th 71st	Elected in 1920. Re-elected in 1922. Re-elected in 1924. Re-elected in 1926. Re-elected in 1928. Lost re-election.	
Edward A. Kelly (Chicago)	Democratic	March 4, 1931 – January 3, 1943	72nd 73rd 74th 75th 76th 77th	Elected in 1930. Re-elected in 1932. Re-elected in 1934. Re-elected in 1936. Re-elected in 1938. Re-elected in 1940. Lost re-election.	
Edward A. Kelly (Chicago)	Democratic	March 4, 1931 – January 3, 1943	72nd 73rd 74th 75th 76th 77th	Elected in 1930. Re-elected in 1932. Re-elected in 1934. Re-elected in 1936. Re-elected in 1938. Re-elected in 1940. Lost re-election.	1933–1943 [data missing]
Fred E. Busbey (Chicago)	Republican	January 3, 1943 – January 3, 1945	78th	Elected in 1942. Lost re-election.	1943–1953; Included that part of Chicago bounded on the north by 65th Street (Cicero Avenue to Western Avenue), Marquette Road (Western to Damen), 59th Street (Damen to Wallace) and Garfield Boulevard (Wallace to the railroad between Wentworth and State Street), and bounded on the east by the railroad (Garfield to 59th), State Street (59th to 73rd Street), Indiana Avenue (73rd to 83rd Street), South Park Boulevard (later renamed King Drive, 83rd to 99th Street), Stewart Avenue (99th to 103rd Street) and Halsted (103rd to 123rd Street). The same boundaries were maintained in the redistricting after 1950.
Edward A. Kelly (Chicago)	Democratic	January 3, 1945 – January 3, 1947	79th	Elected in 1944. Lost re-election.	
Fred E. Busbey (Chicago)	Republican	January 3, 1947 – January 3, 1949	80th	Elected in 1946. Lost re-election.	
Neil J. Linehan (Chicago)	Democratic	January 3, 1949 – January 3, 1951	81st	Elected in 1948. Lost re-election.	
Fred E. Busbey (Chicago)	Republican	January 3, 1951 – January 3, 1955	82nd 83rd	Elected in 1950. Re-elected in 1952. Lost re-election.	
Fred E. Busbey (Chicago)	Republican	January 3, 1951 – January 3, 1955	82nd 83rd	Elected in 1950. Re-elected in 1952. Lost re-election.	1953–1963 [data missing]
James C. Murray (Chicago)	Democratic	January 3, 1955 – January 3, 1957	84th	Elected in 1954. Lost re-election.	1953–1963 [data missing]
Emmet F. Byrne (Chicago)	Republican	January 3, 1957 – January 3, 1959	85th	Elected in 1956. Lost re-election.	1953–1963 [data missing]
William T. Murphy (Chicago)	Democratic	January 3, 1959 – January 3, 1971	86th 87th 88th 89th 90th 91st	Elected in 1958. Re-elected in 1960. Re-elected in 1962. Re-elected in 1964. Re-elected in 1966. Re-elected in 1968. Retired.	1953–1963 [data missing]
William T. Murphy (Chicago)	Democratic	January 3, 1959 – January 3, 1971	86th 87th 88th 89th 90th 91st	Elected in 1958. Re-elected in 1960. Re-elected in 1962. Re-elected in 1964. Re-elected in 1966. Re-elected in 1968. Retired.	1963–1973; Included the village of Evergreen Park as well as that part of Chicago bounded on the north by 66th Street (Cicero to the railroad 1/2 mile east of Kedzie), Marquette (the railroad to Damen), 59th Street (Damen to Racine) and Garfield (Racine to the railroad 1/4 mile east of Halsted), and bounded on the east by the railroad (Garfield to 59th), Halsted (59th to 63rd Street), State Street (63rd to 83rd Street), Stewart (83rd to 99th Street), State Street (99th to 111th Street), Wentworth Avenue (111th to 113th Street) and Halsted (113th to 123rd Street). There was additional redistricting in Illinois which took effect for the 1967–1969 term, but the 3rd District was not altered.
Morgan F. Murphy (Chicago)	Democratic	January 3, 1971 – January 3, 1973	92nd	Elected in 1970. Redistricted to the 2nd district.	
Robert P. Hanrahan (Homewood)	Republican	January 3, 1973 – January 3, 1975	93rd	Elected in 1972. Lost re-election.	1973–1983; Shifted primarily into suburban areas to include Thornton and Calumet Townships, most of Worth Township (excepting the municipalities of Bridgeview, Chicago Ridge, Crestwood, Palos Heights and Worth), the Chicago communities of Ashburn and Mount Greenwood, those parts of West Lawn and Chicago Lawn south of 63rd Street, and those parts of Beverly and Morgan Park west of Western Avenue.
Marty Russo (South Holland)	Democratic	January 3, 1975 – January 3, 1993	94th 95th 96th 97th 98th 99th 100th 101st 102nd	Elected in 1974. Re-elected in 1976. Re-elected in 1978. Re-elected in 1980. Re-elected in 1982. Re-elected in 1984. Re-elected in 1986. Re-elected in 1988. Re-elected in 1990. Lost renomination.	1973–1983; Shifted primarily into suburban areas to include Thornton and Calumet Townships, most of Worth Township (excepting the municipalities of Bridgeview, Chicago Ridge, Crestwood, Palos Heights and Worth), the Chicago communities of Ashburn and Mount Greenwood, those parts of West Lawn and Chicago Lawn south of 63rd Street, and those parts of Beverly and Morgan Park west of Western Avenue.
Marty Russo (South Holland)	Democratic	January 3, 1975 – January 3, 1993	94th 95th 96th 97th 98th 99th 100th 101st 102nd	Elected in 1974. Re-elected in 1976. Re-elected in 1978. Re-elected in 1980. Re-elected in 1982. Re-elected in 1984. Re-elected in 1986. Re-elected in 1988. Re-elected in 1990. Lost renomination.	1983–1993; Parts of the district shifted to the west, taking in part of the 4th district. The district now included: Bremen Township; Worth Township excepting that part between 111th Street and 135th Street west of Cicero Avenue as well as approximately 1/4 mi^{2} of Worth north of 111th; that part of Calumet Township in Blue Island and Calumet Park northwest of the railroad running from 123rd and Laflin to the western township line; that part of Thornton Township west of the Calumet Expressway having as its northern boundary 167th Street (from the Bremen Township line to the eastern edge of Hazel Crest), 171st/172nd Street (Hazel Crest to Halsted Street), 167th (Halsted to State Street, which becomes Indiana Avenue) and the Little Calumet River (Indiana Avenue to the Calumet Expressway); the part of Stickney Township south of 65th Street; the Chicago communities of Clearing, West Lawn, Ashburn, Mount Greenwood and Beverly, the western part of Morgan Park, and the additional part of Chicago between 55th Street, 75th Street, Cicero Avenue and the railroad 1/4 mile east of Western excepting that portion from the railroad to Western between 63rd Street and 69th Street.
Bill Lipinski (Chicago)	Democratic	January 3, 1993 – January 3, 2005	103rd 104th 105th 106th 107th 108th	Redistricted from the 5th district and re-elected in 1992. Re-elected in 1994. Re-elected in 1996. Re-elected in 1998. Re-elected in 2000. Re-elected in 2002. Retired.	1993–2003; Shifted significantly to the northwest, and now included: all of Lyons Township; all of Stickney Township except the portion north of Pershing Road; all of Berwyn and Riverside; approximately the eastern half of Brookfield and the western half of Cicero; those portions of Forest Park and North Riverside east of the Des Plaines River and south of Harrison Street; most of Oak Park south of the Eisenhower Expressway; those parts of Worth Township having as their eastern boundary Pulaski Road from 87th Street to 101st Street, and Cicero Avenue from 101st Street to 135th Street, with minor variations in Oak Lawn; those parts of Palos Township having as their western boundary Roberts Road (80th Avenue) from 87th Street to 120th Street and then southwest along the railroad to 135th Street, plus approximately 1/8 m^{2} west of Roberts Road in the vicinity of Stagg High School; those parts of Bremen Township having as their eastern boundary Cicero Avenue from 135th Street to 143rd Street, the railroad and then Pulaski from 143rd Street to 159th Street, Cicero from 159th Street to 167th Street, Interstate 57 from 167th Street to 177th Street, and Central Avenue from 177th Street to 183rd Street; the Chicago communities of Garfield Ridge, Clearing, Archer Heights, West Elsdon and West Lawn, those parts of Gage Park, Chicago Lawn and Ashburn west of Kedzie Avenue, approximately those parts of Brighton Park northwest of 38th Street and St. Louis Avenue or southwest of 43rd Street and Kedzie, and nearly 1/8 m^{2} in the southwest corner of Austin.
Bill Lipinski (Chicago)	Democratic	January 3, 1993 – January 3, 2005	103rd 104th 105th 106th 107th 108th	Redistricted from the 5th district and re-elected in 1992. Re-elected in 1994. Re-elected in 1996. Re-elected in 1998. Re-elected in 2000. Re-elected in 2002. Retired.	2003–2013
Dan Lipinski (Western Springs)	Democratic	January 3, 2005 – January 3, 2021	109th 110th 111th 112th 113th 114th 115th 116th	Elected in 2004. Re-elected in 2006. Re-elected in 2008. Re-elected in 2010. Re-elected in 2012. Re-elected in 2014. Re-elected in 2016. Re-elected in 2018. Lost renomination.	2003–2013
Dan Lipinski (Western Springs)	Democratic	January 3, 2005 – January 3, 2021	109th 110th 111th 112th 113th 114th 115th 116th	Elected in 2004. Re-elected in 2006. Re-elected in 2008. Re-elected in 2010. Re-elected in 2012. Re-elected in 2014. Re-elected in 2016. Re-elected in 2018. Lost renomination.	2013–2023 For a more detailed map, see the Census Bureau map linked below.
Marie Newman (La Grange)	Democratic	January 3, 2021 – January 3, 2023	117th	Elected in 2020. Redistricted to the 6th district and lost renomination.	2013–2023 For a more detailed map, see the Census Bureau map linked below.
Delia Ramirez (Chicago)	Democratic	January 3, 2023 – present	118th 119th	Elected in 2022. Re-elected in 2024. Re-elected in 2026.	2023–present

== Recent election results ==
=== 2004 ===
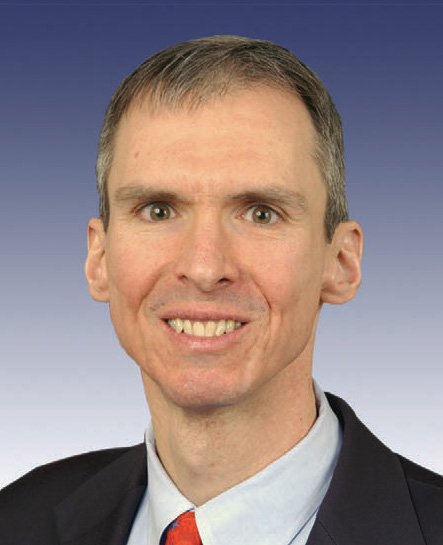
Rep. Dan Lipinski

The district's seat changed hands under somewhat controversial circumstances in 2004. Lipinski was renominated in the primary election, but in August announced his intention to withdraw from the race, just two weeks before the deadline for replacing a candidate on the ballot. Four days later, the district's ward and township committeemen – including Lipinski himself as well as Mayor Daley's brother John and Illinois House Speaker Michael Madigan – met to choose a replacement; Lipinski nominated his son Dan, an assistant professor at the University of Tennessee, and he was approved without opposition despite not having lived in Illinois since 1989. In his initial campaign, the younger Lipinski stated that his policies made him "not really that different from" his father, and indicated that he would oppose same-sex marriage as well as abortion except when the mother's life was at stake. True to the district's heritage, he identified Reagan as his political hero.

=== 2012 ===
Democratic primary 2012: Illinois 3rd congressional district
Party	Candidate	Votes	%
Democratic	Dan Lipinski (incumbent)	44,532	87.33
Democratic	Farah Baqai	6,463	12.67
Total votes		50,995	100.00

Republican primary 2012: Illinois 3rd congressional district
Party	Candidate	Votes	%
Republican	Richard Grabowski	20,895	59.35
Republican	Jim Falvey	10,449	29.68
Republican	Arthur Jones	3,861	10.97
Total votes		35,205	100.00

General election 2012: Illinois's 3rd congressional district
Party	Candidate	Votes	%
Democratic	Dan Lipinski (incumbent)	168,738	68.48
Republican	Richard Grabowski	77,653	31.52
Independent (Write-in)	Laura Anderson	7	0.002
Total votes		246,398	100.00
Democratic hold			

=== 2014 ===
Illinois's 3rd congressional district, 2014
Party	Candidate	Votes	%
Democratic	Dan Lipinski (incumbent)	116,764	64.6
Republican	Sharon Brannigan	64,091	35.4
Total votes		180,855	100.0
Democratic hold			

=== 2016 ===
Illinois's 3rd congressional district, 2016
Party	Candidate	Votes	%
Democratic	Dan Lipinski (incumbent)	225,320	99.96
Independent	Diane Harris (write-in)	91	0.04
Total votes		225,411	100
Democratic hold			

=== 2018 ===
2018 Illinois 3rd congressional district Democratic primary
Party	Candidate	Votes	%
Democratic	Dan Lipinski (incumbent)	48,675	51.13
Democratic	Marie Newman	46,530	48.87
Total votes		95,205	100.00

2018 Illinois 3rd congressional district general election
Party	Candidate	Votes	%
Democratic	Dan Lipinski (incumbent)	163,053	73.01
Republican	Arthur J. Jones	57,885	25.92
Independent	Justin Hanson (Write-in)	1,353	0.61
Independent	Kenneth Yerkes (Write-in)	1,039	0.47
Independent	Richard Meyers (Write-in)	4	0.002
Total votes		223,334	100.00
Democratic hold			

=== 2020 ===
Marie Newman won the 2020 Democratic primary against incumbent Dan Lipinski by 48.2% to 45.8%.

Illinois's 3rd congressional district, 2020
Party	Candidate	Votes	%	±%
Democratic	Marie Newman	172,997	56.38	−16.63%
Republican	Mike Fricilone	133,851	43.67	+17.75%
Total votes		306,848	100.0	
Democratic hold				

=== 2022 ===
2022 Illinois's 3rd congressional district election
Party	Candidate	Votes	%
Democratic	Delia Ramirez	121,764	68.5
Republican	Justin Burau	55,995	31.5
Total votes		177,759	100.0
Democratic win (new seat)			

=== 2024 ===
Illinois's 3rd congressional district, 2024
Party	Candidate	Votes	%	±%
Democratic	Delia Ramirez (incumbent)	174,825	67.26	−1.24%
Republican	John Booras	84,987	32.70	+1.20%
Write-in		96	0.04	N/A
Total votes		259,908	100.0	
Democratic hold				

== See also ==
- Illinois's congressional districts
- Gerrymander
- List of United States congressional districts
