= Durborow =

Durborow is a surname. Notable people with the surname include:

- Allan C. Durborow, Jr. (1857–1908), American politician
- Charles Durborow (1882–1938), American distance swimmer
