= Martin Russo =

Marty or Martin Russo may refer to:

- Marty Russo (born 1944), American politician
