= John F. Finerty =

American journalist and politician

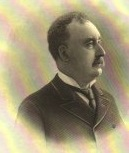

Member of the U.S. House of Representatives from Illinois's 2nd district
- In office March 4, 1883 – March 3, 1885
- Preceded by: George R. Davis
- Succeeded by: Frank Lawler

Personal details
- Born: September 10, 1846 Galway, Ireland
- Died: June 10, 1908 (aged 61) Chicago, Illinois, United States
- Party: Democratic

John Frederick Finerty (September 10, 1846 – June 10, 1908) was a prominent journalist and U.S. representative from Illinois.

== Early life ==
Finerty was born in Galway, Ireland to M. J. Finerty, editor of the Galway Vindicator, and Margaret Finerty (née Flynn). He was left in the care of an uncle upon the early passing of his father. Finerty received a strong education at national schools and from private tutors. History and literature were his favorite subjects. At the age of eleven, he moved to Tipperary, where he was influenced by Irish patriot Father John Kenyon. Finerty became an Irish nationalist and joined the National Brotherhood of St. Patrick. A year later, in the midst of the Civil War, he fled to the United States to avoid arrest in Ireland for his activities.

== Journalistic career ==
Finerty enlisted in the Union Army and served in the Ninety-ninth Regiment of the New York State Militia. He was a war correspondent for the Chicago Times in the Sioux War of 1876, in the Northern Indian (Sioux) War of 1879, in the Ute campaign of 1879, and afterward in the Apache campaign of 1881. He was a correspondent in Washington, D.C. during the sessions of the Forty-sixth Congress (1879–1881). He established the Citizen, an Irish weekly newspaper, in Chicago in 1882.

=== Assignments to Mexico ===
Finerty was long fascinated with Mexico, and Chicago Times editor Wilbur F. Storey twice sent "the Reckless Hibernian," as Finerty was known, south of the border to report. Finerty extensively documented these excursions, which he intended to publish as a book, later independently compiled and published by the University of Texas at El Paso.

==== Border tensions in 1877 ====
Of his first foray into Porfirian Mexico, Finerty documented contemporary reactions to the election of President Porfirio Díaz; described the Texan city of San Antonio, the villages of Uvalde and Eagle Pass, and the Mexican town of Santa Rosa; and reported conversations with General E.O.C. Ord and Colonel William Rufus Shafter.

==== The American Industrial Deputation to Mexico ====
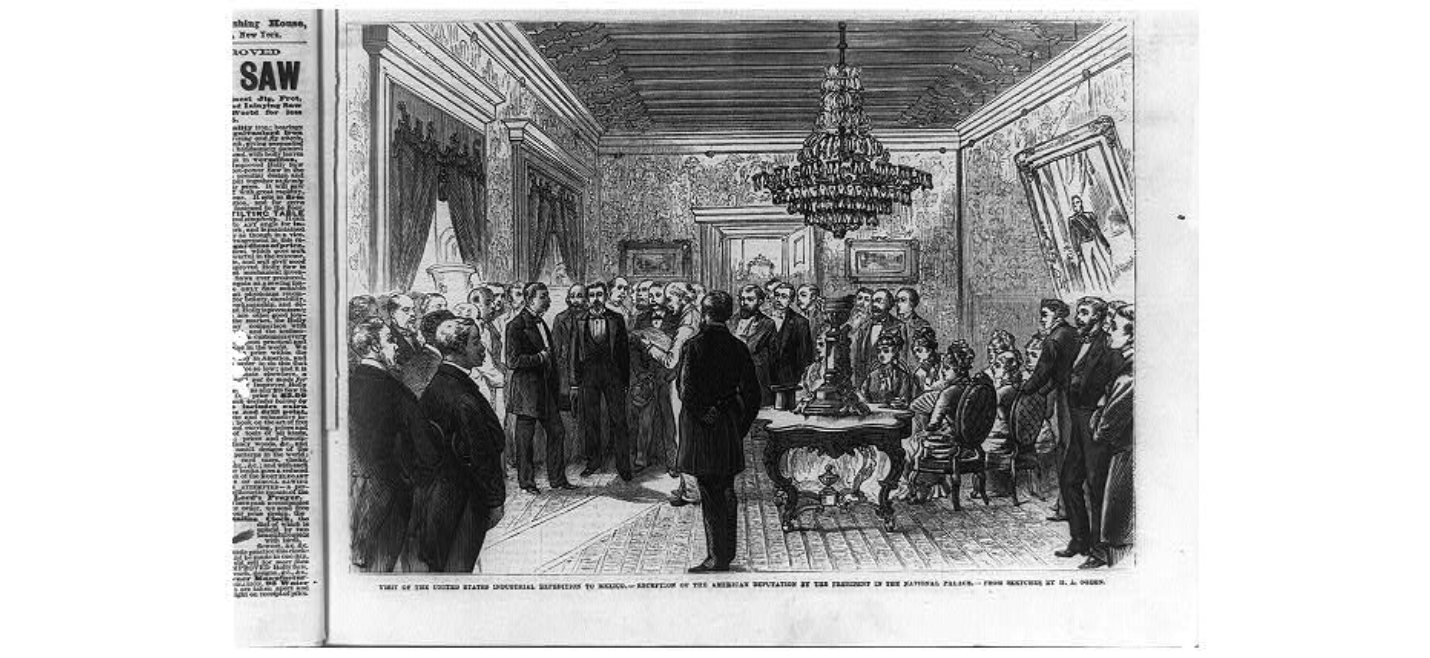
Reception of the American Deputation by President Porfirio Diaz in the National Palace, Ciudad de México, March 15, 1879.

In March 1879, attached to the American Industrial Deputation to Mexico by Storey, Finerty was the first U.S. journalist to be granted an audience with President Diaz at the National Palace. Finerty reported the eighty delegates and their spouses attending the Deputation as including, among other noteworthy individuals,

- Journalist Byron Andrews of the Chicago Inter-Ocean
- Illustrator H.A. Ogden
- Representative Peter V. Deuster of Milwaukee, German-American Democratic Congressman and newspaper editor
- Coleman Sellers II, engineer and inventor
- Milwaukee Mayor John Black
- Edward D. Holton, business leader and co-founder of the Republican Party
- Journalist Jerome J. Collins of the New York City Herald
- John F. Fisk of Kentucky
- Earl W. Oglebay of Oglebay, Norton, and Company

Finerty's account of these events includes whimsical anecdotes of unguarded moments with the delegates. At the conclusion of the Deputation's itinerary at Vera Cruz, rather than return to the U.S. with the delegation, Finerty remained in Mexico and went about further exploring and reporting from the country on his own.

== Political career ==
Finerty was elected as an Independent Democrat to the Forty-eighth Congress (March 4, 1883 – March 3, 1885). He served as member of the board of local improvements 1906-1908. He died in Chicago, and was interred in Calvary Cemetery.

== Selected published works ==
- Author of two-volume "Ireland: The People's History of Ireland" New York and London: The Co-operative Publication Society, 1904.
- Author of "War-Path and Bivoac: The Conquest of the Sioux" (1890), considered a classic account of the Great Sioux War of 1876-1877. Chicago: Donohue & Henneberry, 1890. (Subsequent editions published by Dodd, Mead & Co. of New York.)
- Finerty's account of The Battle of the Rosebud (taken in 1894).

== Other sources ==
- United States Congress. "John F. Finerty (id: F000127)". Biographical Directory of the United States Congress. Retrieved on 2008-11-05

U.S. House of Representatives
Preceded by George R. Davis	Member of the U.S. House of Representatives from Illinois's 2nd congressional district 1883-1885	Succeeded by Frank Lawler
