= James Hugh Ward =

American politician (1853–1916)

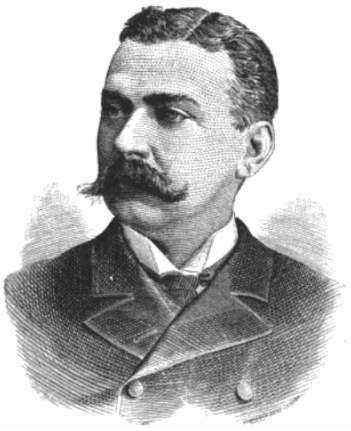
- Ward in 1885

Member of the U.S. House of Representatives from Illinois's 3rd district
- In office March 4, 1885 – March 3, 1887
- Preceded by: George R. Davis
- Succeeded by: William E. Mason

Personal details
- Born: November 30, 1853 Chicago, Illinois, U.S.
- Died: August 15, 1916 (aged 62) Chicago, Illinois, U.S.
- Resting place: Calvary Cemetery
- Party: Democratic
- Occupation: Politician, lawyer

James Hugh Ward (November 30, 1853 – August 15, 1916) was an American politician and lawyer. A Democrat, he was a member of the United States House of Representatives from Illinois. Born in Chicago, he served in the House from 1885 to 1887. Politically, he leaned liberal.

== Biography ==
Ward was born on November 30, 1853, in Chicago, the son of builder Hugh Ward. Educated at local public schools, he studied classics at the University of Notre Dame, then studied at the Pritzker School of Law, graduating in 1873 and June 1876, respectively. He spent 1874 in Europe. On July 4, 1876, he was admitted to the bar, after which he practiced law. He was a successful lawyer, primarily practicing in equity and probate courts.

Ward was a Democrat. In April 1879, he was elected supervisor of West Chicago, as which he greatly improved the city's finances. In 1884, he was a delegate to the Illinois Democratic Convention. There, he was made an elector, voting for Grover Cleveland and Thomas A. Hendricks. Some requested he run for the United States Senate, though he declined. He was a member of the United States House of Representatives, from March 4, 1885, to March 3, 1887, representing Illinois's 3rd district. He refused twice to run in the following election, citing conflicts with his business interests as to why. Politically, he leaned liberal.

After serving in Congress, Ward returned to practicing law in Chicago. He entered a partnership with Robert B. Kirkland. On October 25, 1877, he married Agatha St. Clair; they had a son together, Hugh St. Clair Ward. He died on August 15, 1916, aged 62, in Chicago, and was buried in Calvary Cemetery. The location of his papers is unknown.

U.S. House of Representatives
Preceded by George R. Davis	Member of the U.S. House of Representatives from Illinois's 3rd congressional district 1885–1887	Succeeded by William E. Mason
