= George Peter Foster =

American politician (1858-1928)

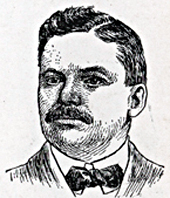

Member of the U.S. House of Representatives from Illinois
- In office March 4, 1899 – March 3, 1905
- Preceded by: Hugh R. Belknap (3rd); James McAndrews (4th)
- Succeeded by: Warfield W. Wilson (3rd); Charles S. Wharton (4th)
- Constituency: 3rd district (1899-1903); 4th district (1903-05)

Personal details
- Born: April 3, 1858 Dover, New Jersey, U.S.
- Died: November 11, 1928 (aged 70) Wheaton, Illinois, U.S.
- Party: Democratic

George Peter Foster (April 3, 1858 – November 11, 1928) was a U.S. representative from Illinois.

Born in Dover, New Jersey, Foster moved to Chicago, Illinois in 1867. He attended the public schools and the University of Chicago. He was graduated from Union College of Law at Chicago in 1882. He was admitted to the bar the same year and commenced practice in Chicago. He was in the Justice of the Peace for the town of South Chicago 1891–1899. He was acting police magistrate of the principal police court of the city 1893–1899.

Foster was elected as a Democrat to the Fifty-sixth, Fifty-seventh, and Fifty-eighth Congresses (March 4, 1899 – March 3, 1905). He was an unsuccessful candidate for reelection in 1904. He resumed the practice of law. He served as assistant corporation counsel of Chicago from 1912 to 1922. He retired from active pursuits in 1928 and moved to Wheaton, Illinois, where he died November 11, 1928. He was interred in Calvary Cemetery in Chicago.

U.S. House of Representatives
Preceded by Hugh R. Belknap	Member of the U.S. House of Representatives from Illinois's 3rd congressional district 1899-1903	Succeeded by William W. Wilson
Preceded by James McAndrews	Member of the U.S. House of Representatives from Illinois's 4th congressional district 1903-1905	Succeeded by Charles S. Wharton
