= George R. Davis (Illinois politician) =

American politician

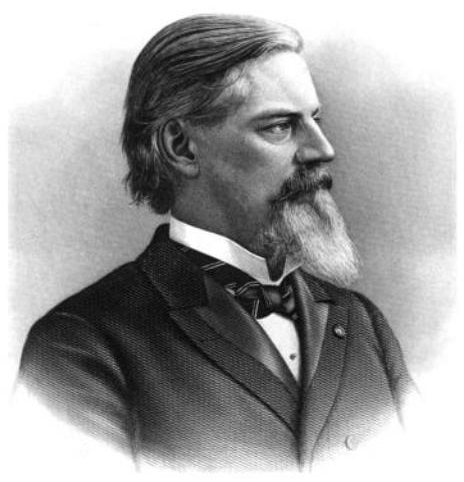

Member of the U.S. House of Representatives from Illinois
- In office March 4, 1879 – March 3, 1885
- Preceded by: Carter Harrison III (2nd); Charles B. Farwell (3rd)
- Succeeded by: John F. Finerty (2nd); James H. Ward (3rd)
- Constituency: 2nd district (1879-83); 3rd district (1883-85)

Personal details
- Born: George Royal Davis; January 3, 1840 Palmer, Massachusetts, US
- Died: November 25, 1899 (aged 59) Chicago, Illinois, US
- Resting place: Rosehill Cemetery, Chicago
- Party: Republican
- Spouse: Gertrude Schulin (m. 1867)
- Education: Williston Seminary
- Occupation: Director General, financial agent, Senior Colonel, treasurer
- Profession: Business, law

Military service
- Allegiance: United States
- Branch/service: Union Army; Illinois National Guard
- Years of service: 1862–1865; 18??-18??
- Rank: Colonel
- Unit: 8th Massachusetts Militia; 2nd Massachusetts Heavy Artillery
- Commands: 3rd Rhode Island Cavalry; 1st Regiment, Illinois National Guard
- Battles/wars: American Civil War

George Royal Davis (January 3, 1840 – November 25, 1899) was a U.S. representative from Illinois.

== Early life and education ==
George R. Davis was born in Palmer, Massachusetts on January 3, 1840. He completed classical studies at Williston Seminary, Easthampton, Massachusetts, and was graduated in 1860. Afterwards he studied law.

He married Gertrude Schulin on July 25, 1867.

== Civil War military service ==
Davis entered the Union Army in July 1862 and served as captain in the Eighth Regiment, Massachusetts Volunteer Infantry, and as major in the Third Regiment, Rhode Island Volunteer Cavalry.

== Career ==
=== Early career ===
Following the war Davis engaged in manufacturing, the insurance business, and as financial agent at Chicago, Illinois.

=== Military career ===
Davis later served as member of the State militia and senior colonel of the First Regiment, Illinois National Guard.

=== Political career ===
Davis was elected as a Republican to the 46th, 47th, and 48th Congresses (March 4, 1879 – March 4, 1885). He was not a candidate for renomination in 1884.

=== Business career ===
Davis chose to end his political career and resume his former business pursuits. He served as treasurer of Cook County, Illinois from 1886 to 1890. He served as director general of the World's Columbian Exposition at Chicago in 1893.

== Death ==
Davis died at his home in Chicago on November 25, 1899, and was interred in Rosehill Cemetery.

U.S. House of Representatives
Preceded by Carter H. Harrison	Member of the U.S. House of Representatives from Illinois's 2nd congressional district 1879-1883	Succeeded by John F. Finerty
Preceded by Charles B. Farwell	Member of the U.S. House of Representatives from Illinois's 3rd congressional district 1883-1885	Succeeded by James H. Ward
