= Frank Lawler =

American politician

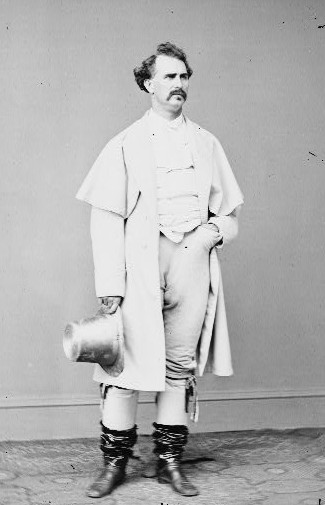

Member of the U.S. House of Representatives from Illinois's 2nd district
- In office March 4, 1885 – March 3, 1891
- Preceded by: John F. Finerty
- Succeeded by: Lawrence E. McGann

Chicago Alderman
- In office 1895 – January 17, 1896 Serving with John Powers
- Preceded by: Thomas Gallagher
- Succeeded by: Thomas Gallagher
- Constituency: 19th ward
- In office 1876–1886 Serving with James O'Brien (1876–77); Richard M. Oliver (1877–79); Thomas Purcell (1769–85); Redmond F. Sheridan (1885–88)
- Preceded by: Patrick C. McDonald
- Succeeded by: Lawrence A. Yore
- Constituency: 8th ward

Personal details
- Born: June 25, 1842 Rochester, New York, U.S.
- Died: January 17, 1896 (aged 53) Chicago, Illinois, U.S.
- Party: Democratic

Frank Lawler (June 25, 1842 – January 17, 1896) was a U.S. representative from Illinois.

== Biography ==
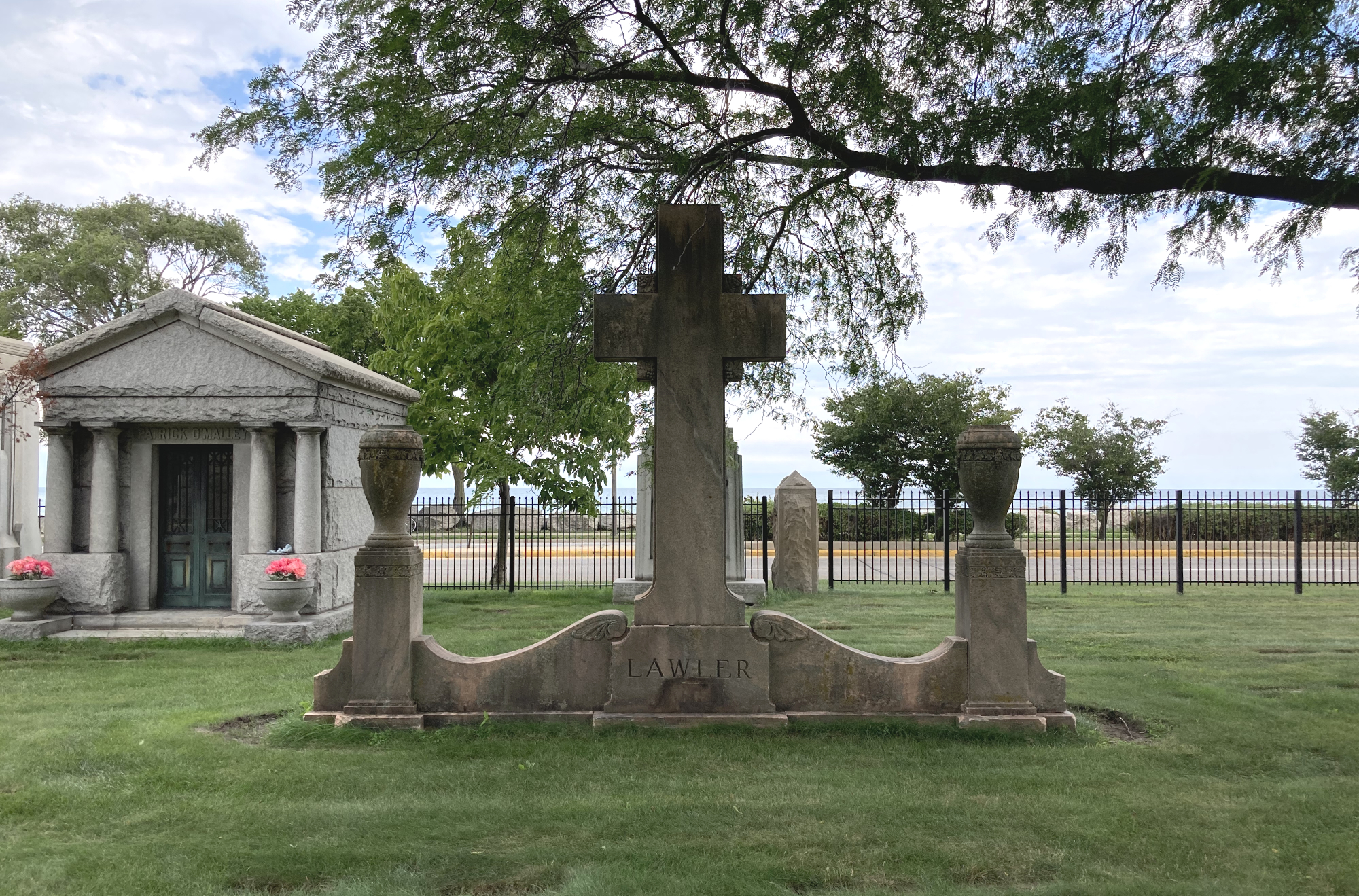
Lawler's grave at Calvary Cemetery

Born in Rochester, New York, Lawler attended public schools. He moved with his parents to Chicago, Illinois in 1854. He was a newsagent on a railroad for several years and also a brakeman. He learned the trade of shipbuilders. He was active in organizing trade and labor unions and served as president of the Ship Carpenters and Calkers' Association. He was employed in the Chicago post office as a letter carrier from 1869–1877. He served as a member of the city council from 1876 to 1885. He engaged in business as a liquor merchant in 1878.

Lawler was elected as a Democrat to the Forty-ninth, Fiftieth, and Fifty-first Congresses (March 4, 1885 – March 3, 1891). He was an unsuccessful candidate for sheriff of Cook County in 1891. He was an unsuccessful candidate for election in 1895 to the Fifty-fourth Congress.

Lawler was again elected a member of the board of aldermen in 1896 and served until his death in Chicago at age 53. A Catholic, he was interred in Calvary Cemetery in Evanston.

U.S. House of Representatives
Preceded by John F. Finerty	Member of the U.S. House of Representatives from Illinois's 2nd congressional district 1885-1891	Succeeded by Lawrence E. McGann
