= Lawrence E. McGann =

American politician

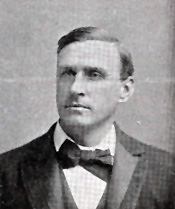

Member of the U.S. House of Representatives from Illinois
- In office March 4, 1891 – December 27, 1895
- Preceded by: Frank Lawler (2nd); Allan C. Durborow, Jr. (3rd)
- Succeeded by: William Lorimer (2nd); Hugh R. Belknap (3rd)
- Constituency: 2nd district (1891-93); 3rd district (1893-95)

Personal details
- Born: February 2, 1852 Attymon, County Galway, Ireland
- Died: July 22, 1928 (aged 76) Oak Park, Illinois, U.S.
- Party: Democratic

Lawrence Edward McGann (February 2, 1852 – July 22, 1928), born in Dooghcloon, near Attymon, County Galway, Ireland, was a U.S. representative from Illinois from 1891 to 1895. He was a Chicago Democrat.

== Early life ==
McGann immigrated to the United States in 1855 with his mother a year after his father died. They settled in Milford, MA where he attended the public schools. They moved to Chicago, IL in 1865 and he worked at the boot and shoe trade until 1879 when he was employed as a clerk in the service of the city.

== Political career ==
In 1885 McGann was appointed superintendent of streets January 1, 1885, and served until his resignation in May 1891 when he was elected as a Democrat to the Fifty-second and Fifty-third Congresses. In congress he served as chairman of the Committee on Labor (Fifty-third Congress). In the 1894 election he was at first named the victor by 31 won votes and was seated in the Fifty-fourth Congress where he served from March 4, 1895, until December 27, 1895. Hugh R. Belknap, who at first count lost the 1894 election, contested it and after a recount showed he had won, McGann conceded the race without an investigation.

McGann went on to a long career in local service and business. He was president of the Chicago General Railways in 1896 and 1897 and was a large investor in the local streetcars. He then served as commissioner of public works of Chicago from 1898-1901 and again from 1911-1915; and city controller from 1901-1907. He resided in Oak Park, IL, until his death in that city on July 22, 1928. He was buried in Mount Olivet Cemetery in Chicago.

U.S. House of Representatives
| Preceded by Frank Lawler | Member of the U.S. House of Representatives from Illinois's 2nd congressional district 1891-1895 | Succeeded by William Lorimer |
| Preceded by Allan C. Durborow, Jr. | Member of the U.S. House of Representatives from Illinois's 3rd congressional district 1895 | Succeeded by Hugh R. Belknap |
