= William Warfield Wilson =

American politician (1868–1942)

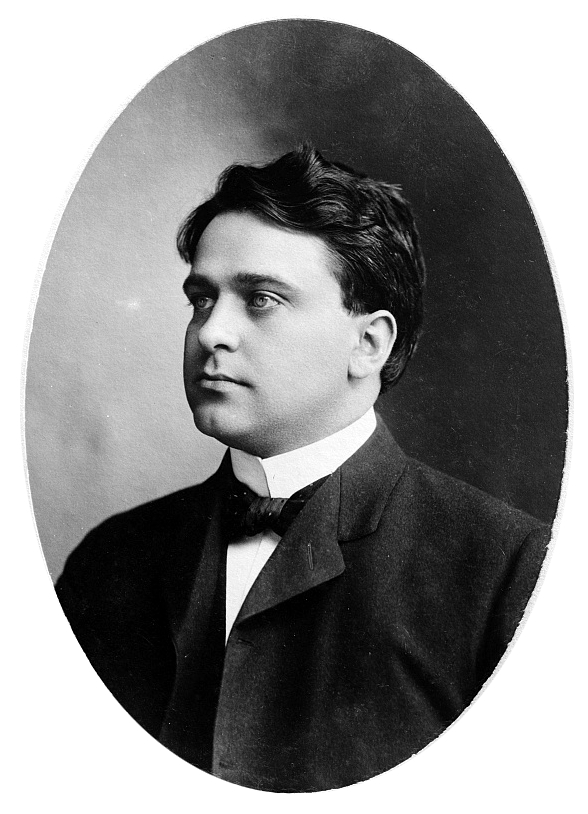
- Wilson, c. 1902

Member of the U.S. House of Representatives from Illinois's 3rd district
- In office March 4, 1915 – March 3, 1921
- Preceded by: George E. Gorman
- Succeeded by: Elliott W. Sproul
- In office March 4, 1903 – March 3, 1913
- Preceded by: George Peter Foster
- Succeeded by: George E. Gorman

Personal details
- Born: March 2, 1868 Ohio, Illinois, U.S.
- Died: July 22, 1942 (aged 74) Chicago, Illinois, U.S.
- Party: Republican

William Warfield Wilson (March 2, 1868 – July 22, 1942) was a U.S. representative from Illinois.

== Biography ==
Born in Ohio, Illinois, Wilson attended public schools, and the University of Michigan at Ann Arbor. He graduated from the Chicago-Kent College of Law in 1893. He was admitted to the bar the same year and commenced practice in Chicago, Illinois.

Wilson was elected as a Republican to the Fifty-eighth and to the four succeeding Congresses (March 4, 1903 – March 3, 1913). He was not successful as candidate for election in 1912 to the Sixty-third Congress.

Wilson was elected to the Sixty-fourth, Sixty-fifth, and Sixty-sixth Congresses (March 4, 1915 – March 3, 1921). He was not a candidate for renomination in 1920

He was appointed general counsel of the Office of Alien Property Custodian of the United States Department of Justice in 1922, serving until 1927. In a memorandum written in 1924, Wilson condemned "acts of spoliation" that occurred in 1919-1920, first, under the watch of A. Mitchell Palmer, and then — his successor, Francis Patrick Garvan,

Lawyers dipped into the funds of the Alien Property Custodian to a shameful extent. ... Valuable properties were sold for a trifling consideration. ... The only advantage gained was by the purchasers, many of them friends of the Alien Property Custodian, who profited by getting large assets for inadequate prices. But the most shameful and inexcusable acts occurred after the Armistice. ... The opportunity to get something for nothing under the guise of patriotism induced wholesale conveyances of the property in the hands of the Custodian during 1919. Such sales could have no effect on the war, and were pure acts of spoliation. ... In this respect commercial "hostilities" were carried on down through 1920 for the profit of a few private individuals at the expense of the United States Treasury and of the national integrity.

After retiring from the Office of Alien Property Custodian, Wilsone resumed the practice of law. He died in Chicago, and was interred in Union Cemetery in Ohio, Illinois.

== Family ==
Wilson married Sarah M. Moore in 1892 and they had one son, Stephen Askew Wilson (1896-1987).

U.S. House of Representatives
Preceded by George P. Foster	Member of the U.S. House of Representatives from Illinois's 3rd congressional district 1903-1913	Succeeded by George E. Gorman
Preceded by George E. Gorman	Member of the U.S. House of Representatives from Illinois's 3rd congressional district 1915-1921	Succeeded by Elliott W. Sproul
