= Robert P. Hanrahan =

American politician

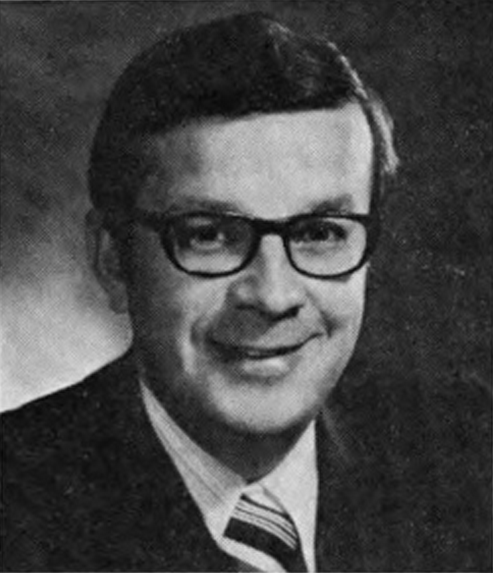

Member of the U.S. House of Representatives from Illinois's 3rd district
- In office January 3, 1973 – January 3, 1975
- Preceded by: Morgan F. Murphy
- Succeeded by: Marty Russo

Personal details
- Born: Robert Paul Hanrahan; February 25, 1934 Chicago Heights, Illinois
- Died: January 7, 2011 (aged 76) Vernon Hills, Illinois
- Party: Republican
- Education: South Suburban College, Bowling Green State University
- Profession: Teacher, administrator, guidance counselor

Robert Paul Hanrahan (February 25, 1934 – January 7, 2011) was a former U.S. representative from Illinois.

Born in Chicago Heights, Illinois, Hanrahan was educated in the public schools. He attended Thornton Community College (now South Suburban College) in Harvey, Illinois from 1952 to 1954. He earned a B.S. at Bowling Green State University in 1956, and a M.Ed. from there in 1959. He was a teacher, administrator, and guidance counselor from 1957 to 1967.

Hanrahan was elected auditor of Bloom Township from 1965 to 1967. Hanrahan was elected Cook County Superintendent of Schools from 1967 to 1971. He was appointed Midwest Regional Commissioner of Education in 1971.

Hanrahan was elected as a Republican to the Ninety-third Congress (January 3, 1973 – January 3, 1975).

During his term, he helped Simas Kudirka, a seaman from the Soviet Republic of Lithuania, to freedom by political asylum. He quite literally jumped ship, clearing the three metre gap between the Litva and the Vigilant in order to escape. “I want political asylum,” Kudirka said to US sailors. Admiral Ellis insisted that Kudirka should be returned to the Soviets, if they asked for him. The Litva had intercepted some of the communications, and sent an official note asking for Kudirka in which he was returned soon after and into a Soviet prison.

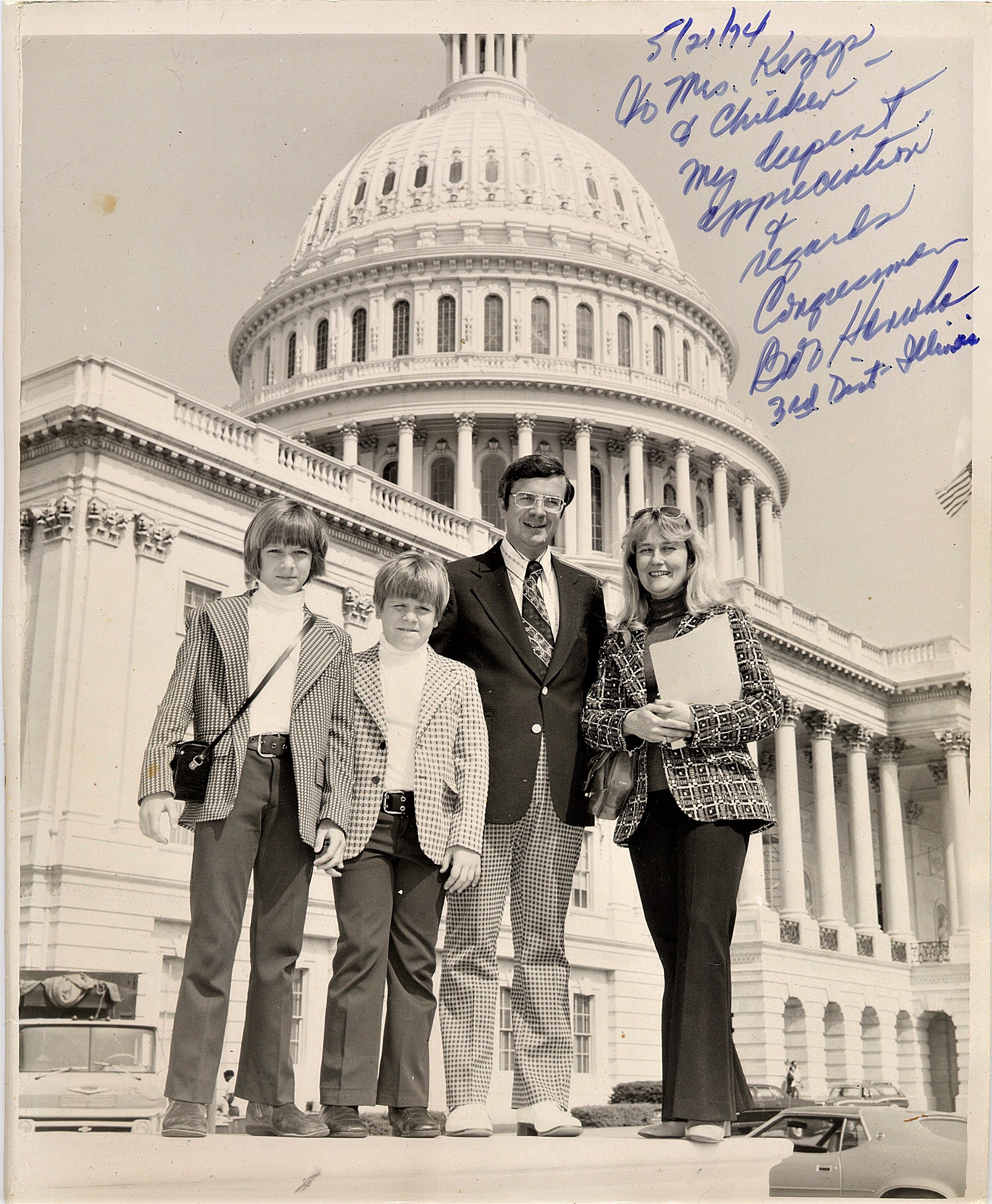
Met Film School

Massive fallout ensues from the event, with Lithuanian Americans protesting in Boston, Washington, and Cleveland. The story quickly goes national and lands on the front pages of The New York Times. President Richard Nixon himself declared outrage at the return of the defector and orders an investigation at the State Department, which Hanrahan assisted with. Kurdika was not there long. A Lithuanian émigré living in New York had discovered in 1973 that Kudirka's mother was actually born in the city. This meant Kudirka could now claim American citizenship. The State Department decided to take up the case and ask for Kudirka to be released from prison. Two months later, Kudirka and his family flew out of the Soviet Union, and landed in New York being welcomed by congressmen, including Hanrahan.

He was an unsuccessful candidate for reelection in 1974 to the Ninety-fourth Congress, but became a deputy assistant secretary for education at the Department of Health, Education and Welfare from 1975 to 1977. He served as president of RPH & Associates, Lake Forest, Illinois from 1977 to 1980, from 1987 to 1992, and from 1995 until his death.

Hanrahan was elected Lake County Commissioner from 1980 to 1982. He served as vice president of the Tobacco Institute, Washington, D.C., from 1980 to 1984. He was executive director of the American Security Council Foundation from 1984 to 1987, and a consultant from 1992 to 1995.

Hanrahan was married to his wife Barbara for 53 years until his death. He had three sons. He was a resident of Vernon Hills, Illinois, until his death from progressive supranuclear palsy at age 76 on January 7, 2011.

U.S. House of Representatives
| Preceded by Morgan F. Murphy | Member of the U.S. House of Representatives from Illinois's 3rd congressional district 1973-1975 | Succeeded by Marty Russo |
