= George E. Gorman =

American politician

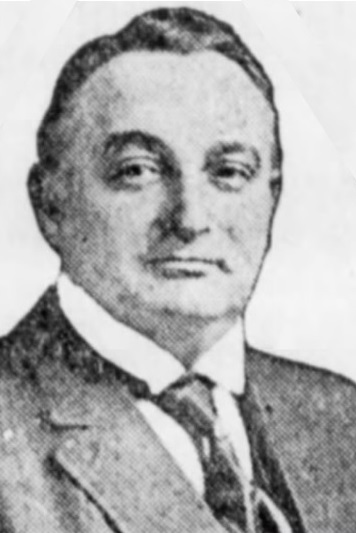
- Harris and Ewing photo. The Moore Messenger (Moore, OK), July 31, 1913.

Member of the U.S. House of Representatives from Illinois's 3rd district
- In office March 4, 1913 – March 3, 1915
- Preceded by: William Warfield Wilson
- Succeeded by: William Warfield Wilson

Personal details
- Born: April 13, 1873 Chicago, Illinois, U.S.
- Died: January 13, 1935 (aged 61) Chicago, Illinois, U.S.
- Resting place: Holy Sepulchre Cemetery, Alsip, Illinois; 41.689081°N 87.774697°W
- Party: Democratic
- Other political affiliations: Republican

George Edmund Gorman (April 13, 1873 – January 13, 1935) was a U.S. representative from Illinois.

== Biography ==
Born in Chicago, Illinois, Gorman attended the public schools of his native city. He was graduated in law from Georgetown University at Washington, D.C. in 1895. He was admitted to the bar in 1895 and commenced the practice of law in Chicago the following year. He served as assistant prosecuting attorney of Chicago 1897-1900.

Gorman was elected as a Democrat to the Sixty-third Congress (March 4, 1913 – March 3, 1915). He declined to be a candidate for reelection in 1914. He resumed the practice of law in Chicago. He served as assistant State's Attorney 1920-1928. He served as master in chancery of the circuit court from 1930 until his death in Chicago on January 13, 1935. He was interred in Holy Sepulchre Cemetery.

In 1923, Gorman unsuccessfully ran as a Republican nominee for the Superior Court of Cook County.

U.S. House of Representatives
| Preceded by William W. Wilson | Member of the U.S. House of Representatives from Illinois's 3rd congressional district 1913-1915 | Succeeded by William W. Wilson |
