= Hugh R. Belknap =

American politician

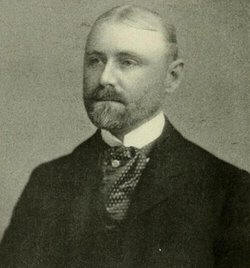

Member of the U.S. House of Representatives from Illinois's 3rd district
- In office December 27, 1895 – March 3, 1899
- Preceded by: Lawrence E. McGann
- Succeeded by: George Peter Foster

Personal details
- Born: September 1, 1860 Keokuk, Iowa, U.S.
- Died: November 12, 1901 (aged 41) Calamba, Laguna, Philippines
- Party: Republican

Hugh Reid Belknap (September 1, 1860 – November 12, 1901) was a U.S. representative from Illinois.

== Biography ==
He was born in Keokuk, Iowa on September 1, 1860 to William W. Belknap.

Belknap attended the public schools, Adams Academy in Quincy, Massachusetts, and Phillips Academy in Andover, Massachusetts. At the age of eighteen he entered the service of the Baltimore and Ohio Railroad Co. and worked in various capacities until he retired in 1892 to become superintendent of the South Side Rapid Transit Railroad of Chicago, Illinois. He successfully contested as a Republican the election of Lawrence E. McGann to the Fifty-fourth Congress. He was reelected to the Fifty-fifth Congress and served from December 27, 1895, to March 3, 1899. He was an unsuccessful candidate for reelection in 1898 to the Fifty-sixth Congress. He resided in Chicago until 1901.

In March 1899, Belknap was appointed a Volunteer Paymaster in the U.S. Army. Two years later he was appointed a major in the regular Army. In July 1901, Belknap (accompanied by his wife) sailed for the Philippines. He started on his first pay trip within two weeks after arriving in Manila. His first stop was at Calamba (on the island of Laguna), where he became ill and required surgery. Word was immediately sent to Major Elijah W. Halford, Chief Paymaster, and his wife. Upon Major Halford's arrival, Belknap told him: "Major, I have two requests to make. I want you to be kind as possible to my poor wife, whom I must leave far away from her home and among strangers. And I want you to pray for me." Belknap died the next day, November 12, 1901, from intestinal problems. He was interred in Arlington National Cemetery.

U.S. House of Representatives
Preceded by Lawrence E. McGann	Member of the U.S. House of Representatives from Illinois's 3rd congressional district 1895-1899	Succeeded by George P. Foster
