= Thomas Tallmadge =

American architect

Thomas Eddy Tallmadge
- Born: April 24, 1876; Washington, D.C., U.S.
- Died: January 1, 1940 (aged 63); Arcola, Illinois, U.S.
- Occupation: Architect
- Practice: Tallmadge & Watson
- Buildings: Robert A. Millikan House; Roycemore School (former Lincoln Street campus); Arthur J. Dunham House; E.H. Stafford House

Thomas Eddy Tallmadge (April 24, 1876 – January 1, 1940) was an American architect, best known for his Prairie School works with Vernon S. Watson as Tallmadge & Watson.

== Early life and education ==
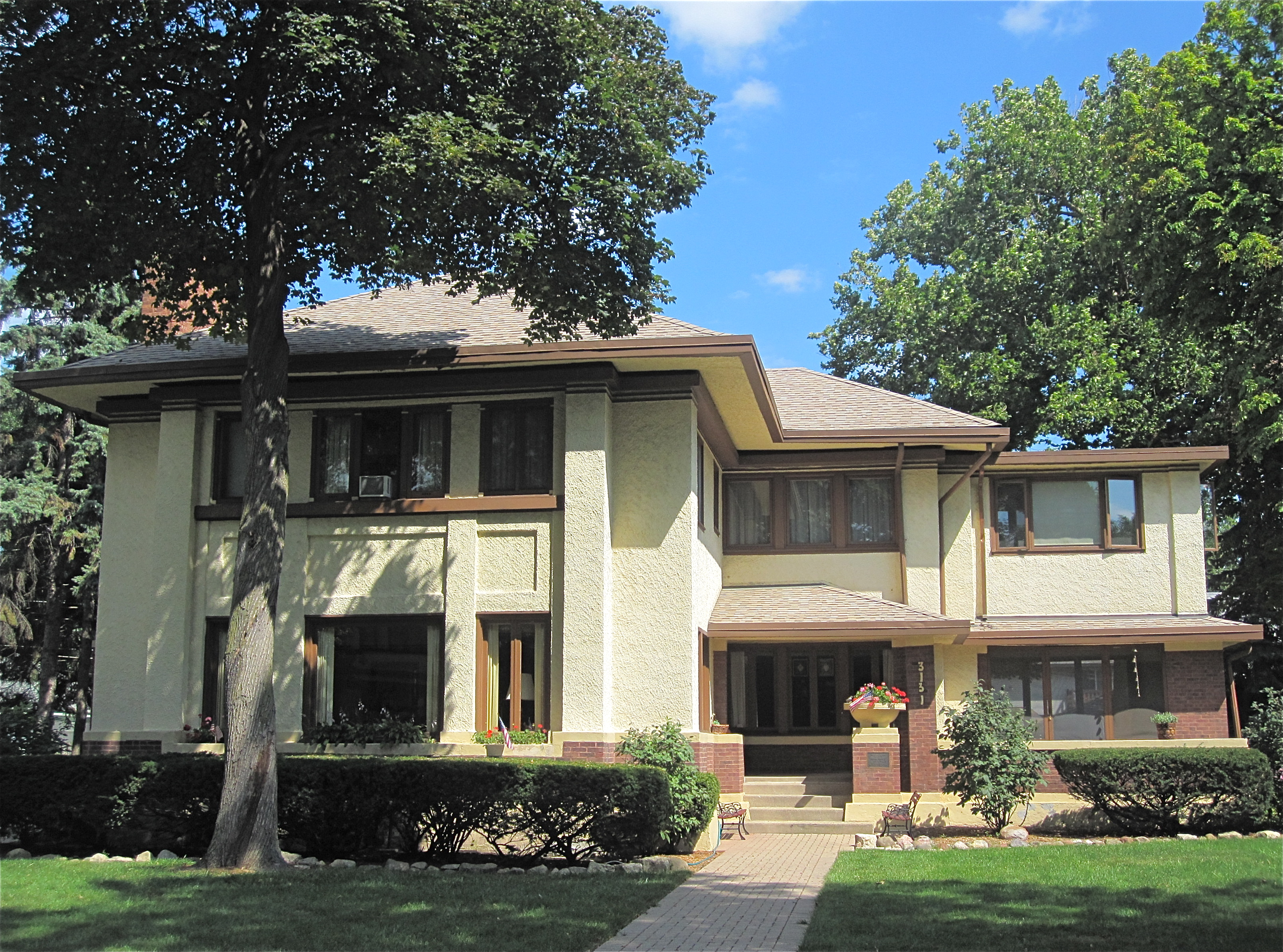
The Arthur J. Dunham House in Berwyn, Illinois, listed on the National Register of Historic Places

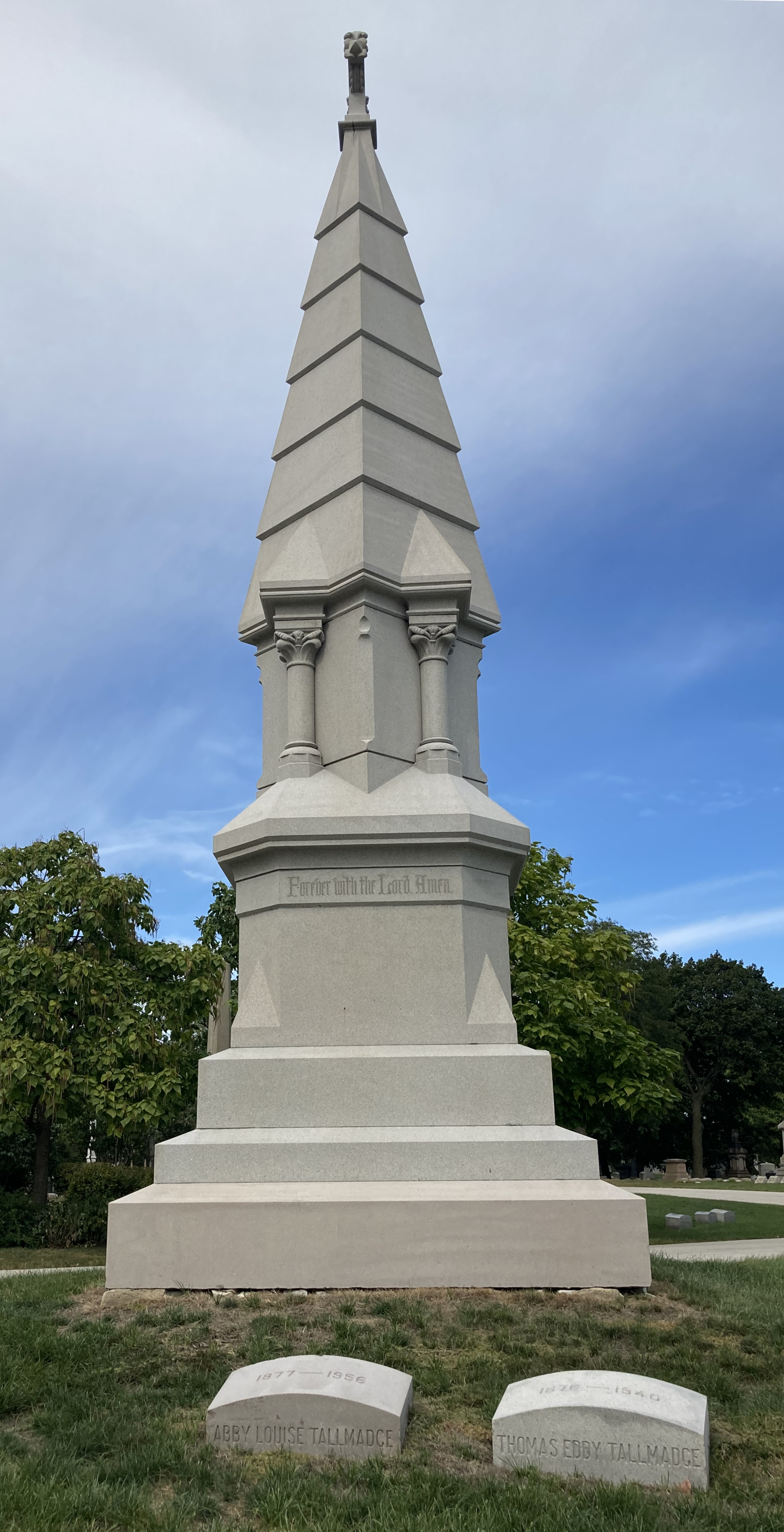
Tallmadge's grave at Graceland Cemetery in Chicago

Tallmadge was born in Washington, D.C., on April 24, 1876. He was raised in the Chicago suburb of Evanston, and graduated from Evanston Township High School. He attended the Massachusetts Institute of Technology, where he graduated in 1898 with a bachelor's degree in architecture. He returned to Chicago to study under Daniel H. Burnham, one of the city's most prominent architects. While working for Burnham, Tallmadge received a scholarship from the Chicago Architectural Club for his work "A Crèche in a Manufacturing District". He used the scholarship to travel through Europe.

== Career ==
Upon his return in 1905, Tallmadge decided to start his own architectural firm with fellow Burnham draftsman Vernon S. Watson. Although Watson was the chief designer, Tallmadge became the face of the firm due to his commitment as a historian and teacher. He taught at the Armour Institute of Technology from 1906 to 1926. Tallmadge is credited for coining the term "Chicago school" in an article for Architectural Review to describe the recent trends in architecture pioneered by Burnham, Louis Sullivan, and others. Tallmadge took sole control over his firm after Watson retired in 1936. Tallmadge later focused on publishing books instead of articles, completing three works.

== Death ==
On January 1, 1940, at age 63, Tallmadge was killed in an Illinois Central Railroad train accident near Arcola, Illinois. He is buried in Graceland Cemetery in Chicago along with many other notable Chicago architects.

== Bibliography ==
- The Story of England's Architecture (1934)
- The Story of Architecture in America (1936)
- Architecture in Old Chicago (1941, published posthumously)
