= Fred E. Busbey =

American politician (1895-1966)

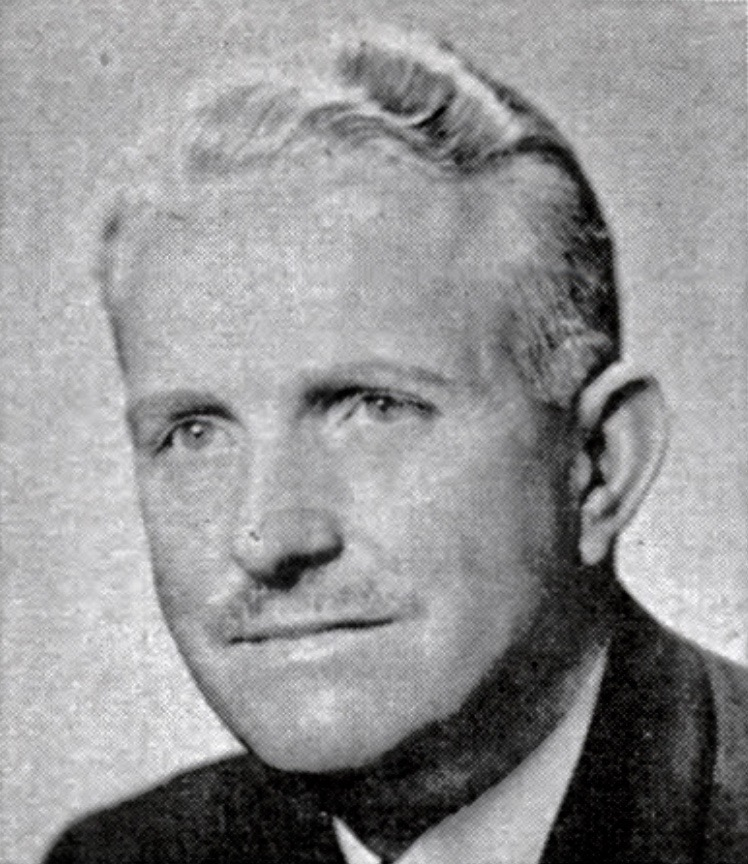

Member of the U.S. House of Representatives from Illinois's 3rd district
- In office January 3, 1951 – January 3, 1955
- Preceded by: Neil J. Linehan
- Succeeded by: James C. Murray
- In office January 3, 1947 – January 3, 1949
- Preceded by: Edward A. Kelly
- Succeeded by: Neil J. Linehan
- In office January 3, 1943 – January 3, 1945
- Preceded by: Edward A. Kelly
- Succeeded by: Edward A. Kelly

Personal details
- Born: February 8, 1895 Tuscola, Illinois, U.S.
- Died: February 11, 1966 (aged 71) Cocoa Beach, Florida, U.S.
- Party: Republican

Fred Ernst Busbey (February 8, 1895 – February 11, 1966) was a U.S. representative from Illinois.

== Biography ==
Born in Tuscola, Illinois, Busbey attended the public schools, Armour Institute of Technology, Chicago, Illinois, and Northwestern University, Evanston, Illinois. During World War I he enlisted on September 24, 1917, in the United States Regular Army and served overseas as a sergeant until after the Armistice, when he was made a battalion sergeant major in the 124th Field Artillery, 33rd Infantry Division, being discharged June 8, 1919. In 1930 he engaged in the investment brokerage business in Chicago.

Busbey was elected as a Republican to the 78th Congress (January 3, 1943 – January 3, 1945). He was an unsuccessful candidate for reelection in 1944 to the 79th Congress.

Busbey was elected in 1946 to the 80th Congress (January 3, 1947 – January 3, 1949). He was an unsuccessful candidate for reelection in 1948 to the 81st Congress.

Busbey was elected to the 82nd and 83rd Congresses (January 3, 1951 – January 3, 1955). He was an unsuccessful candidate for reelection in 1954 to the 84th Congress. He resumed the investment brokerage business until his retirement in 1958. He resided in Cocoa Beach, Florida until his death there and was interred in Mount Hope Cemetery in Chicago.

== See also ==
- List of members of the House Un-American Activities Committee

U.S. House of Representatives
Preceded by Edward A. Kelly	Member of the U.S. House of Representatives from Illinois's 3rd congressional district 1943-1945	Succeeded by Edward A. Kelly
Preceded by Edward A. Kelly	Member of the U.S. House of Representatives from Illinois's 3rd congressional district 1947-1949	Succeeded by Neil J. Linehan
Preceded by Neil J. Linehan	Member of the U.S. House of Representatives from Illinois's 3rd congressional district 1951-1955	Succeeded by James C. Murray
