= Elliott W. Sproul =

American politician

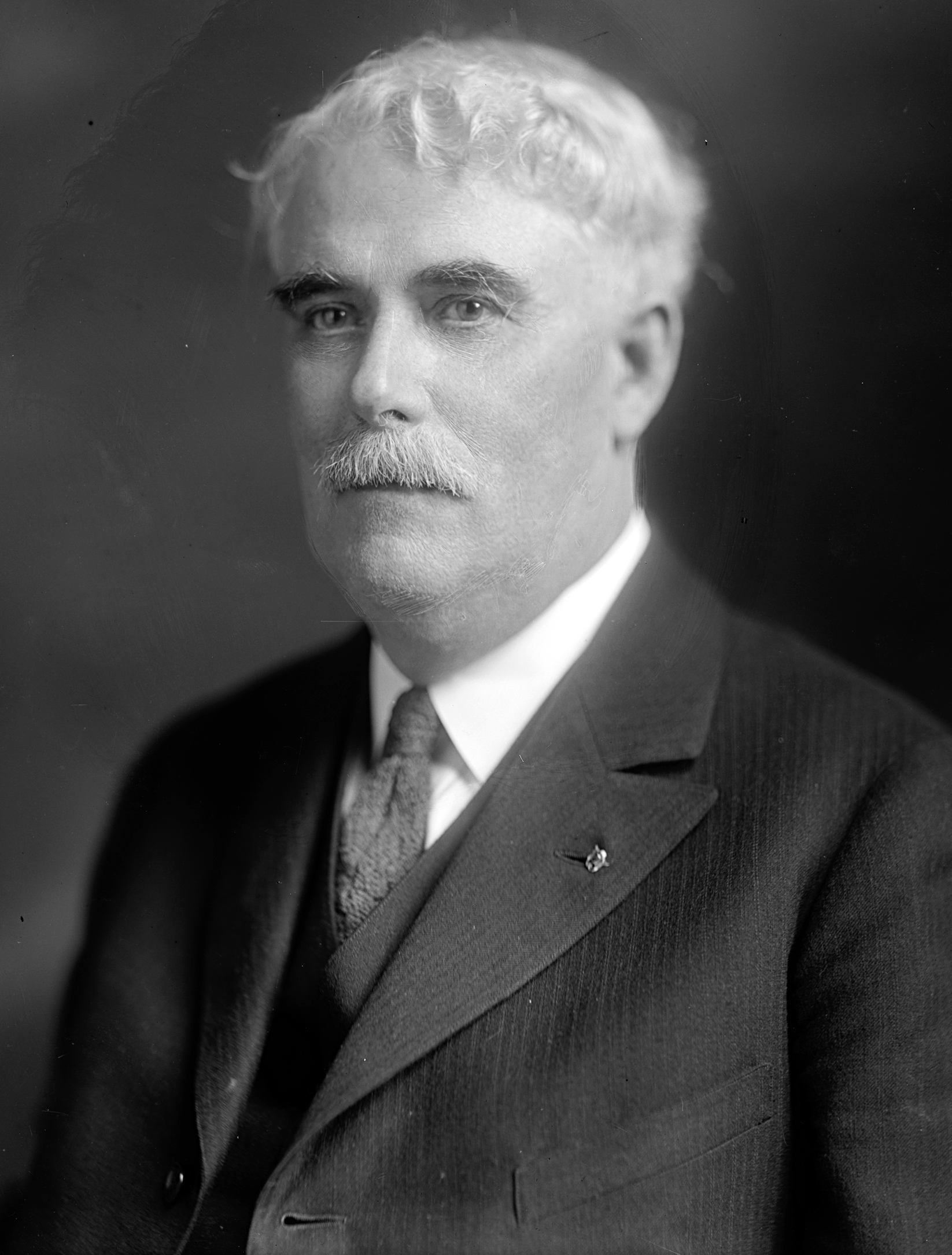

Member of the U.S. House of Representatives from Illinois's 3rd district
- In office March 4, 1921 – March 3, 1931
- Preceded by: William Warfield Wilson
- Succeeded by: Edward A. Kelly

Personal details
- Born: December 28, 1856 Apohaqui, Kings County, New Brunswick, Canada
- Died: June 22, 1935 (aged 78) Chicago, Illinois, U.S.
- Party: Republican

Elliott Wilford Sproul (December 28, 1856 – June 22, 1935) was a U.S. representative from Illinois.

== Biography ==
Born in Apohaqui, Kings County, New Brunswick, Canada, Sproul attended the public schools. He moved to Boston, Massachusetts in 1879 and to Chicago, Illinois in 1880, and engaged in the building and contracting business. He was naturalized in 1886. He served as member of the Chicago City Council 1896–1899. He served as delegate to the 1920 Republican National Convention. He served as member of the board of directors of the Chicago Public Library 1919–1921.

Sproul was elected as a Republican to the Sixty-seventh and to the four succeeding Congresses (March 4, 1921 – March 3, 1931). He was an unsuccessful candidate for reelection in 1930 to the Seventy-second Congress. He resided in Chicago until his death there on June 22, 1935. He was interred in Mount Hope Cemetery in Chicago, Illinois.

U.S. House of Representatives
Preceded by William W. Wilson	Member of the U.S. House of Representatives from Illinois's 3rd congressional district 1921–1931	Succeeded by Edward A. Kelly
