= Charles S. Wharton =

American politician (1875-1939)

Member of the U.S. House of Representatives from Illinois's 4th district
- In office March 4, 1905 – March 3, 1907
- Preceded by: George Peter Foster
- Succeeded by: James T. McDermott

Personal details
- Born: April 22, 1875 Aledo, Illinois, U.S.
- Died: September 4, 1939 (aged 64) Chicago, Illinois, U.S.
- Party: Republican

Charles Stuart Wharton (April 22, 1875 – September 4, 1939) was a U.S. representative from Illinois.

Born in Aledo, Illinois, Wharton moved to Chicago with his parents in 1878, attending the public schools. He graduated from the law department of the University of Michigan at Ann Arbor in 1896. He was admitted to the bar in 1896 and commenced practice in Chicago, Illinois. He served as prosecuting attorney for the town of Lake in 1899, and was appointed assistant city attorney of Chicago in 1903.

== Politics ==
In 1904, Wharton was elected as a Republican to the Fifty-ninth Congress (March 4, 1905 – March 3, 1907). He was an unsuccessful candidate for reelection in 1906 to the Sixtieth Congress. He subsequently resumed the practice of law in Chicago, Illinois.

Wharton served as member of the Board of Exemption and Government Appeal Agent at Chicago during the First World War and also served as an assistant corporation counsel in 1919. In 1920 he was appointed Assistant State's Attorney and served in this capacity until December 1923, when he resigned to resume private practice.

Wharton again resumed the practice of law in Chicago, Illinois, but in 1928, he was convicted of conspiracy in connection with the robbery of a mail train in Evergreen Park, Illinois, and was consequently disbarred. He was imprisoned in Leavenworth Prison from 1929 to 1931.

Wharton later operated a restaurant and was author of several books. He died in Chicago, Illinois, September 4, 1939. He was interred in Mount Hope Cemetery.

== Works ==
- The House of Whispering Hate (1931)

U.S. House of Representatives
Preceded by George P. Foster	Member of the U.S. House of Representatives from Illinois's 4th congressional district 1905–1907	Succeeded by James T. McDermott
