= Neil J. Linehan =

American politician (1895-1967)

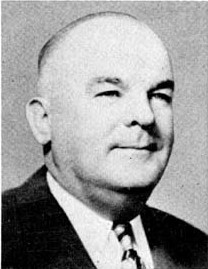

Member of the U.S. House of Representatives from Illinois's 3rd district
- In office January 3, 1949 – January 3, 1951
- Preceded by: Fred E. Busbey
- Succeeded by: Fred E. Busbey

Personal details
- Born: September 23, 1895 Chicago, Illinois, U.S.
- Died: August 23, 1967 (aged 71) Chicago, Illinois, U.S.
- Party: Democratic

Neil Joseph Linehan (September 23, 1895 – August 23, 1967) was an American electrical contractor and politician who served one term as a U.S. representative from Illinois from 1949 to 1951.

== Early life and military service ==
Linehan was born in Chicago, Illinois on September 23, 1895, the son of Cornelius J. Linehan and Nancy Ann (McNulty) Linehan. He attended the public schools of Chicago, graduated from John L. Marsh School in 1913, and was trained as an electrician.

During World War I, Linehan joined the United States Army and served in France with the 340th Infantry Regiment, a unit of the 85th Division. After the war, he was active as an electrical contractor and became president of Linehan Electric Company. He later served as a former national aide to the commander in chief of the Veterans of Foreign Wars.

== U.S. House of Representatives (1949–1951) ==
=== 1948 election ===
Linehan was elected as a Democrat to the 81st Congress, as part of the wave election associated with President Harry Truman's surprise victory, defeating Congressman Fred E. Busbey.

=== Tenure ===
During his short tenure in Congress, Rep. Linehan argued strongly in favor of appropriating $5 million to widen the Cal-Sag Channel. The House rejected a bill co-sponsored by Linehan that would have appropriated federal funds for the project, which Congress had authorized in 1946 but never funded.

He also supported the passage of a bill that would restore funding to Decatur and Chicago Veterans Administration hospital units.

=== 1950 and 1952 defeat ===
The Democratic Congressional Campaign Committee's executive secretary described Linehan's district in a 1949 report as "leaning Republicanwards." A spokesperson from the National Republican Congressional Committee argued that Linehan's district only flipped because of congressional apportionment shifts that gave more seats to Chicago and President Truman's successful campaign. A poll taken in the run-up to the 1950 campaign found his opponent, former Congressman Fred E. Busbey, in the lead with 52.2%.

Linehan lost his campaign for reelection in 1950 to the 82nd Congress, losing to Busbey who successfully took back his seat. He was also unsuccessful in his campaign fin 1952 to the 83rd Congress in the same seat, losing to Busbey again.

== Later career ==
He was Chicago district office of the Director of Price Stabilization in 1951, from which he resigned in December 1951. He later resumed his electrical contracting business.

== Personal life and death ==
Linehan died from a heart ailment in Chicago on August 23, 1967, and was interred in St. Mary Cemetery.

U.S. House of Representatives
Preceded by Fred E. Busbey	Member of the U.S. House of Representatives from Illinois's 3rd congressional district 1949-1951	Succeeded by Fred E. Busbey
