= Edward A. Kelly =

American politician

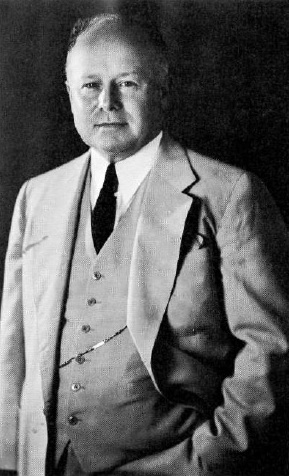

Member of the U.S. House of Representatives from Illinois's 3rd district
- In office January 3, 1945 – January 3, 1947
- Preceded by: Fred E. Busbey
- Succeeded by: Fred E. Busbey
- In office March 4, 1931 – January 3, 1943
- Preceded by: Elliott W. Sproul
- Succeeded by: Fred E. Busbey

Personal details
- Born: April 3, 1892 Chicago, Illinois, U.S.
- Died: August 30, 1969 (aged 77) Chicago, Illinois, U.S.
- Resting place: Saint Mary Catholic Cemetery, Evergreen Park, Illinois
- Party: Democratic

Edward Austin Kelly (April 3, 1892 – August 30, 1969) was an American businessman and politician from Chicago, Illinois. A Democrat, he was most notable for his service in the United States House of Representatives from 1931 to 1943 and 1945 to 1947.

== Biography ==
Kelly was born in Chicago, Illinois on April 3, 1892, the son of John J. and Nellie (O'Connor) Kelly. He attended the public schools of Chicago, including Longfellow School and Lake High School. In 1911, Kelly graduated from Orr's Business College in Chicago. He played semi-professional baseball for teams in Chicago, Normal, Lemont, Aurora, and DeKalb from 1912 to 1916.

From 1916 to 1920, Kelly was employed as an accountant with the Illinois Steel Corporation. During World War I he served in the Battery D, 332nd Field Artillery Regiment, a unit of the 86th Division. He was in the United States Army from 1917 to 1919 and attained the rank of sergeant. After his military service, Kelly engaged in the real estate and insurance businesses as the owner and operator of E. A. Kelly Co.

A Democrat, Kelly became active in local politics and was elected president of the 32nd Ward Democratic Association. In 1930, Kelly was elected to the United States House of Representatives. He was reelected five times, and served from March 4, 1931, to January 3, 1943. He was an unsuccessful candidate for reelection in 1942. After leaving Congress, Kelly worked as executive assistant to the chief justice of the Chicago municipal court and served as a member of the Chicago Planning Commission.

In 1944, Kelly was again elected to Congress. He served one term, January 3, 1945, to January 3, 1947. He was an unsuccessful candidate for reelection in 1946. After the end of his final term, Kelly returned to the real estate business. In 1948, then-rising Chicago politician Richard J. Daley succeeded in "buying" Kelly, which in turn led to Kelly stepping down from the Democratic National Committee. According to Daley, Kelly would ultimately support then-U.S. President Harry Truman in the 1948 U.S. presidential election, with his departure from the national committee also hurting the Kennedy family's efforts to oust Truman as the Democratic Party's presidential nominee at the 1948 Democratic National Convention.

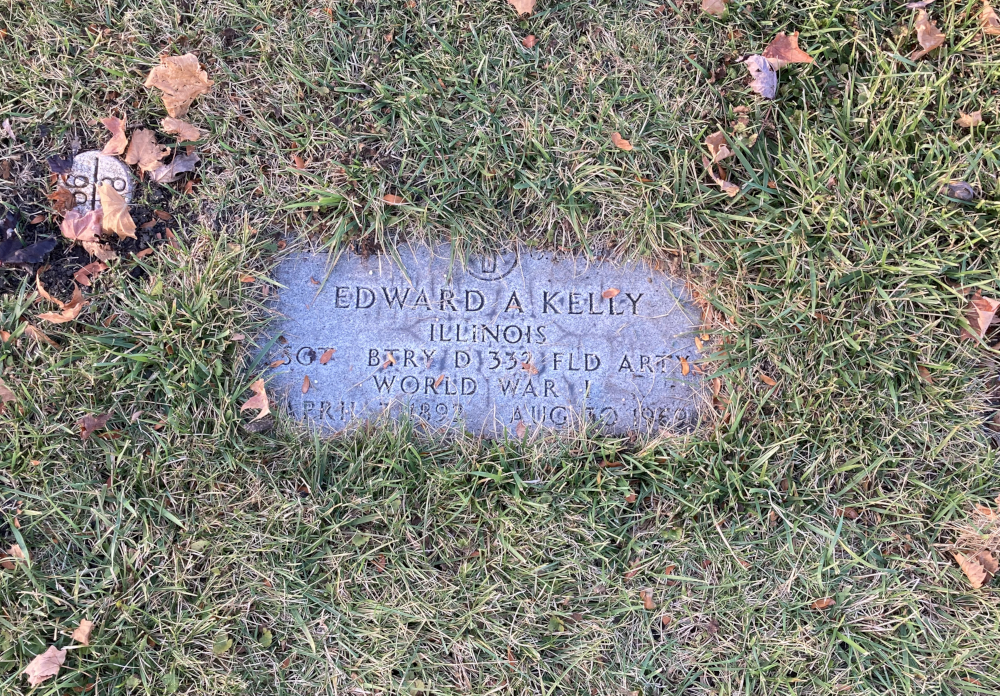
Kelly's grave at Saint Mary Catholic Cemetery

Kelly died in Chicago on August 30, 1969. He was interred at Saint Mary Catholic Cemetery in Evergreen Park, Illinois.

== Family ==
In 1922, Kelly married RoseMay R. Eulert. They were married until his death in 1969. They were the parents of two sons and a daughter—Edward A. Kelly Jr., Robert J. Kelly, and Rosemary.

U.S. House of Representatives
Preceded by Elliott W. Sproul	Member of the U.S. House of Representatives from Illinois's 3rd congressional district 1931-1943	Succeeded by Fred E. Busbey
Preceded by Fred E. Busbey	Member of the U.S. House of Representatives from Illinois's 3rd congressional district 1945-1947	Succeeded by Fred E. Busbey
