= James T. McDermott (politician) =

American politician (1872-1938)

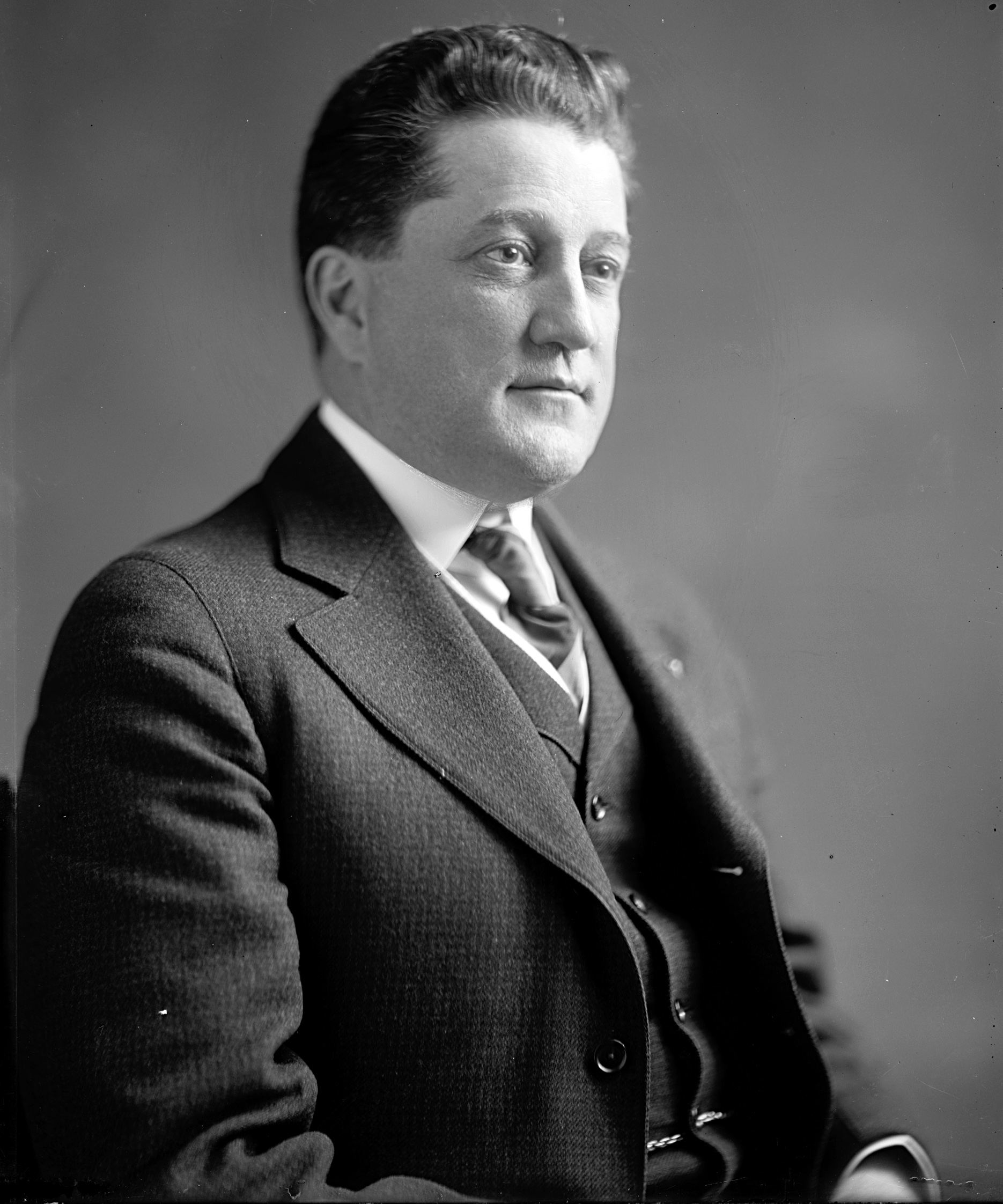

Member of the U.S. House of Representatives from Illinois's 4th district
- In office March 4, 1915 – March 3, 1917
- Preceded by: James T. McDermott
- Succeeded by: Charles Martin
- In office March 4, 1907 – July 21, 1914
- Preceded by: Charles S. Wharton
- Succeeded by: James T. McDermott

Personal details
- Born: February 13, 1872 Grand Rapids, Michigan, U.S.
- Died: February 7, 1938 (aged 65) Chicago, Illinois, U.S.
- Party: Democratic

James Thomas McDermott (February 13, 1872 – February 7, 1938) of Chicago was a Democratic U.S. representative from Illinois's 4th congressional district, 1907–14, 1915–17.

He was born and raised in Grand Rapids, Michigan, where he attended a Catholic High School. He later moved to Detroit. He was a telegraph operator there for about four years. In 1889 he moved to Chicago where he become a tobacco retailer.

U.S. House of Representatives
Preceded by Charles S. Wharton	Member of the U.S. House of Representatives from Illinois's 4th congressional district March 4, 1907 - July 21, 1914	Succeeded by Vacant
Preceded by Vacant	Member of the U.S. House of Representatives from Illinois's 4th congressional district March 4, 1915 - March 3, 1917	Succeeded by Charles Martin
