= Allan C. Durborow Jr. =

American politician (1857–1908)

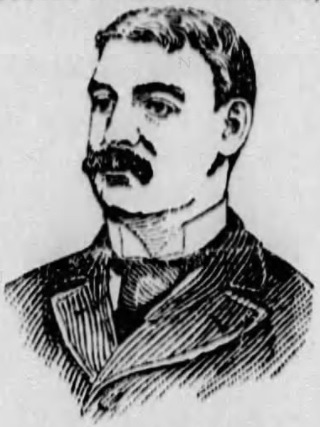
- Missoula Weekly Gazette (Missoula, MT), January 27, 1892

Member of the U.S. House of Representatives from Illinois's 3rd district
- In office March 4, 1891 – March 3, 1895
- Preceded by: William E. Mason
- Succeeded by: Lawrence E. McGann

Personal details
- Born: November 10, 1857 Philadelphia, Pennsylvania, U.S.
- Died: March 10, 1908 (aged 50) Chicago, Illinois, U.S.
- Party: Democratic

Allan Cathcart Durborow Jr. (November 10, 1857 – March 10, 1908) was a U.S. representative from Illinois.

Born in Philadelphia, Pennsylvania, Durborow moved to Indiana in 1862 with his parents, who settled in Williamsport. He attended public schools. He entered Wabash College, Crawfordsville, Indiana, in the fall of 1872. He graduated from Indiana University Bloomington in 1877. After residing in Indianapolis, he moved to Chicago, Illinois in 1880 and in 1887 became business manager of the Western Electrician, a trade magazine.

Durborow was elected as a Democrat to the Fifty-second and Fifty-third Congresses (March 4, 1891 – March 3, 1895). He was not a candidate for renomination in 1894. He engaged in the insurance business. He was an unsuccessful candidate for election in 1902 to the Fifty-eighth Congress. He died in Chicago, and was interred in Graceland Cemetery.

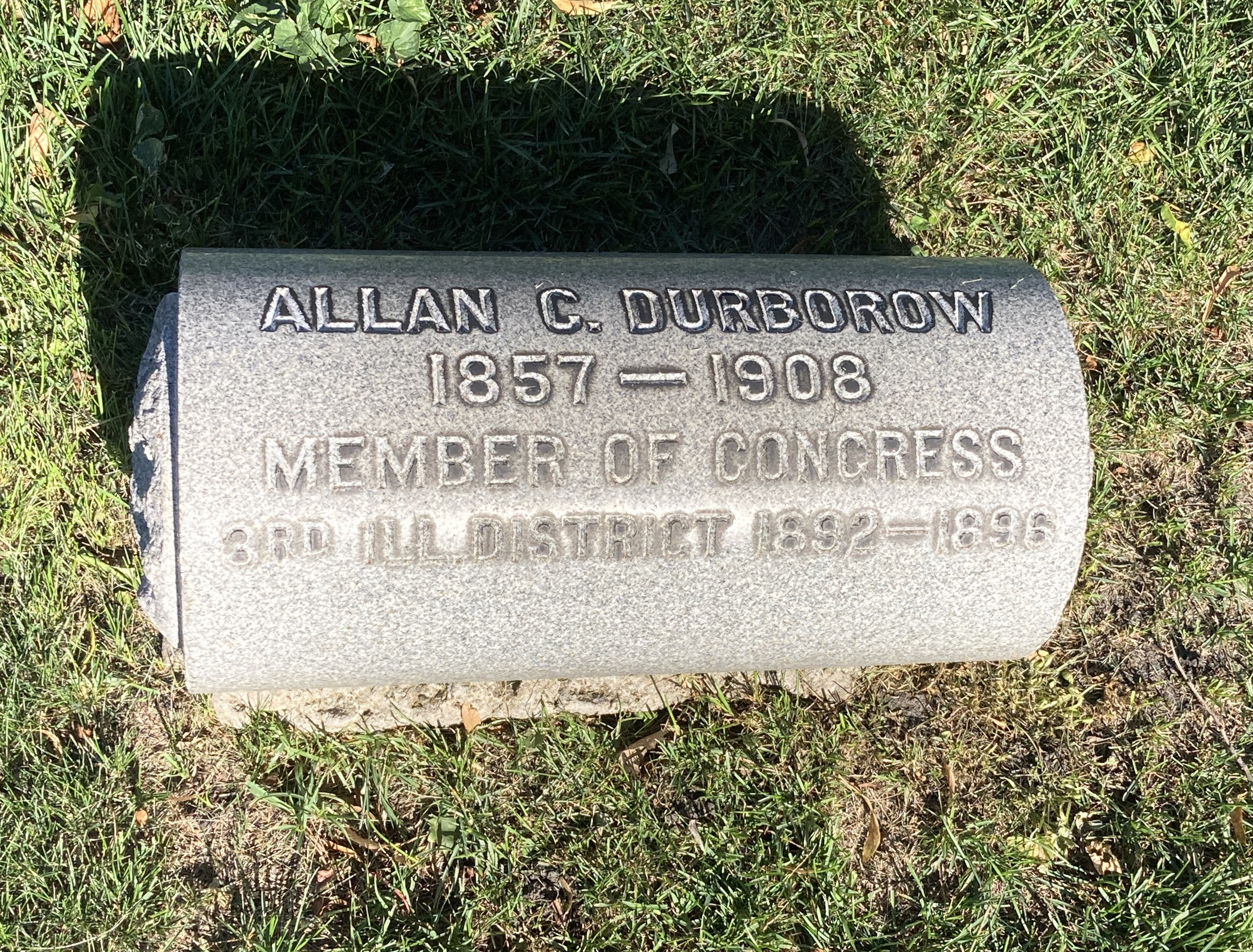
Durborow's grave, Graceland Cemetery

U.S. House of Representatives
Preceded by William E. Mason	Member of the U.S. House of Representatives from Illinois's 3rd congressional district 1891-1895	Succeeded by Lawrence E. McGann
