= George E. Purple House =

Historic house in Illinois, United States

- U.S. National Register of Historic Places
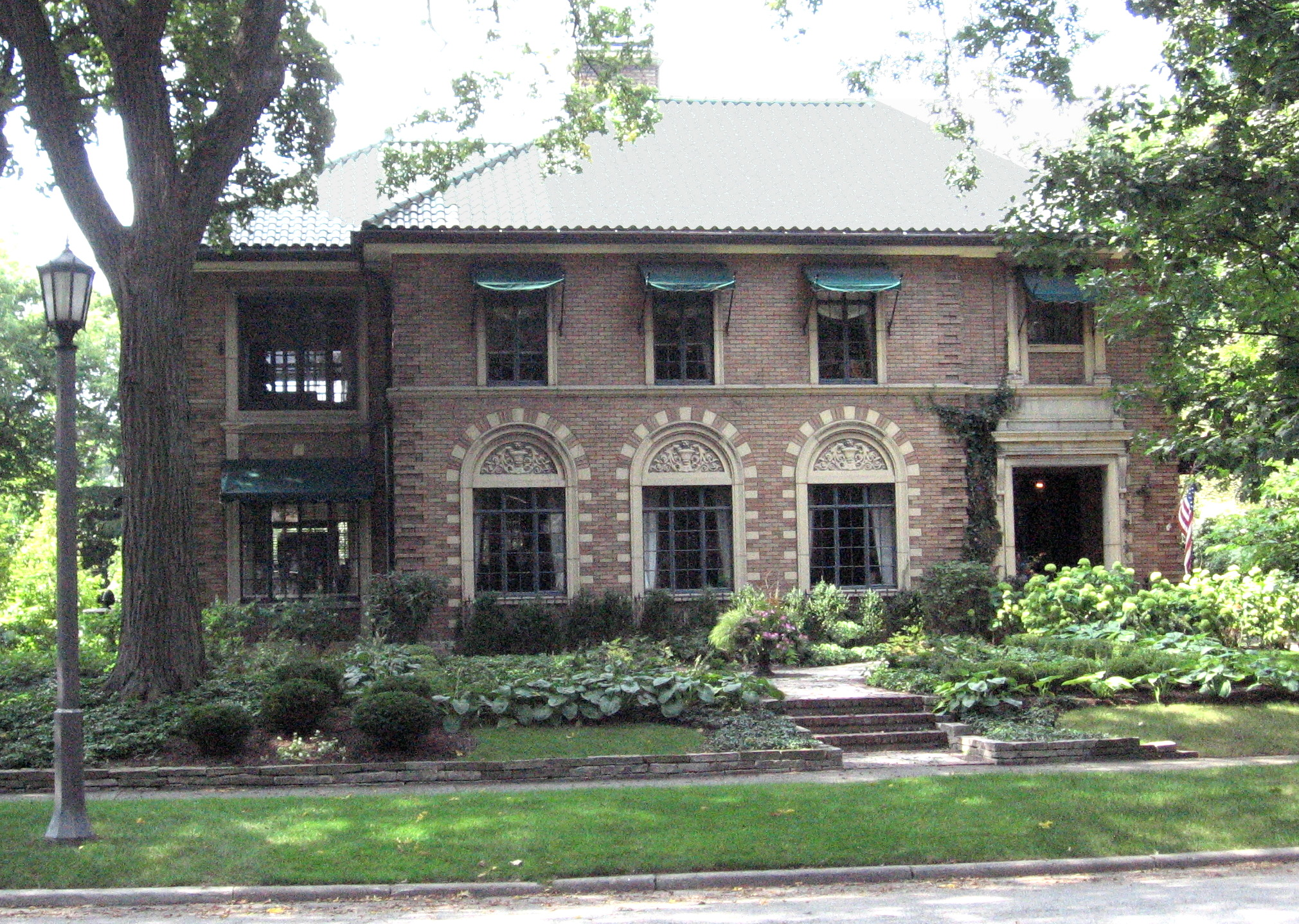

- Location within Illinois Location within the United States
- Location: 338 Sunset Ave., LaGrange, Illinois
- Coordinates: 41°48′36″N 87°53′2″W
- Area: less than one acre
- Built: 1928
- Architect: William G. Carnegie
- Architectural style: Renaissance
- NRHP reference No.: 05000845
- Added to NRHP: August 12, 2005

The George E. Purple House is a historic home located at 338 Sunset Ave. in LaGrange, Illinois, United States. The Italian Renaissance Revival style house was designed by William G. Carnegie and built in 1928. The house includes several characteristic features of Italian Renaissance Revival architecture, including a green tile hipped roof, large first-floor windows, overhanging eaves, decorative brackets, and extensive decorations; these decorations include bas-relief urns above the first floor windows and brick quoins on the corners. George E. Purple, founder of the Flexible Steel Lacing Company, commissioned the house; while Purple died in 1930, his family inhabited the house until 1944.

The house was added to the National Register of Historic Places on August 12, 2005.
