= Marty Russo =

American politician

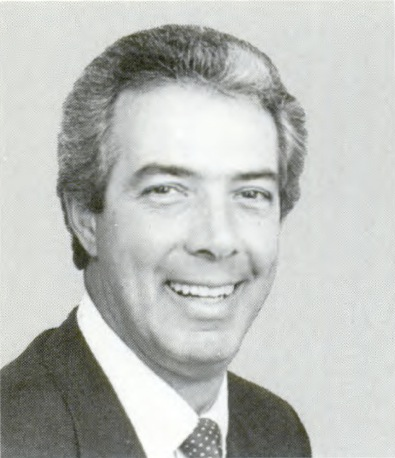

Member of the U.S. House of Representatives from Illinois's 3rd district
- In office January 3, 1975 – January 3, 1993
- Preceded by: Robert P. Hanrahan
- Succeeded by: Bill Lipinski

Personal details
- Born: Martin Anthony Russo; January 23, 1944 (age 82) Chicago, Illinois, U.S.
- Party: Democratic
- Spouse: Karen Russo
- Children: 2
- Education: DePaul University (BA, JD)

Martin Anthony Russo (born January 23, 1944) is an American politician, lawyer and lobbyist from Illinois.

== Education & legal career ==
He attended and graduated from St. Ignatius College Prep in 1961. He graduated from DePaul University with a Bachelor of Arts in 1965 and a Juris Doctor in 1967.

From 1971 to 1973 he served as an Assistant State Attorney for Cook County, Illinois.

== Political career ==
He was elected as a Democrat to the United States House of Representatives from Illinois and served from January 3, 1975, to January 3, 1993.

From 1979 to 1992, Russo served on the Ways and Means Committee, which from 1981 through 1994 was chaired by fellow Chicagoan Dan Rostenkowski. During his tenure, the Committee passed the Tax Reform Act of 1986. As Vice Chairman of the Subcommittee on Health and Chairman of the Task Force on Income Security, Russo became a vocal advocate for affordable health care for all Americans. He authored the single-payer health care reform proposal, the Universal Health Care Act of 1991 (H.R. 1300), which gained broad national attention and support.

== Primary loss ==
After the 1990 redistricting, his district was merged with the neighboring 5th District of fellow Democrat Bill Lipinski. Although the reconfigured district retained Russo's district number, he lost the March 17, 1992 Democratic primary to Lipinski, 38 percent to 56 percent.

== Lobbyist ==
Russo worked at the lobbying firm of Cassidy & Associates, rising to the position of CEO. He left the firm in 2010.

== Personal ==
Russo resides in McLean, Virginia.

U.S. House of Representatives
Preceded by Robert P. Hanrahan	Member of the U.S. House of Representatives from Illinois's 3rd congressional district 1975–1993	Succeeded by Bill Lipinski
U.S. order of precedence (ceremonial)
Preceded by Steve Buyer as Former U.S. Representative	Order of precedence of the United States as Former U.S. Representative	Succeeded by Robert E. Cramer as Former U.S. Representative
