= Arthur J. Dunham House =

Historic house in Illinois, United States

- U.S. National Register of Historic Places
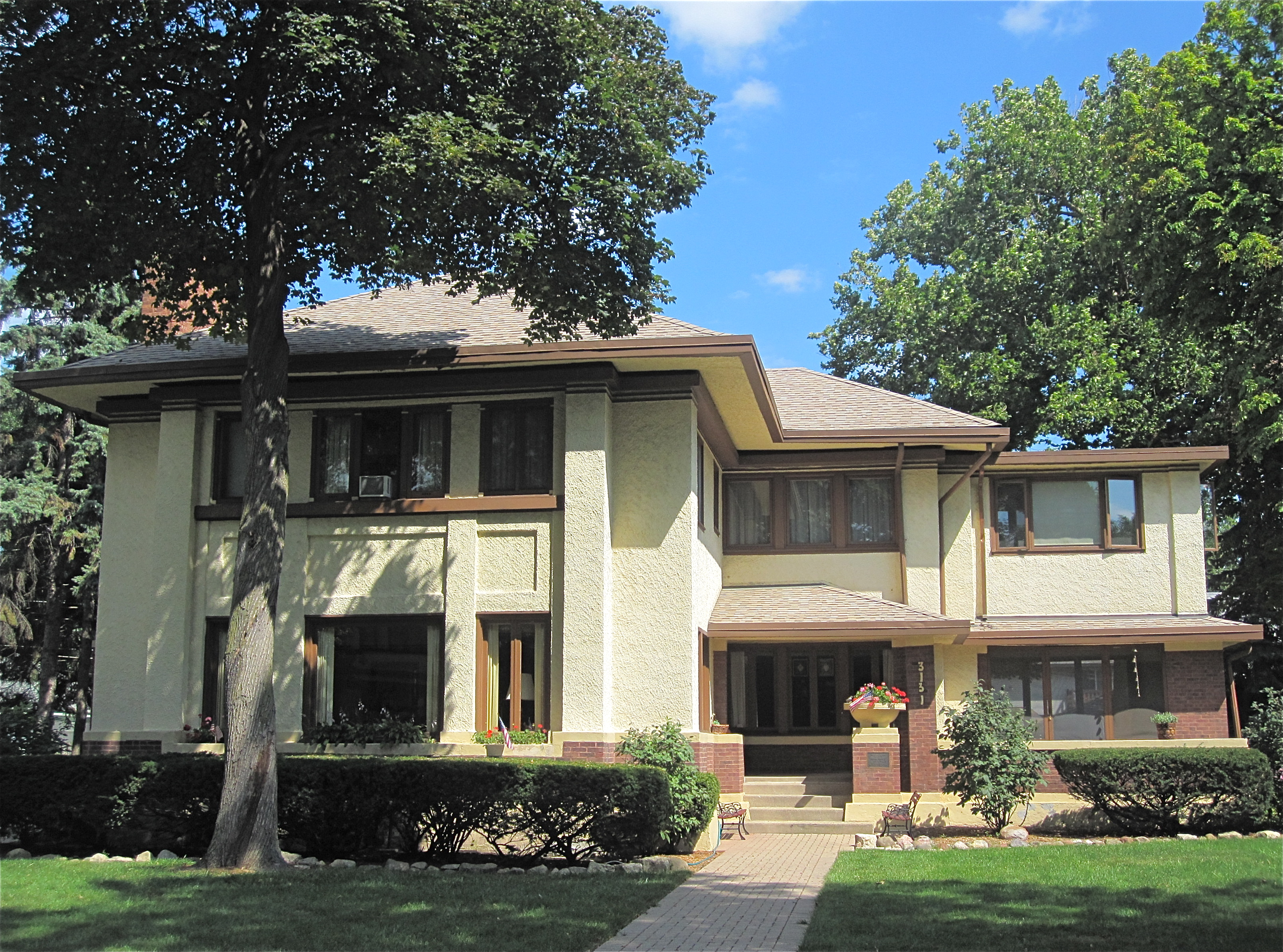

- Location within Illinois Location within the United States
- Location: 3131 S. Wisconsin Ave., Berwyn, Illinois
- Coordinates: 41°50′6″N 87°48′1″W
- Area: 0.5 acres (0.20 ha)
- Built: c. 1907
- Architect: Tallmadge & Watson
- Architectural style: Prairie School
- NRHP reference No.: 82002524
- Added to NRHP: February 11, 1982

The Arthur J. Dunham House is a house located at 3131 S. Wisconsin Ave. in Berwyn, Illinois, USA. The Prairie School house, built circa 1907, was designed by the Chicago architectural firm Tallmadge and Watson. The house's features exemplify the design elements of the Prairie School, with an emphasis on horizontal lines and open planes; these elements can be seen in the house's lateral porch, low hipped roof and open floor plan. The house is the only house in Berwyn with such a design, and since the same family has owned it since its construction, its design is basically intact.

The Arthur J. Dunham House was added to the National Register of Historic Places on February 11, 1982.
