= Charles Durborow =

American swimmer (1882–1938)

Personal information
- Full name: Charles B. Durborow
- Born: 1882
- Died: December 0 1938 (aged 56)
- Occupation: Bank clerk
- Height: 6 ft 0 in (183 cm)
- Weight: 210 lb (95 kg)

Sport
- Sport: Swimming

Charles B. Durborow (1882 - 1938) was a record setting distance swimmer from Philadelphia. He was a member of the Philadelphia Athletic Club.

== Personal life ==
Durborow was born in 1882. He started swimming in 1907. He was a bank clerk in Philadelphia by occupation. He died suddenly in 1938, at the age of 56.
