= Cornell Square =

- U.S. National Register of Historic Places
- U.S. Historic district
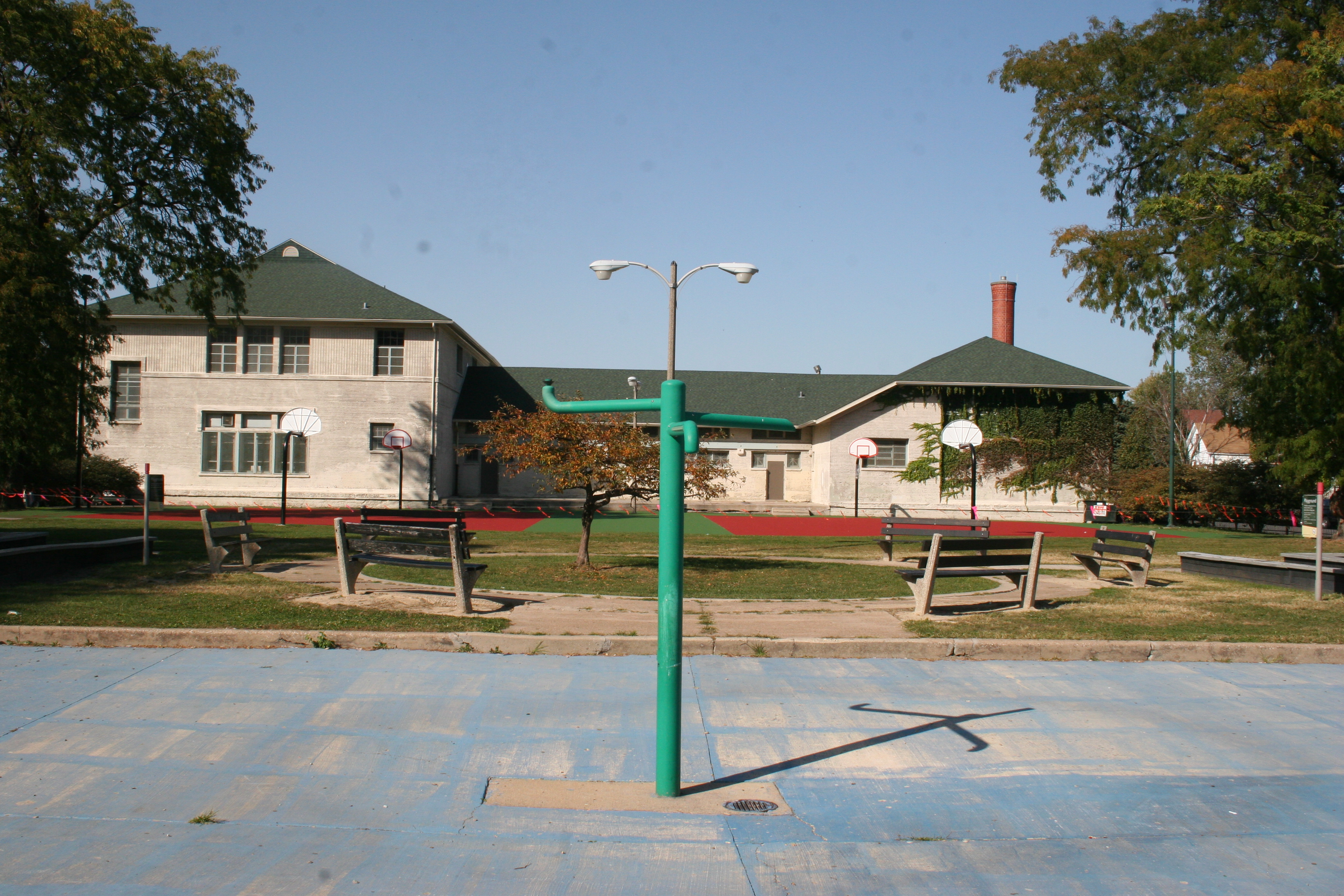

- Location within Chicago metropolitan area Location within Illinois Location within the United States
- Location: 1809 W. 50th St., Chicago, Illinois
- Coordinates: 41°48′08″N 87°40′16″W
- Area: 2.3 acres (0.93 ha)
- Architect: D. H. Burnham & Company; Olmsted Brothers
- Architectural style: Beaux Arts
- MPS: Chicago Park District MPS
- NRHP reference No.: 05000875
- Added to NRHP: August 11, 2005

Cornell Square is a public park at 1809 W. 50th Street in the New City community area of Chicago, Illinois. Opened in 1905, the park was one of many planned by the South Park Commission to provide parks in dense, poor South Side neighborhoods. The park was named for Paul Cornell, one of the Commission's board members. As with the South Park Commission's other early parks, landscape architects the Olmsted Brothers designed the park's layout while D. H. Burnham and Company designed its facilities. The park originally included a fieldhouse with gymnasium facilities, a swimming pool, athletic fields, and walking paths. The fieldhouse has a Beaux-Arts design and includes a painting of Ezra Cornell, the founder of Cornell University and Paul Cornell's cousin.

The park was added to the National Register of Historic Places on August 11, 2005.
