= Berwyn Health Center =

- U.S. National Register of Historic Places
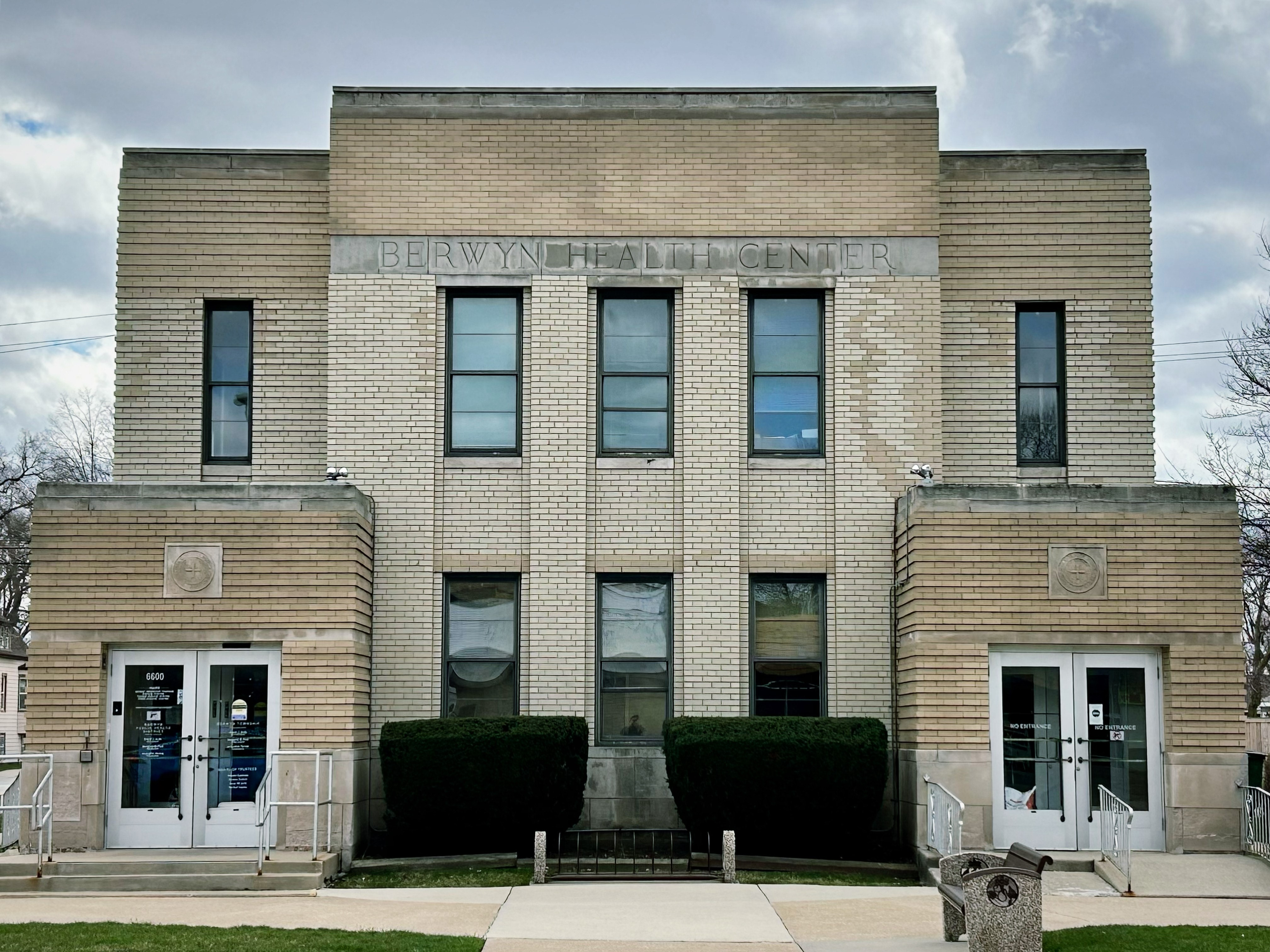

- Location within Chicago metropolitan area Location within Illinois Location within the United States
- Location: 6600 W. 26th St., Berwyn, Illinois
- Coordinates: 41°50′36″N 87°47′17″W
- Area: 0.2 acres (0.081 ha)
- Built: 1938-39
- Architect: Vladimir J. Novak
- Architectural style: Moderne, Art Deco
- NRHP reference No.: 02001352
- Added to NRHP: November 21, 2002

The Berwyn Health Center is a historic public health clinic at 6600 W. 26th Street in Berwyn, Illinois. Built in 1938–39, the building provided an expanded home for the city's health department. In addition to providing healthcare and leading vaccination efforts, the department was responsible for food inspection and Great Depression relief programs in the 1930s, and the new building gave it the space and resources it needed to accomplish its many duties. Along with the city's municipal building and post office, the health center was one of three buildings built in Berwyn with Public Works Administration funds in a three-year period. Architect Vladimir J. Novak, a Berwyn resident, designed the building using elements of Art Deco and Moderne architecture. Both styles were commonly used, often together, in PWA buildings; in the case of the health center, its Art Deco influence is visible in its geometric massing, while its horizontal banding is a typical Moderne feature. The building remains in use as a health clinic and government office.

The building was added to the National Register of Historic Places on November 21, 2002.
