= South Side Irish =

Southern Chicago Irish-American community

The South Side Irish is the large Irish-American community on the South Side of Chicago, Illinois. After 1945, a large-scale movement to the suburbs occurred because of white flight and the steady upward social mobility of the Irish. Although their population has spread out, Irish Americans continue to make up the majority of the ethnic white American population on the south side of Chicago, especially in Beverly, Canaryville, Bridgeport, Scottsdale, Mount Greenwood, Morgan Park, Garfield Ridge, Clearing, Evergreen Park, and Oak Lawn.

== History ==
Irish-Americans have had a presence on the South Side since the 19th century.

Since the 19th century, the ethnic Irish population in Chicago had been largely Catholic, and largely concentrated on the city's south side. Irish Catholics were often economically disenfranchised compared to other European ethnic groups, and often faced anti-irish sentiment or ethnic bias, especially by non-Catholic European groups. The Irish Catholic community was largely tight-knit with census records from the early 20th century suggesting areas like Canaryville, sometimes referred to as “Irish ghettos” being almost exclusively Irish.

By the 20th century, the Irish community began advancing both socially and economically. By the mid-20th century, the Irish had largely assimilated into American society, with many abandoning their Catholic faith, though many also maintaining it. Movement of the South Side Irish to the suburbs became pronounced in the 1940s and 50s due to white flight, highway construction, and governmental policies that encouraged suburbanization.

== South Side Irish St. Patrick's Day Parade ==
The South Side Irish Parade is one of three annual St. Patrick's Day parades in Chicago. The South Side Irish Parade originally started in 1979. There was another South Side parade called the Southtown Parade started in the early 1950s. The original Southtown Parade route was on 79th Street from Ashland Avenue to Halsted Avenue in the St. Sabina Parish in Auburn Gresham neighborhood, which had a large Irish population until white flight rapidly occurred in the late 1960s. Some years after Richard J. Daley was elected mayor in 1955, he moved the Southtown Parade downtown and changed the name to the St. Patrick's Day Parade, though it continued on its old route until at least 1958.

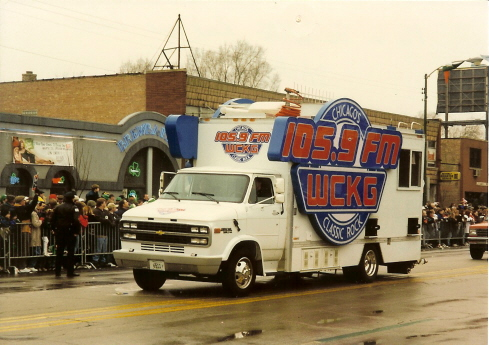
WCKG-FM Radio's "Rock 'N Roller" mobile studio the Chicago South Side Irish Parade

On Saturday, March 17, 1979, best friends and original creators George Hendry and Pat Coakley, along with their wives, assembled 17 children (known in parade lore as the "Wee Folks of Washtenaw and Talman") from the West Morgan Park area. The parade route began from the 109th block of S. Washtenaw and Talman streets. Marching to the parade theme of “Bring Back St. Pat”, and an original parade float of a baby buggy covered with shamrocks and the 32 county flags of Ireland, the South Side Irish Parade was born. The theme created by Hendry and Coakley was their way of wanting to bring back the South Side parade that they had enjoyed as children. They had delivered notices along the original parade route to encourage people to participate in the parade by standing and waving from their porches. Popularity continued to grow, and in 1980 it was moved to Kennedy Park with an increased 300 participants, including children, dogs, and a bag piper. It has grown since then and was moved to its current route, down Western Avenue from 103rd Street to 115th Street through the Beverly and Morgan Park neighborhoods, in 1981. The parade, led by the Chicago Stockyard Kilty Band and held on either the Sunday before or the Sunday of St. Patrick's Day every year, it was considered to be one of the largest St. Patrick's Day community celebrations outside of Dublin. The 2008 parade was the 30th annual parade, which was held on Sunday, March 9, 2008. Of the two Chicago parades, the other being in downtown, the South Side Irish Parade was the more raucous occasion. The 2009 parade was presumably the last parade. On March 25, 2009, the South Side Irish St. Patrick's Day Parade Committee announced that they were not planning to stage a parade in its present form in March 2010. They noted that the event had become too large for the community to accommodate and the difficulty in policing such a large crowd while maintaining the dignity of the event. However the South Side Irish St. Patrick's Day Parade Committee outlined a security plan, saying they "feel will bring this great neighborhood tradition back as the family friendly event it was meant to be". The parade returned on Sunday, March 11, 2012.

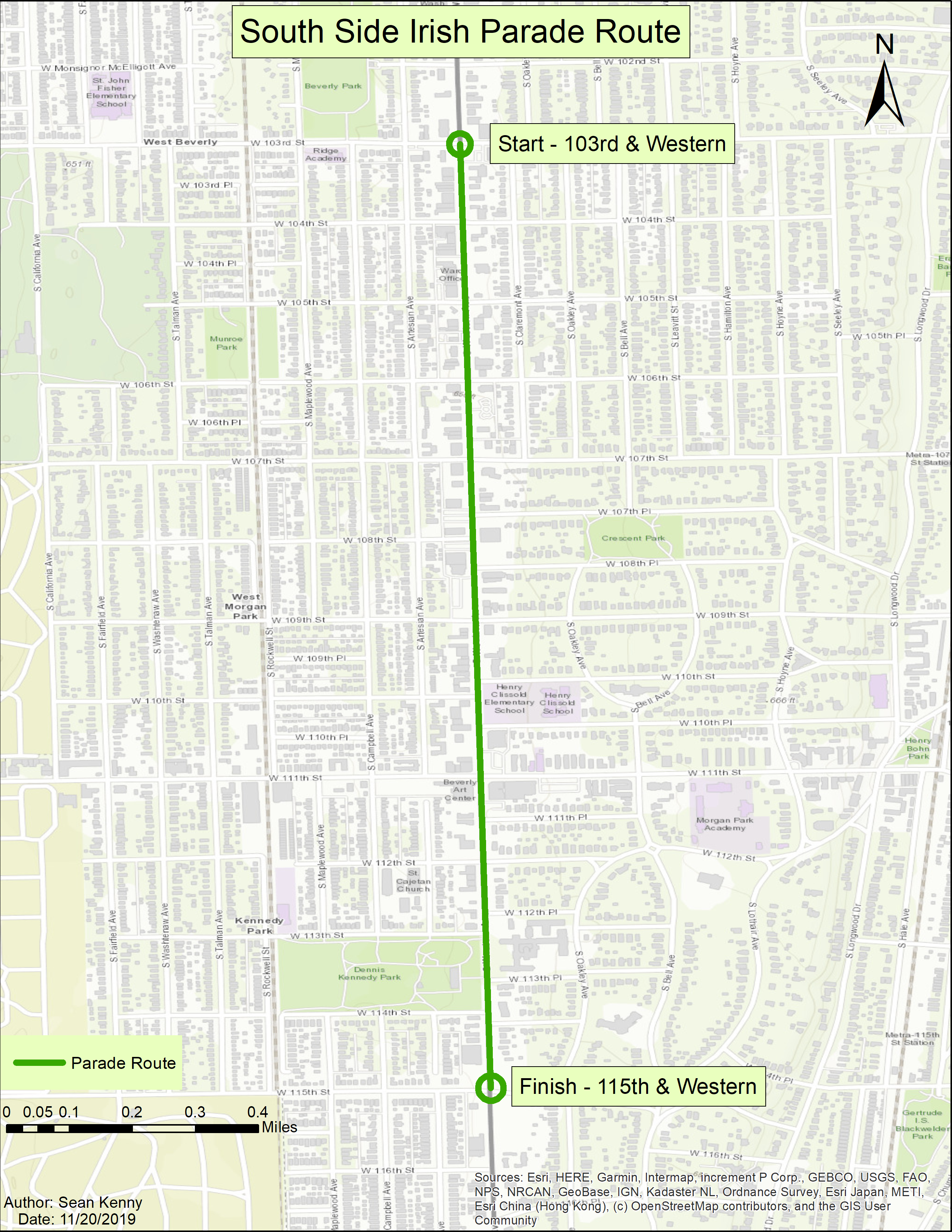
Illustrates the parade route which spans from 103rd St. to 115th St. along Western Ave.

== South Side Irish song ==
Written by Tom Black, Tom Walsh, and Terry McEldowney A.K.A. The Irish Choir

We're the Windy City Irish-where the craic is always best
Where every day is Paddy's Day and everyone's a guest
If you're Irish on the North Side or Irish on the West
Welcome to the South Side come join our Irish Fest!

(Chorus) We're the South Side Irish as our fathers were before
We come from the Windy City and we're Irish to the core
From Bridgeport to Beverly from Midway to South Shore
We're the South Side Irish-Let's sing it out once more!

Our parents came from Mayo, from Cork and Donegal.
We come from Sabina's, St. Kilian and St. Gall
Leo, Visitation, Little Flower and the rest.
The South Side parishes are mighty-they're the best!

Chorus

We live on the South Side-Mayor Daley lived here too
The Greatest Irish Leader that Chicago ever knew
he was always proud of his South Side Irish roots!
So here's to his honor to his memory we'll be true.

Chorus

We sing the songs our fathers sang when they were growing up
Rebel songs of Erin's Isle in South Side Irish Pubs
and when it comes to baseball-we have two favorite clubs
The Go-Go White Sox... and whoever plays the Cubs!

== Notable South Side Irish people ==
- Steve Allen
- Edward M. Burke
- Emmet F. Byrne
- Marty Casey
- George Connor
- Frank J. Corr
- John Coughlin
- Kevin Cronin
- John P. Daley
- Richard J. Daley
- Richard M. Daley
- William M. Daley
- Tom Dart
- Thomas A. Doyle
- Finley Peter Dunne
- Martin Patrick Durkin
- Bil Dwyer
- Jim Dwyer
- Nancy Faust
- James T. Farrell
- Edward Rowan Finnegan
- Michael Flatley
- Terrance Gainer
- James Hickey
- Brian K. Hopkins
- Michael J. Howlett
- Dan Hynes
- Edward A. Kelly
- Edward Joseph Kelly
- Michael Kenna
- Martin H. Kennelly
- Lisa Madigan
- Michael Madigan
- Jenny McCarthy
- Tim McCarthy
- Frank McErlane
- Lawrence E. McGann
- P.H. Moynihan
- Morgan F. Murphy
- William T. Murphy
- James C. Murray
- Kevin J. O'Connor
- Catherine O'Leary
- Jim O'Leary
- Patrick O'Malley
- John R. Powers
- Aidan Quinn
- James M. Ragen
- John C. Reilly
- Robin Tunney
- Thomas M. Tunney
- Ed Walsh
- George Wendt

=== Fictional ===
The Gallaghers of Shameless are from the South Side.

== See also ==
- Beverly, Chicago
- Bridgeport, Chicago
- Mount Greenwood, Chicago
- Clearing, Chicago
- Garfield Ridge, Chicago
- Canaryville, Chicago
- Evergreen Park, IL
- Oak Lawn, IL
