= Bernard Clare =

1946 novel by James T. Farrell

- Author: James T. Farrell
- Publisher: Vanguard Press
- Publication date: 1946

Bernard Clare is a 1946 novel by James T. Farrell. It was the first novel in a trilogy following the writer Bernard Carr. The character's name was changed from Clare to Carr following a libel suit from a man named Bernard Clare. Farrell won the libel case, with the court holding that it was "inconceivable that any sensible person could assume...that it purported to refer to the life and career of the [real] Bernard Clare" The book follows a twenty-one year old novelist who moves from Chicago to New York and becomes involved in radical politics. Unlike the protagonists of the Studs Lonigan and Danny O'Neill novels, Bernard Carr was the first character Farrell had written who was also a novelist and involved with literature.
