= Chicago Stock Yard Kilty Band =

American pipe band (1921–present)

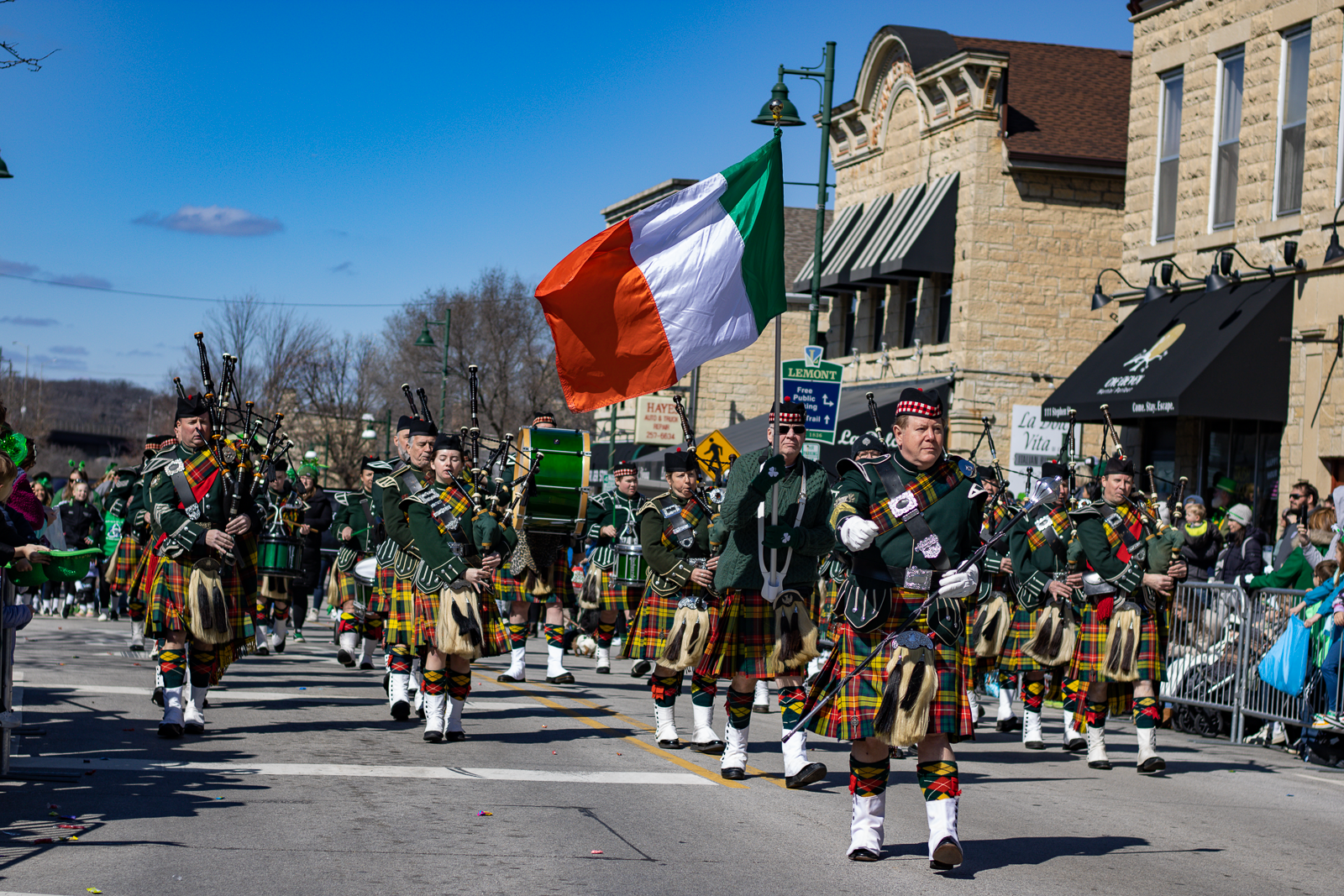
- Chicago Stock Yard Kilty Band marching in Lemont, Illinois, 2024

Background information
- Origin: Chicago, Illinois, U.S.
- Years active: 1921–present
- Website: sykb.com

The Chicago Stock Yard Kilty Band (SYKB) is a pipe band based in Chicago, founded in 1921. It is one of the oldest continuously operating pipe bands in the United States and has maintained affiliation with the American Legion since 1926. The band was founded by Scottish immigrant brothers Robert H. Sim and James S. Sim, both veterans of World War I who had served with the Gordon Highlanders. It has deep historical ties to the Union Stock Yards on Chicago's South Side and has served as the opening unit of the South Side Irish Parade since 1981. The band is a member of the Midwest Pipe Band Association and competes in Grades 4 and 5.

== History ==
=== Founding and early years (1921–1926) ===
The band traces its origins to late 1921, when Scottish immigrant brothers Robert H. Sim and James S. Sim attended the International Livestock Exposition at the Union Stock Yards in Chicago. According to band legend, after hearing a bagpiper perform at the event, Robert Sim remarked that they could do better, and the brothers set about organizing their own ensemble.

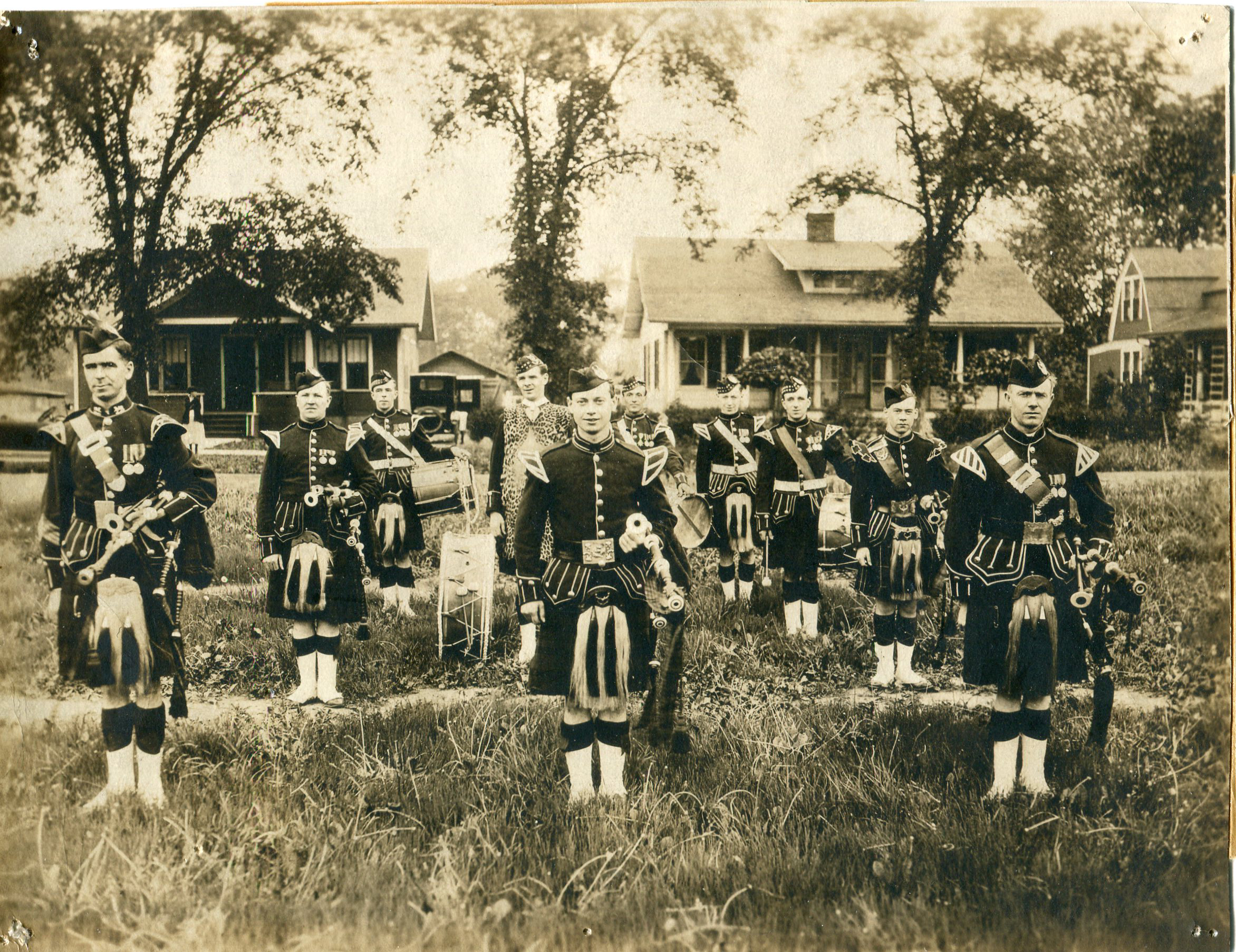
Early members of the band, then known as the British Legion Pipe Band, Harvey, Illinois, 1923

Robert Hepburn Sim was born in Aberdeen, Scotland, and served as pipe major of the 4th Battalion, Gordon Highlanders from 1912 to 1918, being wounded in France during World War I. His younger brother James Shepherd Sim also served with the Gordon Highlanders during the war. The brothers immigrated to the United States in 1921 and settled on Chicago's South Side.

Organized initially as the British Legion Band, the ensemble made its first public appearance on May 30, 1922, performing in Chicago's Memorial Day parade down Michigan Avenue as the British Legion Pipe Band. A contemporaneous account in the Chicago Tribune noted that the bagpipes played by members of the British Legion added a distinctive presence to the procession.

During this period, the band was also known informally as the Chicago Highlanders, a name reflecting its Scottish military heritage. Members acquired uniforms from former servicemen of the Gordon Highlanders and adopted the Gordon tartan, which the band wore through the early 1930s.

=== American Legion affiliation and the Stock Yards era (1926–1934) ===
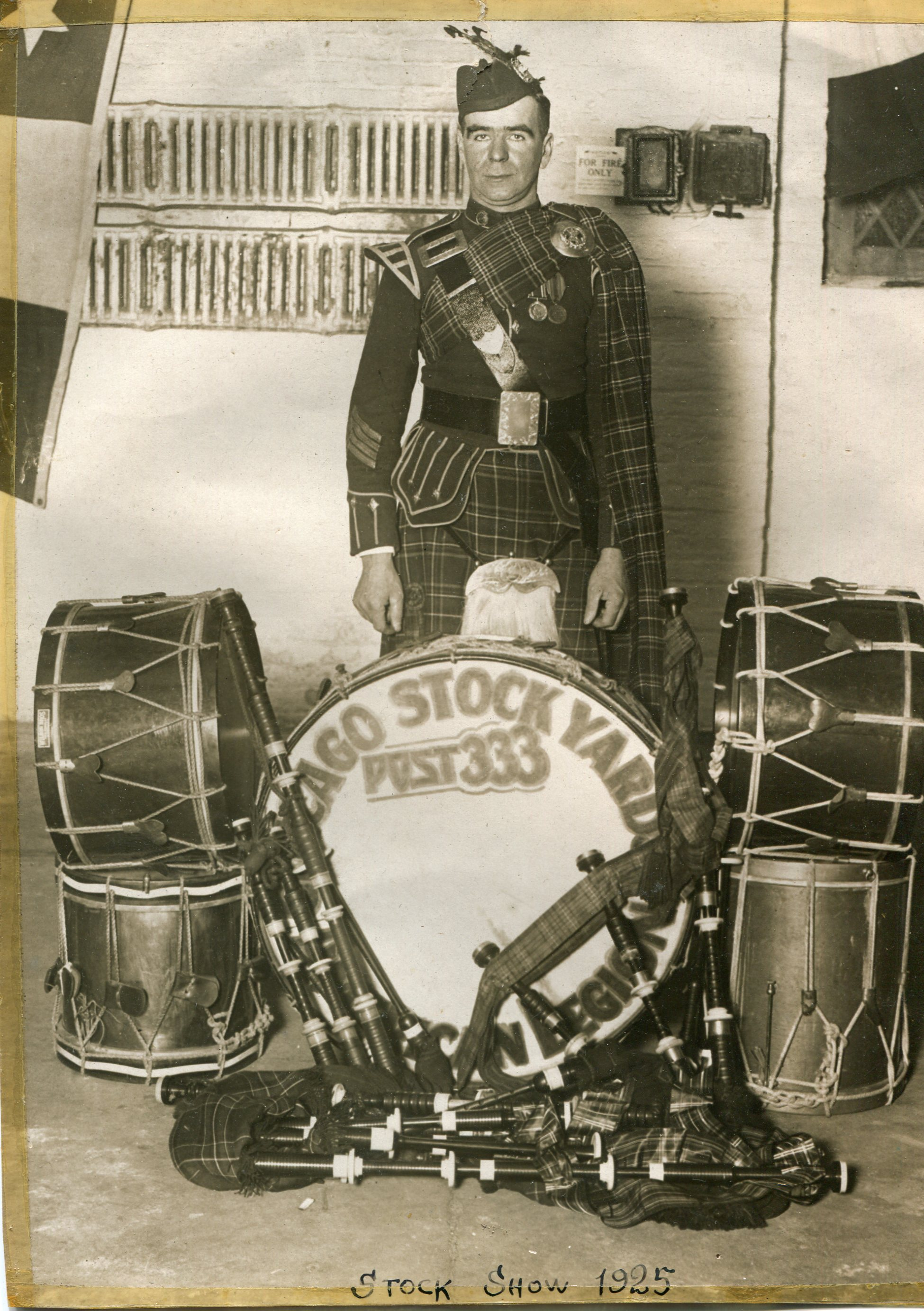
Chicago Stock Yard Kilty Band at the International Livestock Exposition, Chicago, 1925.

In 1926, the band became the official musical unit of Stock Yard American Legion Post No. 333, whose hall was located at the Stock Yard Inn at Exchange Avenue and Halsted Street. This affiliation made the Chicago Stock Yard Kilty Band among the earliest pipe bands associated with the American Legion. The band was provided with a dedicated rehearsal space in the old Boys and Girls Club building adjacent to the Stock Yard Inn, and its annual fall celebration, the Tartan Ball, was held in the Inn's ornate Saddle and Sirloin Ballroom. The band also served as the official band of the Illinois St. Andrew Society.

The band deepened its ties to the Union Stock Yards community throughout the late 1920s, performing regularly at the International Livestock Exposition's annual Cattle Parade as well as at American Legion conventions, charitable events, and civic celebrations across the Chicago region.

In the 1930s, a faction of members departed to form a separate organization, taking with them the Chicago Highlanders name that the band had used informally in its early years. Both organizations continued to operate, and the Chicago Highlanders Pipes and Drums remains active today

=== The 1934 fire and rebuilding ===
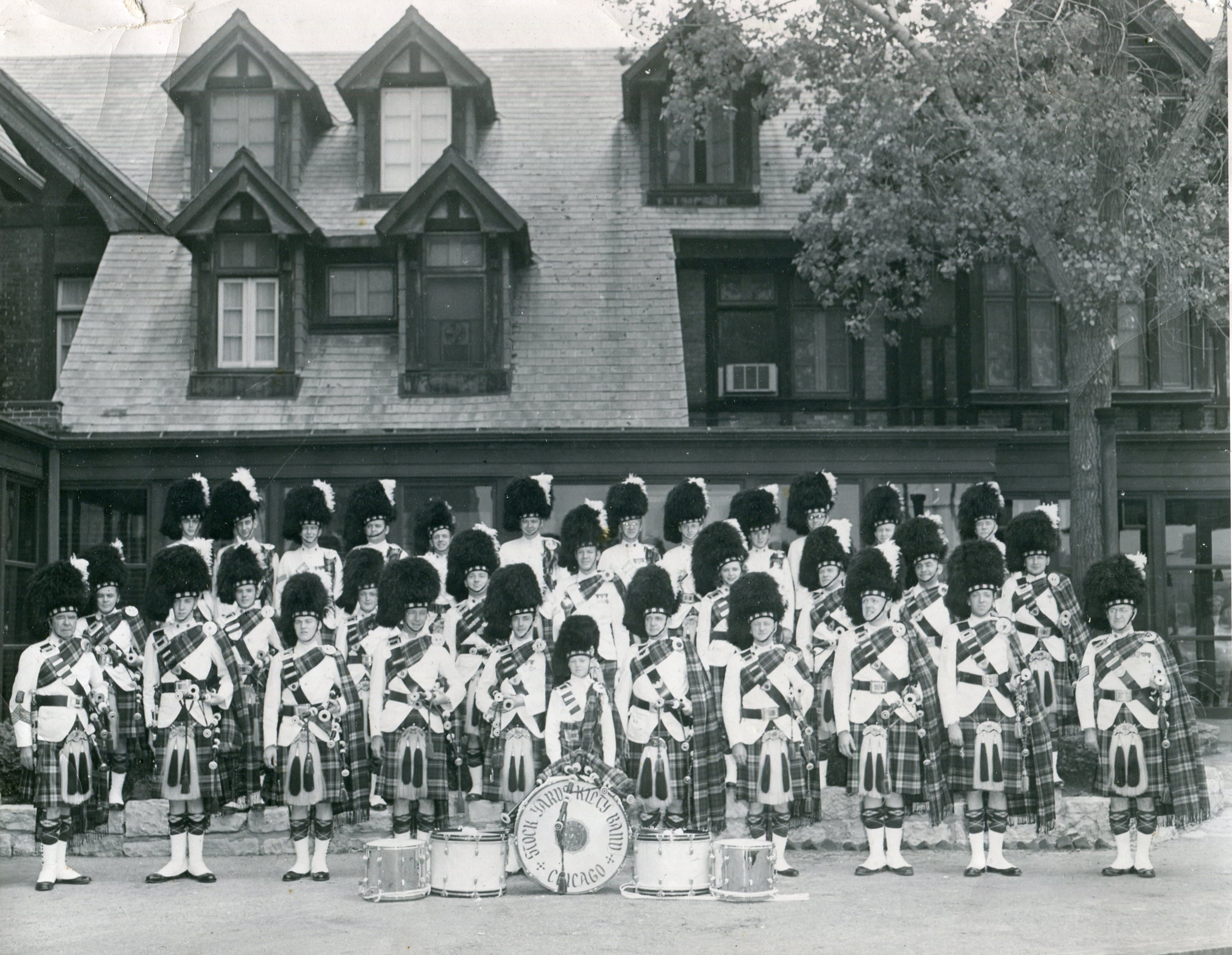
The SYKB at the Stock Yard Inn, Chicago, c. 1930s.

On May 19, 1934, a fire swept through the Union Stock Yards, destroying the Post 333 clubhouse along with the band's instruments, uniforms, and equipment. The American Legion Monthly reported that the blaze consumed "the equipment and uniforms of the outfit's sixty-piece kilty band." The band regrouped after the fire, selecting the Buchanan Modern tartan as their new kilt, a tartan the band continues to wear today.

Through the remainder of the 1930s, the band continued to perform at Legion events, civic occasions, and cultural celebrations, including appearances in 1933 at the Century of Progress World's Fair in Chicago.

=== Robert Sim era (1934–1963) ===
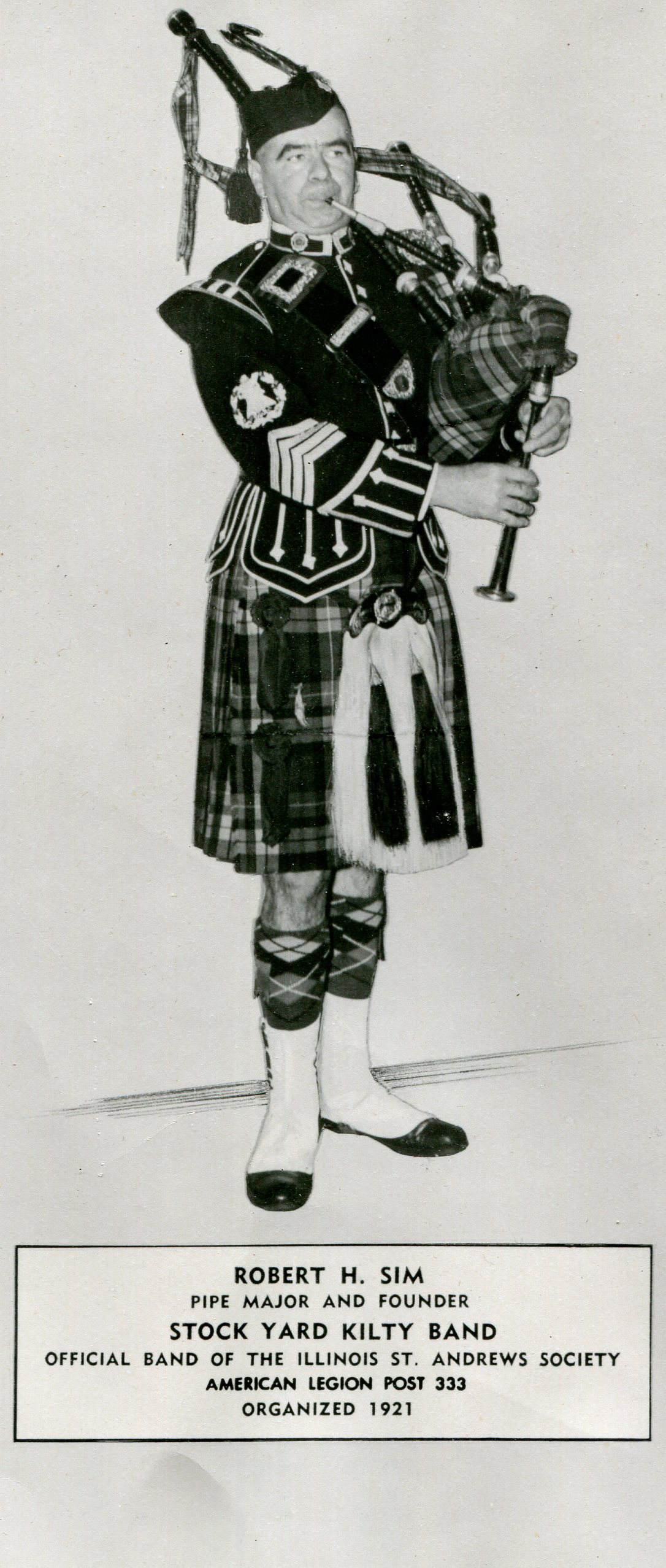

Under Robert Sim's continued leadership through the 1930s and 1940s, the band navigated the challenges of World War II, during which many members left to serve in the military. Sim expanded the band's membership during this period by opening recruitment beyond its original base of Scottish immigrants and veterans, admitting the band's first female member shortly thereafter.

The band celebrated its 25th anniversary in 1946, with many war veterans returning. In 1948, the band traveled to Canada to compete against Canadian bagpipers, their first attempt at competition.

Through the 1950s the band maintained a high public profile in Chicago. Notable engagements included performing along Michigan Avenue during Queen Elizabeth II's visit to Chicago in 1959. In 1960, the band performed at the hotel hosting John F. Kennedy during the Chicago presidential debate.

Robert H. Sim died on October 4, 1963, at the age of 68. He had served as the band's pipe major for the better part of four decades and taught the art of bagpiping to scores of students over his tenure. His brother and co-founder, James S. Sim, who had served as the band's first drum sergeant, died on July 9, 1966.

=== Transition era (1963–1975) ===
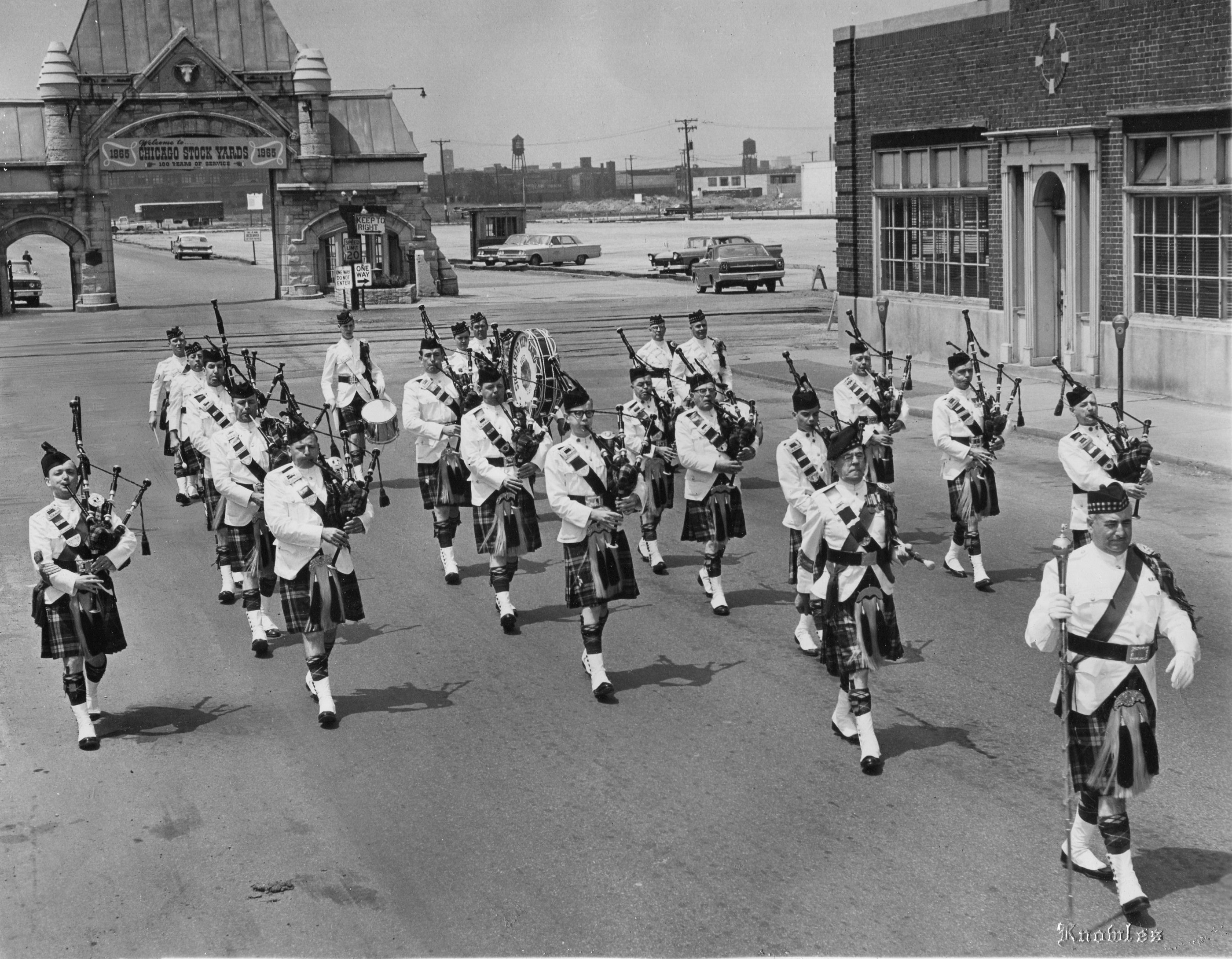
SYKB marching past the Union Stock Yards gate during the 1965 centennial

Following Robert Sim's death, leadership of the band passed through a series of pipe majors during a transitional period. Roderick MacDonald served as pipe major before being succeeded by Norman MacLeod. MacLeod, originally from Glasgow, had previously served as pipe sergeant in the Queen's Own Cameron Highlanders of Canada before immigrating to Chicago.

During this period, the Union Stock Yards, which had operated continuously since 1865, began a period of decline that culminated in their closure on July 30, 1971. The band, which had rehearsed and performed at the Stock Yard Inn for nearly five decades, relocated its operations to the south suburbs. By the 1980s, it had established an affiliation with American Legion Post 854 in Evergreen Park, Illinois, where it continues to rehearse and operate.

In 1975, a group of members focused on competitive piping departed to establish the Midlothian Scottish Pipe Band, reflecting a growing interest in formal pipe band competition.

=== The McKee era (1975–2003) ===
David E. McKee became pipe major following MacLeod's tenure, inaugurating a period of sustained growth and renewal that would define the band for the next three decades. McKee, born in 1928, had grown up on Chicago's South Side and first encountered the band as a young man after seeing it perform in a parade. He joined in 1950, left to serve in the military during the Korean War, and returned to become one of the band's most influential figures.

McKee's approach to leadership centered on instruction. He taught piping every Tuesday evening at his home in Beverly on Chicago's South Side, charging modest fees and accepting students regardless of age or prior musical experience. His philosophy emphasized musical expression over technical formality. "Play it from the heart, laddie" was his teaching maxim, as recorded by his colleague and fellow band member William Currie. Under his guidance the band attracted students from across the South Side and suburbs, many of whom went on to become long-term members.

The band's recovery and growth under McKee was documented in a 1980 Chicago Tribune feature, which described his teaching program and noted that his nephew Brian McKee had joined after only six months of lessons. By the mid-1990s the band had fully reestablished itself as a prominent fixture in Chicago's cultural life. A 1996 Tribune profile described the band as performing for "presidents and kings, queens and prime ministers" over its history and noted that its members had come to represent "pipers of all nationalities."

During this period, the band also became closely associated with the South Side Irish Parade, a community event first organized by the "Wee Folks of Washtenaw and Talman" in 1979. When the parade relocated to Western Avenue in Beverly and Morgan Park in 1981, the band joined as its opening unit and has served in that role since. This involvement reflected the band's deep roots on Chicago's South Side and its connection to neighborhood traditions that developed alongside its musical growth.

Under McKee's tenure, the band also achieved international competitive recognition, winning the best overseas band trophy at the Bridge of Allan Highland Games in Scotland.

David E. McKee retired as pipe major in 2003 and died on August 22, 2013. His obituary in the Chicago Tribune described him as having led an award-winning band and noted his 32-year career at Anheuser-Busch in addition to his decades of service to the SYKB.

=== Contemporary period (2003–present) ===
Matt McKee, son of David E. McKee, became pipe major in 2003, continuing a family tradition of leadership that now spans multiple generations. Under his direction the band has maintained its dual identity as both a performance ensemble and a competitive pipe band, entering Grades 4 and 5 competition through the Midwest Pipe Band Association.

The band has continued to draw members from South Side families across multiple generations, reflecting the community ties that have characterized it since its founding. In 2019, a WTTW News feature described the band as offering lessons from the McKee family home in Beverly, continuing the teaching tradition established by Dave McKee Sr. nearly half a century earlier.

The band celebrated its 100th anniversary in 2021. In a Chicago Tribune centennial feature, band historian Dan O'Brien described it as "one of the last living relics of the stockyards", reflecting its longstanding ties to Chicago's Union Stock Yards and its role in preserving South Side cultural traditions. The band's annual Tartan Ball marked the occasion, the 100th installment of a celebration that dates to the band's founding year.

In 2026, the band marks its 105th anniversary and the 100th anniversary of its affiliation with the American Legion.

== Uniform ==
The band's uniform has changed over time, reflecting two distinct periods in its history. In its early years, the band wore the Gordon tartan, a direct reference to founder Robert H. Sim's service with the Gordon Highlanders during World War I. Following the 1934 Union Stock Yards fire, which destroyed the band's uniforms along with its instruments and equipment, the band adopted the Buchanan Modern tartan, which has remained in use since.

The band utilizes multiple uniform configurations. For major parades and formal appearances, members wear a military-style uniform featuring a Buchanan Modern tartan kilt, green tunic, and traditional Highland dress elements such as a sporran, hose and flashes. A lighter summer variation is used in warmer weather. The civilian-style uniform, incorporating a shirt and tie, waistcoat, and glengarry cap, is worn for competition, social events, and private functions.

== American Legion affiliation ==
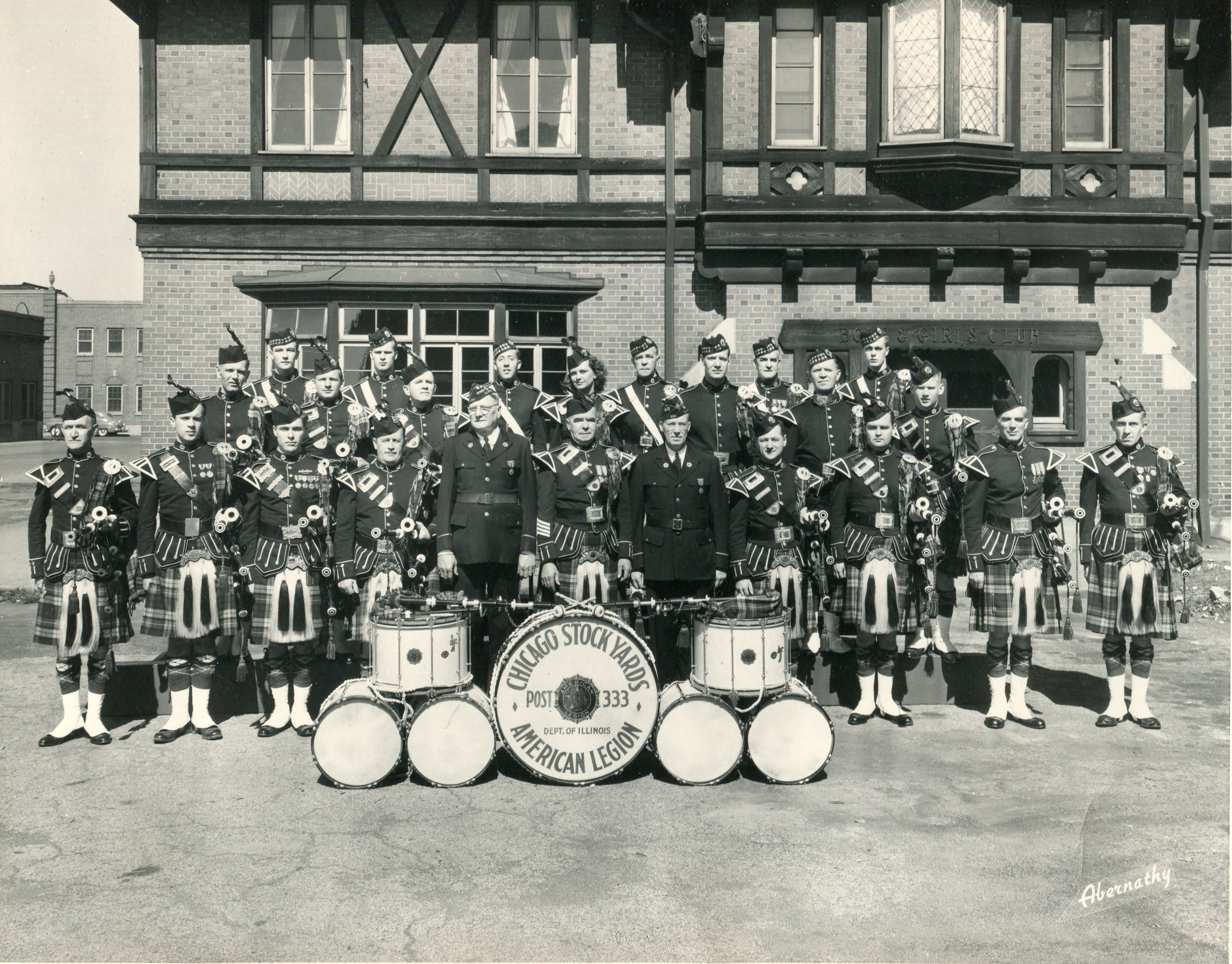
Outside the Boys and Girls Club at the Union Stock Yards, 1948

The Chicago Stock Yard Kilty Band has maintained an affiliation with the American Legion since 1926, when it became the musical unit of Stock Yards Post No. 333, an affiliation that made it among the earliest pipe bands associated with the American Legion. Following the closure of the Union Stock Yards and the dissolution of Post 333 in the mid-1970s, the band established its current affiliation with American Legion Post 854 in Evergreen Park, Illinois, where it continues to rehearse and represent the post at parades, ceremonies, and public events. The band's 2026 season marks the centennial of its American Legion affiliation.

== Tartan Ball ==
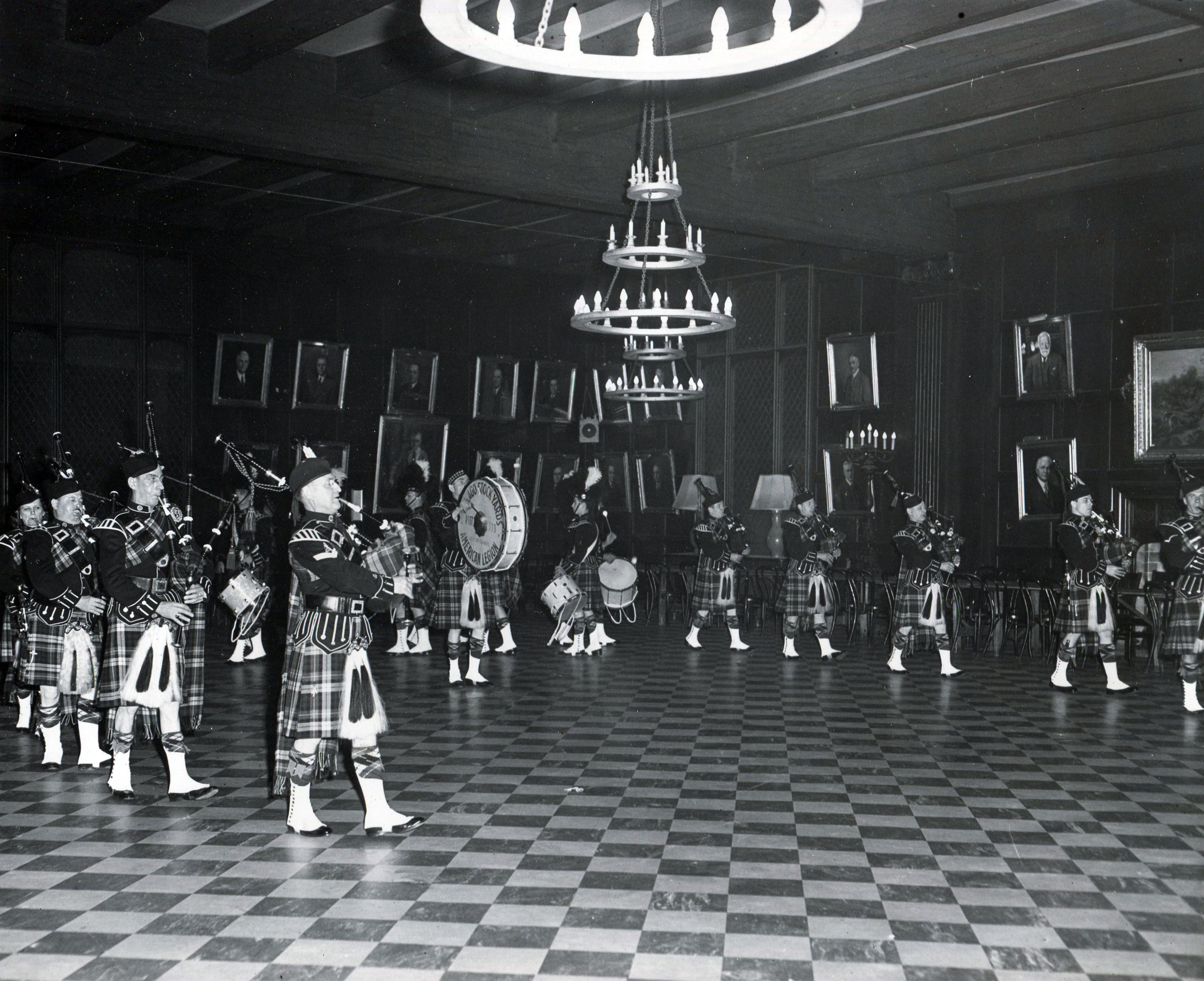
Saddle and Sirloin Ballroom

The band's annual Tartan Ball is a long-running celebration of Scottish music, Highland dance, and community that dates to its founding in 1921. In its early decades, when the band was composed largely of Scottish immigrants and their families, the event was held at the Saddle and Sirloin Ballroom of the Stock Yards Inn at Halsted and Exchange Streets, where it became an annual fixture of Chicago's Scottish cultural life.

Following the closure of the Union Stock Yards and the Stock Yard Inn in the 1970s, the Tartan Ball relocated to American Legion Post 854 in Evergreen Park, Illinois, where it is now regularly held. The event continues to serve as both a celebration of the band's history and a fundraiser supporting its operations.

== See also ==
- Union Stock Yards
- Gordon Highlanders
- American Legion
