= Suzanne Birnbaum =

French survivor of Auschwitz (1903–1975)

- Born: 15 July 1903; Paris, France
- Died: 22 November 1975 (aged 72); Nantes, France
- Known for: holocaust survivor
- Notable work: Une Française Juive est revenue [A Jewish Frenchwoman returned]

Suzanne Birnbaum (15 July 1903 – 22 November 1975), was born in the 5th arrondissement of Paris, and died in Nantes. She was a French Jewish woman, a shopkeeper in Paris and a survivor of deportation to Auschwitz during the Second World War. She is known for having written an autobiographical account of her arrest and deportation from Drancy to Auschwitz.

== Biography ==
In 1944, Suzanne Birnbaum ran a haberdashery in Paris on Rue de Chazelles, under the name of her companion, breaking the law because Jews were no longer allowed to own businesses. In January 1944, she was arrested, probably on denunciation, taken to Drancy and deported on 20 January 1944 to Auschwitz-Birkenau in Convoy n° 66 January 1944. She was assigned to the swamp and stone commando, before being assigned to the potato commando, which allowed her to improve her condition by "organizing", i.e. pilfering and organizing the black market in the Nazi concentration camps.

== Publication ==
In 1945, after her repatriation to France, Suzanne Birnbaum published one of the first autobiographical accounts of an experience in a Nazi concentration camp, depicting her life in the camps of Auschwitz, Belsen and Raguhn. The book, entitled Une Française juive est revenue, was published in 1946 and reissued in 1989 and 2003. The story is repeated in the documentary by Emil Weiss, Auschwitz, premiers témoignages, broadcast on Arte in 2011, 2012 and 2014.

== See also ==
- Convoys of the deportation of Jews from France
- Drancy internment camp
