= Emil Weiss =

Czech illustrator, reporter and architect

- Born: August 14, 1896; Moravia, Austria-Hungary
- Died: January 6, 1965 (aged 68)
- Resting place: Mt. Pleasant Cemetery, Hawthorne, New York
- Occupations: Illustrator, reporter, architect
- Spouse: Karla Weiss
- Children: Jan V. White

Emil Weiss (August 14, 1896 – January 6, 1965) was a Czechoslovak illustrator, reporter, and architect.

== Life and career ==
Emil Weiss was born in Moravia, at that time part of Austria-Hungary, and trained as an architect in Vienna. He worked as a cartoonist for newspapers and as a commercial artist in Prague in the 1920s. His posters are on display at the Prague Museum of Applied Arts, where reproductions are on sale as posters and as miniatures on matchbox covers. Weiss also worked as an Art Deco architect.

Following Hitler's ascension to power, Weiss sought refuge in Britain in 1938, but was denied a working permit until 1939 when the Nazis invaded Czechoslovakia, when his status changed from visitor to refugee. His personal version of his European drawing style made it difficult to find work. Due to the difficulty of finding jobs, he accepted most offers, including making wartime propaganda posters, illustrations for Czech publications, and portrait sketches for The Daily Telegraph. He then met Rose Fyleman, author of children's books and poetry, who was doing a serial for the children's page of The Christian Science Monitor in Boston. He illustrated the weekly segments for her, who connected him to Saville Davis, then the Monitor's London correspondent. Later, Davis appointed Weiss as the Monitor's visual reporter. There, he covered international events such as the 1946 conference in Lancaster House where the United Nations was born. In 1948, he emigrated to the US and became the Monitor's artist-reporter covering national events and politicians both on assignment as well as freelance until his death in 1965.

His portrait gallery of some thousand drawings of international personalities is a historic microcosm of the mid-20th Century. Some drawings are straight reportage, some satirical, yet all expose his victims' singularity. Aside from his portraits, the Monitor published pages'-worth of his article-illustrations as well as sketches from his travels—many from Austria—for which the president of Austria, Adolf Schärf, awarded him their Golden Badge of Honor in 1964.

Illustrator of some 40 children's books (originals now in the Kerlan Collection of the University of Minnesota Library) he illustrated Harper & Row's young readers' edition of JFK's Profiles in Courage; Emily Neville's 1964 Newbery medal winner It's like this, cat, Harper & Row, 1963. He was author of My Studio Sketchbook, Marsland, London 1948; with Karla Weiss the children's cookbook Let's have a party, Bruce, London, 1946; as well as Slavische Märchen, Schweizer Druck und Verlagshaus, Zürich, 1952.

Weiss had a number of superstitions. He believed that if you pronounced the name of a medicine with a Latin accent, its effective strength increased. For lower back pain, he advised a sheet of red flannel folded in half and draping over it a string that wrapped around the waist. Any other color than red was useless, he claimed. Tucking it inside the pants would shield the wearer from "looking like a truck with a red flag waving behind." Fortunately, his wife, Karla, a trained pianist who graduated from the Prague Music Academy, was more practical. She enabled him to pursue his career as an artist.

Weiss and his wife had one son, Jan V. White, the preeminent magazine design consultant known for his book "Editing By Design," the first book on magazine design, one of many he published on that subject. Continuing in the family's design tradition, Jan V. White is the father of Alexander W. White, an educator, typographer, and author of The Elements of Graphic Design and several other books on typography and graphic design.

Emil Weiss is buried in Mt. Pleasant Cemetery, Hawthorne, New York.

== Illustrations ==
Lucerna cabaret and restaurant, Poster, 1925
