= Judgment Day (novel) =

Judgment Day is a 1935 novel by James T. Farrell. It is the third and longest installment of Farrell's trilogy based on the short, unhappy life of William "Studs" Lonigan.

== Plot ==
This novel begins in 1931, a few years after the conclusion of The Young Manhood of Studs Lonigan. At the close of that novel, an intoxicated Studs had been beaten up by old rival Weary Reilly, and left on a snow-covered sidewalk overnight. Studs contracted pneumonia that night and has been in ill-health ever since. Several of Studs' old friends have died due to venereal diseases or excessive drinking, and Weary Reilly is in prison for rape. Studs is beginning to sense his own weakness and his own mortality, and he continually makes vain promises to change his ways.

Studs' young brother Martin, now known as Husk, is very much like Studs was a decade earlier. He's a drinker and brawler who openly disrespects Studs, and he even inflicts a severe beating on his older brother.

Studs begins dating a sweet, innocent Catholic woman named Catherine Banahan. He seems to love her and asks her to marry him, but he remains obsessed by sexual thoughts, and he looks constantly for chances to cheat on her. Studs is incapable of being true to her, and he feels strong guilt about his lust and infidelity.

The Great Depression is wreaking havoc on Chicago. Studs' father's painting business is failing, and the family home may be repossessed by the bank. Studs' father hopes that Studs can provide the family with some financial support, not knowing that Studs has foolishly lost most of his savings after investing in a worthless stock in what was another vain attempt at getting rich and becoming a big shot.

Studs gets Catherine pregnant, and he desperately looks fiir a job. After job hunting all over the city on a rainy day, Studs contracts pneumonia again and dies after falling into a feverish coma.

== Themes ==
Judgment Day is the most overtly political of the Studs Lonigan novels. Earlier installments of the trilogy seemed to blame most of Studs' failures on a combination of Irish Catholic culture and Studs' own foolishness. Judgment Day concentrates on the devastation and suffering caused by the Great Depression, and it reflects Trotskyite author James T. Farrell's belief that capitalism is responsible for the travails of families like the Lonigans. The novel also demonstrates Farrell's frustration with working-class Irishmen. To Farrell, it seems obvious that a socialist revolution is needed, but blue collar Irish-Americans like the Lonigans denounce socialists as "Reds," foolishly blame the Jews for their plight, and openly yearn for an American equivalent of Benito Mussolini to come to power.
