= Jan V. White =

American graphic designer

- Born: April 6, 1928; Prague, Czech Republic
- Died: December 30, 2014 (aged 86)
- Occupation: Publication designer

Jan V. White (1928-2014) was an American designer, communication design consultant, and graphic design educator and writer.

Czech by birth, he was educated in England at Leighton Park School and held degrees in architecture from Cornell University and Columbia University School of Architecture, Planning and Preservation.

From 1951 to 1964 he worked on two of TIME's architectural magazines: Architectural Forum (1951–56) as associate art director, and House & Home (1956-1964) as art director. Since 1964 he has worked as a designer, design consultant, writer and teacher. He redesigned more than 200 publications on four continents, and influenced many more with his books and articles about design for print.

Initially focused on periodical design, in the mid-1980s White brought his analysis of the visual rhetoric of structure, white space and typographic hierarchy to bear on corporate publishing in a way that shared common ground with information design. As an educator 'his most valued contribution for people trying to learn how to design has been his articulation, in very clear and easy-to-follow language, what publication design is about; and his insistence that it is not a mystery, but a rational activity of manipulating the elements of a publication in order to achieve certain defined communication outcomes.' 'White was an early proponent of the idea of design as being more than "good looks".'

Author of more than a dozen books on editorial design including the 1974 landmark work, "Editing by Design" in which he first presented his original thesis that design is a clarifying tool rather than a decorative tool. "Editing by Design" is now in its fourth edition (co-authored by his son Alex W. White) and has been in continuous publication since 1974. In 2012, he dedicated several of his design books to the public domain.

He was the son of the illustrator and architect Emil Weiss, and the father of the designer, writer and educator Alex W White.

He was buried in New Canaan, Connecticut and was survived by his four sons and seven grandchildren.

== Published work ==
As author:

- Editing by Design: Word-and-Picture Communication for Editors and Designers, RR Bowker Company, 1974

(revised as Editing by Design", Second Edition", RR Bowker Company, 1982)
(revised as "Editing by Design: For Designers, Art Directors, and Editors--the Classic Guide to Winning Readers", Third Edition, Allworth Press, 2003)
(revised as "Editing by Design: The classic guide to word and picture communication for art directors, editors, designers, and students", Fourth Edition, Allworth Press, 2020)

- Designing covers, contents, flash forms, departments, editorials, openers, products for magazines, RR Bowker Company, 1976
- Graphic Idea Notebook: A Treasury of Solutions to Visual Problems, Watson-Guptill, 1980 (2nd edition 1991)

(revised as Graphic Idea Notebook: A Treasury of Solutions to Visual Problems, Allworth Press, 2004)

- On Graphics: Tips for Editors, Lawrence Ragan Communications, 1981
- Designing for Magazines: Common Problems, Realistic Solutions, RR Bowker Company, 1982
- Mastering Graphics : Design and Production Made Easy, RR Bowker Company, 1983
- Using Charts and Graphs, RR Bowker Company, 1984
- The Grid Book: A Guide to Page Planning, Letraset, 1987
- Graphic Design for the Electronic Age, Watson-Guptill, 1988
- Xerox Publishing Standards: A Manual of Style and Design, Xerox Press / Watson-Guptill, 1988
- Thoughts on Publication Design, JRS, 1989
- Graphic Idea Triggers
- Color for the Electronic Age, Watson-Guptill, 1990
- Great Pages: A Common-Sense Approach to Effective Desktop Design, Serif, 1991
- Color for Impact: How Color Can Get Your Message Across or Get in the Way, Strathmoor, 1997

As designer:

- The Place of the Arts in New Towns. A Report, Educational Facilities Laboratories, 1973
- Jeanne M. Davern (editor), Places for people: hotels, motels, restaurants, bars, clubs, community recreation facilities, camps, parks, plazas, playgrounds : examples of outstanding achievement / selected for publication by the editors of Architectural record, McGraw-Hill, 1976
