= William T. Murphy =

American politician (1899–1978)

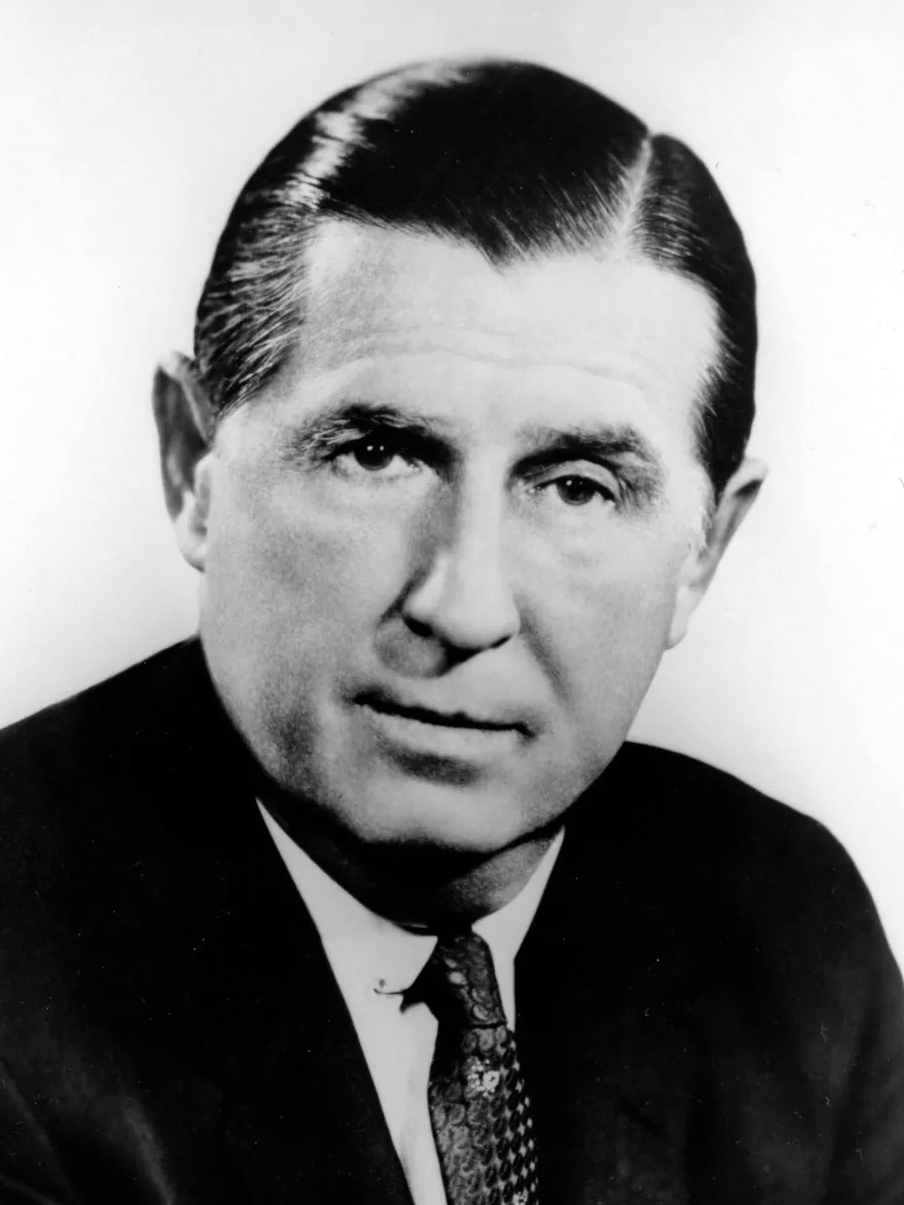

Member of the U.S. House of Representatives from Illinois's 3rd district
- In office January 3, 1959 – January 3, 1971
- Preceded by: Emmet Byrne
- Succeeded by: Morgan F. Murphy

Personal details
- Born: August 7, 1899 Chicago, Illinois, U.S.
- Died: January 29, 1978 (aged 78) Oak Lawn, Illinois, U.S.
- Party: Democratic

William Thomas Murphy (August 7, 1899 – January 29, 1978) of Chicago was a U.S. representative from the 3rd congressional district of Illinois. During his time in office, from 1959 to 1971, Murphy's district saw cultural and economic shifts with frequent civil rights marches and the closure of steel mills in the south of Chicago. In 1960, black minority residents made up just 20% of the population, but exceeded 40% by decade end.

Congressman Murphy joined civil rights leader Martin Luther King Jr in active support of open housing, culminating in passage of the 1968 Fair Housing Act.

He was a graduate of Loyola University Chicago. He was a Democrat. Moreover, Murphy served in the First World War and was a Chicago Alderman.

William Thomas Murphy died at the age of 78 due to cancer at Oak Park Hospital in Chicago.

U.S. House of Representatives
| Preceded by Emmet F. Byrne | Member of the U.S. House of Representatives from Illinois's 3rd congressional district 1959–1971 | Succeeded by Morgan F. Murphy |
