= James C. Murray =

American politician (1917-1999)

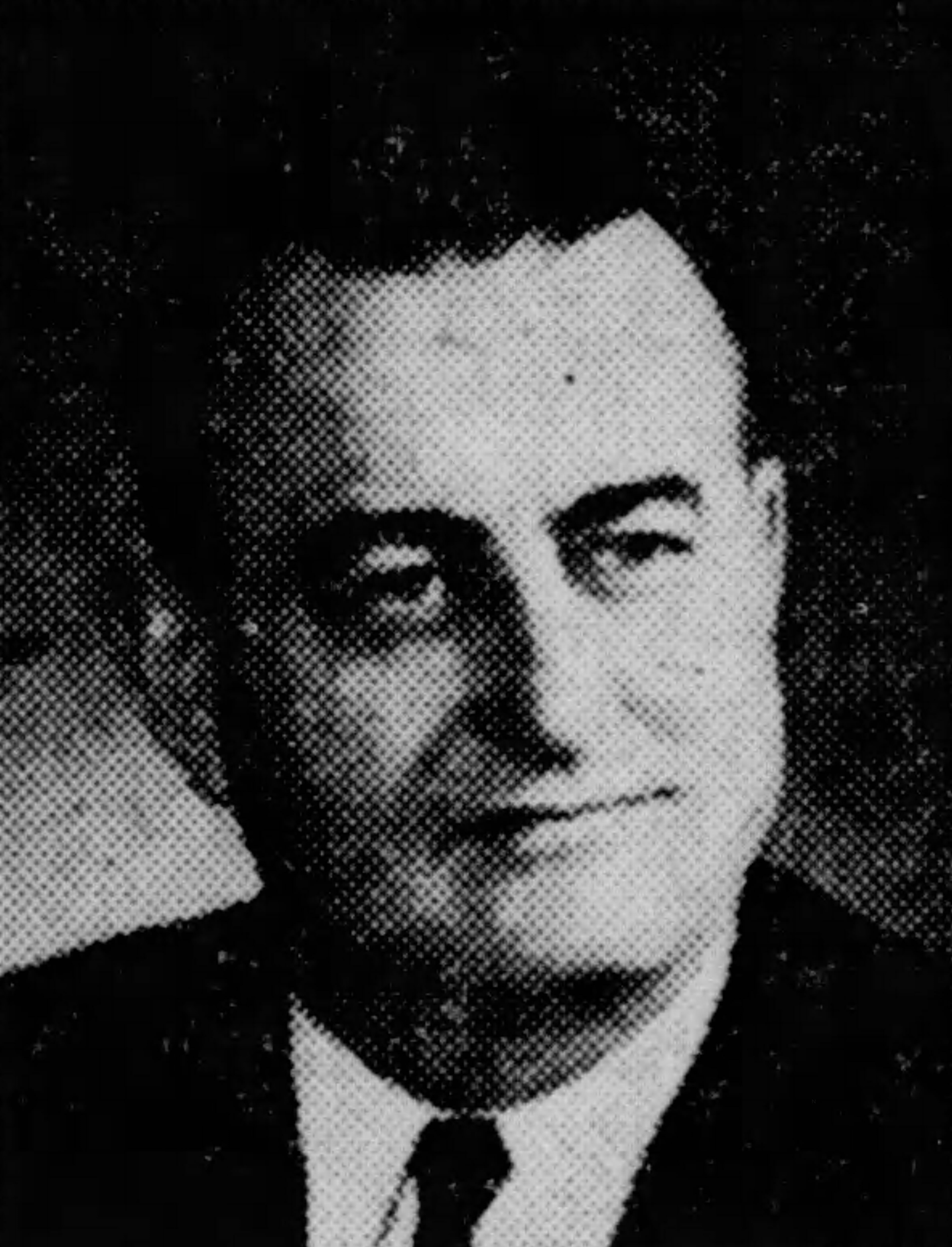

Member of the U.S. House of Representatives from Illinois's 3rd district
- In office January 3, 1955 – January 3, 1957
- Preceded by: Fred E. Busbey
- Succeeded by: Emmet Byrne

Personal details
- Born: May 16, 1917 Chicago, Illinois, U.S.
- Died: October 19, 1999 (aged 82) Oak Lawn, Illinois, U.S.
- Party: Democratic

James Cunningham Murray (May 16, 1917 – October 19, 1999) was a U.S. representative from Illinois from 1955 to 1957. He graduated from De Paul University Law School in 1940 and subsequently worked as a lawyer. He served in the United States Army Air Forces from 1942 to 1945.

== Biography ==
Born in Chicago, Illinois, Murray was elected to the Chicago City Council as 18th Ward alderman in 1959. He served eight years during which he was vice chair of the finance committee and president pro tempore. He sponsored the city's first fair housing law, which passed by four votes. Opposition to his fair housing activism resulted in his losing a 1966 judicial election, but he became a judge of the Cook County Circuit Court in 1970. In 1983, when the mayor of Chicago Harold Washington attempted to challenge an opposition bloc made of 29 aldermen, led by Edward Vrdolyak (a conflict that came to be known as the "Council Wars") it was Judge Murray who ruled that the "Vrdolyak 29" had acted legally and that Washington's motion to adjourn the council meeting was improper. Judge Murray was on the Appellate Court from 1986 until his retirement in 1994.

He was a member of the Illinois Supreme Court Committee to Recommend Rules of Evidence, the Judicial Conference Committee on Evidence, and the Committee on Complex Litigation.

U.S. House of Representatives
| Preceded by Fred E. Busbey | Member of the U.S. House of Representatives from Illinois's 3rd congressional district 1955–1957 | Succeeded by Emmet F. Byrne |
