= It's Like This, Cat =

1963 novel by Emily Cheney Neville

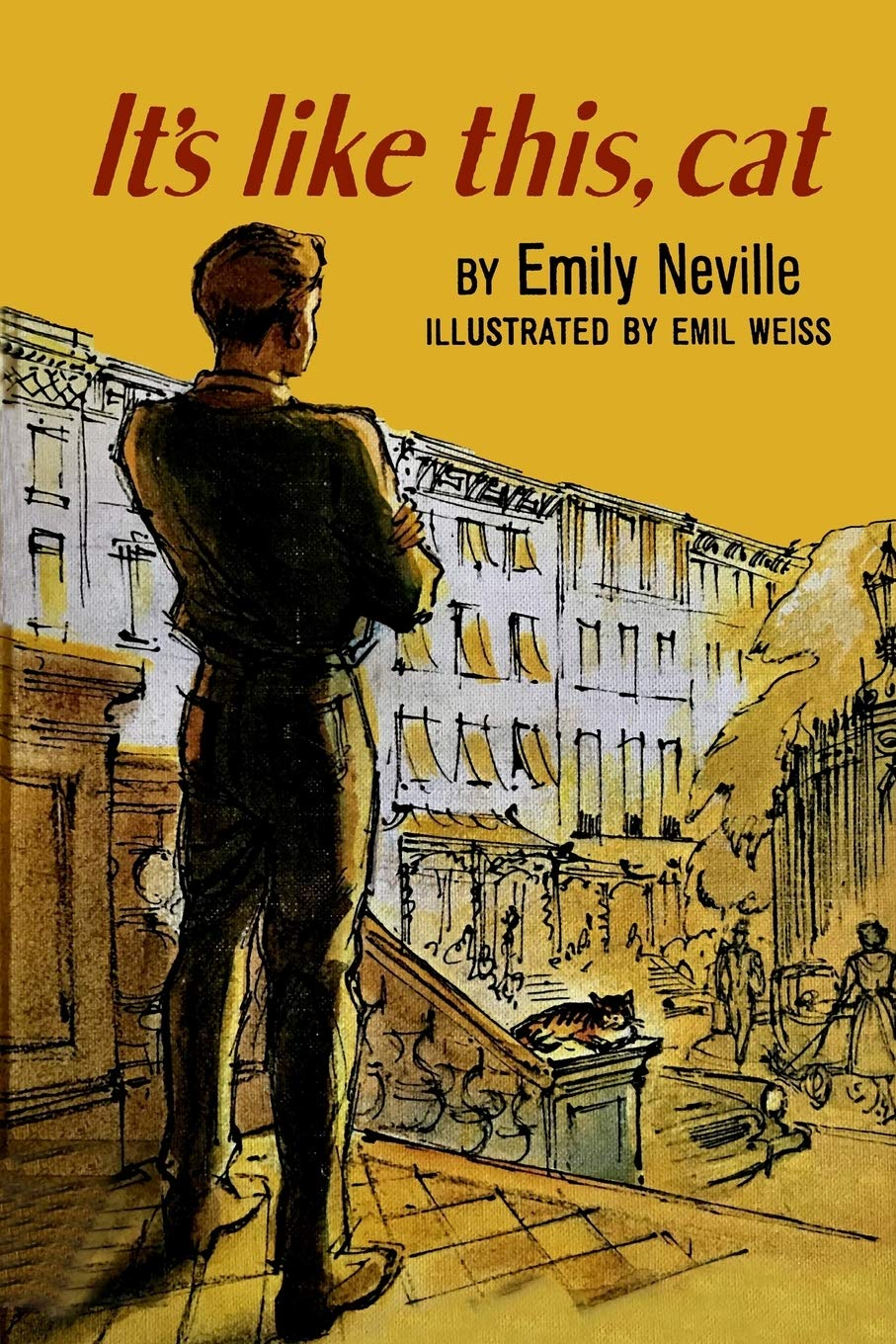
- Author: Emily Cheney Neville
- Illustrator: Emil Weiss
- Cover artist: Emil Weiss
- Language: English
- Genre: Children's novel
- Publisher: Harper & Row
- Publication date: 1963
- Publication place: United States
- Media type: Print (Hardback & Paperback)
- Pages: 181
- ISBN: 0-06-024390-2
- OCLC: 30857758

It's Like This, Cat is a novel by American writer Emily Cheney Neville, which won the Newbery Medal for excellence in American children's literature in 1964. It's Like This, Cat was Neville's first book.

== Plot summary ==
The main character of the story is Dave Mitchell, a 14-year-old boy who is growing up in mid-20th century New York City. Dave lives with his father and his asthmatic mother, whose attacks worsen when Dave and his father have their frequent arguments. Dave's refuge after a clash with his father is with Kate, an elderly neighbor whose apartment is filled with stray cats she loves. Dave adopts one of the stray cats, names it "Cat" and takes him home. "Cat" brings both joy and adventure into Dave's life.

Cat's presence brings Dave into contact with several new people, including a troubled college-aged boy named Tom, and Dave's first girlfriend, Mary. While documenting Dave's growing maturity, the book also provides glimpses of a few of New York's neighborhoods and attractions, from the Fulton Fish Market to the Bronx Zoo and Coney Island.

== Plot details ==
=== Cat and Kate ===
Dave is nearly hit by a car, and is saved by Kate, an older woman who takes him back to her apartment, which she shares with numerous rescued stray cats. Dave decides to take a male cat home with him as a pet, and names him Cat.

=== Cat and the Underworld ===
After a night of wandering, Cat gets locked in a storage cage in an apartment basement. An older boy skulking in the basement helps Dave break Cat out of the cage. Later, Dave makes an offhand remark to the superintendent of that apartment about the older boy, which leads the super to discover the basement has been robbed. Dave is initially concerned that he is a suspect and changes his appearance, but the older boy, Tom Ransom, 19, was caught trying to return the things he had stolen on a dare. Dave writes Tom a letter.

=== Cat and Coney ===
Dave and his best friend Nick decide to take Cat with them to the beach at Coney Island. There they meet three girls their age who use Cat as an excuse to meet the boys, including a quiet brunette named Mary who actually likes Cat.

=== Fight ===
Nick drags Dave against his will on a double date with two of the girls they met at the beach (but not Mary). Dave becomes resentful of Nick making fun of him to impress the girls, and after the date they get into a fistfight.

=== Around Manhattan ===
Tom comes to visit Dave, and they spend the day exploring the city.

=== And Brooklyn ===
Dave rides his bike to Brooklyn to find Tom working in a gas station. Later, Dave meets Tom at Coney Island, where he meets Tom's girlfriend Hilda. Hilda fills Dave in on Tom's getting kicked out of NYU and his father disowning him, which led up to his accepting the dare in the basement. Back at home, Dave asks his father, Pop, a lawyer, if he can do anything to help Tom, and his father agrees to talk to him.

=== Survival ===
Cat comes home seriously injured from a fight with another cat, and Dave has to make the difficult decision to have him neutered.

=== West Side Story ===
Dave bumps into Mary, the quiet brunette from his trip to Coney Island with Nick, at a record store. They go to a performance of West Side Story together, and make plans to meet up over Columbus Day.

=== Fathers ===
Tom follows Pop's advice to write his father and own up to his mistakes, and to ask for help. The letter is returned to sender, no forwarding address. Pop advises Tom to forget about his father, and Pop promises to help Tom get his life in order.

=== Cat and the Parkway ===
Pop has made some headway helping Tom get credit for his college classes, and he and Dave help Tom get a job at the local florist. Dave and his parents plan a vacation at a lake in the Connecticut countryside in August. The family is stuck in heavy traffic on the Hutchinson River Parkway, when Cat escapes through an open window. Pop just laughs. Dave rushes after Cat, with no way for his parents to turn around and pick him up. He walks the long way home, where his parents are waiting for him. After a brief fight, his father apologizes for laughing about Cat running, and they resume their vacation.

=== Rosh Hashanah at the Fulton Fish Market ===
Dave starts his first year of high school at Charles Evans Hughes High School. He does not know many other students at the school, but he recognizes a familiar face: Ben Alstein, a Jewish boy who lives near him. Dave and Ben become friends and spend the Rosh Hashanah school holiday exploring the city and visiting the Fulton Fish Market to get fish heads for Cat.

=== The Red Eft ===
Dave and Ben visit the Bronx Zoo and an adjacent park to research native animals for a biology project. There they catch two red efts, and on their way home view the ticker-tape parade for a test pilot. While they are working on their report in Dave's room, Cat kills one of the efts.

=== The Left Bank of Coney Island ===
Dave meets Mary on the Coney boardwalk on a cold Columbus Day. Mary takes him home and introduces him to her beatnik mother.

=== Expedition by Ferry ===
Dave and Mary continue their Columbus Day date together by riding their bikes to catch the Staten Island ferry. They have lunch at a delicatessen and visit the zoo.

=== Dollars and Cats ===
Tom and Kate join Dave and his parents for Thanksgiving dinner. Afterwards, Kate receives a telegram saying that her estranged, hermetic, wealthy brother has just died.

=== Fortune ===
The prospect of gaining her brother's fortune, and the media attention that ensues, overwhelm Kate. A kitten meets a grisly end under the foot of a careless news photographer, and Dave's family ends up adopting two of Kate's other kittens.

=== Telephone Numbers ===
Dave receives an unexpected phone call from Mary, who was shopping at Macy's and missed a rendezvous with her mother, and now does not have enough money to get back home. Dave brings her home for dinner. It is then that he realizes that she had looked up his number weeks before.

=== "Here's to Cat!" ===
Tom and Hilda arrive at Dave's house to announce they are getting married, and Tom has enlisted in the Army's Air Defense Command. They all make a toast to Cat.

== Characters ==
- Dave Mitchell: a 14-year-old boy living in Manhattan, New York in the early 1960s.
- "Aunt" Kate Carmichael: a middle-aged spinster who is distrustful of people and takes in stray cats.
- Cat: an orange male tabby cat Dave adopts from Kate.
- "Pop" Mitchell: Dave's father, a lawyer with a quick temper, prone to getting into shouting matches with Dave.
- Agnes "Mom" Mitchell: Dave's mother, a quiet woman prone to asthma attacks, especially when stressed by fights between Dave and Pop.
- Tom Ransom: a troubled 19-year-old boy whom Dave meets by chance.
- Nick: Dave's friend since early childhood.
- Mary: a quiet brunette who Dave meets at Coney Island, and who becomes his first girlfriend.
- Ben Alstein: a Jewish boy who Dave befriends in high school because he is one of the few familiar faces at his new school.
- Butch: the janitor of Dave's apartment building
- Fred Snood: the superintendent of Apartment 46, where Dave meets Tom for the first time.
- Hilda: Tom's girlfriend.
- Nina: Mary's beatnik mother.
- Kenny Wright: a boy who Dave meets while on vacation in Connecticut who teaches him how to skin dive.
- Joey: a tag-along younger boy who always got Dave and Nick in trouble with his older brother.
- Blonde: Mary's friend who Nick is interested in.
- Redhead: the Blonde's friend, she is Dave's date on the double date.

== Reception ==
Kirkus Reviews said of the book: "The author knows the language of a New York boy in the same sense that Mark Twain knew the talk of a Mississippi one, and like Mark Twain, she has such complete mastery of the technique that the reader is never aware of someone standing behind the boy." In a retrospective essay about the Newbery Medal-winning books from 1956 to 1965, librarian Carolyn Horovitz wrote: "The author's sensitive, intuitive knowledge of a young boy living in New York seems to be far greater than her ability to bring this into absolutely true focus."

Awards
Preceded by A Wrinkle in Time	Newbery Medal recipient 1964	Succeeded by Shadow of a Bull
