= Morgan F. Murphy =

American politician

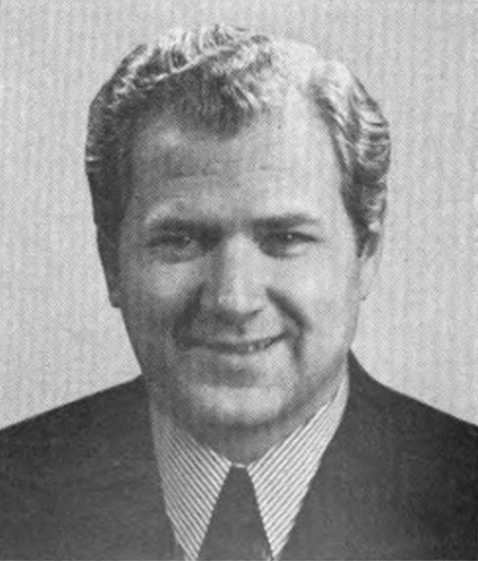

Member of the U.S. House of Representatives from Illinois
- In office January 3, 1971 – January 3, 1981
- Preceded by: William T. Murphy
- Succeeded by: Gus Savage
- Constituency: 3rd district (1971–73); 2nd district (1973–81)

Personal details
- Born: Morgan Francis Murphy; April 16, 1932 Chicago, Illinois, U.S.
- Died: March 4, 2016 (aged 83) Chicago, Illinois, U.S.
- Party: Democratic
- Education: Northwestern University; DePaul University
- Profession: lawyer

Military service
- Allegiance: United States
- Branch/service: United States Marine Corps
- Years of service: 1955–1957

Morgan Francis Murphy (April 16, 1932 – March 4, 2016) was an American attorney and United States Representative from Illinois.

== Education and career ==
Murphy attended Chicago parochial schools. He received a Bachelor of Science from Northwestern University in 1955 and was a member of the Sigma Chi fraternity. Murphy received a J.D. from DePaul University School of Law in 1962. He served in the United States Marine Corps from 1955 to 1957, including a one-year tour of duty in the Far East. He was an administrative assistant to the Clerk of the Circuit Court of Chicago from 1958 to 1961, was admitted to the Illinois bar in 1962, and commenced practice in Chicago. Murphy was special attorney, Board of Election Commissioners, for the 1964 at-large elections. He was an attorney for the Chicago Dairymen's Association during the 1968 milk strikes and a trustee-management representative of the Milk Wagon Drivers Union. He was hearing officer for the Local Liquor Control Commission, 1969–1970, and delegate to the Democratic National Conventions in 1968 and 1972. Murphy was elected as a Democrat to the Ninety-second and to the four succeeding Congresses (January 3, 1971 – January 3, 1981). Murphy was not a candidate for reelection in 1980 to the Ninety-seventh Congress and resumed the practice of law in Chicago.

Murphy partnered with union official John Serpico of Lincolnwood, Illinois in Studio Networks, Inc., a venture to purchase a building on Chicago's near west side and develop it as a film studio. Serpico was a former vice president of the Laborers' International Union of North America (LIUNA) as well as former president of the Central States Joint Board (CSJB), a labor organization made up of as many as eight local unions.

Murphy was a board member on the Cook County Zoning Board of Appeals from 2005 to 2014.

== Personal life ==
Murphy was a resident of Chicago; he died there on March 4, 2016, at the age of 83. Murphy's niece Mary Judith is married to former Illinois state senator Patrick O'Malley.

U.S. House of Representatives
Preceded by William T. Murphy	Member of the U.S. House of Representatives from Illinois's 3rd congressional district 1971–1973	Succeeded by Robert P. Hanrahan
Preceded by Abner J. Mikva	Member of the U.S. House of Representatives from Illinois's 2nd congressional district 1973–1981	Succeeded by Gus Savage
