= Emmet Byrne =

American politician (1896–1974)

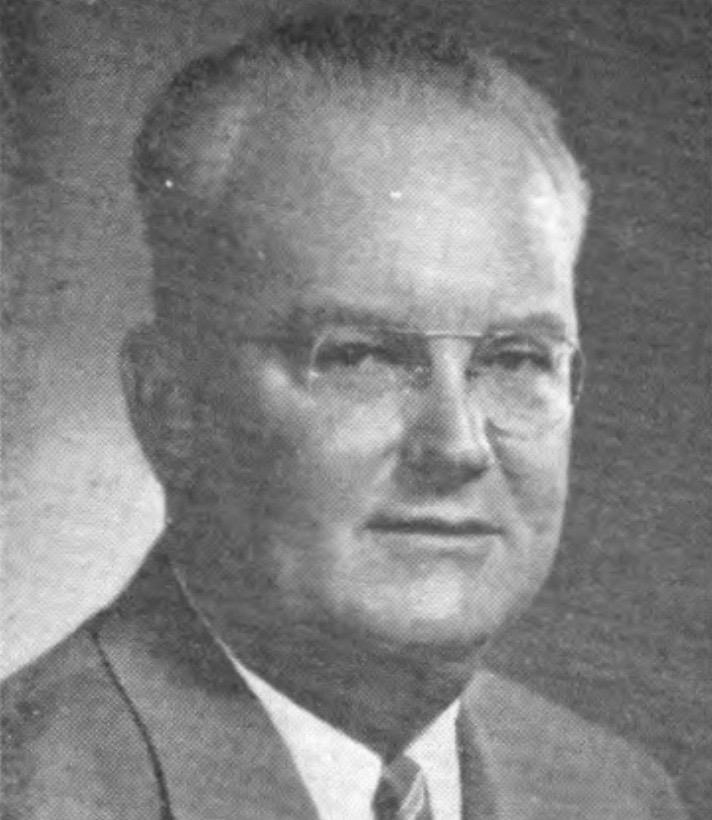

Member of the U.S. House of Representatives from Illinois's 3rd district
- In office January 3, 1957 – January 3, 1959
- Preceded by: James C. Murray
- Succeeded by: William T. Murphy

Personal details
- Born: December 6, 1896 Chicago, Illinois, U.S.
- Died: September 25, 1974 (aged 77) Evanston, Illinois, U.S.
- Party: Republican

Emmet Francis Byrne (December 6, 1896 – September 25, 1974) was an American politician. He was a U.S. representative from the third district of Illinois. He served one term, 1957–59, as a Republican before being defeated in the 1958 election by Democrat William T. Murphy. Byrne voted in favor of the Civil Rights Act of 1957.

== Biography ==
He was born in Chicago, Illinois on December 6, 1896. He was an alumnus of Loyola University Chicago and DePaul University College of Law. He died on September 25, 1974.

U.S. House of Representatives
Preceded by James C. Murray	Member of the U.S. House of Representatives from Illinois's 3rd congressional district 1957–1959	Succeeded by William T. Murphy
