= James T. Farrell =

American novelist (1904–1979)

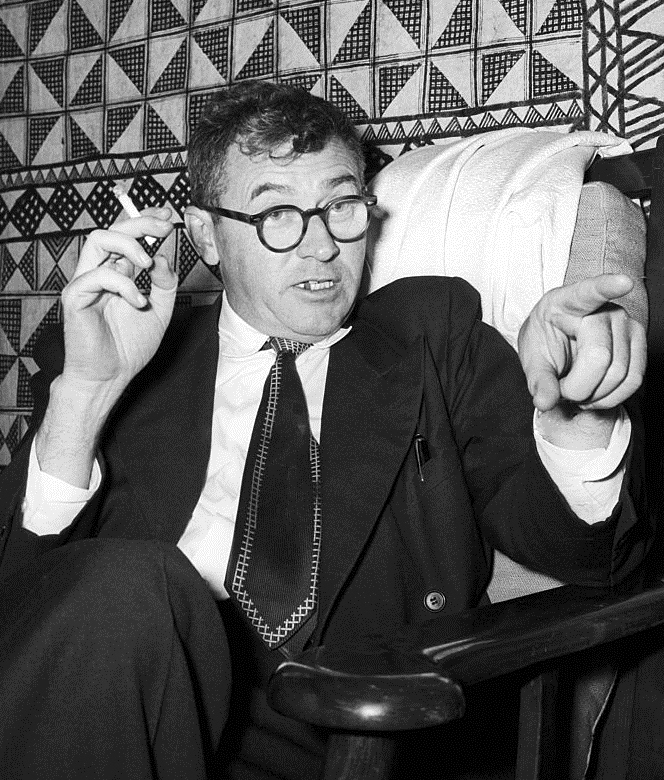
- James T. Farrell in the 1950s
- Born: James Thomas Farrell; February 27, 1904; Chicago, Illinois, U.S.
- Died: August 22, 1979 (aged 75); New York City, U.S.
- Resting place: Calvary Cemetery
- Writing career
- Notable work: Studs Lonigan
- Notable awards: Emerson-Thoreau Medal (1979)

James Thomas Farrell (February 27, 1904 – August 22, 1979) was an American novelist, short story writer and poet.

He is most remembered for the Studs Lonigan trilogy, which was made into a film in 1960 and a television series in 1979.

== Biography ==
Farrell was born in Chicago, to a large Irish-American family that included siblings Earl, Joseph, Helen, John and Mary. In addition, there were several other siblings who died during childbirth, as well as one who died from the 1918 flu pandemic. His father was a teamster, and his mother a domestic servant. His parents were too poor to provide for him, and he went to live with his grandparents when he was three years old.

Raised Catholic on the Chicago's South Side, Farrell attended St. Anselm Catholic School and Mt. Carmel High School then known as St. Cyril High School, with future Egyptologist Richard Anthony Parker. He then attended the University of Chicago.

He began writing when he was 21 years old. A novelist, journalist, and short story writer, he was known for his realistic descriptions of the working class South Side Irish, especially in the novels about the character Studs Lonigan. Farrell based his writing on his own experiences, particularly those that he included in his celebrated "Danny O'Neill Pentalogy" series of five novels.

Among the writers who acknowledged Farrell as an inspiration was Norman Mailer:

Mr. Mailer intended to major in aeronautical engineering, but by the time he was a sophomore, he had fallen in love with literature. He spent the summer reading and rereading James T. Farrell's "Studs Lonigan," John Steinbeck's "Grapes of Wrath" and John Dos Passos's "U.S.A.," and he began, or so he claimed, to set himself a daily quota of 3,000 words of his own, on the theory that this was the way to get bad writing out of his system. By 1941 he was sufficiently purged to win the Story magazine prize for best short story written by an undergraduate.

== Politics ==
Farrell was also active in Trotskyist politics and joined the Socialist Workers Party (SWP). He came to agree with Albert Goldman and Felix Morrows' criticism of the SWP and Fourth International management. With Goldman, he ended his participation with the group in 1946 to join the Workers' Party.

Within the Workers' Party, Goldman and Farrell worked closely. In 1948, they developed criticisms of its policies, claiming that the party should endorse the Marshall Plan and also Norman Thomas' presidential candidacy. Having come to believe that only capitalism could defeat Stalinism, they left to join the Socialist Party of America. During the late 1960s, disenchanted with the political "center", while impressed with the SWP's involvement in the Civil Rights and US anti-Vietnam War movements, he reestablished communication with his former comrades of two decades earlier. Farrell attended one or more SWP-sponsored Militant Forum events (probably in NYC), but never rejoined the Trotskyist movement.

In 1976, he became a founding member of the neoconservative Committee on the Present Danger.

== Personal life ==
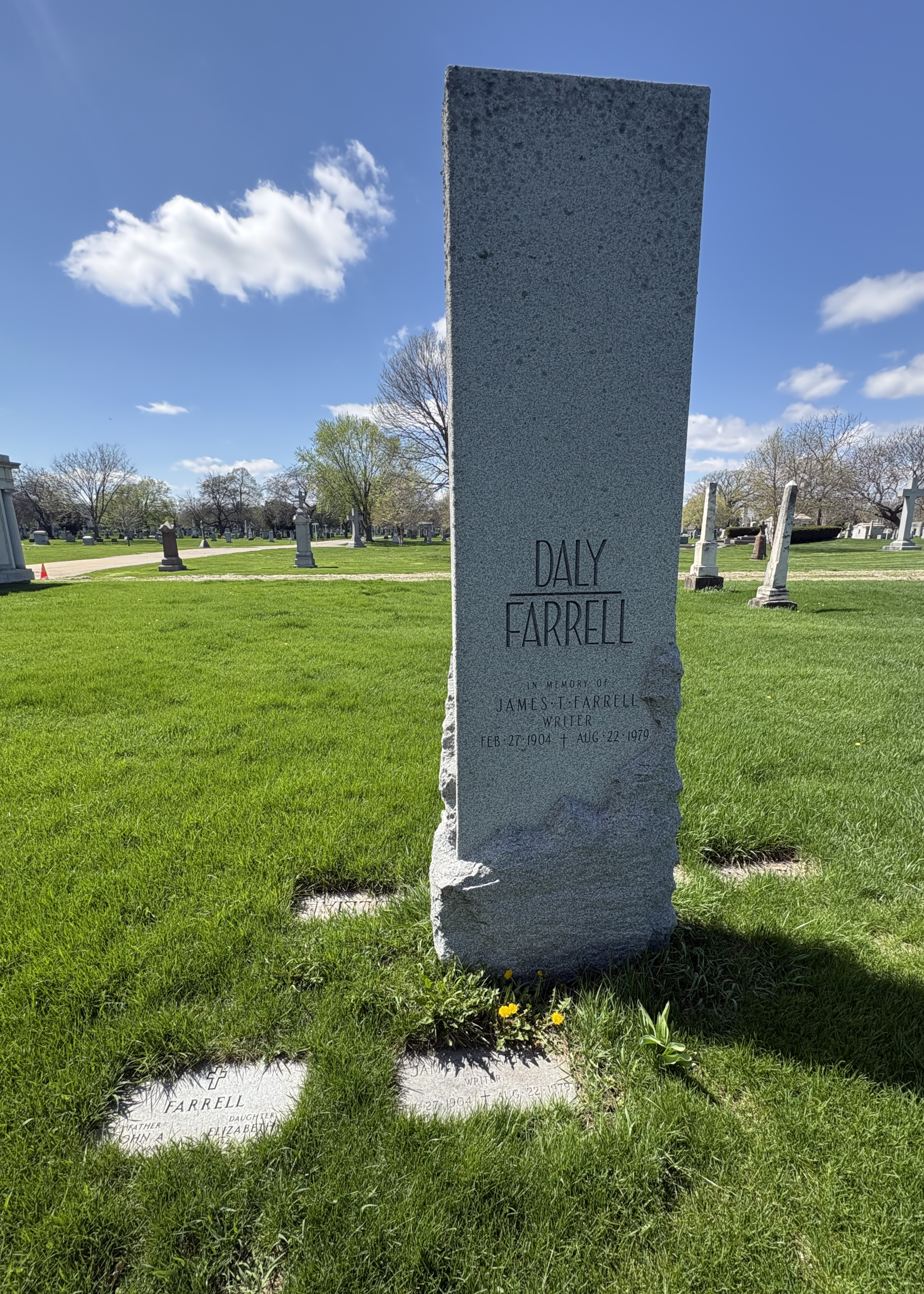
Farrell's grave at Calvary Cemetery

Farrell was married three times, to two women. He married his first wife Dorothy Butler in 1931. After divorcing her, in 1941 he married stage actress Hortense Alden, with whom he had two sons, Kevin and John. They divorced in 1955, and later that year he remarried Dorothy Farrell. They separated again in 1958 but remained legally married until his death. She died in 2005.

Farrell died at his home in Manhattan on August 22, 1979, and was buried at Calvary Cemetery in Evanston.

== Legacy ==
According to William McCann:

No writer has described a specific area of American society so thoroughly and comprehensively as Farrell did in the seven novels of Studs Lonigan and Danny O'Neill (1932-43). A consummate realist in viewpoint and method, he turned repeatedly in his fiction to the subject he knew best, the Irish Catholic neighborhood of Chicago's South Side. Drawing on lacerating personal experience, Farrell wrote about people who were victims of injurious social circumstances and of their own spiritual and intellectual shortcomings. He depicted human frustration, ignorance, cruelty, violence, and moral degeneration with sober, relentless veracity....Despite his Marxist leanings, Farrell's fiction is not that of a reformer, or a doctrinaire theorist, but rather the patient humorless representation of ways of life and states of mind he abhors....Farrell’s place in American letters, however, as certainly the most industrious and probably the most powerful writer in the naturalistic tradition stemming from Frank Norris and Dreiser, was solidly established with the Lonegan--O'Neil series....His later novels are lamented and ignored.

The Studs Lonigan trilogy was voted number 29 on the Modern Library's list of the 100 best novels of the 20th century.

On the 100th anniversary of Farrell's birth, Norman Mailer was a panelist at the New York Public Library's "James T. Farrell Centenary Celebration" on February 25, 2004, along with Pete Hamill, Arthur M. Schlesinger, Jr. and moderator Donald Yannella. They discussed Farrell's life and legacy.

In 1973, Farrell was awarded the St. Louis Literary Award from the Saint Louis University Library Associates. In 2012, he was inducted into the Chicago Literary Hall of Fame.

Studs Terkel, the Chicago-based historian, took the name "Studs" from Farrell's famous character Studs Lonigan.

== Bibliography ==
=== Novels ===
Studs Lonigan trilogy

- Young Lonigan (1932)
- The Young Manhood of Studs Lonigan (1934)
- Judgment Day (1935)

Danny O'Neill pentalogy

- A World I Never Made (1936)
- No Star Is Lost (1938)
- Father and Son (1940)
- My Days of Anger (1943)
- The Face of Time (1953)

Bernard Carr trilogy

- Bernard Clare (1946)
- The Road Between (1949)
- Yet Other Waters (1952)

Other novels

- Gas-House McGinty (1933)
- Ellen Rogers (1941)
- This Man and This Woman (1951)
- Boarding House Blues (1961)
- The Silence of History (1963)
- What Time Collects (1964)
- Lonely for the Future (1966)
- New Year's Eve/1929 (1967)
- A Brand New Life (1968)
- Invisible Swords (1971)
- The Dunne Family (1976)
- The Death of Nora Ryan (1978)
- Sam Holman (1994)
- Dreaming Baseball (2007)

=== Short fiction ===
- Calico Shoes and Other Stories (1934)
- Guillotine Party and Other Stories (1935)
- Can All This Grandeur Perish? and Other Stories (1937)
- $1000 a Week and Other Stories (1942)
- To Whom It May Concern and Other Stories (1944)
- When Boyhood Dreams Come True and Other Stories (1946)
- The Life Adventurous and Other Stories (1947)
- An American Dream Girl and Other Stories (1950)
- French Girls Are Vicious and Other Stories (1955)
- An Omnibus of Short Stories (1956)
- A Dangerous Woman and Other Stories (1957)
- Side Street and Other Stories (1961)
- Sound of a City (1962)
- Childhood Is Not Forever (1969)
- Judith and Other Stories (1973)
- Olive and Mary Anne: Five Tales (1977)
- Eight Short, Short Stories (1981)

=== Other books ===
- A Note on Literary Criticism (1936)
- The League of Frightened Philistines and Other Papers (1945)
- Literature and Morality (1947)
- Truth and Myth About America (1949)
- The Name Is Fogarty: Private Papers on Public Matters (1950)
- Reflections at Fifty and Other Essays (1954)
- My Baseball Diary (1957)
- It Has Come To Pass (1958)
- Selected Essays (1964)
- The Collected Poems of James T. Farrell (1965)
- When Time Was Born (1966)
- Literary Essays 1954-1974 (1976)
- Hearing Out James T. Farrell: Selected Lectures (1997)
