= Studs Lonigan =

Novel trilogy by James T. Farrell

Studs Lonigan is a novel trilogy by American author James T. Farrell: Young Lonigan (1932), The Young Manhood of Studs Lonigan (1934), and Judgment Day (1935). In 1998, the Modern Library ranked the Studs Lonigan trilogy 29th on its list of the 100 best English-language novels of the 20th century.

The trilogy was adapted into a minor 1960 film and a 1979 television miniseries, both of which were titled Studs Lonigan.

== Themes ==
Farrell wrote these three novels at a time of national despair. During the Great Depression, many of America's most talented writers and artists aimed to create a singular, impactful work of art that would thoroughly reveal the injustices of capitalism and inspire a political and economic transformation of the American system.

Farrell chose to use his own personal knowledge of Irish-American life on the South Side of Chicago to create a portrait of an average American slowly destroyed by the "spiritual poverty" of his environment. Both Chicago and the Catholic Church of that era are described at length and faulted. Farrell describes Studs sympathetically as Studs slowly deteriorates, changing from a tough but fundamentally good-hearted, adventurous teenage boy to an embittered, physically shattered alcoholic.

== Film ==
Parts of Farrell's novels were made into a movie in 1960, directed by Irving Lerner and starring Christopher Knight in the title role. Other cast members included Frank Gorshin, Venetia Stevenson, and Jack Nicholson (in one of his first movie roles).

== Television ==
In 1979, Studs Lonigan was produced as a television miniseries starring Harry Hamlin, Colleen Dewhurst, Brad Dourif, Dan Shor, and Charles Durning. Production Designer Jan Scott won an Emmy Award for Outstanding Art Direction for a Limited Series or a Special. Reginald Rose wrote the adaptation of the trilogy. The miniseries retains the novel's tragic conclusion while significantly humanizing Studs Lonigan's family and friends.

== Other ==
The entire miniseries is housed at the University of Georgia's Peabody Collection. The university has made the series available online by using the keyword "Studs Lonigan" in the search box.

== Reception and legacy ==
According to William McCann:

No writer has described a specific area of American society so thoroughly and comprehensively as Farrell did in the seven novels of Studs Lonigan and Danny O'Neill (1932-43). A consummate realist in viewpoint and method, he turned repeatedly in his fiction to the subject he knew best, the Irish Catholic neighborhood of Chicago's South Side. Drawing from harsh personal experience, Farrell wrote about individuals who suffered both from harmful social conditions and their own spiritual and intellectual flaws. He depicted human frustration, ignorance, cruelty, violence, and moral degeneration with sober, relentless veracity....Despite his Marxist leanings, Farrell's fiction is not that of a reformer, or a doctrinaire theorist, but rather the patient, humorless representation of ways of life and states of mind he abhors….Farrell’s place in American letters, however, as certainly the most industrious and probably the most powerful writer in the naturalistic tradition stemming from Frank Norris and Dreiser, was solidly established with the Lonegan--O'Neil series.
