= Young Lonigan =

1932 novel by James T. Farrell

Young Lonigan: A Boyhood in Chicago Streets
- Author: James T. Farrell
- Language: English
- Series: William "Studs" Lonigan
- Publisher: Vanguard Press
- Publication date: 1932
- Publication place: United States

Young Lonigan: A Boyhood in Chicago Streets is a 1932 novel by James T. Farrell. It is the first part of a trilogy about William "Studs" Lonigan, a young Irish-American growing up in Chicago.

== Plot ==
The story begins in 1916, as 14-year-old Studs is graduating from a Catholic elementary school. Studs is the eldest of Patrick and Mary Lonigan's four children. Patrick Lonigan, a genial undemanding father, is a successful painting contractor. He plans to send Studs to a prestigious Catholic high school, where he hopes his athletic son will become a football star. Studs' mother, on the other hand, wants desperately for her son to become a priest.

Studs seems to have a bright future in many ways: he is intelligent, popular, a good athlete, and an imaginative boy with a good heart. He is in love with classmate Lucy Scanlan, whom he dreams of constantly and spends some tender moments with.

Even at the age of 14, however, Studs demonstrates all the flaws that will ultimately ruin him and lead him to an early death. More than anything else, Studs wants to be perceived as a tough guy and a big shot. Winning and maintaining this image is so important to him that he will throw away his chance at an education, push away Lucy Scanlan, and destroy his health.

Studs genuinely loves Lucy Scanlan, but after spending a memorable, romantic afternoon in the park with her, he begins to shun her and avoid her. He imagines his stoic machismo will make him more appealing to her. Instead, he alienates her completely. But his self-image as a tough guy prevents him from reaching out to her and causes him to reject efforts by friends to reconcile them.

The high point of the novel, ultimately the high point of Studs' life, comes when Studs bests neighborhood bully "Weary" Reilly in a streetcorner fistfight. Though this was only a sloppy fight between two schoolboys, the fight takes on mythic proportions in Studs' mind and memories. For as long as he lives, Studs will remember this fight and remind people of it, as if it were his greatest accomplishment.

His victory over Weary Reilly elevates Studs in the eyes of the neighborhood's tough guys and thugs, whose respect Studs craves. He starts to shun his older friends, whom he now regards as "punks," and starts hanging out at the pool hall with a rougher crowd. Studs and his new gang spend their time smoking, seeking sexual conquests, and tormenting black or Jewish kids who stray into their turf. Studs, who had been looking forward to attending high school, starts mocking education and talking about dropping out of school entirely.

Athough Studs is still a boy at the end of the novel, it is clear that his life is heading in a dangerous direction.

== Controversy ==
The book contains numerous racial slurs that would have been typical of the working-class Irish Catholics living on Chicago's South Side during the period Farrell is depicting, 1915 to 1931, including offensive terms for Jews, African-Americans, Italians, and Eastern Europeans. Some 21st century readers have assumed these words reflect the author's own sentiments, even though Studs is an anti-hero, and one of the only sympathetic characters in the trilogy, Davey Cohen, is Jewish. Academic critics such as Ann Douglas have pointed out that Farrell, was, in fact, highly critical of the social milieu of his youth, and that the racially charged language accurately reflects the ethnic violence prevalent in Chicago during the Great Migration.

The police chief in Youngstown, Ohio, Edward J. Allen Jr., tried to ban the book in 1953 as "indecent" and "immoral," citing the cover of the paperback version which showed a group of boys looking at two attractive girls. He said the scene represented "the kind of ogling ... which our police officers would break up if they saw it." He was overruled by U.S. Federal Court Judge Charles J. McNamee.
