= Emily Cheney Neville =

American writer

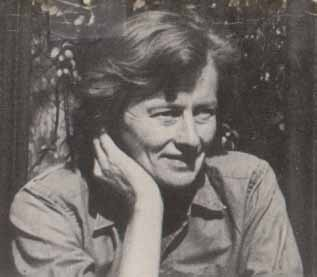
- Born: December 28, 1919; Manchester, Connecticut
- Died: December 14, 1997 (aged 77); Keene Valley, New York
- Education: Bryn Mawr College (1940)
- Spouse: Glenn Neville (m. 1948)
- Children: 5
- Awards: Newbery Medal (1964); Jane Addams Children's Book Award (1966)

Emily Cheney Neville (December 28, 1919 – December 14, 1997) was an American author. Her first book, It's Like This, Cat (1963), won the Newbery Medal in 1964.

== Personal life and education ==
Neville was born on December 28, 1919, in Manchester, Connecticut, to Howell and Anne Bunce Cheney, and was the youngest of her siblings. She attended Oxford School in Hartford, then graduated from Bryn Mawr College with a degree in economics in 1940.

Neville married Glenn Neville, a newspaperman, in 1948, and the couple had five children. After her children were born, she took a break from writing until all her children were school aged. The family lived in New York City.

Neville died December 14, 1997 in Keene Valley, New York.

== Career ==
After graduating from Bryn Mawr College in 1940, Neville worked for the New York Daily News and the New York Daily Mirror newspapers.

Her first book, It's Like This, Cat (1963), won the Newbery Medal in 1964. Her other works include Berries Goodman (1965); The Seventeenth-Street Gang (1966); Traveler From a Small Kingdom (1968); and Fogarty (1969).

"Her books have been praised by critics for their emphasis on realism and honest depiction of adolescent life," especially urban life.

In 1976, Neville received her J.D. from Albany Law School and began a private law practice, though she continued to write, publishing The Bridge in 1988 and The China Year in 1991.

== Awards and honors ==
Awards for Neville's writing
Year	Title	Award	Result	Ref.
1964	It's Like This, Cat	Newbery Medal	Winner	
1965	It's Like This, Cat	Vermont Golden Dome Book Award	Nominee	
1966	Berries Goodman	Jane Addams Children's Book Award	Winner	
1967	Berries Goodman	Vermont Golden Dome Book Award	Nominee	

== Publications ==
- It's Like This, Cat. Illustrated by Emil Weiss. Harper & Row. 1963.
- Berries Goodman. Harper Press. 1965.
- The Seventeenth-Street Gang. Trophy Press. 1966. ISBN 9780064400190.
- Traveler From a Small Kingdom. Illustrated by George Mocniak. HarperCollins Publishers. 1968.
- Fogarty. Harper & Row. 1969.
- Garden of Broken Glass. Delacorte Press. 1975. ISBN 9780440048398.
- The Bridge. Illustrated by Ronald Himler. HarperCollins Children's Books. 1988. ISBN 9780060243852.
- The China Year. HarperCollins Children's Books. 1991. ISBN 9780060243838.
