= The Young Manhood of Studs Lonigan =

1934 book by James T. Farrell

- Author: James T. Farrell
- Language: English
- Publisher: Vanguard Press
- Publication date: 1934
- LC Class: PZ3.F2465 Yom

The Young Manhood of Studs Lonigan is a 1934 novel by James T. Farrell, and the second part of Farrell's trilogy featuring the character William "Studs" Lonigan. This novel covers about 12 years in Studs Lonigan's life, from 1917 through 1928.

== Plot ==
At the end of Young Lonigan, Studs had completed elementary school, and was set to attend a prestigious Catholic high school. But as The Young Manhood of Studs Lonigan opens, Studs is hanging out at the pool hall and running with a rougher crowd. He has stopped going to school, but hasn't told his parents that. Together with his friends, he spends his time drinking, harassing black and Jewish kids, and looking for sex with loose local girls and with prostitutes.

When the United States enters World War 1 in 1917, Studs and his friends join in the general mood of jingoistic patriotism and try to join the Army, thinking that women will flock to have sex with heroic soldiers. But Studs and his friends are far too young to enlist, and are disrespectfully rejected by military recruiters. The war ends long before they are old enough to join up or see any action.

Studs' family eventually learns that he has dropped out of school. When confronted by his father, Studs runs away from home, and makes a comically inept attempt at armed robbery. At last, Studs returns home and takes a job working as a painter for his father. But having a steady income only allows Studs to pursue drinking and whoring more recklessly. The once athletic Studs begins to get fat, and contracts syphilis from a seemingly virginal girl he slept with.

Studs deludes himself that he's a tough customer who's widely feared and respected, but numerous incidents show that he is not nearly as tough as he imagines. During a neighborhood football game, he is repeatedly flattened by a Jewish player on the opposing team, and he is easily defeated during an amateur boxing match at the park. Nonetheless, Studs constantly reminds himself and others about the time he bested "Weary" Reilly in a streetcorner fight when they were kids. In his mind, that triumph was the high point of his life.

Studs goes on a date with Lucy Scanlan, the girl he has always loved, but the date goes badly, due to Studs' determination to play it cool. He says little to her and never shows her any of the tenderness or affection we know he feels for her. The night ends disastrously when he tries to force himself upon her sexually. Lucy eventually marries an accountant, and Studs never sees her again.

Meanwhile, Studs' old neighborhood is changing drastically, as Irish families rapidly move out and black families move in. Studs' father sells their home, and the Lonigans move to a new apartment building in South Chicago.

On New Year's Eve in 1928, a group of Studs' old friends holds a big party in the old neighborhood. Studs gets heavily intoxicated and makes a nuisance of himself while trying to have sex with various female guests. When he antagonizes old rival "Weary" Reilly, Reilly beats Studs to a pulp and then dumps him in the snow outside.
