= Chicago Mercantile Independent Battery Light Artillery =

- Active: August 29, 1862 - July 10, 1865
- Country: United States
- Allegiance: Union
- Branch: Artillery
- Engagements: Yazoo Pass Expedition; Battle of Chickasaw Bayou; Battle of Arkansas Post; Battle of Port Gibson; Battle of Champion Hill; Battle of Big Black River Bridge; Siege of Vicksburg, May 19 & May 22 assaults Red River Campaign; Battle of Sabine Crossroads

Chicago Mercantile Independent Battery Light Artillery was an artillery battery that served in the Union Army during the American Civil War.

== Service ==
The battery was organized in Camp Douglas, Chicago, Illinois, and mustered in for a three year enlistment on August 29, 1862, under the command of Captain Charles G. Cooley.

The battery was attached to 5th Division, District of Memphis, Tennessee, XIII Corps, Department of the Tennessee, and to 2nd Division, District of Memphis, Tennessee, XIII Corps, to December 1862. Artillery, 10th Division, Right Wing, XIII Corps, December 1862. Artillery, 1st Division, Sherman's Yazoo Expedition, to January 1863. Artillery, 10th Division, XIII Corps, Army of the Tennessee, to August 1863. Artillery, 4th Division, XIII Corps, Department of the Gulf, to March 1864. Artillery, 1st Division, XIII Corps, to June 1864. Defenses of New Orleans, Louisiana, to July 1864. Artillery Reserve, Department of the Gulf, to November 1864. Artillery, Cavalry Division, Department of the Gulf, to May 1865. Defenses of New Orleans, Louisiana, to July 1865.

Chicago Mercantile Independent Battery Light Artillery mustered out of service on July 10, 1865, in Chicago.

== Detailed service ==
Duty at Camp Douglass, near Chicago, Illinois, until November 8. Moved to Memphis, Tennessee, November 8–11, 1862. Grant's Central Mississippi Campaign November and December 1862. "Tallahatchie March" November 24 – December 12. Sherman's Yazoo Expedition December 20, 1862, to January 2, 1863. Chickasaw Bayou December 26-28. Chickasaw Bluff December 29. Expedition to Arkansas Post, Arkansas, January 3–10, 1863. Assault and capture of Fort Hindman. Arkansas Post, January 10–11. Moved to Young's Point, Louisiana, January 17, and duty there until March, and at Milliken's Bend, Louisiana, until April 25. Movement on Bruinsburg and turning Grand Gulf April 25–30. Battle of Magnolia Hills, or Port Gibson, May 1. Battle of Champion Hill May 16. Big Black River Bridge May 17. Siege of Vicksburg, Mississippi, May 18 – July 4. Assaults on Vicksburg May 19 and 22. Advance on Jackson, Mississippi, July 5–10. Siege of Jackson July 10–17. Ordered to New Orleans, Louisiana, August 6, then to Brashear City. Western Louisiana Campaign October 3 – November 30. Camp at Franklin until December 19. Moved to Algiers, Louisiana. Expedition to the Rio Grande, Texas, December 26, 1863 – January 1, 1864. At Pass Cavallo, Texas, until March. Ordered to Berwick City, Louisiana. Red River Campaign March–April. Battle of Sabine Cross Roads April 8. Retreat to Alexandria, then to New Orleans, Louisiana, April 9–30. Duty at Camp Parapet, Defenses of New Orleans, until November. Moved to Baton Rouge November 1. Davidson's Expedition against Mobile & Ohio Railroad November 27 – December 13. Moved to New Orleans December 31, then to Baton Rouge, and duty there until May 1865. At New Orleans, Louisiana, until June, then ordered home for muster out.

== Casualties ==
The battery lost a total of 18 men during service; 2 officers and 5 enlisted men killed or mortally wounded, 11 enlisted men died of disease.

== Commanders ==
- Captain Charles G. Cooley - resigned February 24, 1863
- Captain Patrick H. White - taken prisoner April 8, 1864

== Notable members ==
- Private John W. Arnold - Illinois State Senator (1890–1894) and United States Marshal (1894–1898)
- Quartermaster Sergeant William Liston Brown – prominent businessman (Pickands Brown & Company, First National Bank of Chicago, Lackawanna Steel Company)
- Private John Tyler Cutting – U.S. Representative from California (1891–1893)
- Corporal James Dunne - Medal of Honor recipient for action at Vicksburg on May 22, 1863
- Private Charles H. Kloth - Medal of Honor recipient for action at Vicksburg on May 22, 1863
- Private George Kretsinger - Medal of Honor recipient for action at Vicksburg on May 22, 1863
- Private Patrick McGuire - Medal of Honor recipient for action at Vicksburg on May 22, 1863
- Private William G. Stephens - Medal of Honor recipient for action at Vicksburg on May 22, 1863
- Captain Patrick H. White - Medal of Honor recipient for action at Vicksburg on May 22, 1863

== See also ==
- List of Illinois Civil War units
- Illinois in the Civil War
