= Patrick D. Tyrrell =

Irish American detective of the United States Secret Service

- Born: c. 1831; Dublin, Ireland
- Died: April 3, 1920 (aged 89); Chicago, Illinois, U.S.
- Resting place: Calvary Catholic Cemetery, Evanston, Illinois
- Occupation: United States Secret Service agent
- Known for: Stopping the plot to steal the body of Abraham Lincoln

Captain Patrick D. Tyrrell (c. 1831 – April 3, 1920) was an Irish American detective of the United States Secret Service who, as head of the field office in Chicago, became involved in foiling a plot to steal the remains of President Abraham Lincoln on November 7, 1876.

== Biography ==
Tyrrell was born in Dublin and moved to the United States as a child, growing up in Buffalo, New York. He entered law enforcement in 1856 in Dunkirk, New York, and later became a detective for the Erie Railroad. He moved to Chicago in 1869, where he and his wife Kate resided at a lakefront home near Lincoln Park; initially working as a private detective, he joined the Chicago Police Department under Chief Elmer Washburn. After Washburn was named Chief of the Secret Service in 1874, Tyrrell became one of his agents. In 1875, Tyrrell led the hunt for Benjamin Boyd, a prominent engraver who worked for a Chicago-based counterfeiting ring, and Nelson Driggs, a known dealer in counterfeit money. After a hunt that lasted eight months across five states, Tyrrell and his agents captured Boyd and his wife Almiranda in Fulton, Illinois on October 21, 1875; Chief Washburn apprehended Driggs in Centralia that same day. Boyd and Driggs were sentenced to ten and fifteen years respectively, and were held at the Illinois State Penitentiary in Joliet. For his work in bringing down Boyd and Driggs, Tyrrell was promoted to chief operative of the Chicago field office in January 1876.

=== The plot to steal Lincoln's body ===
After Boyd's arrest, Irish crime boss James "Big Jim" Kennally (or Kinealy) came up with a plan to steal the body of Abraham Lincoln from its tomb at Oak Ridge Cemetery in Springfield and hold it in exchange for Boyd's release and a full pardon, as well as a cash ransom. After an earlier plan by associates of Kennally in Logan County, a known hotbed for counterfeiting, failed in the summer of 1876, Kennally recruited Terence Mullen and Jack Hughes to carry out the plan, to steal Lincoln's body and bury it in the Indiana Dunes along Lake Michigan in exchange for a full pardon for Ben Boyd and $200,000 ($4,255,319 in 2021 dollars) in cash. At the Hub, a saloon on the South Side of Chicago, Mullen and Hughes recruited a third man, Lewis Swegles, who was in fact one of Tyrrell's informants.

On learning of the plot, Swegles brought word to Tyrrell, who immediately wired the new Chief of the Secret Service, James Brooks, requesting instructions; though it was not a counterfeiting case, Mullen and Hughes were known counterfeiters, and Tyrrell, horrified by the implications of the plot, called it a "damnable act" and a matter of "national importance". On October 27, 1876, Tyrrell met with Lincoln's only surviving child, Robert Todd Lincoln, and attorney Leonard Swett, who had contributed to Lincoln's presidential campaign in 1860. In that meeting, Tyrrell explained all the details he had of the plot and requested that he allow the crime to go forward in order to catch the criminals in the act; after initial hesitation, Robert Lincoln agreed. On November 2, Brooks approved Tyrrell's request to act on the information. Tyrrell then recruited a group of Secret Service agents and Pinkerton detectives to assist him in stopping the plot and apprehending the grave robbers. Mullen and Hughes decided on November 7, the day of the presidential election, to make their move.

Tyrrell and his agents followed the grave robbers on the overnight train from Chicago to Springfield on the evening of November 6 and met with John Carroll Power, the custodian of Lincoln's tomb, who agreed to assist Tyrrell in the stakeout. On the evening of November 7, while Mullen and Hughes made their move on the tomb, Tyrrell, Power, and his agents were waiting in the vestibule for Swegles to signal them; fearful of the echoes on the marble floor as they paced, they had removed their boots. Finally, Swegles gave the pre-arranged code word, "wash", and the agents moved in, but one of the Pinkertons accidentally discharged his pistol, causing the robbers to make a hasty retreat. Tyrrell briefly became embroiled in a gun battle with some of the Pinkerton detectives in the confusion that followed. Tyrrell and his agents arrested Mullen and Hughes in Chicago several days later.

=== Later life and legacy ===
In 1879, Tyrrell and his family moved to Topeka, Kansas, within the St. Louis District of the Secret Service. He and his wife divorced in 1899, and he subsequently retired from the Secret Service and returned to Chicago. He occasionally wrote "Stories of the Secret Service", one of which appeared in an edition of The Watertown Herald in Watertown, New York in 1905. Tyrrell died in Chicago on April 3, 1920, at the age of eighty-nine. After a High Requiem Mass at his parish church, St. Elizabeth's, on the South Side, Tyrrell was buried at Calvary Cemetery in Evanston.

For his role in foiling the plot, Robert Lincoln gave Tyrrell a full-size portrait of his father in 1877, followed by a written tribute to Tyrrell dated April 14, 1887; both of these items remain in the possession of Tyrrell's great-great-grandson, R. Emmett Tyrrell, Jr., the editor-in-chief of The American Spectator.
