= Patrick H. White =

Patrick H. White (June 1, 1832, in Sligo, Ireland – November 25, 1915) was an American Civil War Medal of Honor recipient.

== Early life ==
With his parents and siblings, he moved to Nova Scotia, Canada (though one source says they emigrated to Fredericton, New Brunswick) to escape the Great Famine of Ireland of the 1840s. The family then moved to Chicago, Illinois, United States, where White took a job in a meat-packing plant.

== Military career and honor ==
He joined an artillery militia group, which became known as the Chicago Artillery, or First Illinois Light Artillery Battery A after emigrating to Chicago. When the war broke out, the majority of the Artillery group's members went to fight - however, White opted not to, instead choosing to help raise his siblings as both his parents died.

He enlisted in the Union Army as a Second Lieutenant on August 15, 1861, joining another Chicago battery known as the First Illinois Light Artillery Battery B.

White served as commander of the Chicago Mercantile Independent Battery from 1863 to 1864. He was awarded the Medal of Honor for his actions on May 22, 1863 at Vicksburg, Mississippi, when, according to the United States Army's official Website, he "Carried with others by hand a cannon up to and fired it through an embrasure of the enemy's works." He was later captured at the Battle of Mansfield, and was held at Camp Ford until 1865.

== Burial ==
White is interred at St. Agnes Cemetery in Menands, New York.
