= Emmett Tyrrell =

20th-century American journalist

- Born: Robert Emmett Tyrrell Jr. December 14, 1943 (age 82); Chicago, Illinois, U.S.
- Education: Indiana University
- Occupations: Journalist, editor

Robert Emmett Tyrrell Jr. (born December 14, 1943) is an American conservative journalist. He is the founder and editor-in-chief of The American Spectator and writes with the byline "R. Emmett Tyrrell, Jr."

== Background ==
Tyrrell was born in Chicago, Illinois, and raised Roman Catholic. In 1961, he graduated from Fenwick High School in Oak Park, Illinois.

He attended Indiana University Bloomington, where he was on the swim team under coach James "Doc" Counsilman.

== Career ==
=== Arkansas Project ===
Tyrrell was one of those behind the Arkansas Project, financed by Richard Mellon Scaife, to use the Spectator to damage Bill Clinton's reputation. He detailed the project's purposes and accomplishments in his 2007 book The Clinton Crack-Up: The Boy President's Life after the White House.

=== Forced sale ===
In 2000, government investigations of The American Spectator caused Tyrrell to sell the magazine to venture capitalist George Gilder. In 2003, Gilder, having a series of financial and legal setbacks, resold the magazine back to Tyrrell and the American Alternative Foundation, the organization under which the magazine was originally started, for a dollar. The magazine was initially called The Alternative. The name of the owner was changed to the American Spectator Foundation. The magazine then moved operations back to the Washington, DC, area. Later that year, former book publisher Alfred S. Regnery became the magazine's publisher. By 2004, circulation hovered at around 50,000.

=== 1984 media appearance ===
Tyrrell appeared on a 1984 episode of Firing Line with William F. Buckley Jr., in which he debated with Christopher Hitchens the premise that the liberal movement was a failure, as asserted in Tyrrell's book The Liberal Crack-up.

=== Criticisms of homosexuality ===
Tyrrell was quoted in a 1994 article by New York Times contributor Dinitia Smith saying that homosexuals are bringing about "an end to community," and "AIDS is lethal, but they're forever trying to magnify a sensible point out of proportion. Heterosexual cases are practically nonexistent. The latest studies show that only 2 to 3 percent of Americans are homosexuals. Kinsey was wrong in saying it was 10 percent. There are thousands of years of moral teaching suggesting homosexuality is wrong."

=== Personal life ===
In 1972, Tyrrell married first wife Judy Mathews, with whom he had three children; they divorced in 1988. In 1998, Tyrrell married Jeanne M. Hauch at Holy Rosary Church, Washington, D.C.

Tyrrell is a practicing Catholic. He obtained a canonical annulment of his first marriage before his present union.

He served on the Board of Selectors of the Jefferson Awards Foundation.

Tyrrell is the great-great-grandson of Patrick D. Tyrrell, an immigrant from Ireland and a detective in the United States Secret Service in the 1870s, involved in foiling the plot to steal the body of Abraham Lincoln in 1876.

== Awards ==
- 1975: Samuel S. Beard Award for Greatest Public Service by an Individual 35 Years or Under from the Jefferson Awards for Public Service
- 1978: Ten Outstanding Young Men in America award in History. He now serves on the Board of Selectors for Jefferson Awards.

== Works ==
Tyrrell has written for Time, the Wall Street Journal, the London Spectator, The Daily Telegraph, The Guardian, The New York Times, The Washington Post, and The Washington Times. He was also a media fellow at the Hoover Institution.

- Public Nuisances (1979)
- The Liberal Crack-Up (1984)
- Orthodoxy: The American Spectator's 20th Anniversary Anthology (1987)
- The Conservative Crack-Up (1992)
- Boy Clinton: The Political Biography (1997)
- The Impeachment of William Jefferson Clinton (1997)
- Madame Hillary: The Dark Road to the White House (2003)
- The Continuing Crisis: As Chronicled for Four Decades (2009)
- After the Hangover: The Conservatives Road to Recovery (2010)
- The Death of Liberalism (2011)
