= John W. Arnold =

American politician

Member of the Illinois Senate from the 15th district
- In office 1890 – 1894
- Preceded by: Charles H. Bacon

Personal details
- Born: John William Arnold; February 14, 1842 White Creek, New York, U.S.
- Died: 1926 Chicago, Illinois, U.S.
- Party: Democratic
- Profession: Merchant

John William Arnold (February 14, 1842 – March 26, 1926) was an American politician from New York. Coming with his family to Lockport, Illinois, Arnold worked in his father's store until the outbreak of the Civil War. Arnold served with the 4th Regiment Illinois Volunteer Cavalry and the Chicago Mercantile Independent Battery Light Artillery, eventually being captured and imprisoned at Camp Ford, Texas. After the war he ran his father's store and was elected to two terms in the Illinois Senate. He was later named a United States Marshal.

== Biography ==
John William Arnold was born in White Creek, New York on February 14, 1842, the fourth of seven children to John H. and Lucretia Arnold. Arnold came with his family to Lockport, Illinois when he was fourteen. He graduated from Lockport High School in 1860 and briefly worked as a clerk in his father's store. When the Civil War began the next year, Arnold enlisted in the 4th Regiment Illinois Volunteer Cavalry of the Union Army.

He fought with the unit at Fort Henry, Fort Donelson, Corinth, Shiloh, and Hatcher's Run. He then fell ill with typhoid fever and was discharged on August 1, 1862. He returned after recovery with the Chicago Mercantile Independent Battery Light Artillery, where he fought at Arkansas Post, Port Gibson, Champion Hill, Big Black River Bridge, Vicksburg, and Mansfield. At Mansfield, the brigade was captured and Arnold made prisoner. He was confined at Camp Ford in Texas for fourteen months.

After his release was negotiated at the end of the war, Arnold returned to his father's store in Lockport. He was elected postmaster of Lockport in 1888, serving for a year. In 1890, he was elected to the Illinois Senate as a Democrat. He served two two-year terms. In 1894, President Grover Cleveland appointed Arnold Marshal of the Northern District of Illinois. He served for four years and then returned to the store in Lockport and engaged in some real estate and loan dealings in Chicago.

Arnold married Abbie Matthewson on December 22, 1869. They had three children, although only John W. Jr. survived to adulthood. He was the commander of the F. L. Gooding Post #401 Grand Army of the Republic.

John W. Arnold died March 26, 1026, in Chicago, Illinois.
