= William Liston Brown =

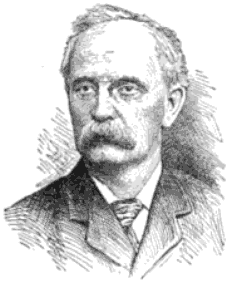
- Born: August 23, 1842; St. Joseph, Michigan
- Died: November 1, 1929 (aged 87); Pasadena, California

William Liston Brown (August 23, 1842 – November 1, 1929) was an American businessman and industrialist in Chicago, Illinois, United States. Brown served in the Chicago Mercantile Independent Battery Light Artillery during the Civil War, then developed Pickands, Brown & Company, a leading distributor of coke and pig iron. He later became a prominent leader in shipbuilding, directing the American Ship Building Company and several of its subsidiaries. He was also a director of the First National Bank of Chicago and Lackawanna Steel Company. Brown was a trustee of the Chicago Orchestra and Northwestern University.

== Biography ==
William Liston Brown was born in St. Joseph, Michigan, on August 23, 1842. He was the son of Hiram Brown, a grain trader. In 1848, the family moved to Chicago, Illinois. Brown attended public schools, then spent two years at the Garden City Academy. Upon graduation in 1858, he accepted a job as a clerk at H. Bacon & Company. Upon the outbreak of the Civil War, Brown enlisted in the Chicago Mercantile Independent Battery Light Artillery, serving until the end of the conflict. The unit saw action in the Vicksburg Campaign and the Red River Campaign. Brown rose from private to quartermaster sergeant.

After the war, Brown took a position as bookkeeper and cashier with A. B. Meeker & Company, becoming a partner in 1871. He purchased a controlling interest in 1883, renaming the company Pickands, Brown & Company. The company rose to become one of the largest distributors of pig iron and coke in the nation through a partnership with the Illinois Steel Company. In 1890, he co-founded the Chicago Ship Building Company. He was elected president of the organization nine years later and would later serve as chairman of the board of directors. Brown was also president of the South Chicago Furnace Company, a manufacturer of pig iron. Brown was a director of the Lackawanna Steel Company, American Ship Building Company, Detroit Ship Building Company, First National Bank of Chicago, the First Trust & Savings Bank of Chicago, Calumet Transit Company, and the Federal Furnace Company.

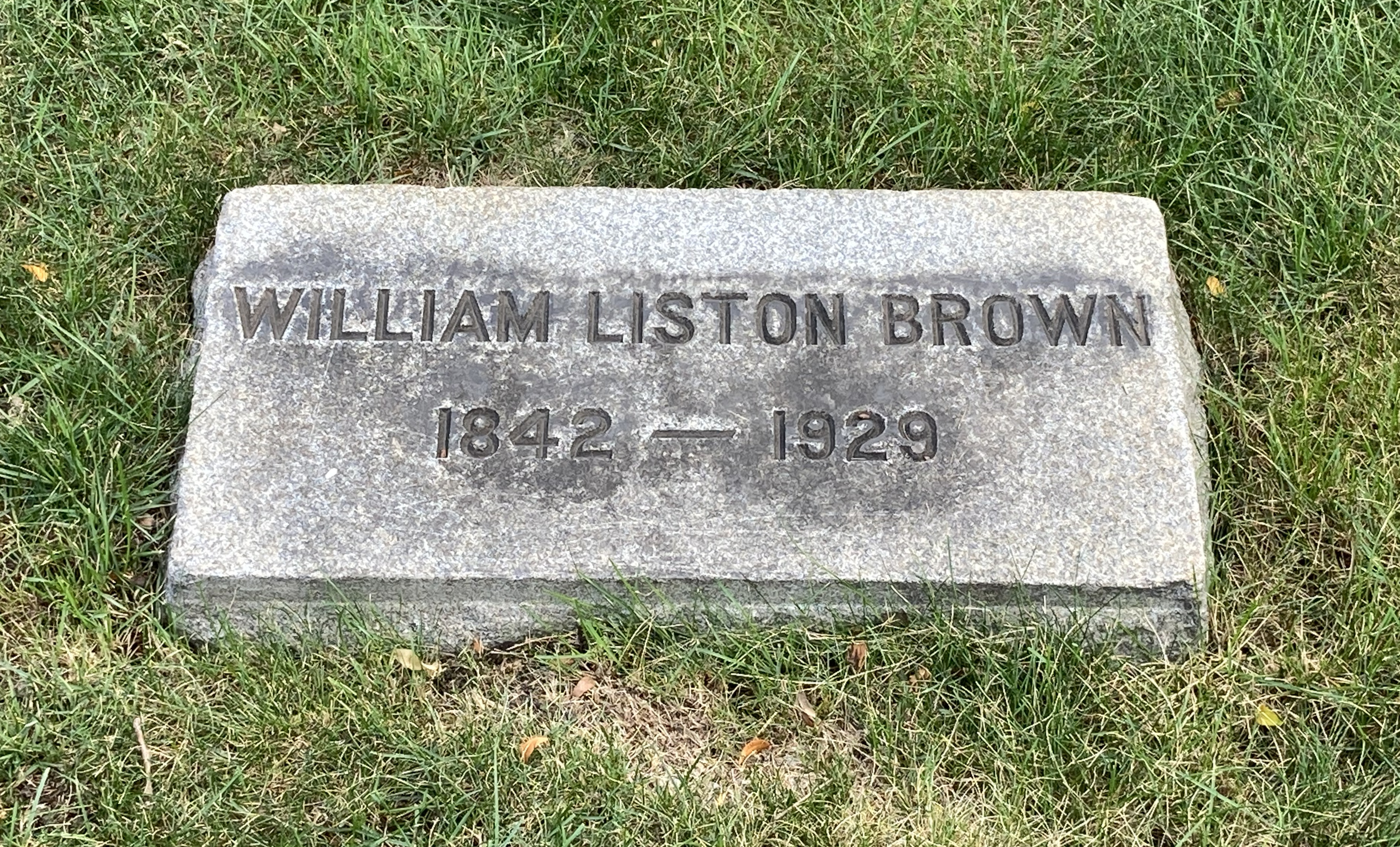
Brown's grave at Graceland Cemetery

Brown married Catherine Seymour in Chicago on September 27, 1871. In his free time, Brown enjoyed fishing and golf. He was a member of the Chicago, Commercial, Pointe Mouillee Shooting, Glen View, and Onwentsia Clubs. He was also a member of the Grand Army of the Republic and was a blue lodge Freemason. Daniel Burnham designed Brown's house in Evanston, Illinois. Brown was also a member of the board of trustees of Northwestern University and the Chicago Orchestra. He was a Republican, but never ran for public office. He died in Pasadena, California, on November 1, 1929, and was buried in Graceland Cemetery in Chicago.
