= Calvary Cemetery (Evanston, Illinois) =

Catholic cemetery in Cook County, Illinois

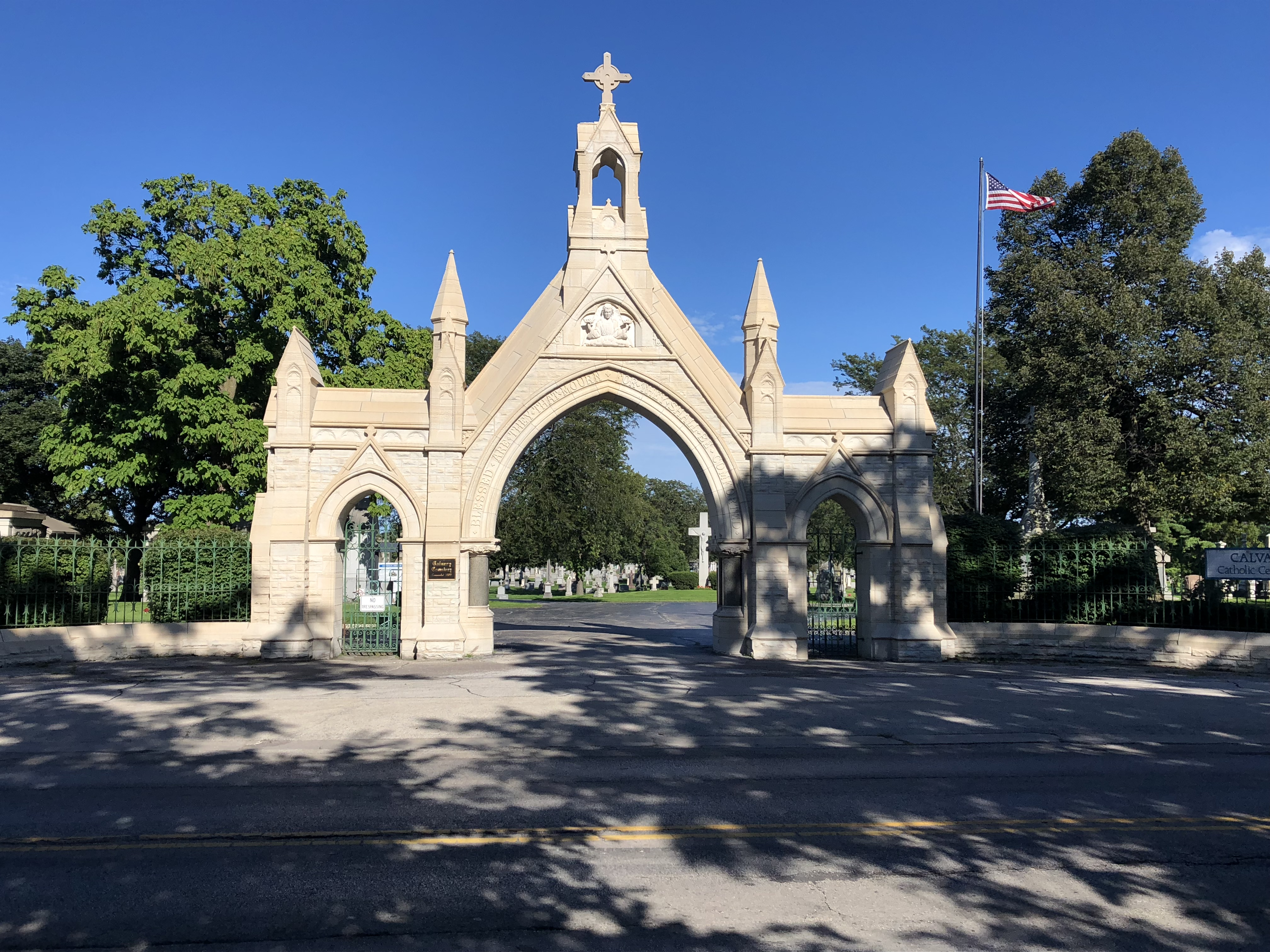
- Entrance gate on Chicago Avenue
- Interactive map of Calvary Cemetery

Details
- Established: 1859
- Location: 301 Chicago Ave. Evanston, IL
- Country: United States
- Coordinates: 42°1′30″N 87°40′20″W; GNIS: Calvary Catholic Cemetery
- Type: Catholic Cemetery
- No. of graves: >50,000
- Website: Official website

Calvary Catholic Cemetery is a Catholic cemetery in the Chicago suburb of Evanston, Illinois, United States.

The cemetery was consecrated on November 2, 1859 (All Souls Day) by Bishop James Duggan. The arched limestone entrance overlooking Evanston's Chicago Avenue was designed by Chicago architect James J. Egan.

== Notable burials ==
- James R. Buckley, US congressman
- Jane Byrne, first female mayor of Chicago
- Charles Comiskey, founding owner of the Chicago White Sox
- John Coughlin, 1st ward alderman from 1892 to 1938
- John Creed, Civil War Medal of Honor recipient
- Thomas Cusack, US congressman
- William Emmett Dever, mayor of Chicago from 1923 to 1926
- Edward Fitzsimmons Dunne, Illinois governor
- James Dunne, Civil War Medal of Honor recipient
- James Thomas Farrell, author
- John Frederick Finerty, US congressman
- George Peter Foster, US congressman
- John Gottselig, ice hockey player
- James H. Hallinan, MLB player
- George Peter Alexander Healy, Abraham Lincoln portrait painter
- John Patrick Hopkins, mayor of Chicago from 1893 to 1895
- Edward N. Hurley, Chairman of the Federal Trade Commission
- Edward Joseph Kelly, mayor of Chicago from 1933 to 1947
- Martin H. Kennelly, mayor of Chicago from 1947 to 1955
- Frank Lawler, US congressman
- Elmer Layden, Hall of Fame football player
- Roland Victor Libonati, US congressman
- William Lorimer, US congressman and senator
- William F. Mahoney, US representative from 1901 to 1904
- James McAndrews, US congressman
- Patrick McGuire, Civil War Medal of Honor recipient
- Frederic McLaughlin, first owner of the Chicago Black Hawks NHL team in 1926. He named the team after his WWI army unit, the 86th Infantry "Blackhawk" Division
- Hugh Molloy, Civil War Medal of Honor recipient
- William J. Moxley, US congressman
- James A. Mulligan, Civil War brevet general
- Hank O'Day, MLB umpire
- Marie Owens, first policewoman in Chicago, first known female police officer in America
- Emmett Paré, professional tennis player and coach
- John W. Rainey, US representative from 1918 to 1923
- Alexander John Resa, US congressman
- Jimmy Ryan, MLB player
- James Michael Slattery, US senator
- Edmund J. Stack, US congressman
- Patrick D. Tyrrell, Secret Service detective
- Victims of the Haymarket Affair (1886)
- Victims of the Iroquois Theatre Fire (1903)
- Victims of the Eastland Disaster (1915)
- Howard Wakefield, MLB player
- James Hugh Ward, US congressman
