= John Creed (soldier) =

American Union Army soldier (c.1819–1872)

- Born: c. 1819; Tipperary, Ireland
- Died: November 28, 1872 (aged 52–53); Illinois
- Burial place: Calvary Cemetery, Evanston, Illinois
- Military career
- Allegiance: United States
- Branch: United States Army; Union Army
- Service years: 1862–1865
- Rank: Corporal
- Unit: 23rd Illinois Volunteer Infantry Regiment
- Conflicts: American Civil War • Battle of Fisher's Hill
- Awards: Medal of Honor

John Creed (c. 1819 – November 28, 1872) was an Irish born Union Army soldier during the American Civil War. He received the Medal of Honor for gallantry during the Battle of Fisher's Hill near Strasburg, Virginia fought September 21–24, 1864. The battle was one of the engagements of the Valley Campaigns of 1864.

Creed joined the 23rd Illinois Infantry in August 1862, and was discharged in June 1865.

== Medal of Honor citation ==
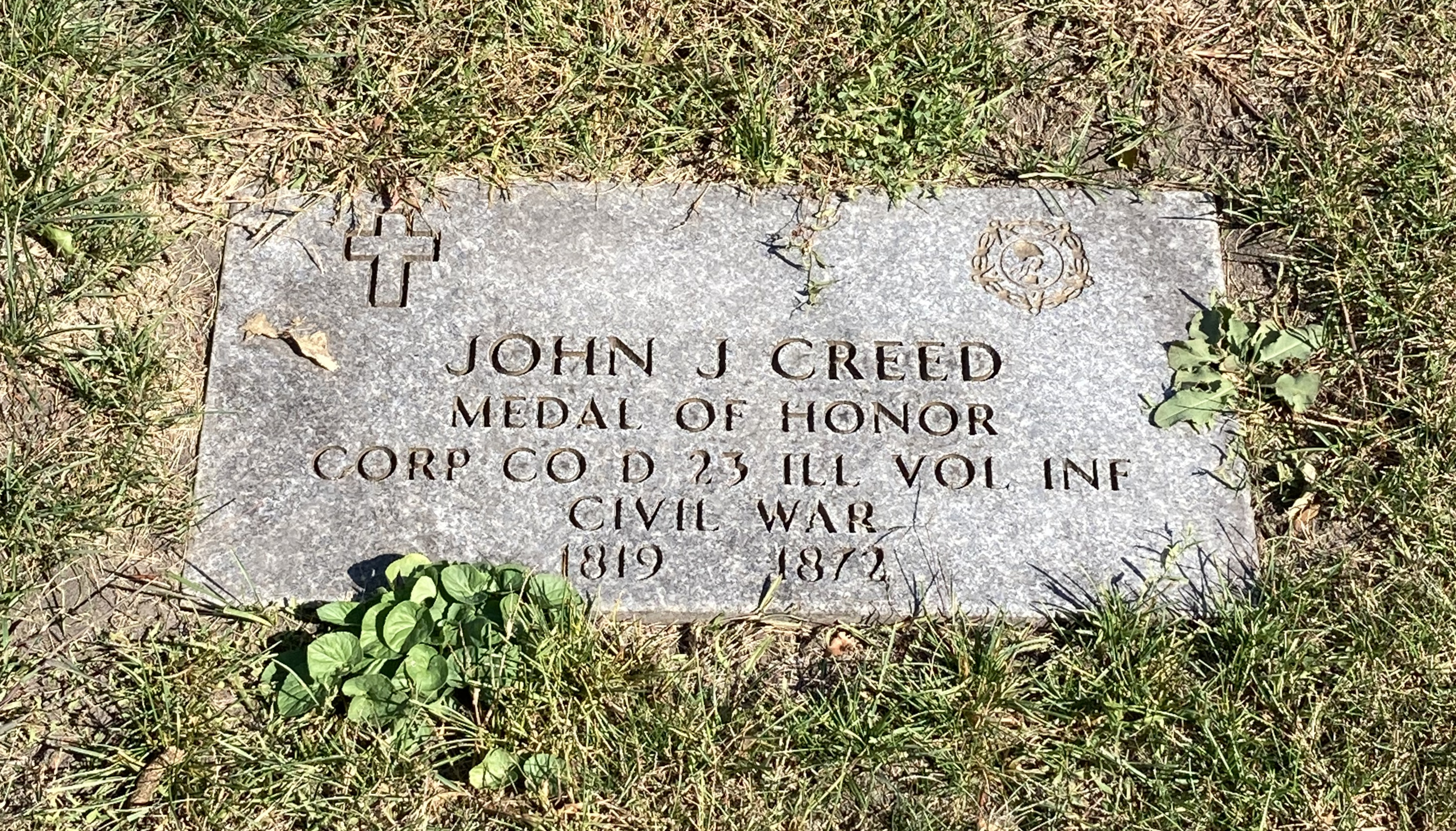
Creed's Grave at Calvary Cemetery

The President of the United States of America, in the name of Congress, takes pleasure in presenting the Medal of Honor to Private John Creed, United States Army, for extraordinary heroism on 22 September 1864, while serving with Company D, 23d Illinois Infantry, in action at Fisher's Hill, Virginia, for capture of flag.

== See also ==
- List of Medal of Honor recipients
- List of American Civil War Medal of Honor recipients: A–F
