= James Dunne (Medal of Honor) =

Medal of Honor recipient

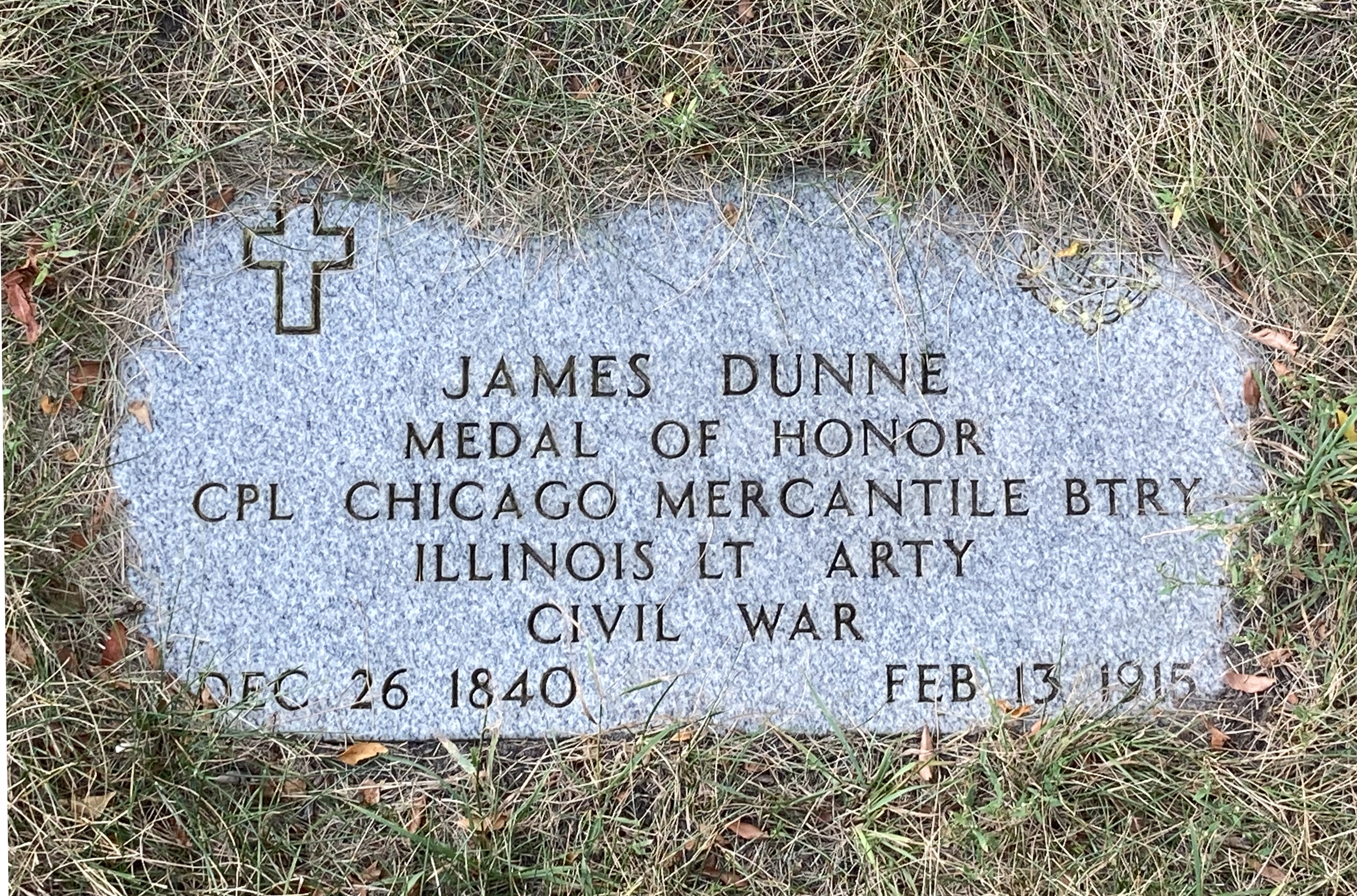
- Grave at Calvary Cemetery
- Born: December 26, 1840; Detroit, Michigan
- Died: February 13, 1915 (aged 74); Evanston, Illinois
- Burial place: Calvary Cemetery
- Military career
- Allegiance: United States of America
- Branch: United States Army
- Rank: Corporal
- Unit: Chicago Mercantile Battery, Illinois Volunteer Light Artillery
- Conflicts: Battle of Vicksburg
- Awards: Medal of Honor

Corporal James Dunne (December 26, 1840 – February 13, 1915) was an American soldier who fought in the American Civil War. Dunne received the country's highest award for bravery during combat, the Medal of Honor, for his action during the Battle of Vicksburg in Mississippi on May 22, 1863. He was honored with the award on January 15, 1895.

== Biography ==
Dunne was born in Detroit, Michigan, on December 26, 1840. He enlisted into the Illinois Light Artillery. He died on February 13, 1915, and his remains are interred at the Calvary Cemetery in Evanston, Illinois.

== Medal of Honor citation ==
Carried with others by hand a cannon up to and fired it through an embrasure of the enemy's works.

== See also ==
- List of American Civil War Medal of Honor recipients: A–F
