= John Carroll Power =

American historian

- Born: September 19, 1819; Fleming County, Kentucky, U.S.
- Died: January 11, 1894 (aged 74); Springfield, Illinois, U.S.
- Resting place: Oak Ridge Cemetery, Springfield, Illinois
- Occupation(s): Historian, author
- Known for: First custodian of the tomb of Abraham Lincoln, founder of the Lincoln Guard of Honor
- Spouse: Sarah A. Harris (1845-1891; her death)

John Carroll Power (September 19, 1819 – January 11, 1894) was an American historian who served as the first custodian of the tomb of Abraham Lincoln, the 16th President of the United States, at Oak Ridge Cemetery in Springfield, Illinois, from its opening in 1874 to his death in 1894.

== Biography ==
Power was born near Flemingsburg, Kentucky, into a struggling farm family. After failed attempts at working the land in Kansas, Power gave up farming and moved to Springfield, Lincoln's long-time hometown, where he took up writing on the history of the city and Sangamon County, as well as on the life of Lincoln. He married Sarah A. Harris in her native town of Aurora, Indiana on May 14, 1845, and remained married to her until her death in 1891; they had no children.

On October 28, 1874, the day before it opened to the public, the Lincoln Monument Association named Power the first custodian of Lincoln's tomb at Oak Ridge Cemetery. Power maintained a collection of Lincoln relics in the Memorial Hall (now the entrance vestibule in the modern tomb) and often gave guided tours of the tomb.

=== The attempted theft and the Guard of Honor ===
In 1876, as the nation celebrated its centennial, a gang of counterfeiters based out of Chicago concocted a plan to steal Lincoln's body from the tomb and hold it hostage in exchange for a pardon for their imprisoned engraver and a cash reward. On the morning of November 7, Secret Service detective Patrick D. Tyrrell, who had learned of the plot, asked Power to assist in stopping it. That afternoon, two of the plotters visited the tomb and received the guided tour from Power, and that night Power and the detectives hid in the Memorial Hall to prevent the theft.

On February 12, 1880, the "Lincoln Guard of Honor" was formed, with Power as secretary, for public ceremonies at Lincoln's tomb and protection of the remains of the Lincoln and his family.

=== Later life and death ===
Power wrote an account of the plot to steal Lincoln's body, as well as a history of the services of the Guard of Honor, in 1890. He died on January 11, 1894, after a stroke. He was buried at Oak Ridge Cemetery next to his wife, Sarah, who had died three years earlier; his gravestone notes that he "was on duty the night of Nov. 7, 1876 when ghouls attempted to steal the body of President Lincoln".

== Works ==
- The Rise and Progress of Sunday Schools: A Biography of Robert Raikes and William Fox (1863)
- History of Springfield, Illinois: Its Attractions as a Home and Advantages for Business, Manufacturing, Etc. (1871)
- Abraham Lincoln: His Life, Public Services, Death and Great Funeral Cortege; With a History and Description of the National Lincoln Monument (1875)
- History of the Early Settlers of Sangamon County, Illinois (1876)
- History of an Attempt to Steal the Body of Abraham Lincoln (Late President of the United States of America) Including a History of the Lincoln Guard of Honor, with Eight Years Lincoln Memorial Services (1890)
