= Charles H. Kloth =

Union Army soldier in the American Civil War

- Born: Europe
- Military career
- Allegiance: United States
- Branch: Union Army
- Rank: Private
- Units: Chicago Mercantile Battery, Illinois Light Artillery
- Conflicts: American Civil War; Battle of Vicksburg
- Awards: Medal of Honor

Charles H. Kloth was a Union Army soldier in the American Civil War who received the U.S. military's highest decoration, the Medal of Honor.

Outside of his military service, Kloth's life is obscure, but it is known that he was born in Europe, and entered service in Chicago, Illinois. He was awarded the Medal of Honor, for extraordinary heroism shown in Henrico County, Virginia, for bravery in action during the Battle of Vicksburg, while serving as a Private with the Chicago Mercantile Battery in the Illinois Light Artillery on May 22, 1863. His Medal of Honor was issued on July 20, 1897.

It is not known when Kloth died, or where he was buried.

== Medal of Honor citation ==
The President of the United States of America, in the name of Congress, takes pleasure in presenting the Medal of Honor to Private George Kretsinger, United States Army, for extraordinary heroism on 22 May 1863, while serving with Chicago Mercantile Battery, Illinois Light Artillery, in action at Vicksburg, Mississippi. Private Kretsinger carried, with others, by hand, a cannon up to and fired it through an embrasure of the enemy's works.
