= State funeral of Abraham Lincoln =

1865 Funeral of the 16th U.S. president

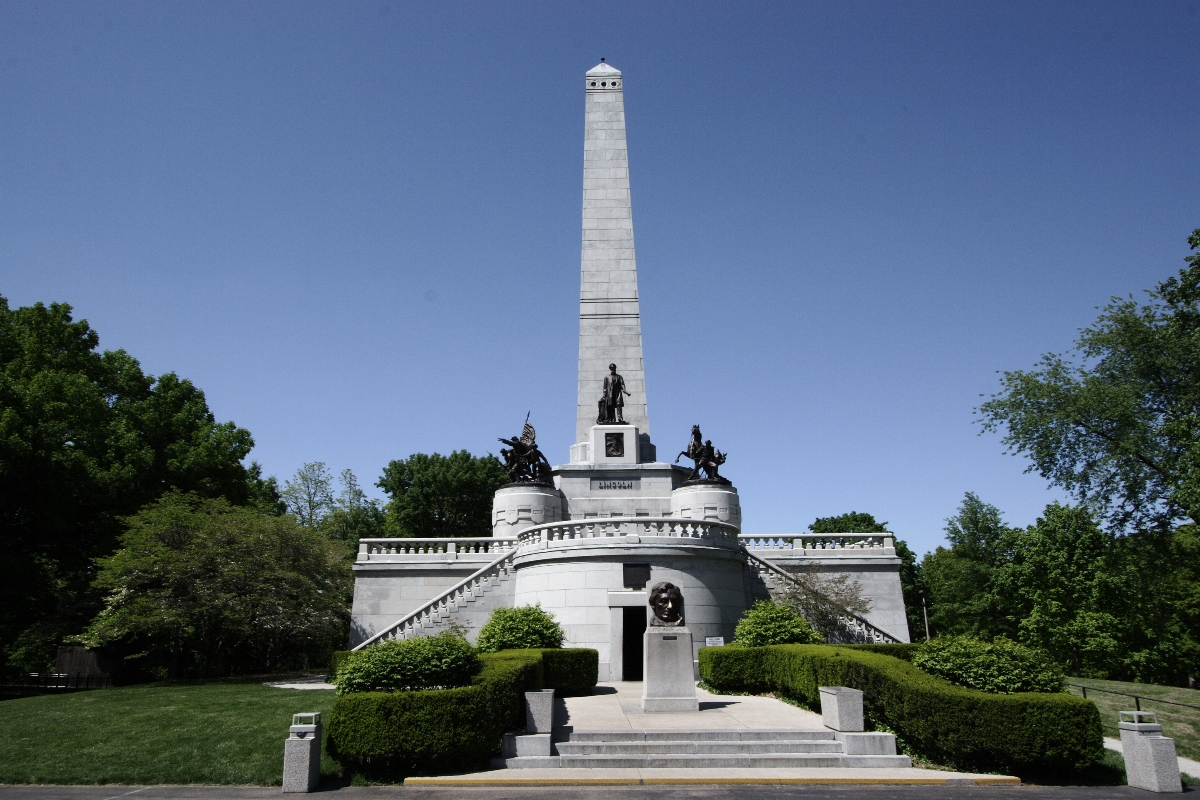
Lincoln's tomb at Oak Ridge Cemetery in Springfield, Illinois

After Abraham Lincoln was assassinated on April 14, 1865, a three-week series of events was held to mourn the death and memorialize the life of the 16th president of the United States. Funeral services, a procession, and a lying in state were first held in Washington, D.C., then a funeral train transported Lincoln's remains 1,654 miles (2,662 km) through seven states for burial in Springfield, Illinois. Never exceeding 20 mph, the train made several stops in principal cities and state capitals for processions, orations, and additional lyings in state. An estimated 7 million Americans, or approximately one-third of the North's population viewed the train along the route and 25 million participated in associated ceremonies.

The train left Washington, D.C., on April 21 at 8:00 am. It bore Lincoln's eldest son Robert Todd and the remains of Lincoln's younger son, William Wallace Lincoln (1850–1862), (Note: Since his death from typhoid fever at the White House in 1862, William "Willy" Lincoln's coffin had been temporarily placed in the Carroll mausoleum in Georgetown's Oak Hill Cemetery) but not Lincoln's wife Mary Todd Lincoln, who was too distraught to make the trip. The train largely retraced the route Lincoln had traveled to Washington as the president-elect on his way to his first inauguration, more than four years earlier. The train arrived at Springfield on May 3. After the final lying in state and related services, Lincoln was interred during a ceremony on May 4, at Oak Ridge Cemetery in Springfield. In every town the train passed or stopped there was a crowd to pay their respects.

By 1874, several features had been added to the Lincoln Tomb, including a 117-foot (36 m)-tall granite obelisk surrounded with several bronze statues of Lincoln and soldiers and sailors. Mary Todd Lincoln and three of their four sons—Willie, Eddie, and Tad—are also buried there. (Note: Robert Todd Lincoln is buried in Arlington National Cemetery near Washington, DC.) Today, it is owned and managed as a state historic site and is a National Historic Landmark.

== Washington, D.C. ==
After the assassination of Abraham Lincoln by John Wilkes Booth, Lincoln's body was carried by an honor guard to the White House on Saturday April 15, 1865. He lay in state in the East Room of the White House which was open to the public on Tuesday, April 18. On April 19, a funeral service was held and then the coffin, attended by large crowds, was transported in a procession down Pennsylvania Avenue to the Capitol Rotunda, where a ceremonial burial service was held. The body again lay in state on the 20th and on the early morning of the following day a prayer service was held for the Lincoln cabinet officials.

== Funeral train to Springfield, Illinois ==
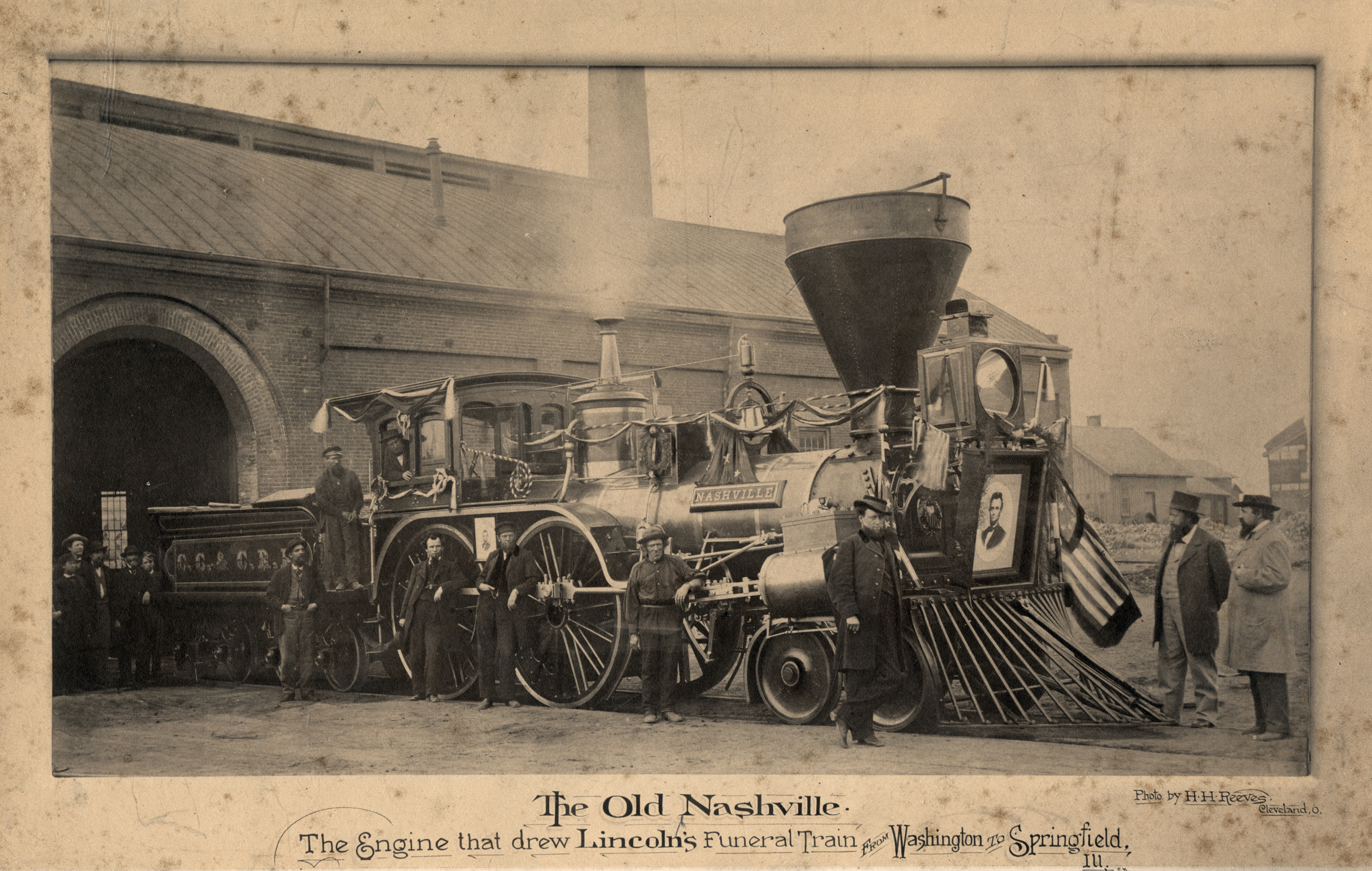
Lincoln's funeral train, the Old Nashville, departing Washington, D.C. for Springfield, Illinois. It stopped in eleven other cities along the way.

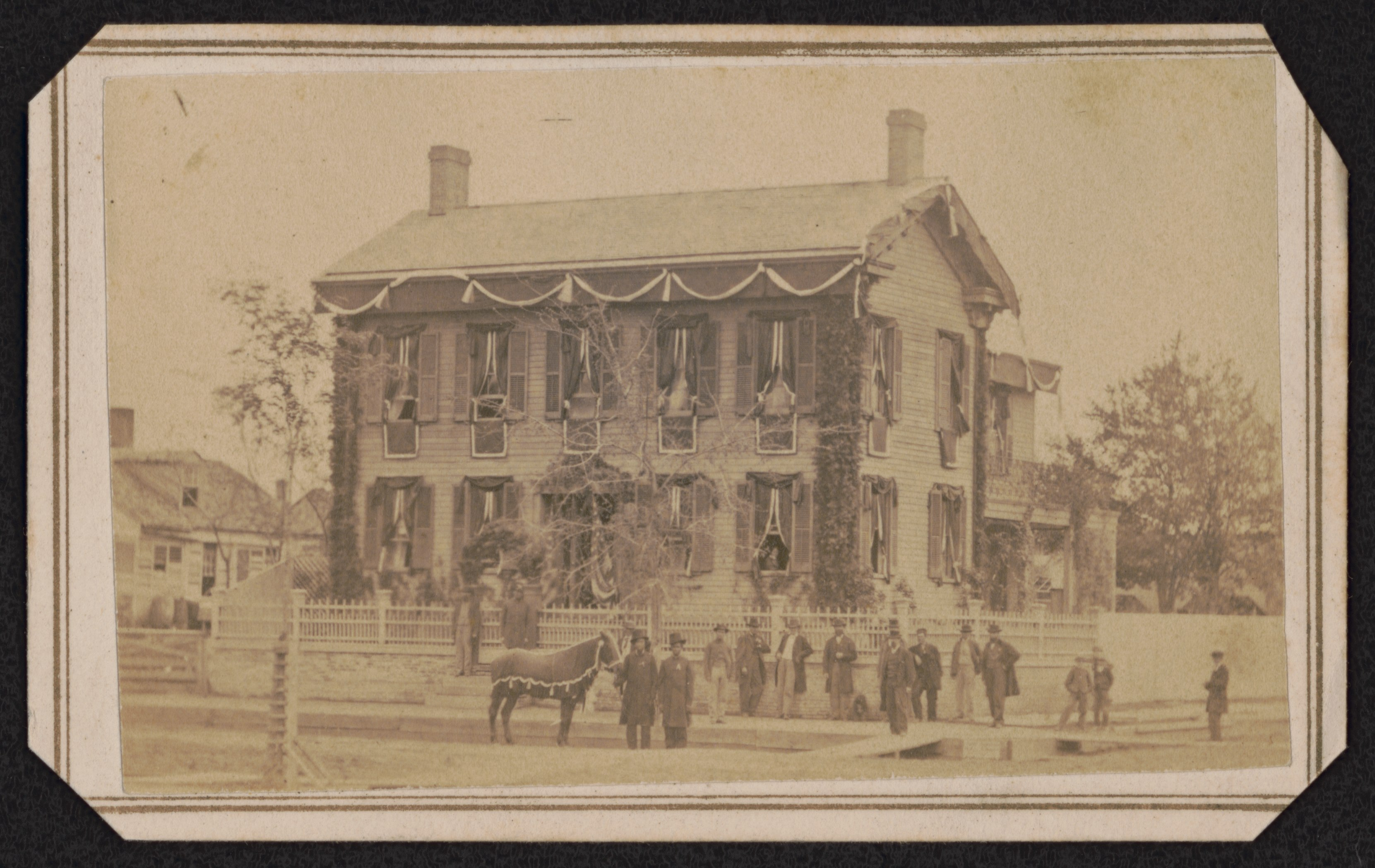
Lincoln's house in Springfield, Illinois, draped in mourning with his horse "Old Bob" in front in 1865

At 7 a.m. on Friday, April 21, the Lincoln coffin was taken by honor guard to the depot. Cabinet secretaries Edwin M. Stanton, Gideon Welles, Hugh McCulloch, and John Palmer Usher, as well as, generals Ulysses S. Grant, and Montgomery C. Meigs left the escort at the depot, and at 8 a.m. the train departed. At least 10,000 people witnessed the train's departure from Washington.

The funeral train had nine cars, including a baggage car, hearse car, and the President's car, built for use by the president and other officials and containing a parlor, sitting room, and sleeping apartment. The President's car was draped in mourning and carried the coffins of Lincoln and his son. New locomotives were substituted at several points.

The Department of War designated the route and declared the railroads used as military roads. Only persons authorized by the State Department were allowed to travel on the train, which was limited to 20 miles (32 km) an hour for safety. A pilot train preceded it to ensure the track was clear.

Five relatives and family friends were appointed to accompany the funeral train: David Davis, Associate Justice of the Supreme Court of the United States; Lincoln's brothers-in-law, Ninian Wirt Edwards and C. M. Smith; Brigadier General John Blair Smith Todd, a cousin of Mary Todd Lincoln; and Charles Alexander Smith, the brother of C. M. Smith.

An honor guard accompanied the train; this consisted of Union Army Major General David Hunter; brevet Major General John G. Barnard; Brigadier Generals Edward D. Townsend, Charles Thomas Campbell, Amos Beebe Eaton, John C. Caldwell, Alfred Terry, George D. Ramsey, and Daniel McCallum; Union Navy Rear Admiral Charles Henry Davis and Captain William Rogers Taylor; and Marine Corps Major Thomas H. Field.

Four accompanied the train in a logistics capacity: Captain Charles Penrose, as quartermaster and commissary of subsistence; Ward Hill Lamon, Lincoln's longtime bodyguard and friend and U.S. Marshal for the District of Columbia; and Dr. Charles B. Brown and Frank T. Sands, embalmer and undertaker, respectively.

Governor Oliver P. Morton of Indiana; Governor John Brough of Ohio; and Governor William M. Stone of Iowa accompanied the train with their aides.

Lincoln's funeral train was the first national commemoration of a president's death by rail. Lincoln was observed, mourned, and honored by the citizens and visitors at 13 stops: Washington, D.C., Baltimore, Harrisburg, Philadelphia, New York City, Albany, Buffalo, Cleveland, Columbus, Indianapolis, Michigan City, Chicago, and Springfield:

The trajectory of Lincoln's funeral train from Washington, D.C. to Springfield, Illinois

City	Arrive	Lying in state in	Public viewing from / until	Depart	Image
Washington, D.C.	Remark #1	East Room, White House	public viewing: April 18, 1865: 9:30 a.m. / 5:30 p.m. & OPEN COFFIN private viewing: April 18, 5:30 p.m. / 7:30 p.m.		East Room of White House
	Remark #2	United States Capitol rotunda	April 20, 1865: 8 a.m. / all day	April 21, 1865: 8 a.m.	
Baltimore, Maryland	April 21, 1865: 10 a.m.	Merchant's Exchange Building	April 21, 1865: noon / 2 p.m.	April 21, 1865: 3 p.m.	
Harrisburg, Pennsylvania	April 21, 1865: 8:30 p.m.	Pennsylvania State Capitol	April 21, 1865: until midnight & April 22, 1865: 7 a.m. / 9 a.m.	April 22, 1865: 11:15 a.m.	
Philadelphia, Pennsylvania	April 22, 1865: 4:50 p.m.	Independence Hall	private viewing: April 22, 1865: 10 p.m. / April 23, 1865: 1 a.m. & public viewing: April 23, 1865: 6 a.m. / April 24, 1865: 1:17 a.m.	April 24, 1865: 4 a.m.	
New York City	April 24, 1865: 10:50 a.m.	City Hall	April 24, 1865: 1 p.m. / April 25, 1865: 11:40 a.m	April 25, 1865: 4:15 p.m.	
Albany, New York	April 25, 1865: 10:55 p.m.	Old Capitol	April 26, 1865: 1:15 a.m. / 2 p.m..	April 26, 1865: 4 p.m.	
Buffalo, New York	April 27, 1865: 7 a.m.	St. James Hall	April 27, 1865: 10:00 a.m. / 8 p.m.	April 27, 1865: 10 p.m.	
Cleveland, Ohio	April 28, 1865: 6:50 a.m.	Public Square	April 28, 1865: 10:30 a.m. / 10 p.m.	April 29, 1865: Midnight	
Columbus, Ohio	April 29, 1865: 7 a.m.	Ohio Statehouse	April 29, 1865: 9:30 a.m. / 6 p.m.	April 29, 1865: 8 p.m.	
Indianapolis, Indiana	April 30, 1865: 7 a.m.	Indiana Statehouse	April 30, 1865: 9 a.m. / 10 p.m.	May 1, 1865: Midnight	
Michigan City, Indiana	May 1, 1865: 8 a.m.		Remark #3	May 1, 1865: 8:35 a.m.	
Chicago	May 1, 1865: 11 a.m.	Old Chicago Court House	May 1, 1865: 5 p.m. / May 2, 1865: 8 p.m.	May 2, 1865: 9:30 p.m.	
Springfield, Illinois	May 3, 1865: 9 a.m.	Old State Capitol	May 3, 1865: 10 a.m. / May 4, 1865: 10 a.m.	Arrival Oak Ridge Cemetery: May 4, 1865: 1 p.m.	

The train passed 444 communities in 7 states (Lincoln was not viewed in state in New Jersey). Two future presidents viewed the train, Theodore Roosevelt in New York and Grover Cleveland in Buffalo.

Remarks

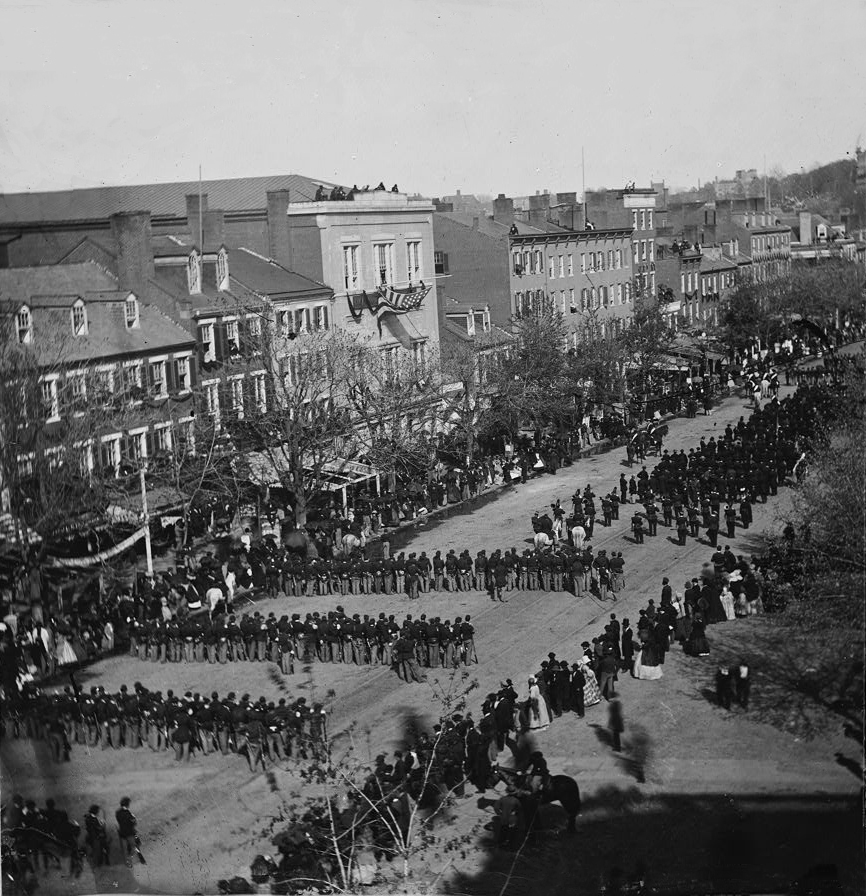
Military units marching down Pennsylvania Avenue in Washington D.C., during the state funeral for Abraham Lincoln on April 19, 1865

- Remark #1: April 15–19, 1865: body of the deceased president in the White House; shortly after 9 o'clock Saturday morning on April 15, 1865, the remains were placed in a temporary coffin, under the direction of undertaker Frank T. Sands, and moved to the White House with six young men of the quartermaster's department carrying the body. An escort of cavalry Union Light Guard, under the command of Lieutenant James B. Jameson, accompanied the remains, which were followed by Generals Augur, commanding Department of Washington; Rucker, depot quartermaster, Colonel Pelouze, of the War Department, Captain Finley Anderson, A.A.G. Hancock's corps, Captain D.G. Thomas, clothing depot, Captain J.H. Crowell and Captain C. Baker, all walking bareheaded. The hearse moved slowly up 10th street to G, and thence to the White House (east gate). The martyred president's autopsy was performed in a second floor guest room by army pathologist J. Janvier Woodward and his assistant Edward Curtis; also present: Surgeon General Dr. Joseph K. Barnes, Dr. Robert King Stone, Dr. Charles Sabin Taft, General Dr. Charles H. Crane, assistant surgeon William Morrow Notson, General Rucker and Lincoln's friend Orville H. Browning. After the autopsy Lincoln's body was brought (Monday evening, April 17) to the great East Room; the room was draped with crape and black cloth, relieved only here and there by white flowers and green leaves. The catafalque upon which the casket lay was about fifteen feet high, and consisted of an elevated platform resting on a dais and covered with a domed canopy of black cloth which was supported by four pillars, and was lined beneath with fluted white silk... From the time the body had been made ready for burial until the last services in the house, it was watched night and day by a guard of honor, the members of which were one major-general, one brigadier-general, two field officers, and four line officers of the army and four of the navy. The room was darkened — a sort of chapelle ardente. April 19: a short service was held in the Green Room
- Remark #2: April 19–21, 1865: lying in state in the U.S. Capitol rotunda. Arrival: April 19, 1865, 3 p.m. The procession started from the White House at 2 p.m. and proceeded up Pennsylvania Avenue to the Capitol amidst the tolling of bells and the firing of minute-guns. The funeral car was large. The lower base was fourteen feet [4.2 m] long and seven feet [2.1 m] wide, and eight feet [2.4 m] from the ground. The upper base, upon which the coffin rested, was eleven feet [3.4 m] long and five feet [1.5 m] below the top of the canopy. The canopy was surmounted by a gilt eagle, covered with crape. The hearse was entirely covered with cloth, velvet, crape and alpaca. The seat was covered with cloth, and on each side was a splendid lamp. The car was fifteen feet [4.6 m] high, and the coffin was so placed as to afford a full view to all spectators. It was drawn by six gray horses, each attended by a groom. The avenue was cleared the whole length... The sound of muffled drums was heard, and the procession, with a slow and measured tread, moved from the home of mourning on its mission with the remains of the illustrious dead. Despite the enormous crowd the silence was profound. The funeral car was carried up the steps of the Capitol, beneath the spot where, six weeks before, the president had delivered his second Inaugural, and into the rotunda, where the body was removed from the car to another catafalque, where a service was read. Here the procession dispersed, leaving the remains of the president in the rotunda, where they were open to view the next day—The public viewing started April 20, 1865 (early morning)-- Depart from U.S. Capitol: April 21, 1865, 7 a.m.; coffin moved to Washington's Baltimore & Ohio Railroad Depot
- Remark #3: Michigan City, Ind. was a 35 min. stop; Lincoln's funeral train was forced to wait here for a committee of more than one hundred important men from Chicago, who were coming out to escort the train into their city; citizens of Michigan City held an impromptu funeral (patriotic organizations conducted memorial services and 16 young women were permitted to enter the funeral car; flowers were placed on the coffin) –

=== Commemoration ===
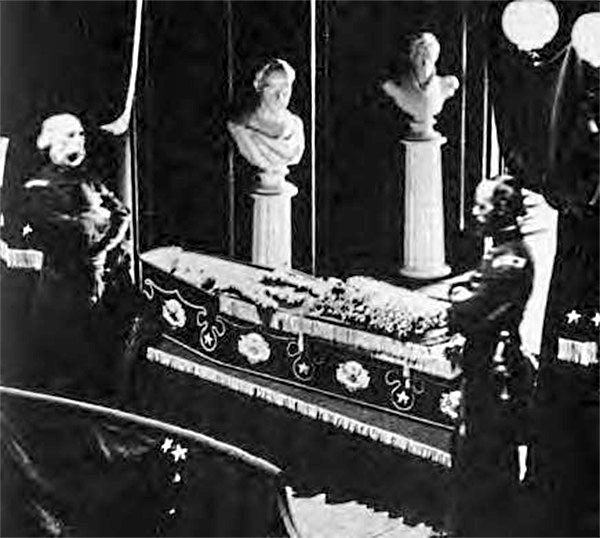
Only known photo taken of Abraham Lincoln lying in his casket at New York City Hall April 24, 1865.

There is an immersive laying in state exhibit in the Abraham Lincoln Presidential Library and Museum in Springfield, Illinois. The exhibit is a full-scale recreation of the Representative's Hall in the Old State Capital Building in Springfield. It is based on period photographs and etchings, as well as reporter's descriptions. The hall depicts the moment Lincoln was laid in state there, with lavish, elaborate, and sometimes odd decorations, including a replica black casket.

== Burial site selection ==
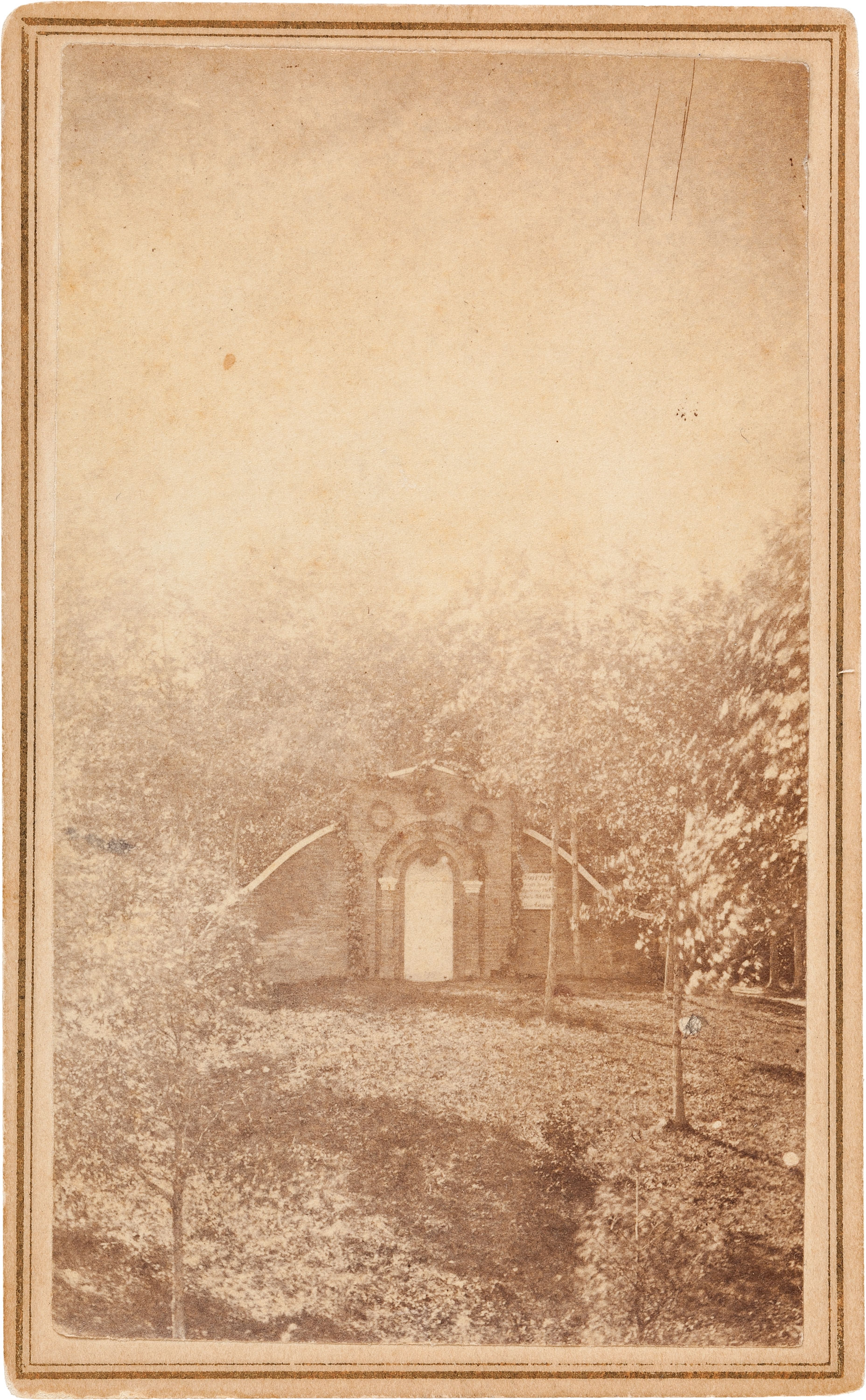
The Mather Vault

Shortly after Lincoln's death, a delegation of Illinois citizens (later forming the National Lincoln Monument Association) asked Mrs. Lincoln to return her husband's remains to Springfield for burial. She agreed, and the group then researched various sites in and around Springfield, selecting a centrally located, hilltop site known as Mather Block, and a temporary receiving vault was built there. However, Mrs. Lincoln selected Oak Ridge Cemetery for her husband's burial. Despite repeated attempts by the association to change the location of the burial to Mather Block, she remained firm in her decision.

=== Springfield's choice: The Mather Vault ===
A large number of Illinois politicians were in Washington when Lincoln was assassinated, including the Governor, Richard J. Oglesby, a close friend of Lincoln. A few hours after Lincoln's death they met in Sen. Richard Yates' room at the National Hotel, to arrange a burial in Springfield, Illinois. Governor Oglesby was selected to confer with the Lincoln family on a burial place. Informal conferences were held on April 16. Mary Lincoln was not receiving visitors, but she preferred Chicago or the empty crypt in the U.S. Capitol that had been prepared for George Washington. She finally relented when her son Robert Todd Lincoln was able to persuade her to allow a Springfield burial, by promising to take Willie Lincoln's body along.

Springfield wanted a prominent burial location, a location that would draw visitors into downtown Springfield. A 6-acre (24,000 m^{2}) block, owned by the family of Col. Thomas Mather, was selected, a plot that could be seen from the major railroad line (Chicago and Alton Railroad), a plot in the center of Springfield on a hill. Fifty thousand dollars were donated for the purchase and the work of constructing a temporary vault started immediately.

The vault was designed to be a resting place for the remains until a grand monument could be erected. By men working night and day, through sunshine and rain, it was ready for use on May 24 (the day of the burial), although the work was not quite completed on the outside.

The Mather Block of land was later used as the site of the Illinois State Capitol building.

=== Mary Lincoln's choice: Oak Ridge Cemetery ===
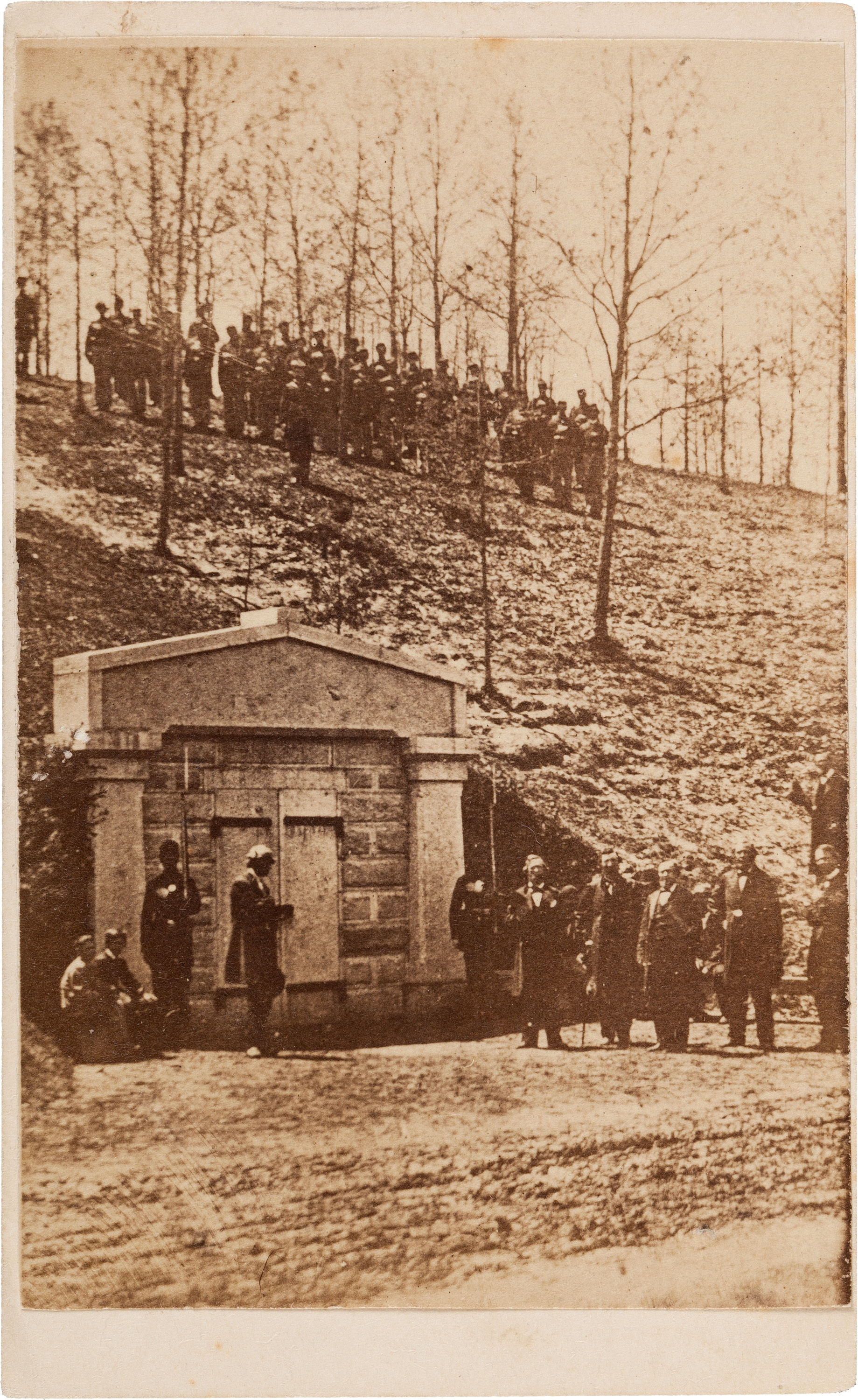
Oak Ridge receiving vault

Mary Lincoln however recalled that Lincoln once had said that he wanted a quiet place for his burial at Oak Ridge (said to her on May 24, 1860, when Lincoln, then running for president, and Mary attended the dedication of Oak Ridge, a rural quiet cemetery, two miles (3.2 km) from the heart of Springfield). On April 28 Mary sent a message to Secretary of War Edwin M. Stanton, in which she stated that her decision was final, and that Lincoln's remains must be placed in the Oak Ridge Cemetery.

On April 29 another message followed: "arrangements for using the Mather vault must be changed." And on May 1 the message was: "the remains of the president should be placed in the vault of Oak Ridge and nowhere else." The Oak Ridge vault was readied but work on the Mather vault continued as a "contingency." On May 4th President Lincoln’s remains would be taken from the capitol to Oak Ridge in a funeral parade, with the hearse being provided by the City of St. Louis, Missouri, followed by the presidents horse then the honor guard of units that were assigned to Springfield, with the 24th Michigan Infantry Regiment of the Iron Brigade taking the lead of the honor guard.

The Michiganders had been assigned to Springfield in February, having been in the Army of the Potomac from the Fredericksburg Campaign to the Siege of Petersburg. It had the unfortunate distinction of being the unit that had the largest casualty rate of the 400+ regiments that fought at the Battle of Gettysburg, tied alongside the 1st Minnesota Infantry Regiment with a 80% casualty rate. The Michiganders were selected as the main honor guard because they represented the troops that President Lincoln said “bore the battle”. Other units assigned to the funeral parade included the 14th Iowa Infantry Regiment, who were veterans of many battles in the Western Theater, and newer units in the 146th Illinois Infantry Regiment and the 42nd Wisconsin Infantry Regiment.

== Attempted theft and movement of remains ==
=== Attempted theft ===
When the tomb was completed in 1874, Lincoln's coffin was placed in a white marble sarcophagus in a burial room behind a steel gate locked with a padlock. In November 1876, Chicago counterfeiter James "Big Jim" Kennally planned to steal Lincoln's body and hold it in exchange for a pardon for his engraver (who was serving a ten-year sentence at Illinois State Penitentiary) and $200,000 (equivalent to $6,046,875 in 2025). The plot failed when two men recruited to assist turned out to be paid government informants, and the men sent to get the body did not plan for how to remove the quarter-ton cedar-and-lead coffin from the grounds.

On November 13, 1876, tomb custodian John Carroll Power and a group of trusted confidants moved the coffin from its room to a secret location in the basement of the tomb. Finding the ground waterlogged, they temporarily set the coffin on the ground and disguised it under a wood pile. Moving the coffin proved difficult; it weighed some 400–500 pounds (180–230 kilograms) and Power and the members of the Monument Association were mostly in their 60s, the youngest was 56. They were relieved to find that the seals on the coffin were intact and that Lincoln's remains had not been disturbed.

The following July, Kennally or some other member of the conspiracy asked Power to bury the coffin. He said that the unventilated basement was almost impossible to enter in the summer weather and also moving the heavy coffin had been brutally hard on himself and the other aging Monument Association members. Power, who had recently celebrated his 70th birthday, said that he suffered from crippling pain for months afterward and had no desire to do it again. The coffin therefore sat in the basement for another year.

A group of men in their 30s were hired to move the coffin and on November 18, 1878, the coffin was moved and reburied in a shallow grave on the far end of the labyrinth. After receiving anonymous threats in the mail, the coffin was dug up two days later to make sure it was still there.

In 1880, Power and his associates formed the "Lincoln Guard of Honor" to serve as the custodians of Lincoln's remains. Other than its members, only Robert Todd Lincoln knew of this organization. In 1882, after Mary Todd Lincoln died, Robert instructed the Guard of Honor to bury his mother's coffin wherever they kept his father's. Both coffins remained in the basement until 1887, when they were encased in a brick vault, at which time Lincoln's coffin was opened to verify his remains were still there.

=== Tomb reconstruction and exhumation ===
The original tomb, built on unsuitable soil, was in constant need of repair. In 1900, a complete reconstruction was undertaken, Lincoln's remains were exhumed, and the coffin was placed back in the white marble sarcophagus. On April 25, 1901, upon completion of the reconstruction, Robert Todd Lincoln visited the tomb. He was unhappy with the disposition of his father's remains and decided that it was necessary to build a permanent crypt for his father. Lincoln's coffin would be placed in a steel cage 10 feet (3.0 m) deep and encased in concrete in the floor of the tomb. On September 26, 1901, Lincoln's body was exhumed so that it could be re-interred in the newly built crypt. Several of the 23 people present feared that his body might have been stolen in the intervening years, so they decided to open the coffin and check.

A harsh choking smell arose when the casket was opened. Lincoln was perfectly recognizable, more than thirty years after his death. His face was a gold color from unhealed bruises, a result of contrecoup (injury on the opposite side of the head from point of impact) caused by the gunshot wound, which shattered the bones in his face and damaged the tissue. His hair, beard and mole were all perfectly preserved although his eyebrows were gone. His suit was covered with a yellow mold and his gloves had rotted on his hands. On his chest, they could see some bits of red fabric—remnants of the American flag with which he was buried, which had by then disintegrated:

- One of, if not, the last living persons to see the body, a youth of 14 at the time, was Fleetwood Lindley (1887–1963), who died on February 1, 1963. Three days before he died, the 75 year old Lindley was interviewed and confirmed his observations.
- Another man, George Cashman (1897–1983), claimed to be the last living person to have viewed the remains of Abraham Lincoln. In the last years of his life, Cashman was the curator of the National Landmark in Springfield called "Lincoln's Tomb" from 1951 to 1975. He particularly enjoyed relating his story to the more than one million visitors to the site each year. Cashman died in 1983. His claim concerning the viewing of Abraham Lincoln's remains was later refuted when his wife, Dorothy M. Cashman, wrote a pamphlet titled "The Lincoln Tomb." On page 14, Mrs. Cashman wrote, "At the time of his death in 1963 Fleetwood Lindley was the last living person to have looked upon Mr. Lincoln's face."

=== Second tomb reconstruction ===
A second, major reconstruction of the tomb was undertaken in 1930–31. Much deterioration had occurred due to poor construction during the 1900–1901 reconstruction. During the second reconstruction, the entrance to the tomb was reconfigured to better accommodate visitors and the original, white marble sarcophagus was replaced with the red granite marker in front of the place where Lincoln is interred. Souvenir hunters destroyed the original sarcophagus, which was placed outside the tomb during reconstruction. The tomb was rededicated with President Herbert Hoover as the main speaker on June 17, 1931.

=== Other movements ===
Lincoln's coffin has been moved 17 times and the coffin opened 5 times. The semi-circular Catacomb (or Burial Chamber) is at the north side of the base of the Lincoln Monument; on the south side (entrance) is Memorial Hall (or the Rotunda). Since the second reconstruction (1930–31) connecting corridors lead into the Burial Chamber.

Coffin placed	Remarks	Coffin opened
May 4, 1865	Coffin placed in Receiving Vault, Oak Ridge Cemetery, Springfield, Ill.	Yes
December 21, 1865	Coffin placed in nearby specially built Temporary Vault, Oak Ridge Cemetery.	Yes
September 19, 1871	Coffin placed in Lincoln Tomb (still under construction then), in temporary crypt in south wall Catacomb. The original walnut outer coffin is replaced by a new iron coffin.	Yes
October 9, 1874	Coffin placed in (white marble) sarcophagus in Catacomb, Lincoln Tomb. It is found that the iron coffin is too large to fit into the sarcophagus, so it is replaced with a new red cedar coffin. Lincoln Tomb was dedicated Oct 15, 1874.	
November 7, 1876	Coffin partly lifted from sarcophagus during an attempted theft. The thieves only moved the coffin 18 inches [46 cm] when they were interrupted by police.	
November 9, 1876	Coffin replaced in sarcophagus, which was then closed and sealed.	
November 13, 1876	Coffin removed (daytime) to place near northwest wall Catacomb, to be transported later that day.	
November 13, 1876	Coffin removed (nighttime) to secret location (eastside Lincoln Tomb, inside, near the base of the obelisk).	
November 14, 1876	Coffin placed into wooden case at the secret location (eastside Lincoln Tomb, near the inside base of the obelisk).	
November 18, 1878	Coffin replaced to another secret location (northside Lincoln Tomb, near the inside base of the obelisk).	
November 20, 1878	Lincoln was exhumed and reburied at same secret location (northside Lincoln Tomb) in response to an anonymous threat, received by the caretaker of the tomb via a postcard. The coffin was untouched in the grave in which it was placed a mere two nights before.	
April 14, 1887	Coffin removed to Memorial Hall for identification.	Yes
April 14, 1887	Coffin placed in newly built vault beneath floor of the Catacomb, Lincoln Tomb. After the coffins (of Lincoln and his wife) were lowered into the vault, it was filled with cement nearly in a liquid state, which in a short time hardened as a solid mass of stone, more than four feet and a half in depth over the top of the coffins. Over that the tessellated marble floor was relaid, and the sarcophagus placed in the original position.	
March 10, 1900	Coffin removed to a temporary vault dug into the hillside behind the monument (i.e. a secret place a few yards northeast of Lincoln's Tomb) during tomb reconstruction, which started in 1899 and lasted 15 months.	
April 24, 1901	Coffin removed to reconstructed Lincoln Tomb.	
July 10, 1901	Coffin temporarily removed to empty crypt in the south wall of the Catacomb in order to build a permanent crypt under the floor of the Catacomb.	
September 26, 1901	Coffin brought to and opened in Memorial Hall, for identification	Yes
September 26, 1901	Coffin permanently placed in a steel cage, and embedded in concrete, 10 feet (3.0 m) deep under the floor of the Catacomb. The sarcophagus in front of the place where Lincoln is finally interred is empty. The original white marble sarcophagus was replaced in 1931 by the present red granite marker. It was not necessary to move Lincoln's body in the 1931 construction, because the cenotaph was placed 6 feet (1.8 m) and thirty inches (76 cm) south from the inside north wall, with foundation as low as that of Lincoln's grave.	

== Movements of remains of other family members ==
On May 4, 1865, (Lincoln's arrival at Oak Ridge Cemetery, nineteen days after his death) another coffin, containing the body of Lincoln's son Willie (1850–1862) was placed with Lincoln's in the Receiving Vault. Willie had been initially interred in the Carroll family tomb at the Oak Hill Cemetery in Georgetown. His remains accompanied those of his father on the funeral train to Springfield.

On December 21, 1865, the two caskets were moved to the temporary vault, halfway up the hillside, where the Lincoln Tomb was in construction at the top of the hill. The body of Lincoln's son Edward "Eddie" Baker Lincoln (three years, ten months) was already placed there on December 13, 1865. Eddie, born March 10, 1846, died February 1, 1850, and was first buried at the Hutchinson Cemetery in Springfield.

The three bodies rested in the temporary vault while the Lincoln tomb was being built. The three bodies were moved to the catacomb of the tomb on September 19, 1871. They were not the first. Two months earlier (on July 17, 1871) it was Lincoln's son Thomas ("Tad") Lincoln, born April 4, 1853, who was the first Lincoln placed into a crypt in the Lincoln Tomb. Tad died on July 15, 1871, in Chicago, Illinois, aged eighteen.

Lincoln's wife, Mary Todd Lincoln (December 13, 1818 – July 16, 1882) was buried July 19, 1882, in one of the family crypts in the Lincoln Tomb. In the night of July 21, 1882, Mary Todd's casket was secretly taken from the crypt and at Robert Todd Lincoln's (her eldest son) request, buried alongside the President. On April 14, 1887, both caskets were moved to Memorial Hall.

Lincoln's teenage grandson and namesake, Abraham Lincoln II ("Jack"), born August 14, 1873, died March 5, 1890, in London and was temporarily buried in Kensal Green Cemetery, London, until his father returned to the U.S. with his body and on November 8, 1890, was placed in one of the crypts in the Lincoln Tomb. His body remained in the tomb until May 27, 1930, when he was re-interred at the family plot of his father, Robert Todd Lincoln (August 1, 1843, to July 25, 1926), at Arlington National Cemetery in Virginia.

During the first Lincoln Tomb reconstruction (1900–1901), the Lincoln family was disinterred and moved to the temporary vault northeast of the tomb. On April 24, 1901, the Lincoln family was removed from the temporary vault and placed back into the Lincoln Tomb.

While President Lincoln was finally at rest, the remainder of the Lincoln family was moved two more times. The coffins containing the bodies of Mary, Eddie, Willie, and Tad Lincoln were removed during the second tomb reconstruction (1930–1931) from their crypts and transported to the Oak Ridge mausoleum, located near the south gate of the cemetery. After the second reconstruction was completed, the bodies were returned to their crypts in June 1931.

== See also ==
- Chicago History Museum – holds clothing Lincoln wore the night he died, and the bed he died in.
- National Museum of Health and Medicine – On display are Lincoln's life mask, the bullet fired from the Derringer pistol used by John Wilkes Booth to assassinate the president, the probe used by the Army Surgeon General Joseph Barnes to locate the bullet, pieces of Lincoln's hair and skull, and the surgeon's shirt cuff, stained with Lincoln's blood.
- The Henry Ford – On display is the chair in which Lincoln was shot.
- Lincoln Memorial – The Lincoln Memorial on the National Mall in Washington, D.C.
- Abraham Lincoln Presidential Library and Museum - Library and museum in Springfield, Illinois.
- Studebaker National Museum – On display is the "Lincoln carriage, used by President Lincoln to take him and his wife on his final ride to Ford's Theater on April 14, 1865. This treasured artifact is a permanent part of the Studebaker National Museum's collection"
- List of Abraham Lincoln artifacts and relics
