= Camp Ford =

American Civil War POW camp in Texas

- Near Tyler, Texas
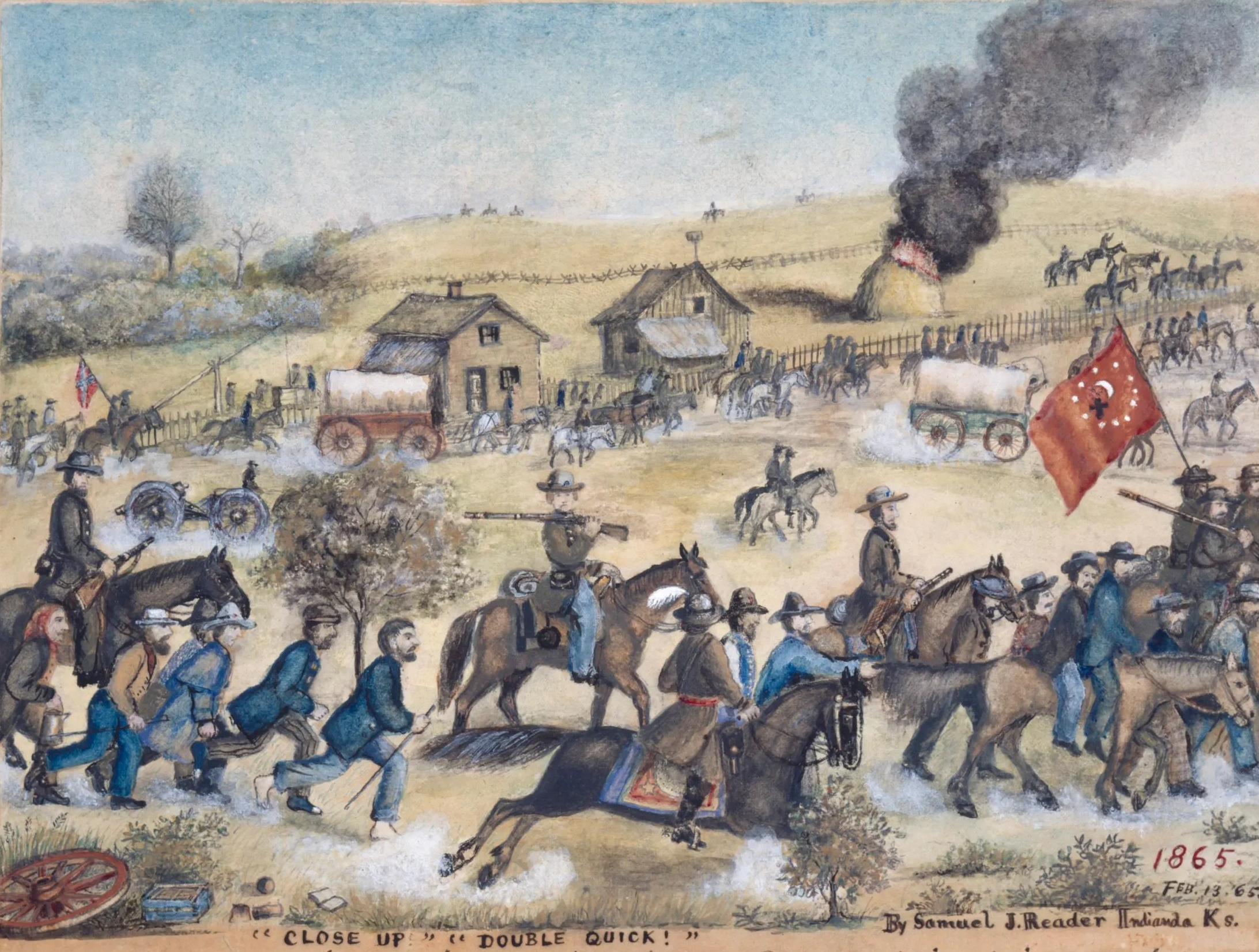
- The Price Raid by Samuel J. Reader shows Union prisoners on the way to Camp Ford in October 1864

Location
- Location of Camp Ford
- Coordinates: 32°23′44.13″N 95°16′7.28″W

Site history
- Built: 1862 (164 years ago)
- Built by: Confederate States Army
- In use: 1862–1865
- Events: American Civil War

Garrison information
- Past commanders: Col. R. R. Brown

Camp Ford was a prisoner-of-war camp near Tyler, Texas, during the American Civil War. It was the largest Confederate-run prison west of the Mississippi River.

== History ==
Camp Ford is not a battlefield memorial, it is the site of a prisoner-of-war (POW) camp where over 350 US Army personnel died of starvation, exposure, and disease. Their names are listed on unit honor rolls for units of Ohio and Pennsylvania infantry, among others. Established in the spring of 1862 as a training camp for new Confederate recruits, the camp was named for Col. John Salmon Ford, a Texas Ranger and the superintendent of conscripts for the State of Texas.

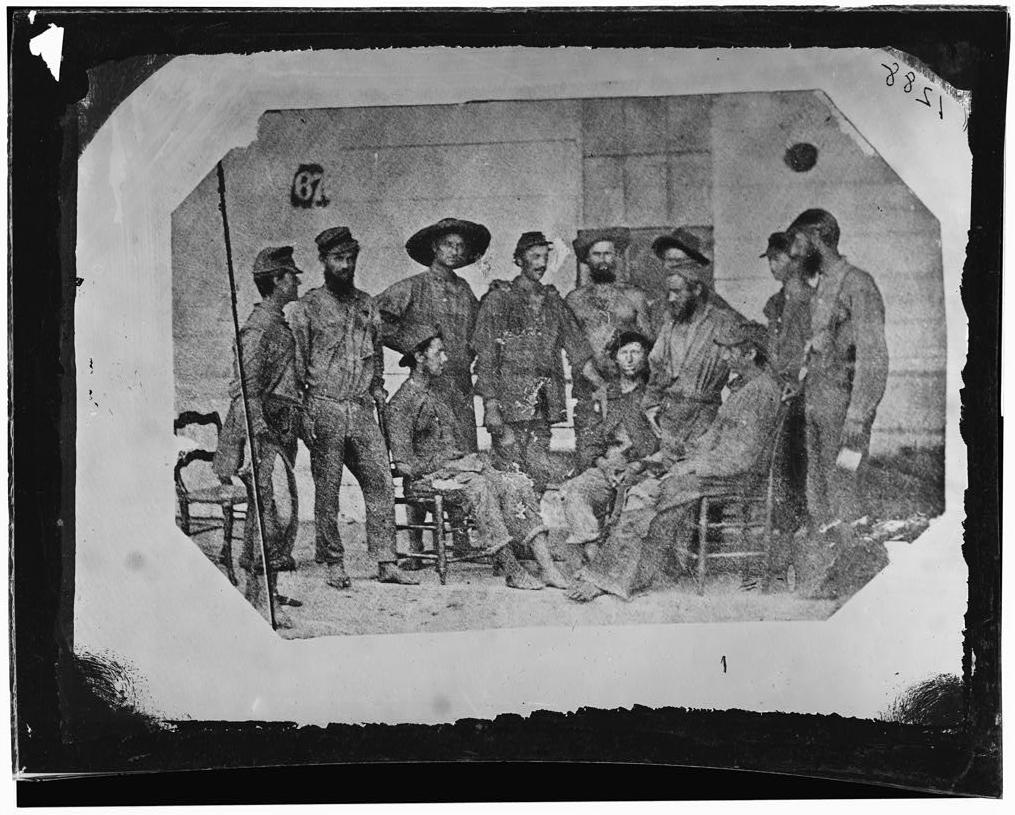
Non-commissioned Union Army officers from the 19th Iowa Infantry who were exchanged after being confined at Camp Ford

The first Union prisoners to arrive at Camp Ford in August 1863 included officers captured in Brashear City, Louisiana, in June, and included naval personnel captured when the Queen Of The West and Diana were seized by the Confederate Navy. The captives were initially held in the open, but a panic ensued in November 1863 when 800 new prisoners threatened a mass breakout. A military stockade enclosing 4 acres (16,000 m^{2}) was soon erected.

With over 2,000 new prisoners taken in Louisiana on April 8 and 9, 1864, at the battles of Mansfield, and Pleasant Hill, the stockade was quadrupled in size. Among those imprisoned there following these battles were 17 members of the 47th Pennsylvania Infantry Regiment, the only regiment from the Commonwealth of Pennsylvania to fight in the Union's 1864 Red River Campaign across Louisiana and the only regiment from the Keystone State to have men imprisoned at Camp Ford. With more prisoners captured in Arkansas, the prison's population peaked at about 5,000 in July 1864. The population was reduced by exchanges in July and October 1864, and again in February 1865. The last 1,761 prisoners were exchanged on May 22, 1865.

== Camp layout ==
Sketches of Camp Ford drawn by James S. McClain between May 3, 1864, and May 27, 1865

Multiple Union soldiers who were held as POWs at Camp Ford documented their confinement through diaries kept during their time there. One such diary was created by James S. McClain, who had been captured on May 3, 1864, and was held until the final exchange of prisoners on May 27, 1865. Included in McClain's documentation were sketches of various buildings and other aspects of the camp.

== Camp today ==
The original site of the camp stockade is now a public historic park, owned by Smith County, Texas, and managed by the Smith County Historical Society, a 501(c)(3) nonprofit organization founded in 1959 by individuals and business firms dedicated to discovering, collecting, and preserving data, records, and other items relating to the history of Smith County. The park contains a kiosk, paved trail, interpretive signage, a cabin reconstruction, and a picnic area. The camp is located on US Highway 271, 0.7 miles north of Loop 323 in Tyler, Texas. The geographical coordinates are: 32°23'44.13"N - 95°16'7.28"W. The property is exempt from county property taxation.
