= Timeline of Chicago history =

The following is a timeline of the history of the city of Chicago, Illinois, United States.

== Before the 19th century ==
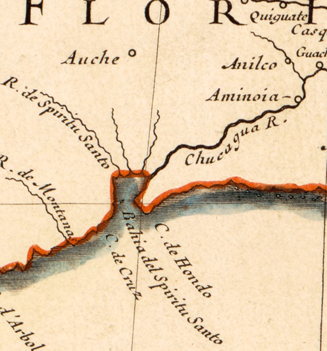
As interpreted from the 1670 translation of the de Soto narrative into French by Pierre Richelet, the Chucagua River, was believed to be the Mississippi. La Salle named Checagou, the transliterated from Spanish, as the gateway to the River of de Soto.

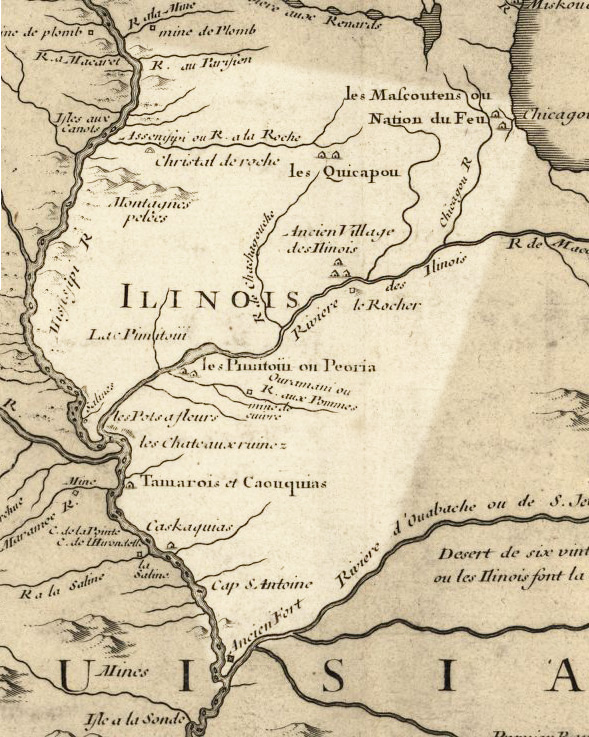
Site of Chicagou on the lake, in Guillaume de L'Isle's map (Paris, 1718)

- 1200: The Council of Three Fires, consisting of the Ojibwe, Odawa and Potawatomi people, occupied what would become Chicago since at least the 13th century.
- 1673: French-Canadian explorers Jacques Marquette and Louis Jolliet, on their way to Québec, pass through the area that will become Chicago.
- 1677: Father Claude Allouez arrived to try to convert the natives to Christianity.
- 1682: French explorer René Robert Cavelier, Sieur de la Salle, passes through Chicago en route to the mouth of the Mississippi River.
- 1687: The first known written reference to what is now known as Chicago came from Robert LaSalle's memoir, referencing the site as "Checagou", derived from a French rendering of the Miami-Illinois word "shikaakwa", referring to the wild leek, garlic and onion that grew abundantly in the area.
- 1696: Jesuit missionary Francois Pinet founds the Mission of the Guardian Angel. It is abandoned four years later.
- 1705: Conflicts develop between French traders and the Meskwaki.
- 1719: The Comanche Indian Tribe settle in the Great Plains and in the Midwest of the United States.
- 1754: The Illinois Country becomes part of New France, days later The French and Indian War begins with the war against the British.
- 1763: The Illinois Country falls to British Troops after the defeat of New France.
- 1775: The Revolutionary War begins with America declaring independence from Britain.
- 1778: The Illinois Campaign is born under the command of George Rogers Clark to lead the fight against major British outposts scattered across the country.
- 1780s: Jean Baptiste Point du Sable establishes Chicago's first permanent settlement near the mouth of the Chicago River.
- 1795: Six square miles (16 km^{2}) of land at the mouth of the Chicago River are reserved by the Treaty of Greenville for use by the United States.
- 1796: Kitihawa, du Sable's Potawatomi wife, delivers Eulalia Point du Sable, Chicago's first recorded birth.

== 19th century ==
=== 1800s–1840s ===
- 1803: The United States Army orders the construction of Fort Dearborn by Major John Whistler. It is built near the mouth of the Chicago River.
- 1812
  - June 17, Jean La Lime is killed by John Kinzie, making him the first recorded murder victim in Chicago.
  - August 15, the Battle of Fort Dearborn.
- 1816: The Treaty of St. Louis is signed in St. Louis, Missouri. Ft. Dearborn is rebuilt.
- 1818: December 3, Illinois joins the Union and becomes a state.

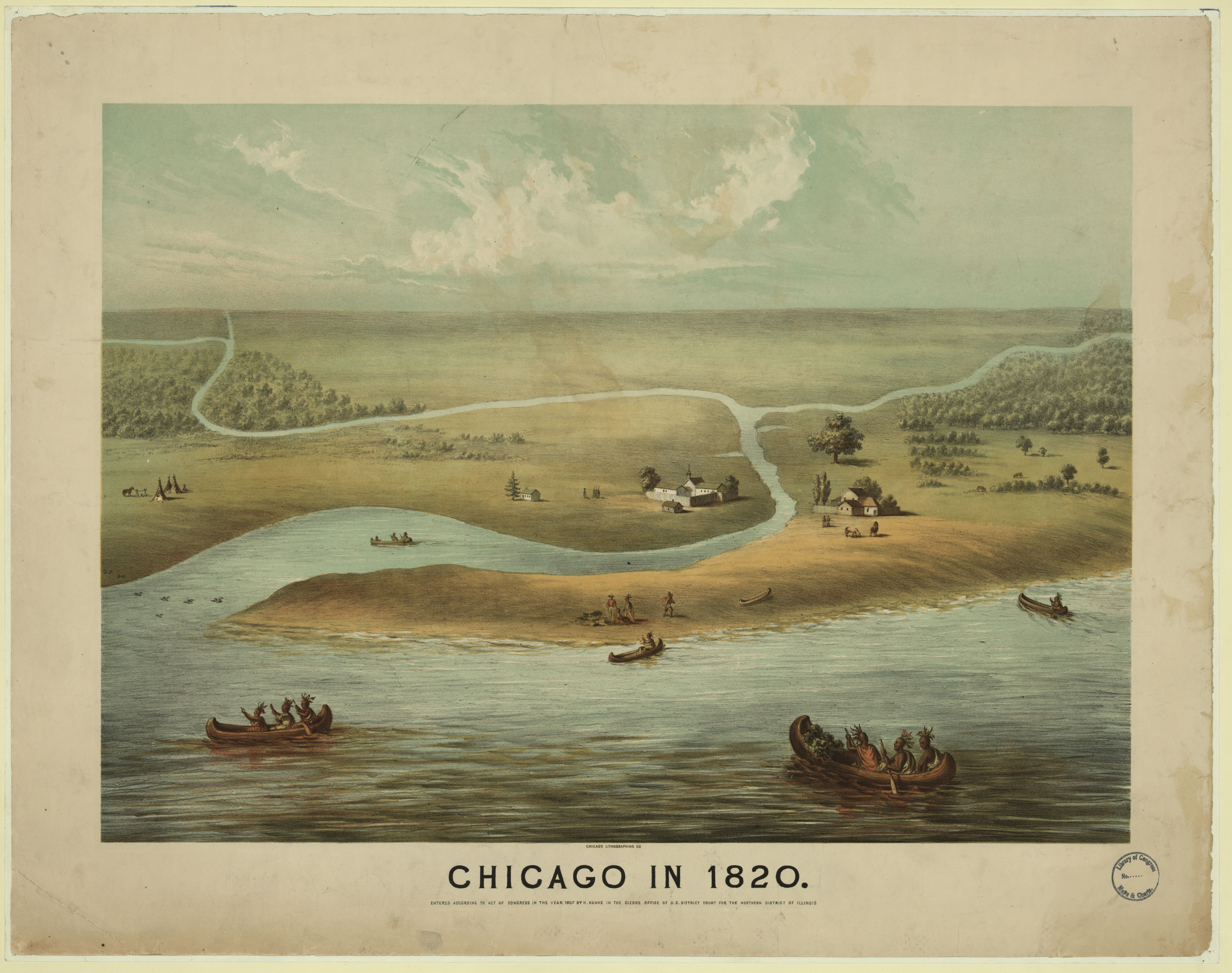
1820 Chicago

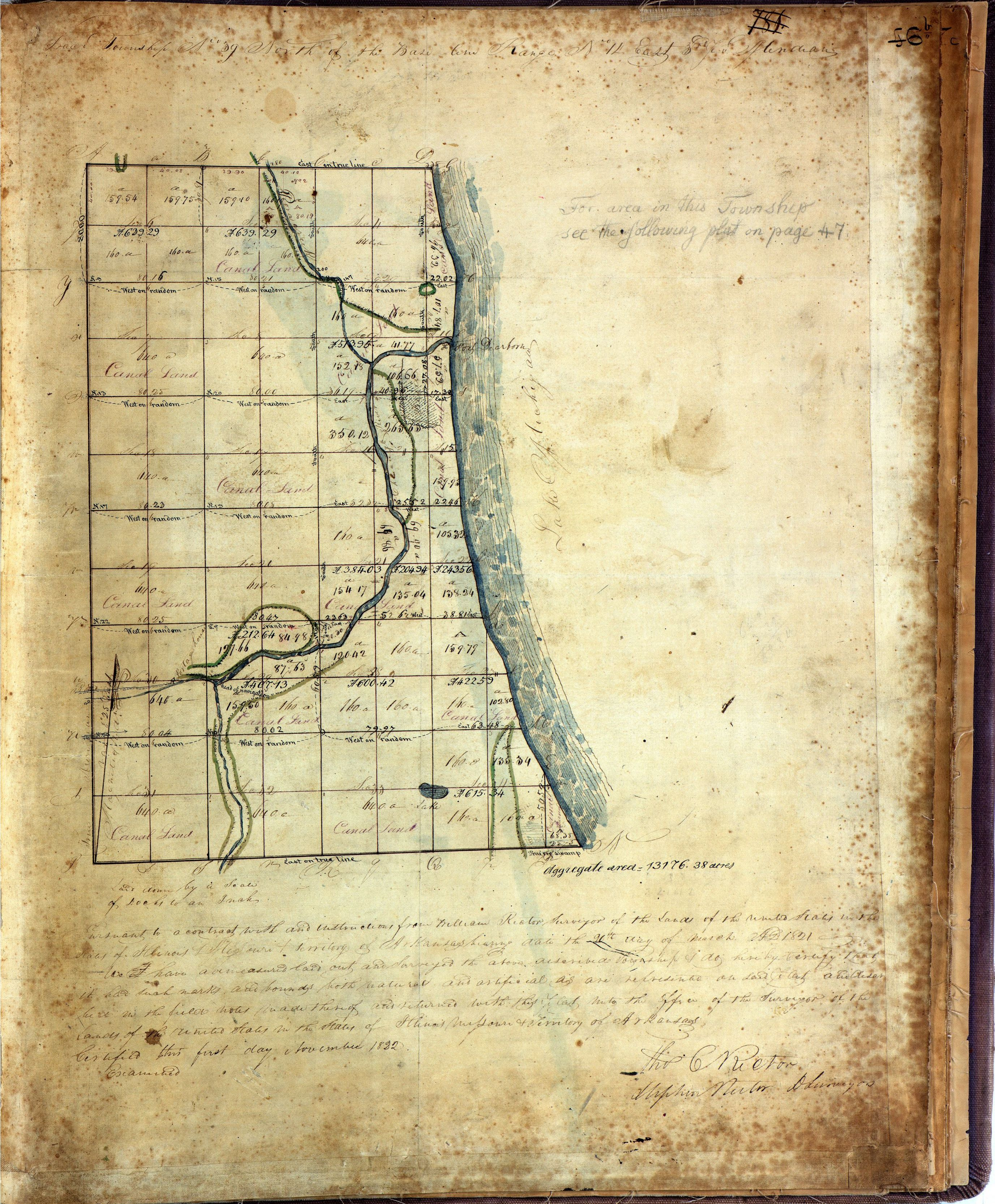
1821 Survey of Chicago

- 1821: 1821 Treaty of Chicago
- 1830
  - August 4, Chicago is surveyed and platted for the first time by James Thompson.
  - Population: "Less than 100".
- 1833
  - 1833 Treaty of Chicago
  - Chicago incorporated as a town.
  - The Noble-Seymour-Crippen House in Norwood Park, Chicago was built (annexed to Chicago in 1893).
  - April, Saint Mary of the Assumption Catholic Church was founded, later Old St. Mary's.
  - June 26, First Presbyterian Church (Chicago) founded.
- 1835
  - August 31, about 800 Potawatomi men gathered for a war dance in Chicago before being removed to west of the Mississippi River.
- 1836
  - The Henry B. Clarke House was built.
- 1837
  - Chicago incorporated as a city.
  - Chicago receives its first charter.
  - first mayoral election is held
  - Rush Medical College is founded two days before the city was chartered. It is the first medical school in the state of Illinois which is still operating.
  - The remaining 450 Potawatomi left Chicago.
- 1840
  - July 10, Chicago's first legally executed criminal, John Stone was hanged for rape and murder.
  - Population: 4,470.
- 1841
  - Union Ridge Cemetery in Norwood Park, Chicago (annexed to Chicago in 1893) was established.
- 1843: Chicago's first cemetery, Chicago City Cemetery, was established in Lincoln Park.
- 1844: Lake Park designated.
- 1847
  - June 10, The first issue of the Chicago Tribune is published.
  - November 3, Kehilath Anshe Ma'arav, the oldest Jewish congregation in Chicago, was founded.
- 1848
  - Chicago Board of Trade opens on April 3 by 82 local businessmen.
  - Illinois and Michigan Canal opens and traffic begins moving faster.
  - Galena and Chicago Union Railroad enters operation becoming the first railroad in Chicago
- 1849
  - Wauconda is founded.

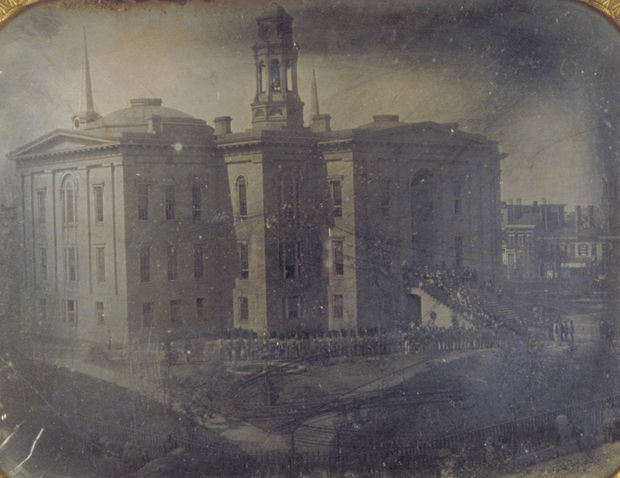
First built in 1835, an 1855 daguerreotype attributed to Alexander Hesler of the Cook County Court House and City Hall, later destroyed in the 1871 fire. It is believed to be the oldest surviving architectural photograph taken in Chicago.

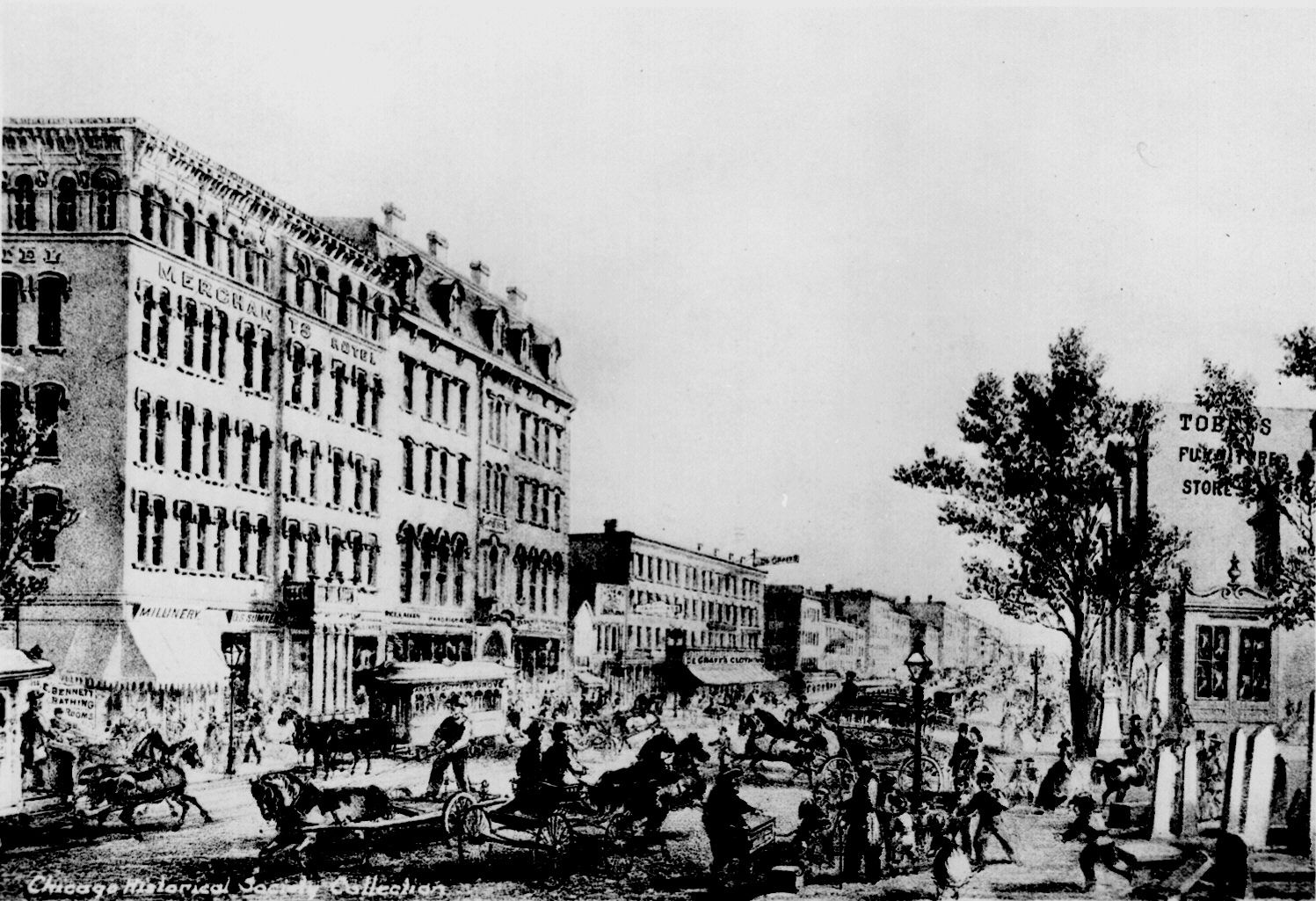
Merchants' Hotel on left, looking North from State and Washington Streets, before 1868

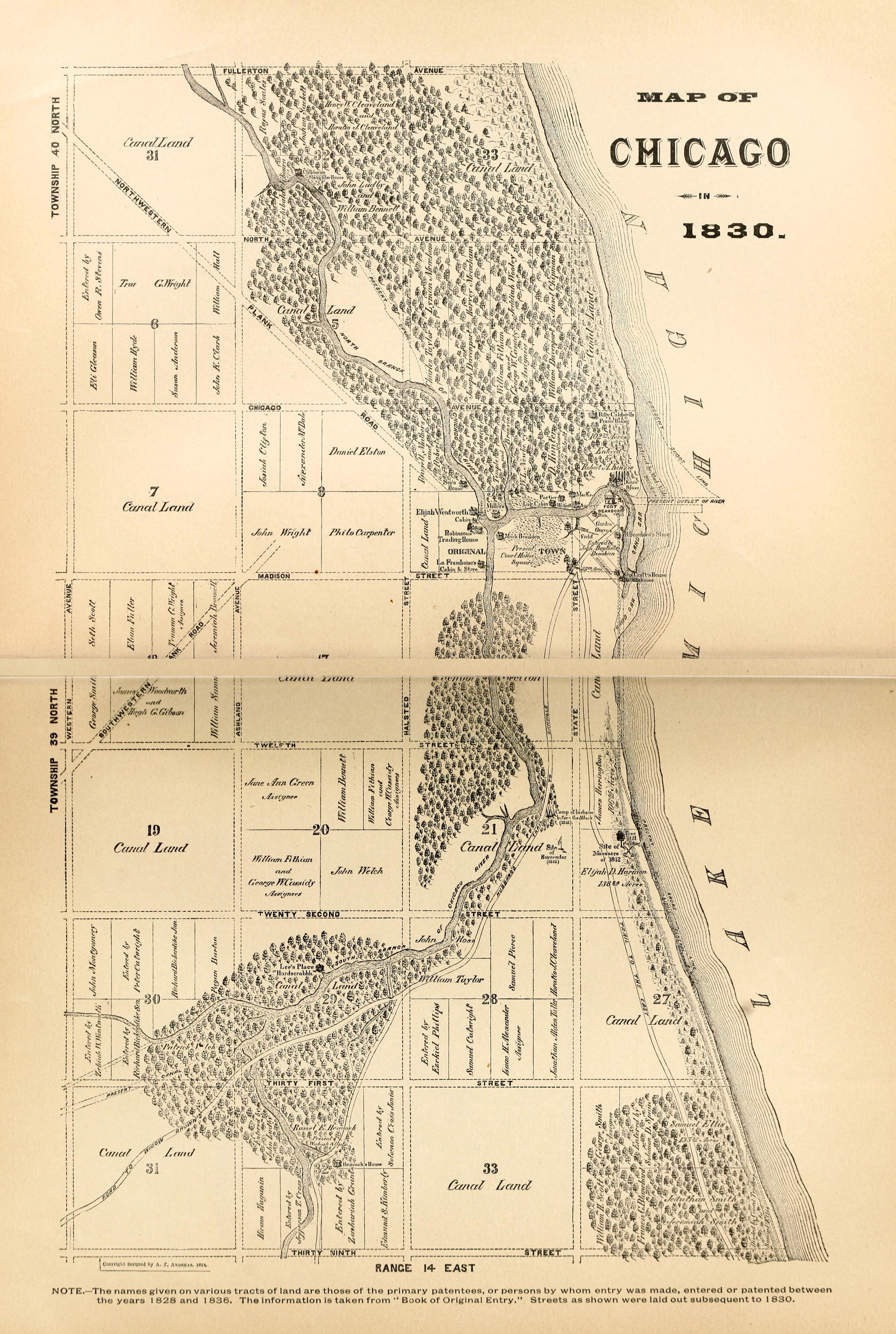
Chicago in 1830, as depicted in 1884

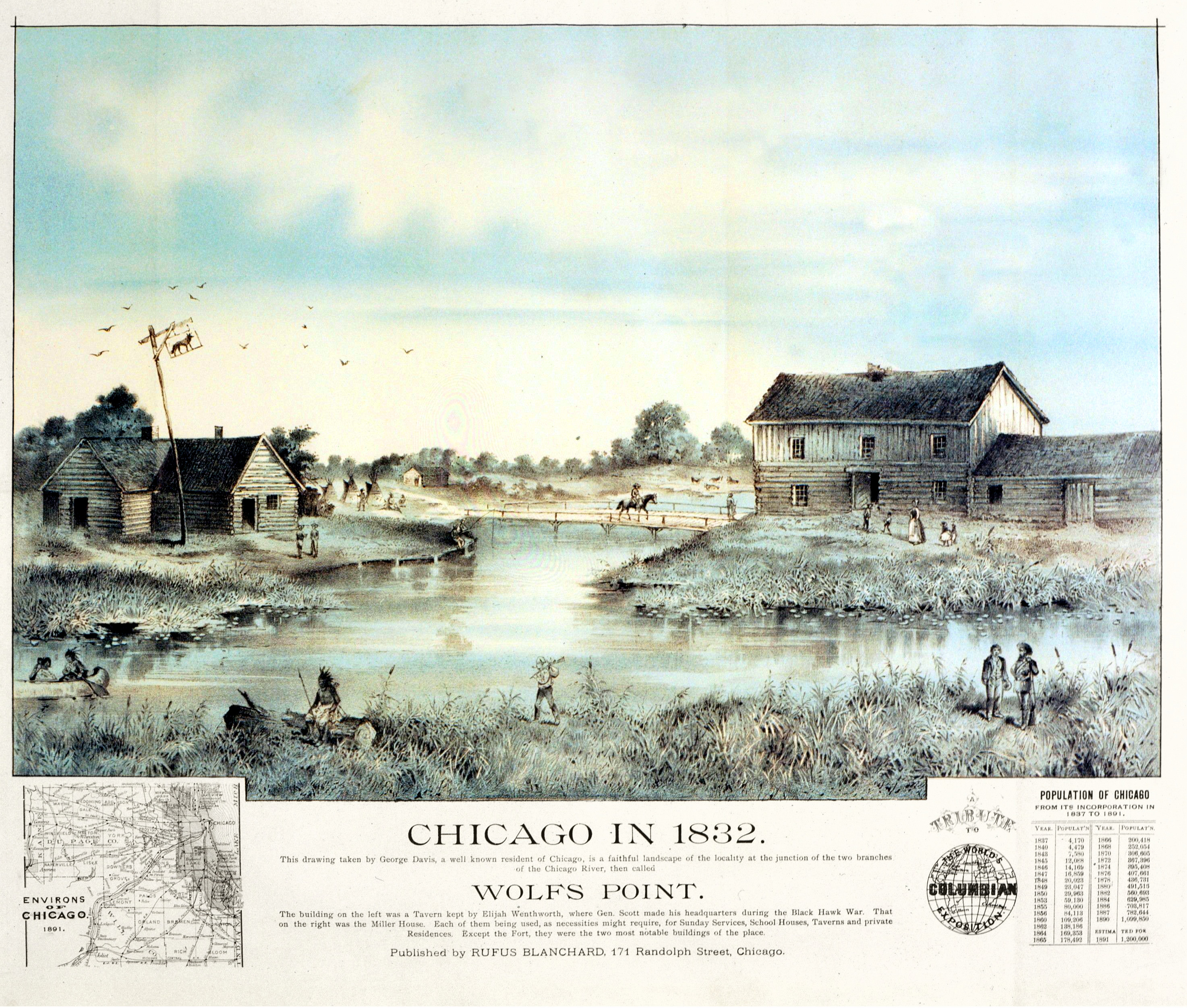
Chicago in 1832, as depicted in 1892

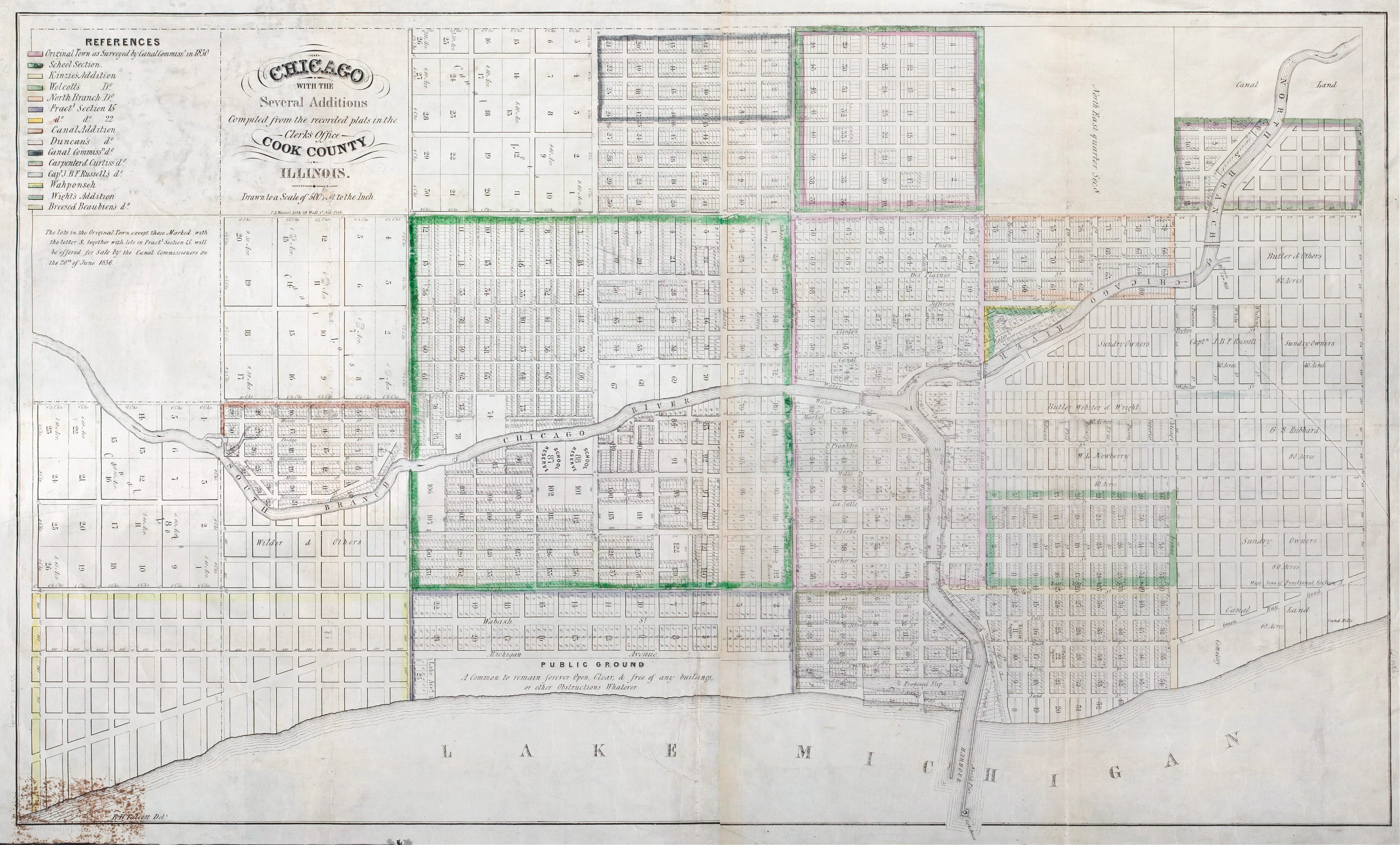
Chicago in 1836

1893 Bird's eye view of Chicago

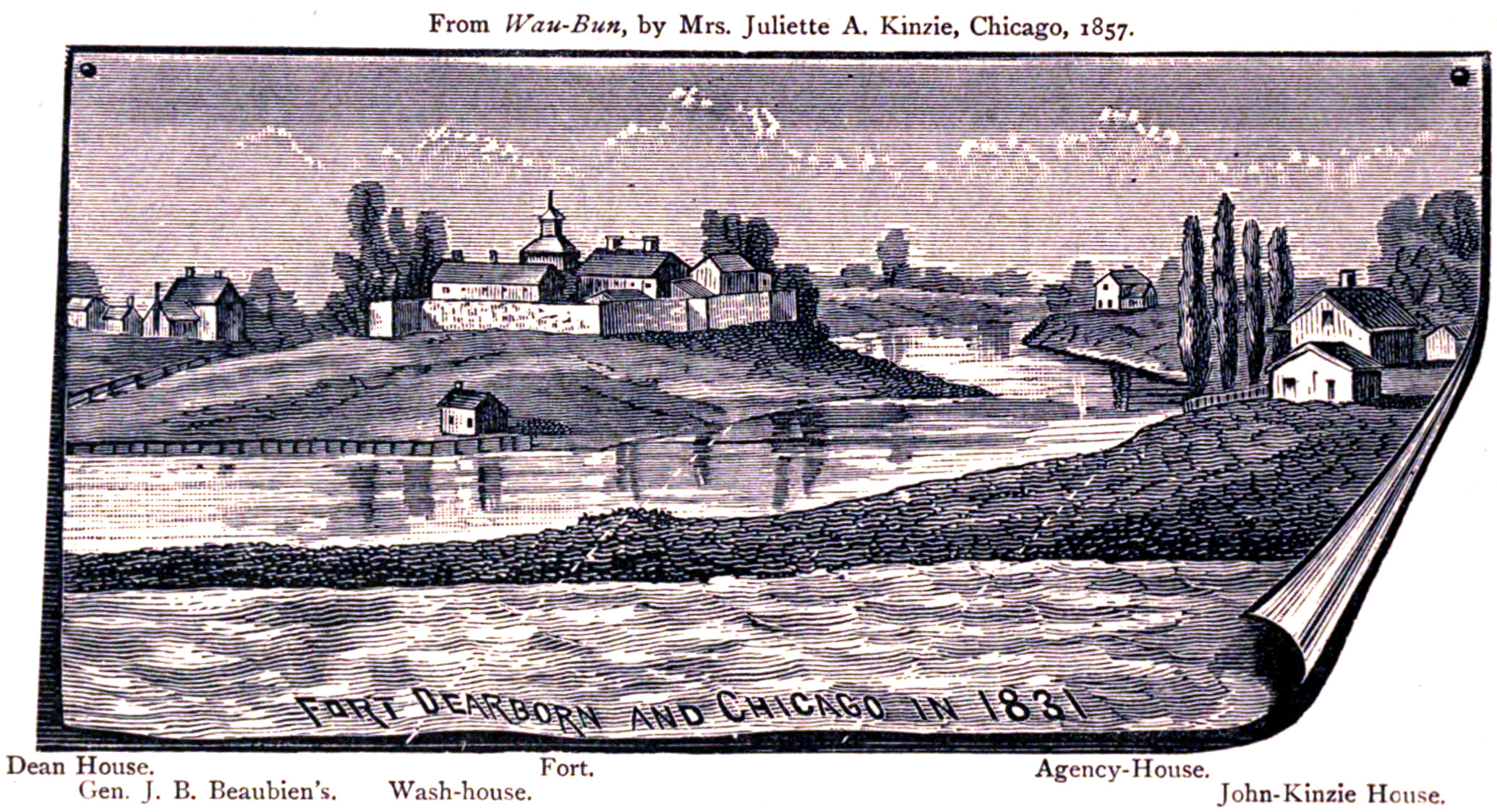
Fort Dearborn depicted as in 1831, sketched 1850s although the accuracy of the sketch was debated soon after it appeared.

=== 1850s–1890s ===
- 1850: Population: 29,963.
- 1851
  - Chicago's first institution of higher education, Northwestern University, is founded.
  - Jewish Graceland Cemetery, aka Hebrew Benevolent Society Cemetery, the oldest existing Jewish cemetery in Chicago, was founded.
  - The Cook County Poor Farm was founded.
- 1852: Mercy Hospital becomes the first hospital in Illinois.
- 1853
  - October: State Convention of the Colored Citizens held in city.
  - Union Park named.
  - Oak Woods Cemetery was founded.
- 1854
  - A cholera epidemic took the lives of 5.5% of the population of Chicago.
  - Cook County Cemetery at Dunning, Chicago's first major Potter's field, was founded near the Cook County Poor Farm in Dunning.
- 1855
  - Chicago Theological Seminary founded.
  - April 21, Lager Beer riot.
  - Population: 80,000.
- 1856: Chicago Historical Society founded.
- 1857
  - Iwan Ries & Co. Chicago's oldest family-owned business opens, still in operation today, the oldest family-owned tobacco shop.
  - Mathias A. Klein & Sons (Klein Tools Inc.), still family owned and run today by fifth and sixth generation Klein's.
  - Cook County Hospital opens.
  - Hyde Park House built.
- 1859
  - McCormick Theological Seminary relocated.
  - Rosehill Cemetery, Chicago's largest cemetery, was founded.
- 1860
  - May 16–18, 1860 Republican National Convention, the first United States presidential nominating convention to be held in Chicago. Illinois resident Abraham Lincoln is nominated for president, and goes on to win the 1860 United States presidential election.
  - September 8, the Lady Elgin Disaster.
  - Population: 112,172.
  - Daprato Statuary Company (Currently Daprato Rigali Studios) founded by the Daprato brothers, Italian immigrants from Barga.
  - Graceland Cemetery was founded.
- 1863
  - Saint Boniface Catholic Cemetery and Saint Henry Catholic Cemetery, the oldest existing Catholic cemeteries in Chicago, were founded.
- 1865
  - May 1, over 100,000 people attended the procession of the State funeral of Abraham Lincoln and the viewing at the Old Chicago Court House. On June 12, Chicago's Lake Park was re-named Lincoln Park in his honor.
  - 867 Confederate prisoners at Camp Douglas (Chicago) died, bringing the total death toll at the camp to 4,454. The majority of the Confederate prisoners were buried in a mass grave at Oak Woods Cemetery.
  - Corporal punishment was abandoned in schools.
  - Population: 178,492.
- 1866
  - School of the Art Institute of Chicago founded.
  - Chicago City Cemetery in Lincoln Park was permanently closed, and most of the bodies were moved to other cemeteries in the city.
- 1867
  - Construction began on the Water Tower designed by architect W. W. Boyington.
  - Chicago Academy of Music founded.
- 1868
  - Rand McNally is formed as a railway guide company.
  - Lincoln Park Zoo founded.

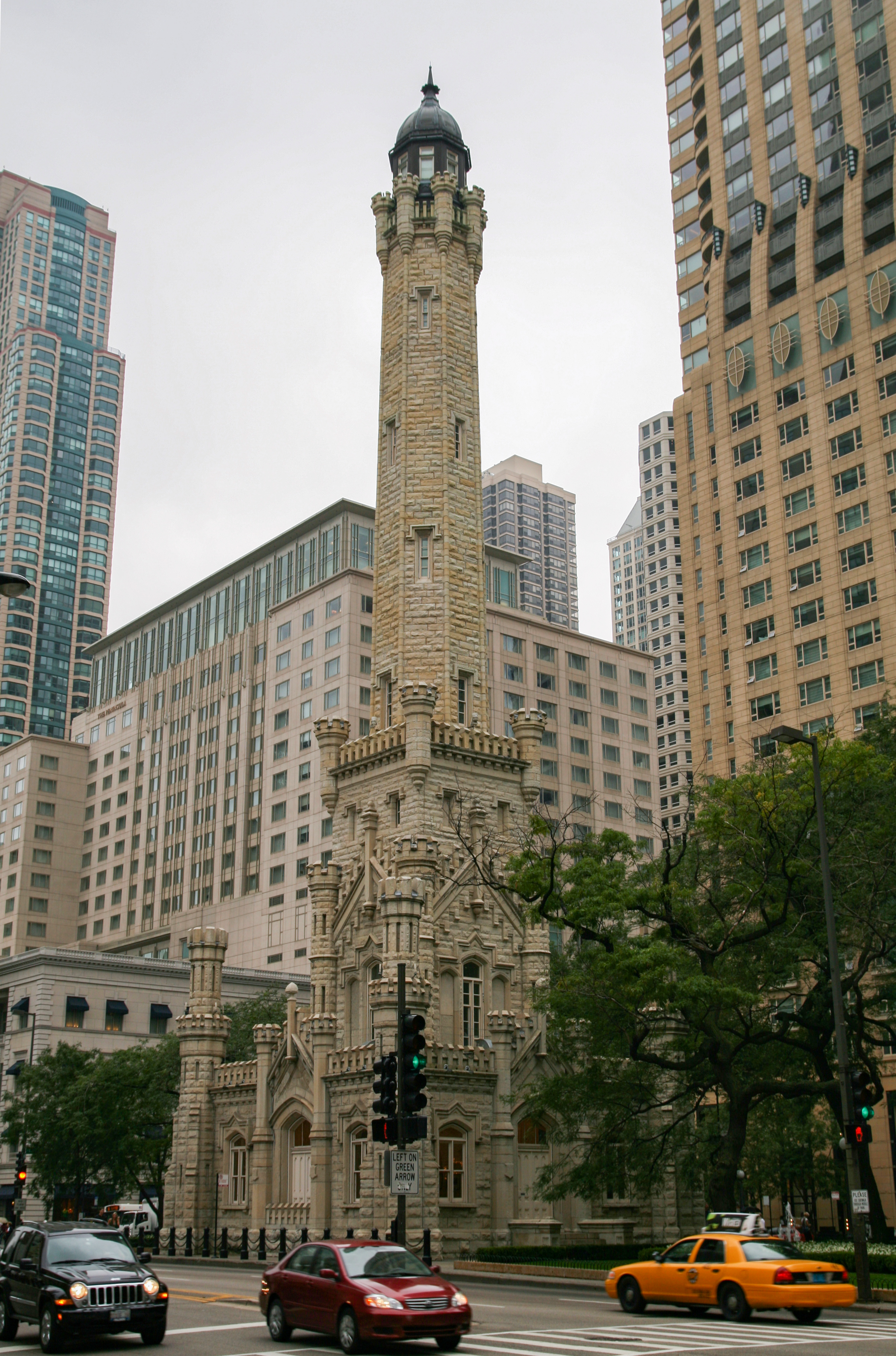
The Chicago Water Tower

- 1869
  - Chicago Water Tower built.
  - The first Illinois woman suffrage convention was held in Chicago
  - The Chicago Club is established.
  - Washington Square Park being developed.
- 1870
  - St. Ignatius College founded, later Loyola University
  - Population: 298,977.
- 1871
  - October 8 – 10, the Great Chicago Fire.
  - John Jones became the first African-American to hold elected office in Chicago.
- 1872
  - Montgomery Ward in business.
  - Establishment of the first Black fire company in the city.

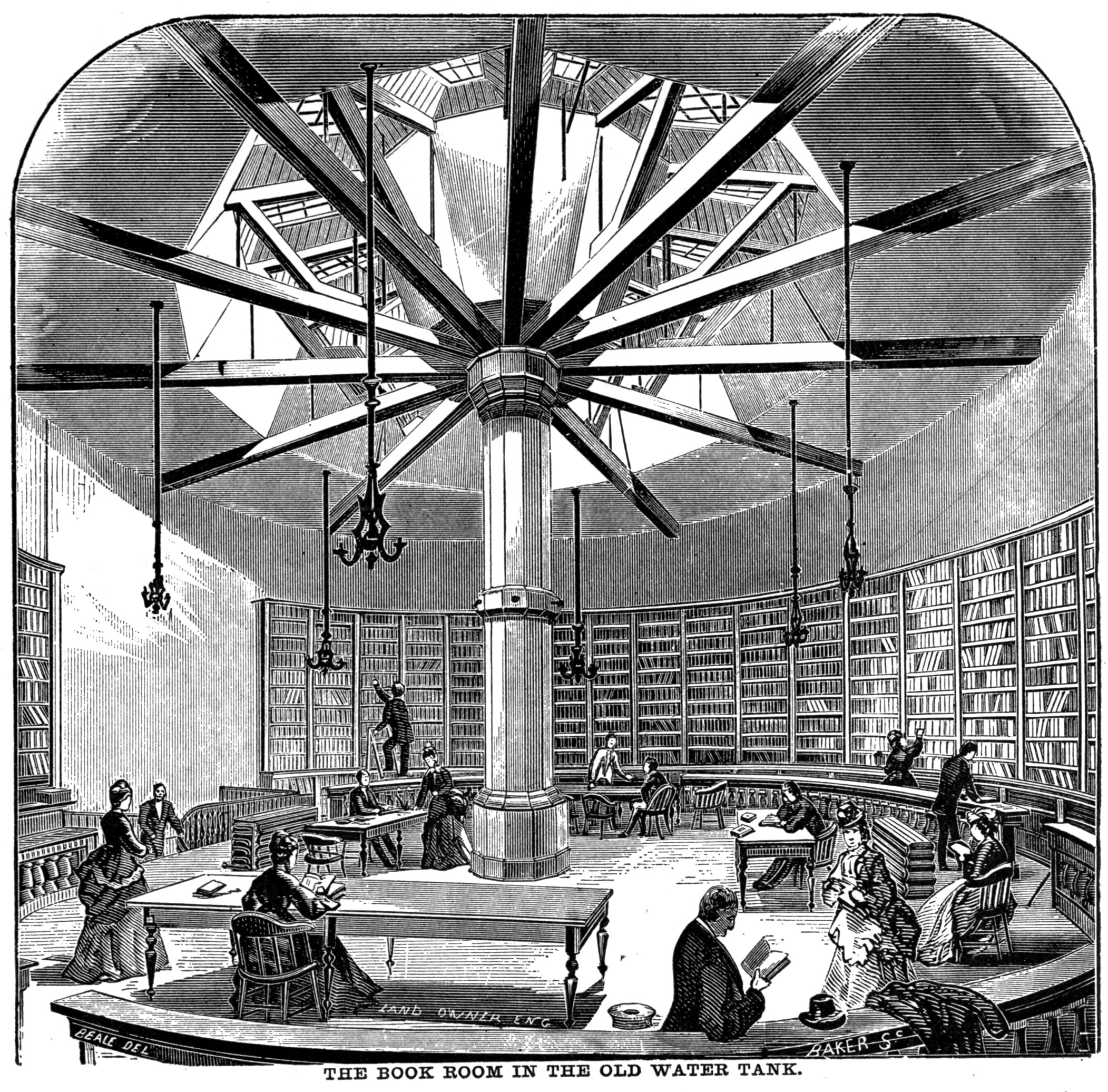
The original library, inside the old water tower on the site that is now the Rookery Building.

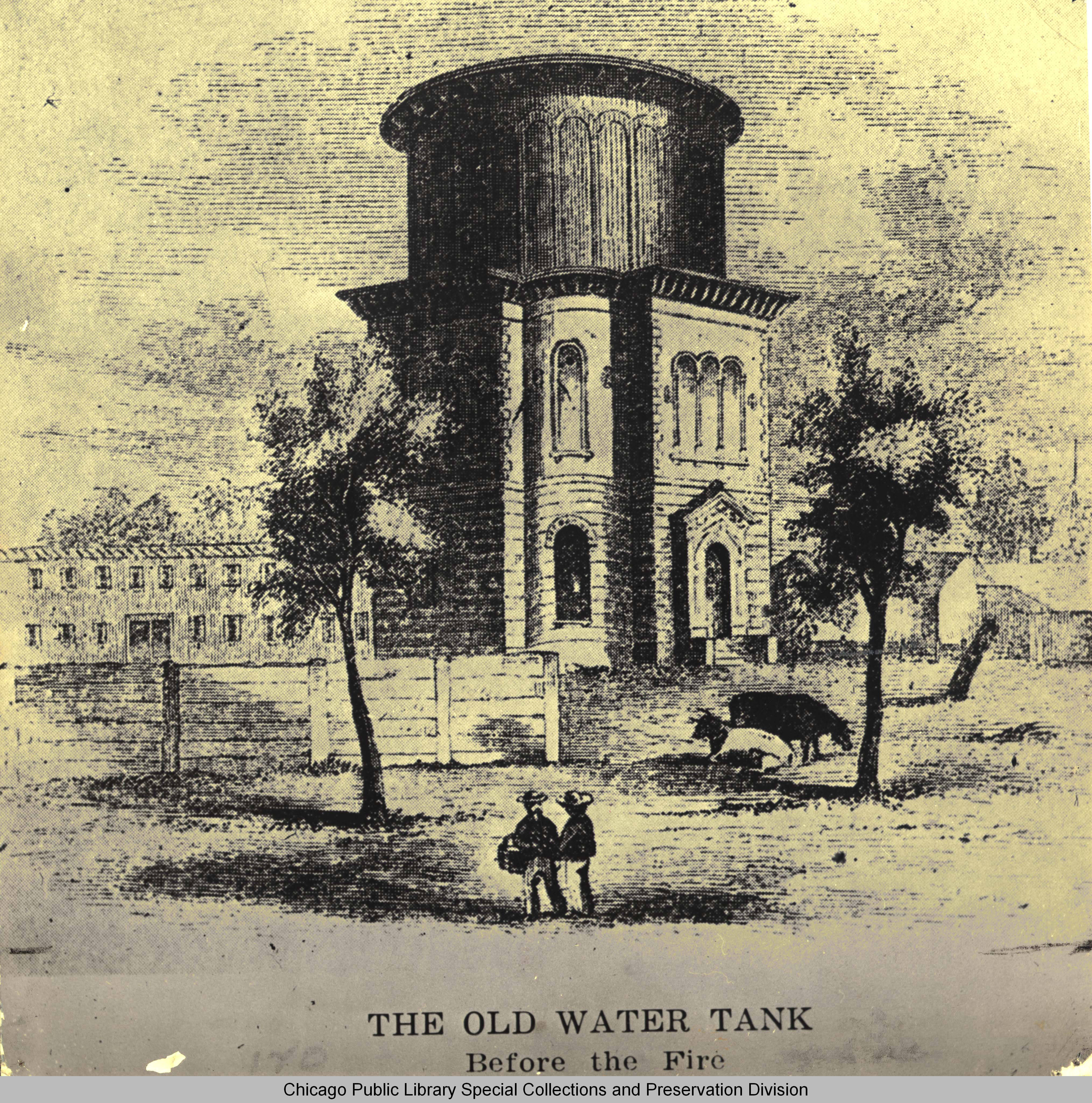
This former water tower was the site of the original public library, exterior view

- 1873: Chicago Public Library established.
- 1875: Holy Name Cathedral dedicated.
- 1877
  - Bohemian National Cemetery was founded.
  - Railroad strike.

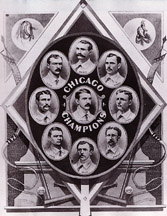
1876 Chicago White Stockings

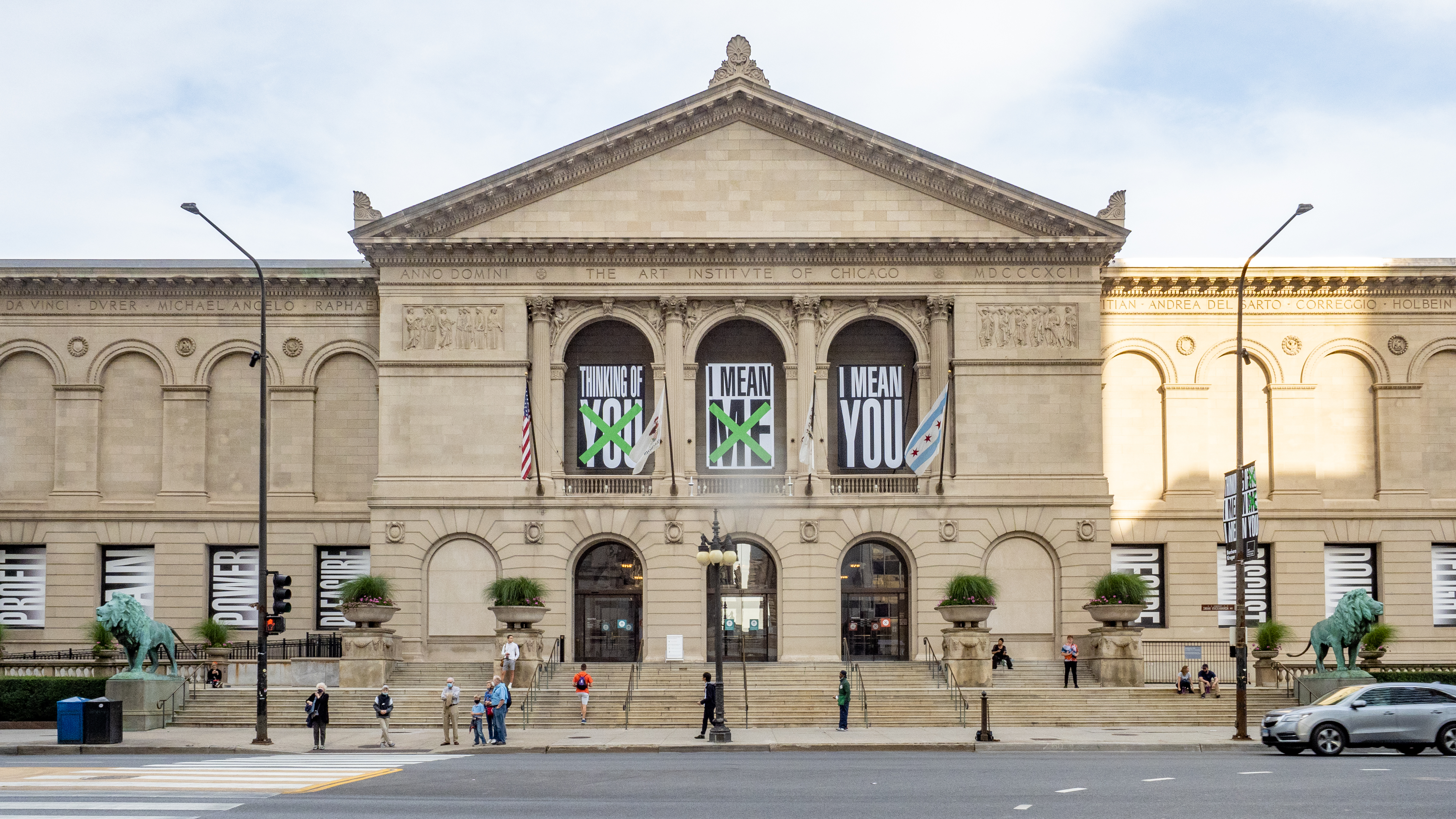
Art Institute of Chicago As seen from Michigan Ave

- 1878
  - Art Institute of Chicago established.
  - Conservator newspaper begins publication.
- 1879: Art Institute of Chicago founded.
- 1880
  - Polish National Alliance headquartered in city.
  - Population: 503,185.
- 1881
  - Unsightly beggar ordinance effected.
  - A smallpox epidemic killed around 2,500 people.

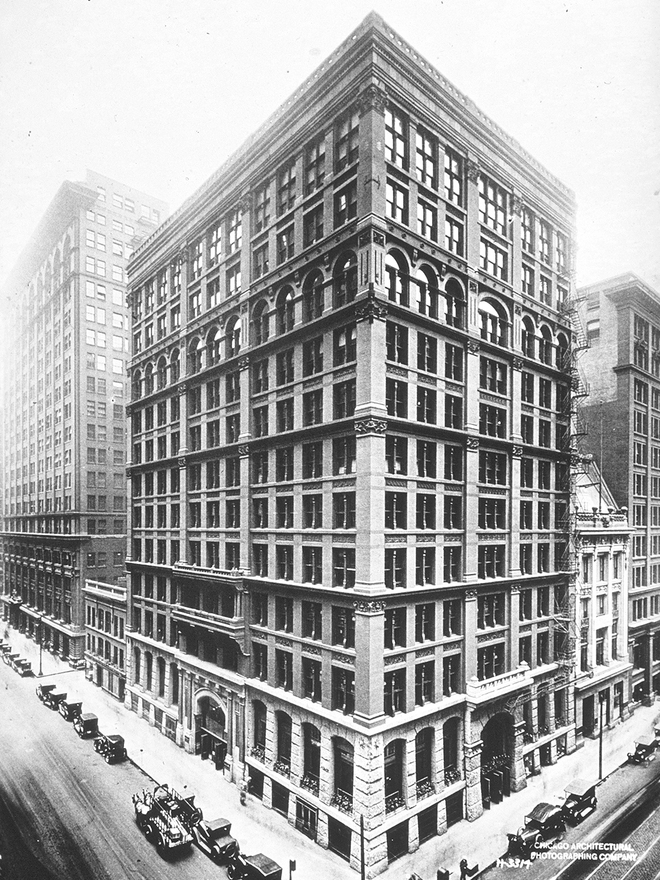
Home Insurance Building

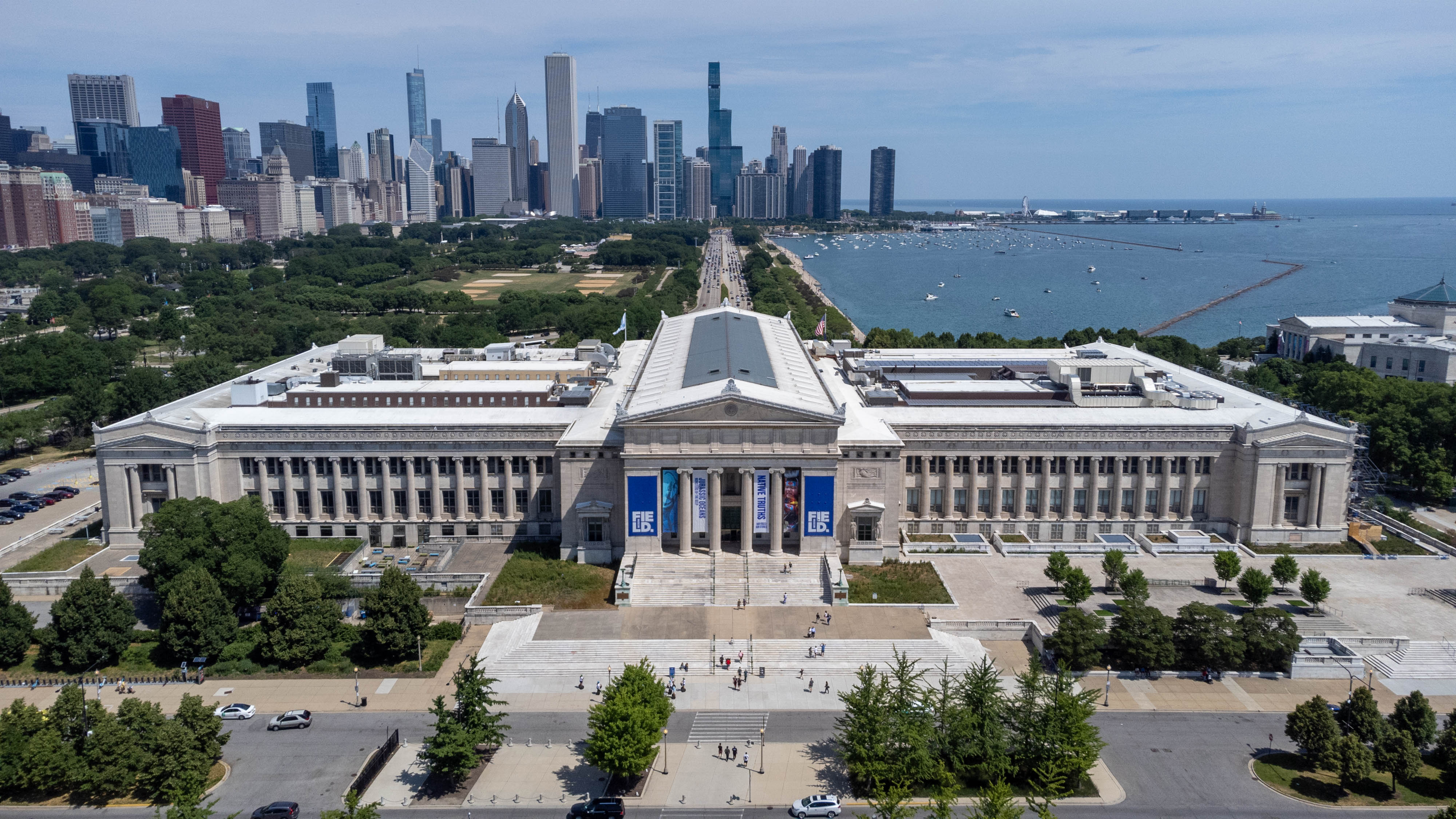
Field Museum in Chicago

- 1885:
  - Home Insurance Building building was the first skyscraper that stood in Chicago from 1885 to 1931. Originally ten stories and 138 ft (42.1 m) tall, it was designed by William Le Baron Jenney in 1884 Two floors were added in 1891, bringing its now finished height to 180 feet (54.9 meters). It was the first tall building to be supported both inside and outside by a fireproof structural steel frame, though it also included reinforced concrete. A landmark lost to history and is considered the world's first skyscraper.
  - Mount Olivet Catholic Cemetery was founded.

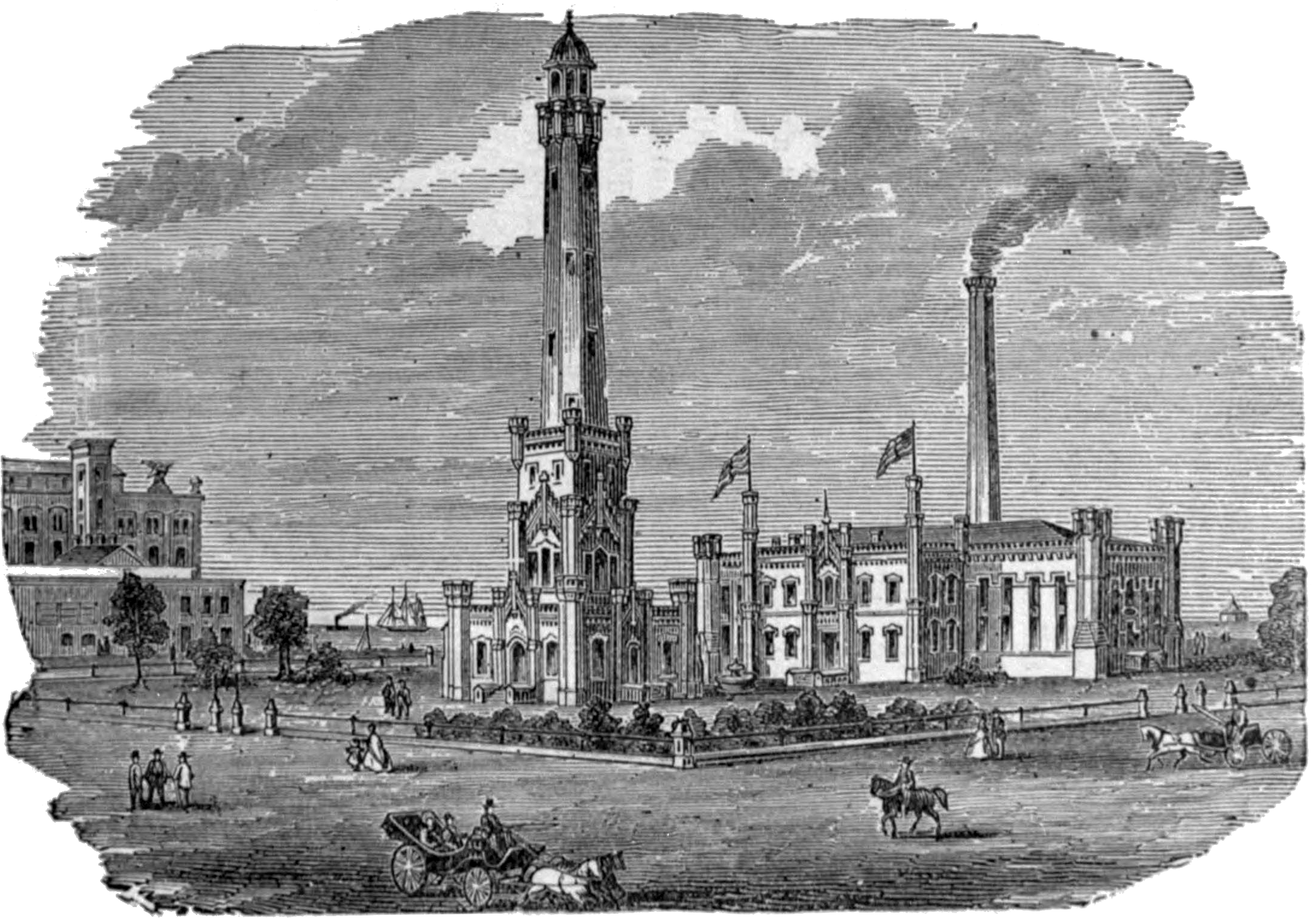
Chicago Water Tower and Chicago Avenue Pumping Station, circa 1886

- 1886
  - May 4, the Haymarket riot.
  - Chicago Evening Post published (until 1932).
- 1887: Newberry Library established.
- 1888: Dearborn Observatory rebuilt.
- 1889
  - Hull House founded.
  - Auditorium Building completed.
  - Auditorium Theatre opened.
  - Mount Olive Cemetery was founded.
- 1890
  - The University of Chicago is founded by John D. Rockefeller.
  - Population: 1,099,850.
- 1891
  - Chicago Symphony Orchestra founded by Theodore Thomas.
  - Provident Hospital founded.
  - Serial killer H.H. Holmes murdered at least 5 people in Englewood, Chicago between 1891-1894.
- 1892
  - June 6, The Chicago and South Side Rapid Transit Railroad (later the Green Line (CTA)), Chicago's first 'L' line, went into operation.
  - Masonic Temple for two years, the tallest building in Chicago.
  - Streetcar tunnels in Chicago (under the Chicago River) in use until 1906.
  - Old Chicago Historical Society Building was built.
- 1893
  - May 1 – October 30, The World's Columbian Exposition (World's Fair); World's Parliament of Religions held.
  - October 28, Mayor Carter Harrison III was assassinated by Patrick Eugene Prendergast.
  - Sears, Roebuck and Company in business.
  - First Ferris wheel built by George Washington Gale Ferris Jr.
  - Art Institute of Chicago building opens.
  - Monadnock Building completed.
  - Universal Peace Congress held.
  - Chicago Civic Federation founded.
- 1894
  - May 11 – August 2, the Pullman Strike.
  - Ženské Listy women's magazine begins publication.
  - Field Museum of Natural History established.
- 1895:
  - May 7, the Metropolitan West Side Elevated Railroad (later the Blue Line (CTA)) opened.
  - Marquette Building completed.
- 1896
  - 1896 Democratic National Convention held; Bryan delivers Cross of Gold speech.
  - Campaign "to improve municipal service and politics" begun in 1896.
  - Abeny beauty shop and Tonnesen Sisters photo studio in business.
- 1897
  - March 12, The Chicago Elevator Protective Association of Chicago was formed. Later, on July 15, 1901, to become the International Union of Elevator Constructors Local 2.
  - The Union Loop Elevated is completed.
  - National union of meat packers formed.
  - The Chicago Cultural Center, originally the main library of the Chicago Public Library, opened.
- 1898: National peace jubilee was held.
- 1899
  - Cook County juvenile court established.
  - Municipal Art League established.
  - Carson, Pirie, Scott and Company Building constructed.

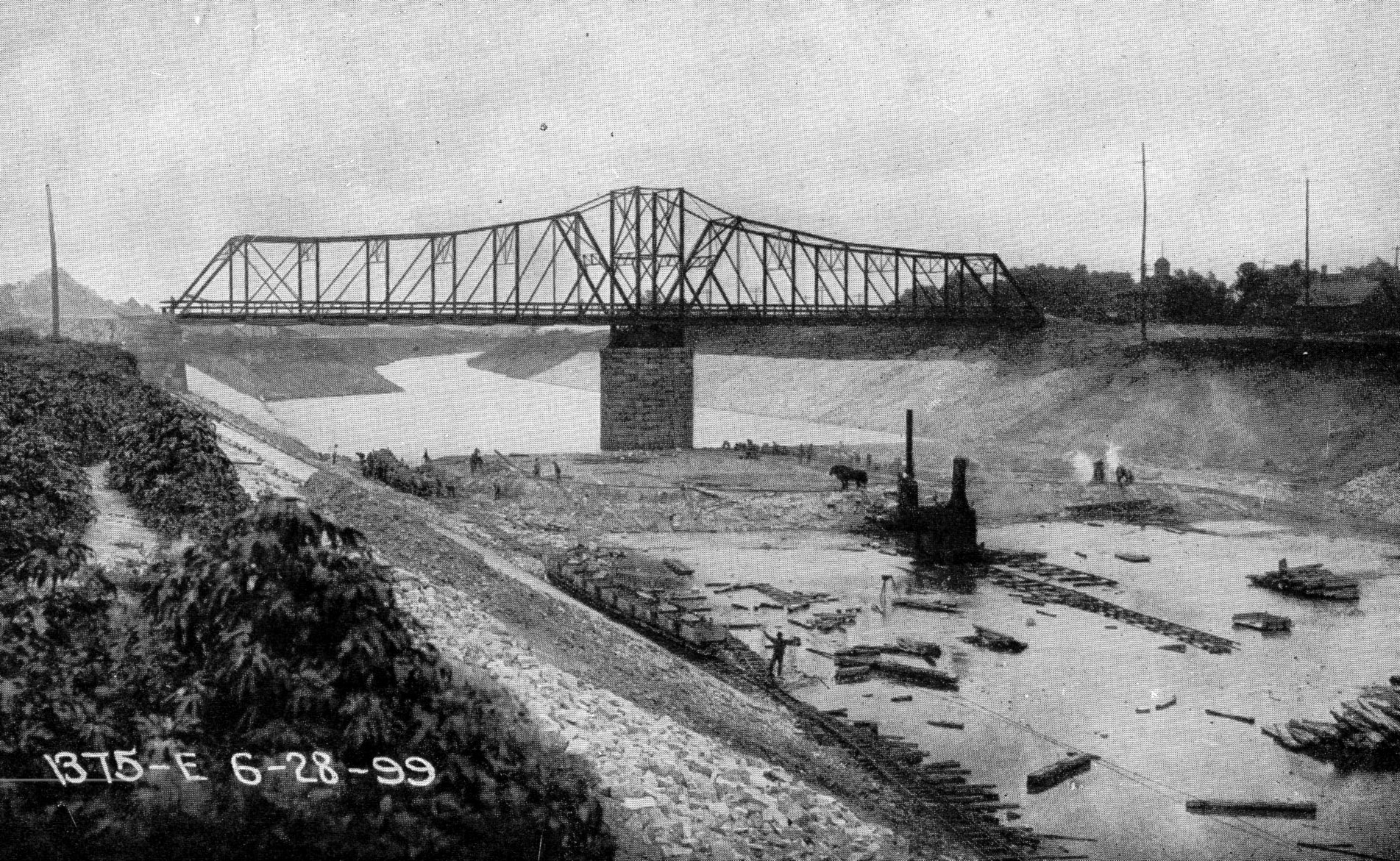
Chicago-Sanitary-and-Ship-Canal, during construction

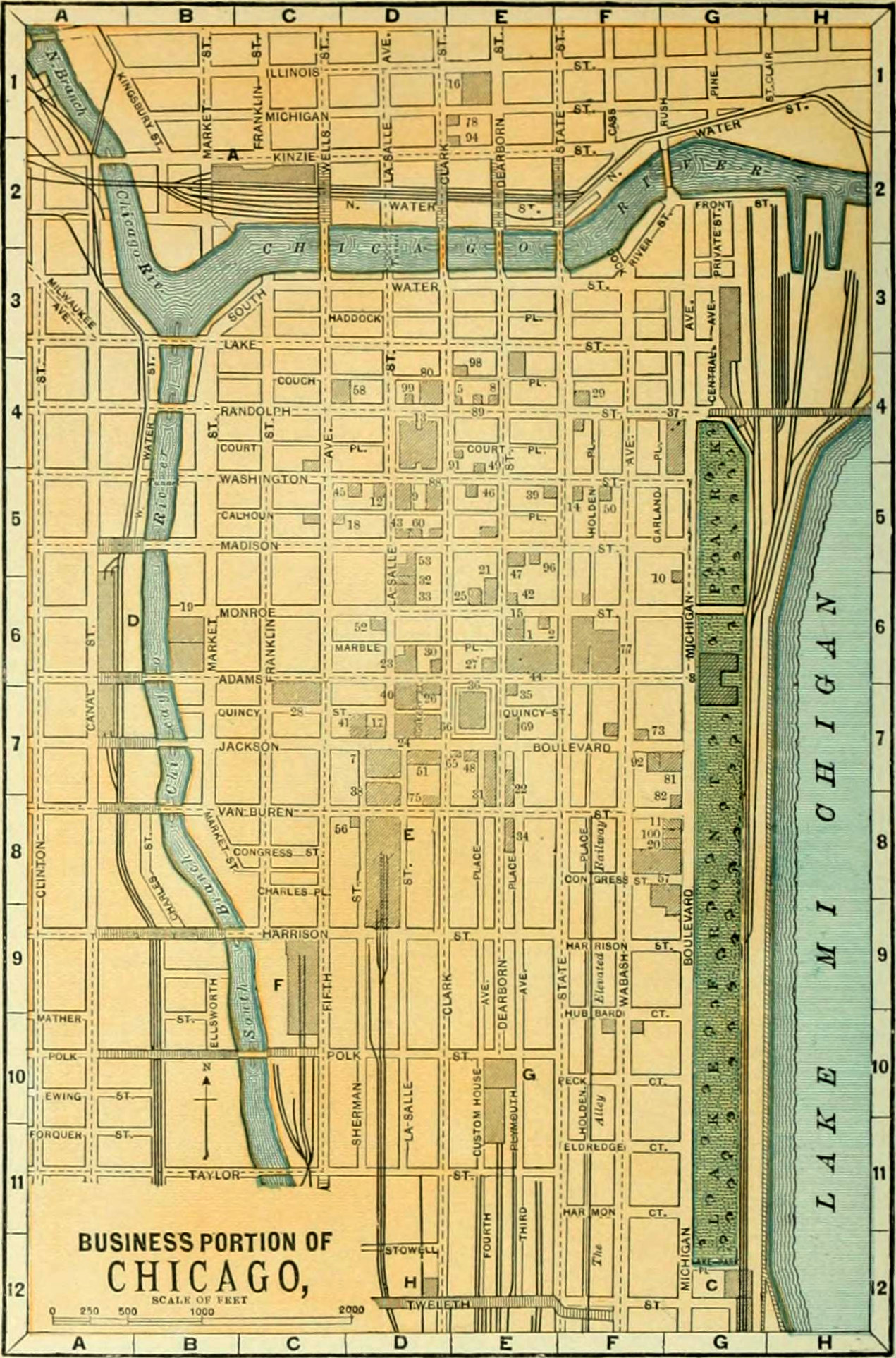
Map of the business portion of Chicago

== 20th century ==
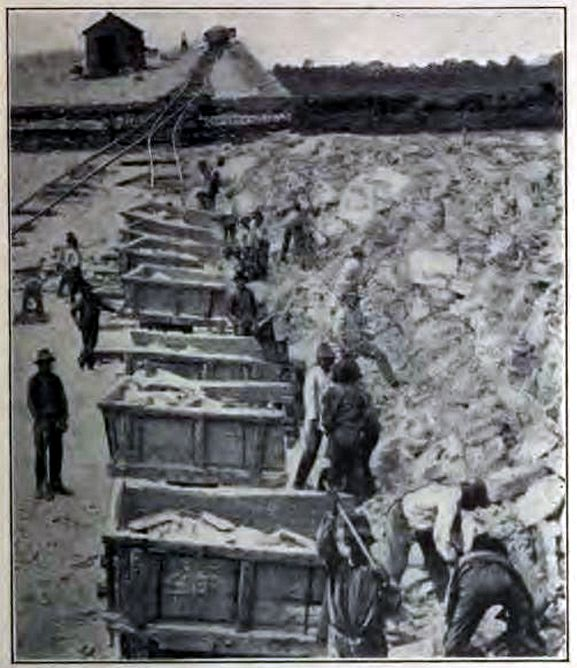
Construction of the Chicago Drainage Canal, 1900s

=== 1900s–1940s ===
- 1900
  - May 31, The Northwestern Elevated Railroad, later the Red Line (CTA), Purple Line (CTA) and the Brown Line (CTA), opened.
  - Chicago Sanitary and Ship Canal opens; the Chicago River is completely reversed.
  - Municipal Reference Library active (approximate date).
  - Labor strike of machinists.
  - Saint Luke Cemetery was founded.
  - Population: 1,698,575.
- 1902
  - Meatpacking strike.
  - Montrose Cemetery was founded.
- 1903
  - December 30, Iroquois Theater Fire
  - City Club of Chicago formed.
- 1905
  - The Industrial Workers of the World was founded in June
  - Teamsters' strike.
  - Chicago Defender newspaper begins publication.
  - City Hall rebuilding completed.
  - Chicago Federal Building completed.
- 1906
  - Municipal court established.
  - The Chicago White Sox defeated the Chicago Cubs in the only all-Chicago World Series.
  - Sinclair's fictional The Jungle published.
  - Chicago Tunnel Company operated a 2 ft. narrow-gauge railway freight tunnel network (until 1959).
- 1907:
  - Adolph Kroch opens a bookstore which will evolve into Kroch's and Brentano's
  - The Chicago Cubs win their first World Series
- 1908
  - The Chicago Cubs win the World Series for the second year in a row. They would not win again until 2016, 108 years later.
  - Binga Bank in business.
- 1909: Burnham's Plan of Chicago presented.
- 1910: Population: 2,185,283.
  - July 1: Comiskey Park opened (originally called White Sox Park).
  - December 22: Chicago Union Stock Yards fire (1910)
  - Big Jim Colosimo and Johnny Torrio started the Chicago Outfit.
- 1911: Chicago and North Western Railway Terminal completed.
- 1912:
  - Harriet Monroe starts Poetry, which will soon make Chicago a magnet for modern poets.
- 1913
  - Great Lakes Storm of 1913
  - Wabash Avenue YMCA opens.
- 1914
  - April 23: Wrigley Field opened (originally called Weeghman Park).
  - Biograph Theater opened.
  - Alpha Suffrage Club active.
  - Oscar Stanton De Priest became the first African-American alderman of Chicago.

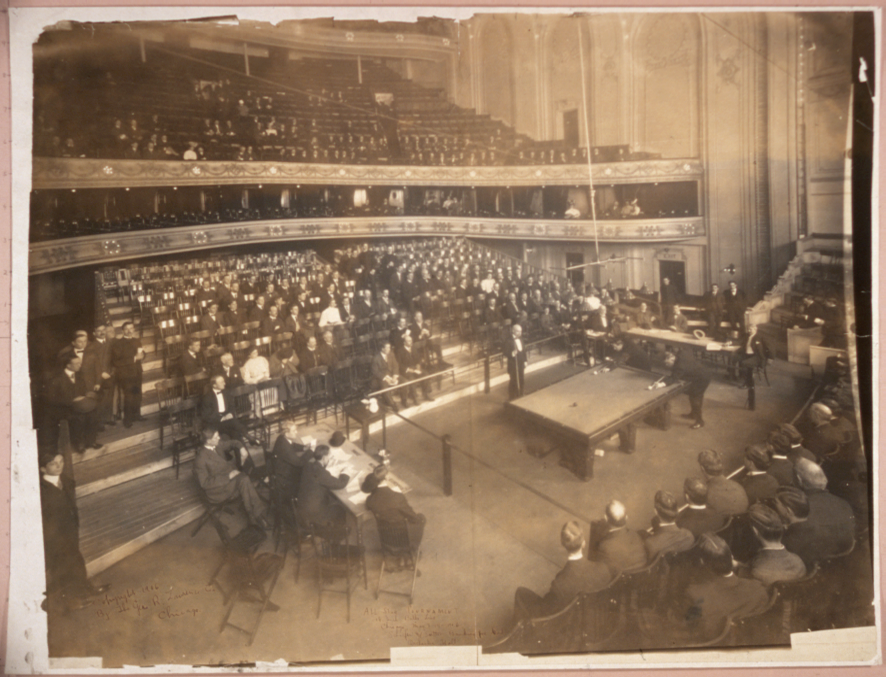
All Star Tournament, 18 Inch Balke Line, Chicago, May 7–14, 1906

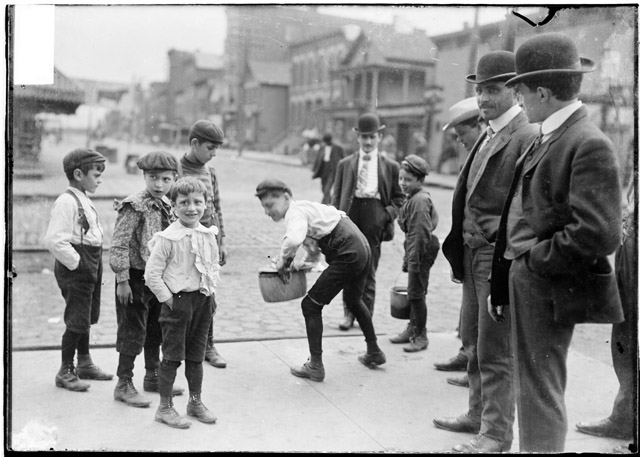
Jewish men and boys standing on a sidewalk in Chicago, 1903

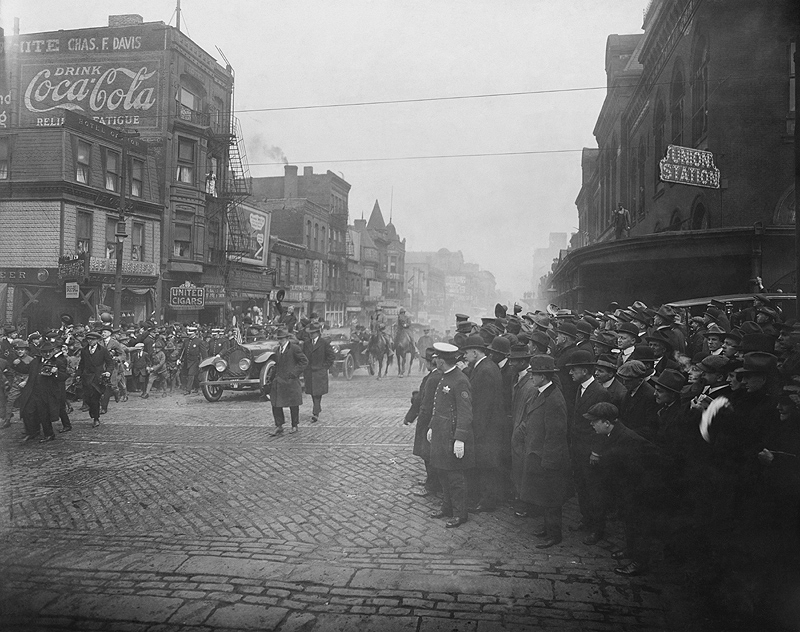
Theodore Roosevelt in Chicago, 1915

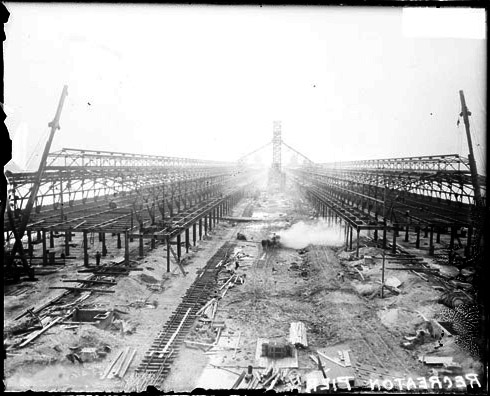
During construction, 1915 (Chicago Daily News)

- 1915
  - July 24, the SS Eastland Disaster.
  - Chicago Municipal Tuberculosis Sanitarium founded.
  - The Great Migration (African American) began. In the first wave of migration between 1915-1940, Chicago's Black population more than doubled.
- 1916
  - Rebuilding of the American Fort
  - Navy Pier built.
- 1917:
  - January 8, Williams vs. City of Chicago U.S. Supreme Court case.
  - October 15, The Chicago White Sox won the MLB World Series. They would not win again until 2005, 88 years later.
- 1918
  - Irving Park Cemetery was founded.
  - Micheaux Film and Book Company in business.
  - The Spanish flu killed over 8,500 people in Chicago between September and November 1918.
- 1919
  - July 27, the Chicago race riot of 1919.
  - Real estate broker Archibald Teller opened the first Fannie May candy store.
- 1920: Population: 2,701,705.
- 1921
  - Chicago Bears won their first NFL Championship.
  - Balaban and Katz Chicago Theatre built, (later the Chicago Theatre).
  - Field Museum of Natural History relocates to Chicago Park District.
  - Street-widening and street-opening projects underway.
  - Medill School of Journalism opens.
- 1922
  - Chicago Council on Global Affairs established.
  - Al-Sadiq Mosque, the first mosque in Chicago and the oldest existing mosque in the United States, built.
- 1923: Chicago adopts its first zoning ordinance.
- 1924
  - Murder trial and conviction of Leopold and Loeb.
  - October 9: Soldier Field opened.
- 1925
  - Goodman Theatre established.
  - Uptown Theatre (Chicago) opened.
  - Chicago railway station opened.
  - The Tribune Tower was completed on Michigan Avenue. The building's large Gothic entrance contains pieces of stone from other famous buildings: Westminster Abbey, Cologne Cathedral, the Alamo, the Taj Mahal, the Great Pyramid, and the Arc de Triomphe.
  - Al Capone took control of the Chicago Outfit following the attempted murder and subsequent retirement of Johnny Torrio.
- 1926
  - Nederlander Theatre opened.
  - Granada Theatre opened.
- 1927
  - Originally called the Chicago Municipal Airport, Chicago Midway International Airport opened. It was renamed in 1949 to honor the Battle of Midway in World War II.
  - July 28: 27 people, mostly women and children, were killed in the Favorite Boat Disaster.
- 1929
  - February 14, the St. Valentine's Day Massacre.
  - March 28, Chicago Stadium opened.
  - Oscar De Priest becomes U.S. representative for Illinois's 1st congressional district.
  - Civic Opera Building & Civic Opera House opened.
- 1930
  - March 6: 50,000 gather for International Unemployment Day, capping 10 days of protest against Great Depression conditions.
  - May 12, Adler Planetarium opened, through a gift from local merchant Max Adler. It was the first planetarium in the Western Hemisphere.
  - April 6, Twinkies are invented in Schiller Park.
  - May 30, Shedd Aquarium opens.
  - The Merchandise Mart was built for Marshall Field & Co. The $32 million, 4.2 million square foot (390,000 m^{2}) building was the world's largest commercial building. It was sold it to Joseph P. Kennedy in 1945.
  - Population: 3,376,438.
- 1932: Chicago Bears won their second NFL Championship.
- 1933
  - Chicago Bears won their third and back-to-back NFL Championship.
  - Museum of Science and Industry (Chicago) opened.
  - March 6: Mayor Anton Cermak was killed while riding in a car with President-elect Roosevelt. The assassin was thought to have been aiming for Roosevelt.
- 1933–34: Century of Progress World's Fair.
- 1934
  - May 19: Chicago Union Stock Yards fire (1934)
  - Chicago Blackhawks won the NHL Stanley Cup
  - July 1: Brookfield Zoo opened.
  - July 22: John Dillinger was shot by the FBI in the alley next to the Biograph Theater.
- 1935
  - January 19: Coopers Inc. sells the world's first briefs.
  - Jay Berwanger of the University of Chicago is awarded the very first Heisman Trophy
- 1937: Labor strike of steelworkers and the 1937 Memorial Day massacre.
- 1938
  - Community Factbook begins publication.
  - Chicago Blackhawks won the NHL Stanley Cup.
- 1940: Population: 3,396,808.
  - Chicago Bears won their fourth NFL Championship.
- 1941: Chicago Bears won their fifth and back-to-back NFL Championship.
- 1943: Chicago Bears won their sixth NFL Championship.
- 1944:
  - February, O'Hare International Airport was built (originally named Orchard Field Airport).
  - December 26, Premiere of Williams' play The Glass Menagerie.
  - Buddhist Temple of Chicago and Midwest Buddhist Temple Taiko, the first Buddhist temples in Chicago, founded.
- 1945:
  - Ebony magazine begins publication.
  - Curse of the Billy Goat on the Chicago Cubs, which lasted until 2016.
- 1946:
  - Construction of Thatcher Homes begins.
  - Chicago Bears won their seventh NFL Championship.
- 1948: Chicago Daily Sun and Times newspaper begins publication.

=== 1950s–1990s ===
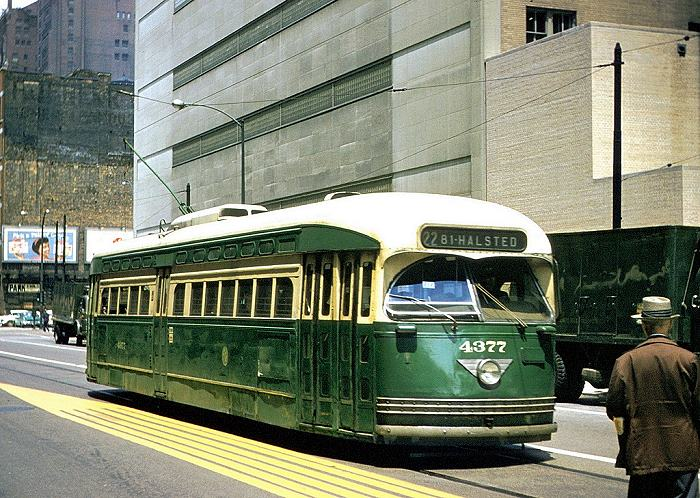
PCC streetcar, Chicago, 1950

- 1950
  - Chess Records in business.
  - Population: 3,620,962. This was the peak of Chicago's population, which has been declining ever since.
- 1951
  - December 20: The Edens Expressway, Chicago's first expressway, opened.
- 1952:
  - July: Chicago is the location of both major party presidential nominating conventions for the 1952 presidential election, which are the very first presidential conventions to be nationally televised.
    - July 7–11: 1956 Republican National Convention
    - July 21–26: 1956 Democratic National Convention
- 1953: American Indian Center, the oldest urban Native American center in the United States, opened.
- 1954: Johnson Products Company in business.
- 1955
  - April 15: The first McDonald's franchise restaurant, owned by Ray Kroc, opened in the suburb of Des Plaines.
  - September 3-6: Thousands of people attended the visitation and funeral of Emmett Till at Roberts Temple Church of God in Christ in Bronzeville.
  - December 15: The Eisenhower Expressway opened.
- 1958
  - December 1, Our Lady of the Angels School Fire.
  - The last streetcar ran in the city. At one time, Chicago had the largest streetcar system in the world.
- 1959: Second City comedy troupe active.
- 1960
  - February 29: The first of the Playboy Clubs, featuring bunnies, opened in Chicago.
  - September 26: Nixon-Kennedy televised presidential debate held.
  - November 5: The Kennedy Expressway was completed.
  - White flight accelerated as 10 community areas flipped from majority white populations to majority Black populations from 1960-1980.
  - Population: 3,550,404.
- 1961
  - December 12: The Dan Ryan Expressway opened.
  - Chicago Blackhawks won the NHL Stanley Cup.
- 1963:
  - September, Oak Woods Cemetery ended their racial segregation policy following protests.
  - Donald Rumsfeld became U.S. representative for Illinois's 13th congressional district.
  - Chicago Bears won their eighth NFL Championship.
- 1964
  - April 20: The Skokie Swift, later re-named Yellow Line (CTA), opened on the old Skokie Valley tracks of the Chicago, North Shore and Milwaukee Railroad.
  - October 24: The Stevenson Expressway opened.
- 1965–66 – The Chicago Freedom Movement, centering on the topic of open housing, paves the way for the 1968 Fair Housing Act.
- 1966
  - July 13–14: Chicago student nurse massacre
- 1967
  - January 26 – 27, Major snowstorm deposits 23 inches of snow, closing the city for several days.
  - August 1: maiden voyage of UAC TurboTrain.
- 1968:
  - February 7: Mickelberry Sausage Company plant explosion kills nine and injured 70.
  - April 5 - 7, 1968 Chicago riots following the assassination of Martin Luther King Jr..
  - August 26 – 29, 1968 Democratic National Convention and its accompanying anti-Vietnam War protests.
- 1969
  - October: Weathermen's antiwar demonstration.
  - December 4: Black Panther Fred Hampton assassinated.
  - The Chicago 8 trial opens.
  - The 100-floor John Hancock Center was built.
- 1970
  - Soul Train television program begins broadcasting.
  - Casa Aztlán (organization) founded.
  - Population: 3,366,957.
- 1971: Segundo Ruiz Belvis Cultural Center founded.
- 1972: Vietnam Veterans Against the War headquartered in Chicago.
- 1973: Sears Tower, the tallest building in the world for the next 25 years, was completed.
- 1974: Steppenwolf Theatre Company founded.
- 1977: Chicago Marathon begins.
- 1978: First BBS goes online on February 16.
- 1979
  - Heavy snowstorm and city's slow response lead to upset of incumbent mayor.
  - May 25, the American Airlines Flight 191 crashes.
  - August: First Chicago Jazz Festival held in Grant Park.
  - Chicago's first female mayor, Jane M. Byrne, takes office after winning election
  - Woodstock Institute headquartered in city.
- 1980:
  - July 4, first Taste of Chicago held on Michigan Avenue.
  - Population: 3,005,072.
- 1981: Hill Street Blues television show premieres on January 15.
- 1982
  - September – October: Chicago Tylenol murders
- 1983
  - Harold Washington becomes the first African American mayor, after winning election]
  - Ordinance banning handguns takes effect.
- 1984
  - June 8-10: First Chicago Blues Festival held in Grant Park.
  - The Chicago Cubs reach the postseason for the first time since 1945
  - The Nike shoe Air Jordan is made for superstar basketball player of the Chicago Bulls Michael Jordan.
  - Heartland Institute headquartered in city.
- 1986
  - Oprah Winfrey's Harpo Productions, Inc. in business.
  - The Chicago Bears win Super Bowl XX
  - Presidential Towers complex completed

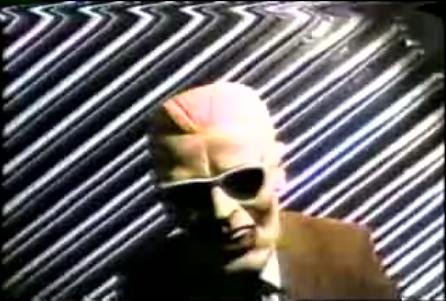
Max Headroom pirate broadcast at WTTW

- 1987
  - November 22, Max Headroom signal hijacking
  - December 2, Eugene Sawyer became mayor following the sudden death of Mayor Harold Washington.
- 1988
  - Lights are installed in Wrigley Field
  - February 7, The NBA hosts its 38th All-Star Game at the Chicago Stadium in Chicago.
  - Christian Peacemaker Teams headquartered in city.
- 1989
  - April 24, Richard M. Daley inaugurated as mayor, after winning the 1989 Chicago mayoral special election.
- 1990: Population: 2,783,726.
- 1991
  - May 28, at the Consumer Electronics Show in Chicago, Sony proudly revealed that it was working with Nintendo to create a version of the Super NES with an in-built CD drive. The two Japanese companies had been working together in secret on the project, tentatively titled the Nintendo PlayStation, since 1989 and with the hype about CD-ROM reaching fever pitch, Sony’s announcement should have been a highlight of the trade show. Eventually leads to betrayal of the company Nintendo to Sony into Leading to the beginning of PlayStation console.
  - October 7, Harold Washington Library, the new main branch of the Chicago Public Library and the largest public library building in the world, opened.
  - The Chicago Bulls won their first NBA championship.
- 1992
  - April 13, the Chicago Flood.
  - The Chicago Bulls won their second and back-to-back NBA championship.
- 1993
  - The Chicago Bulls won their third NBA championship to achieve a three-peat.
  - October 31 - The Orange Line (CTA) opened.
- 1994
  - August 18 - United Center opened.
  - October 2 - All CTA train lines were re-named to color designations: Red Line (Howard-Dan Ryan); Blue Line (O'Hare-Forest Park-54/Cermak); Orange Line (Midway); Brown Line (Ravenswood); Purple Line (Evanston); Green Line (Lake-Ashland/63-East 63rd); and Yellow Line (Skokie Swift).
- 1995
  - The Chicago Heat Wave of 1995.
  - Your Radio Playhouse begins broadcasting.
  - Kroch's and Brentano's, once the largest privately owned bookstore chain in the US, closes.
- 1996
  - Chicago hosts the 1996 Democratic National Convention, sparking protests such as the one whereby Civil Rights Movement historian Randy Kryn and 10 others were arrested by the Federal Protective Service.
  - City website online (approximate date).
  - The Chicago Bulls won their fourth NBA championship while finishing a season of 72-10 record.
- 1997: The Chicago Bulls won their fifth and second straight back-to-back NBA championship.
- 1998
  - The Chicago Bulls won their sixth NBA championship to achieve a second three-peat in eight years.
  - October 25: The Chicago Fire won their first MLS cup.

== 21st century ==
=== 2000s–Present ===
- 2000: Population: 2,895,671.
- 2001:
  - Chicago International Speedway is opened.
  - Boeing moves its headquarters from Seattle to Chicago.
- 2002: Lakeview Polar Bear Club founded (now known as the Chicago Polar Bear Club).
- 2003
  - Meigs Field closed after having large X-shaped gouges dug into the runway surface by bulldozers in the middle of the night.
  - Chicago Film Archives founded.
  - February 17: E2 nightclub stampede
  - June 29: 2003 Chicago balcony collapse
- 2004
  - July 16, Millennium Park opened.
  - August 8, Dave Matthews Band bus incident
- 2005
  - The Chicago White Sox win their first World Series in 88 years.
  - Regional Chicago Metropolitan Agency for Planning established.
  - Lollapalooza became a permanent annual summer event in Grant Park.
  - Riot Fest began as a multi-venue music festival in Chicago.
- 2006
  - May 1, the 2006 U.S. immigration reform protests draw over 400,000.
  - June 25 - The Pink Line (CTA) opened.
  - Cloud Gate artwork installed in Millennium Park.
- 2008: November 4, US President-elect Barack Obama makes his victory speech in Grant Park.

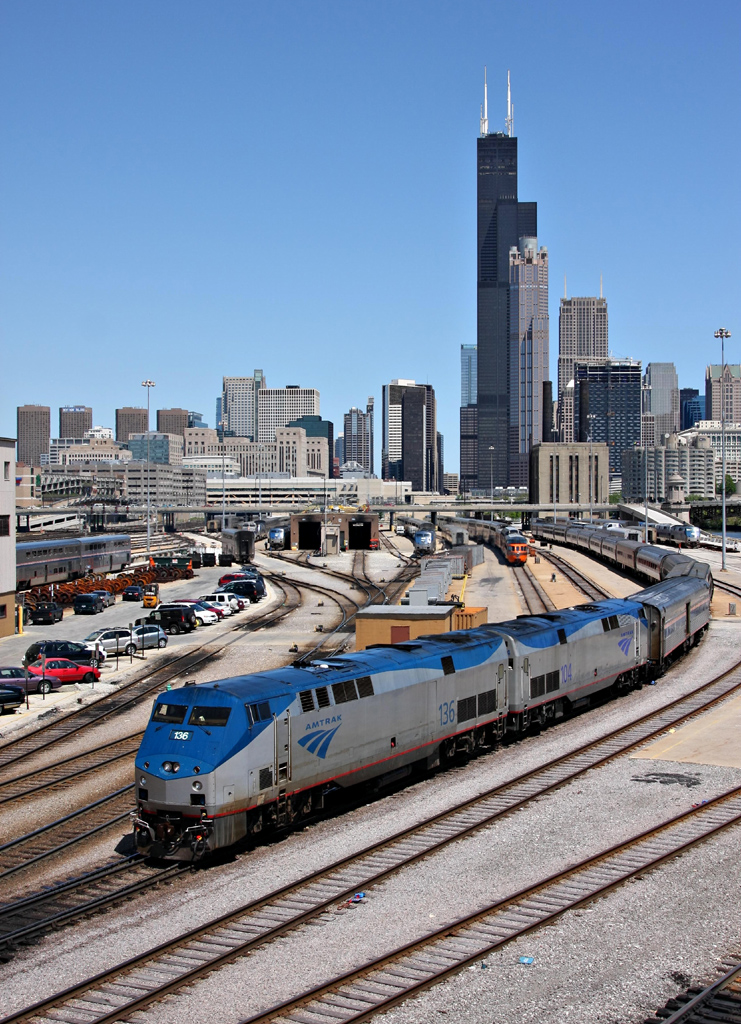
In 2009, an Amtrak Lake Shore Limited train backing into Chicago Union Station

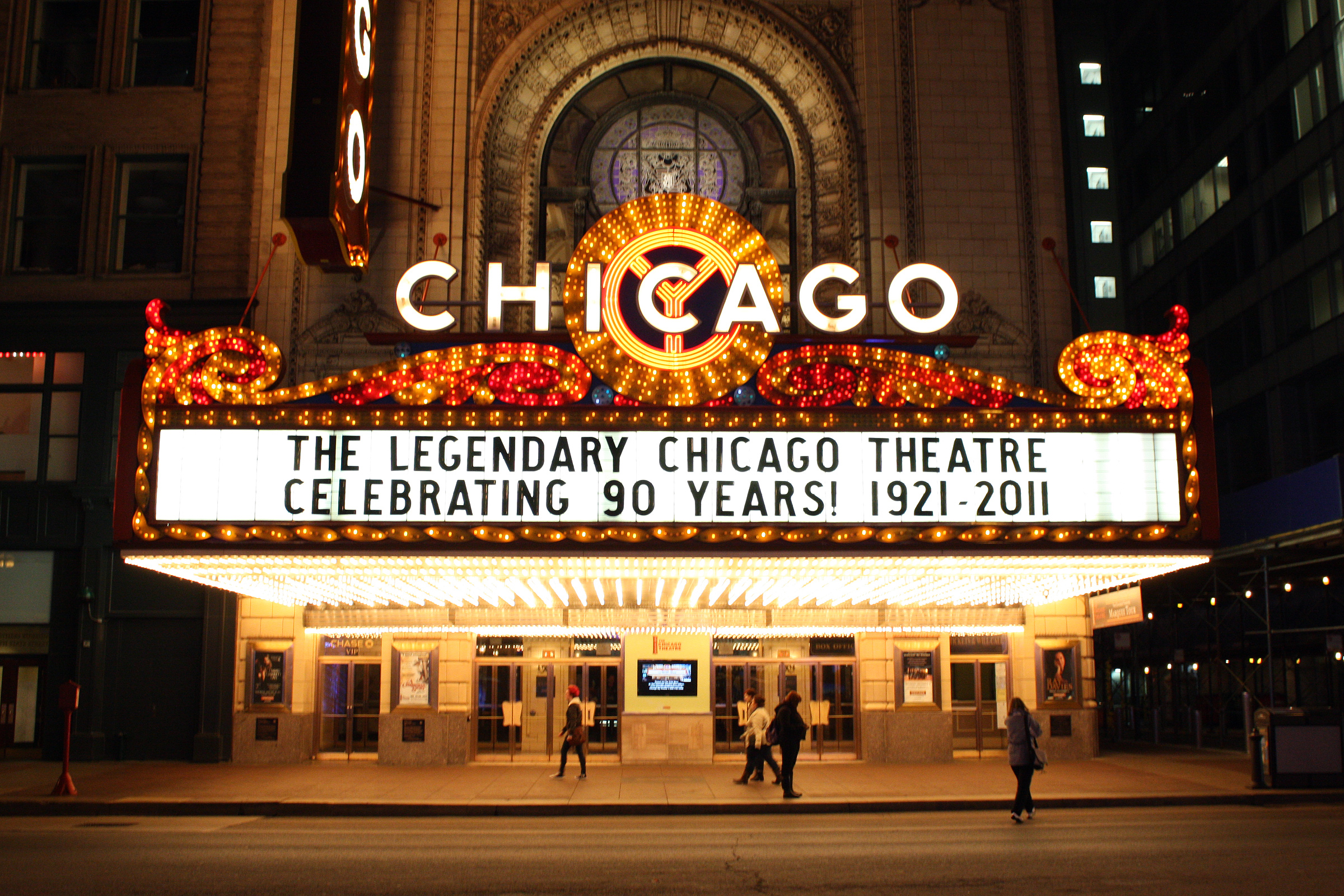
Chicago Theater in 2011

- 2010
  - June 28: US supreme court case McDonald v. City of Chicago decided; overturns city handgun ban.
  - Chicago Blackhawks win the Stanley Cup.
  - City of Chicago Data Portal launched.
  - Population: 2,695,598.
- 2011
  - February 2: 900 cars abandoned on Lake Shore Drive due to Blizzard.
  - March 30: Last of Cabrini Green towers torn down.
  - Rahm Emanuel became mayor, and was the first Jewish mayor of Chicago.
  - Population: 8,707,120; metro 17,504,753.
- 2012
  - 38th G8 summit and 2012 Chicago Summit are to take place in Chicago.
  - The first of an ongoing franchise of NBC Chicago-set dramas, Chicago Fire, makes its world premiere on WMAQ
- 2013
  - Chicago Blackhawks win the Stanley Cup scoring 2 goals in 17 seconds to defeat the Boston Bruins
  - Robin Kelly becomes U.S. representative for Illinois's 2nd congressional district.
- 2014
  - January: Chiberia
  - August: Archer Daniels Midland completes its headquarters move from Decatur to the Loop.
  - November 2: Wallenda performs high-wire stunt.
- 2015
  - 606 linear park opens.
  - FOX's Empire premieres on WFLD-32.
  - Chicago Blackhawks win the Stanley Cup yet again for the third time in six years, establishing a "puck dynasty" nationwide and arguably becoming the best team in the NHL.
  - Video of the murder of Laquan McDonald is released by court order, and protests ensue.
- 2016
  - February 2: Gage Park murders
  - June 16: McDonald's announces it will move its headquarters from Oak Brook to the West Loop by 2018.
  - November 2: Chicago Cubs win the world series.
  - ConAgra completes its headquarters move from Omaha to the Merchandise Mart.
  - Shree Ganesh Temple of Chicago, the first Hindu temple in the city of Chicago, opened.

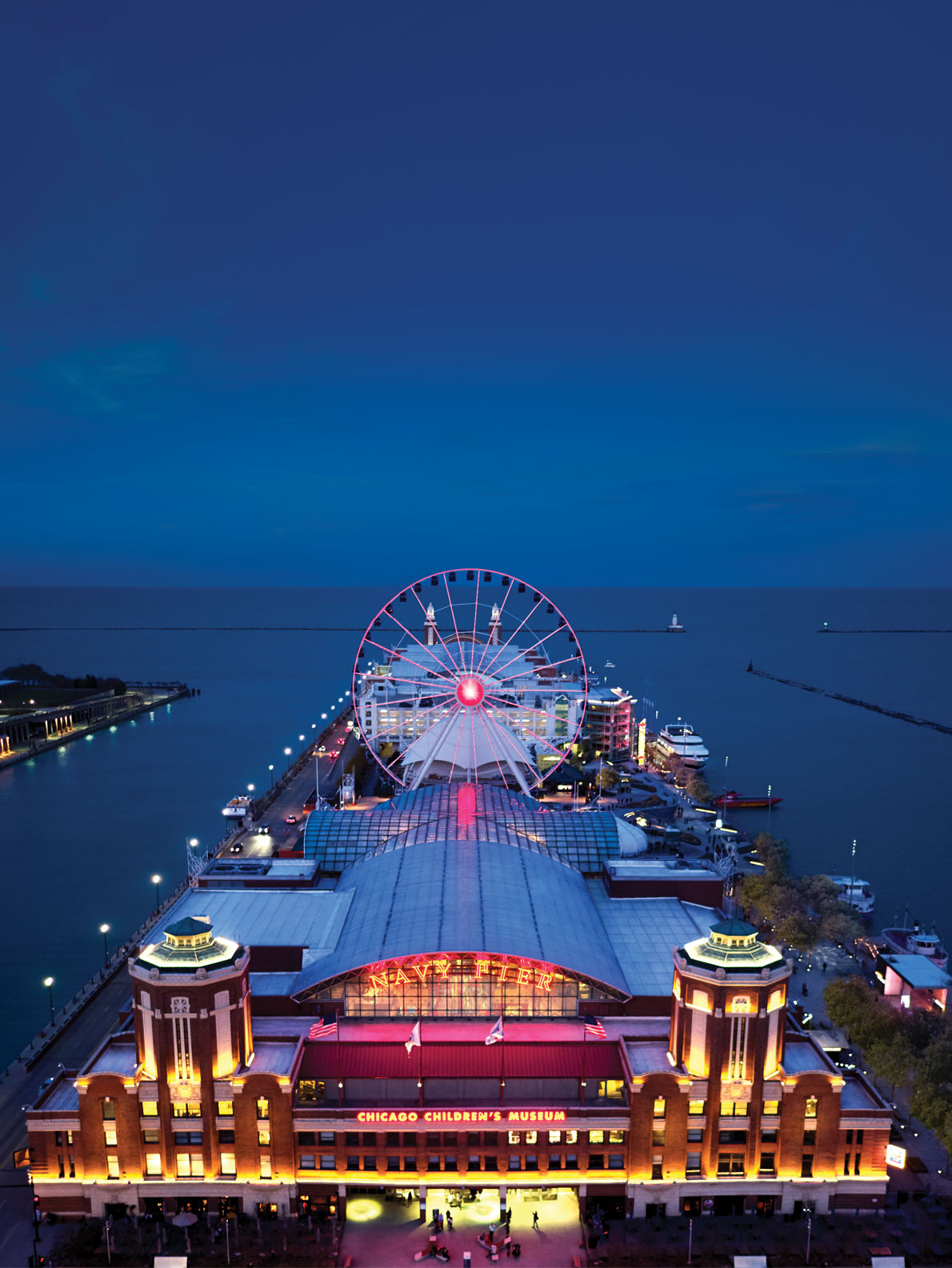
Navy Pier in 2017

- 2017
  - January 21: Women's protest against U.S. president Trump.
  - City approves public high school "post-graduation plan" graduation requirement (to be effected 2020).
- 2018
  - January 7: The Chi (TV Series) premieres on Showtime.
  - Walgreens announces the move of its headquarters from Deerfield, including 2,000 jobs, to the Old Chicago Main Post Office.

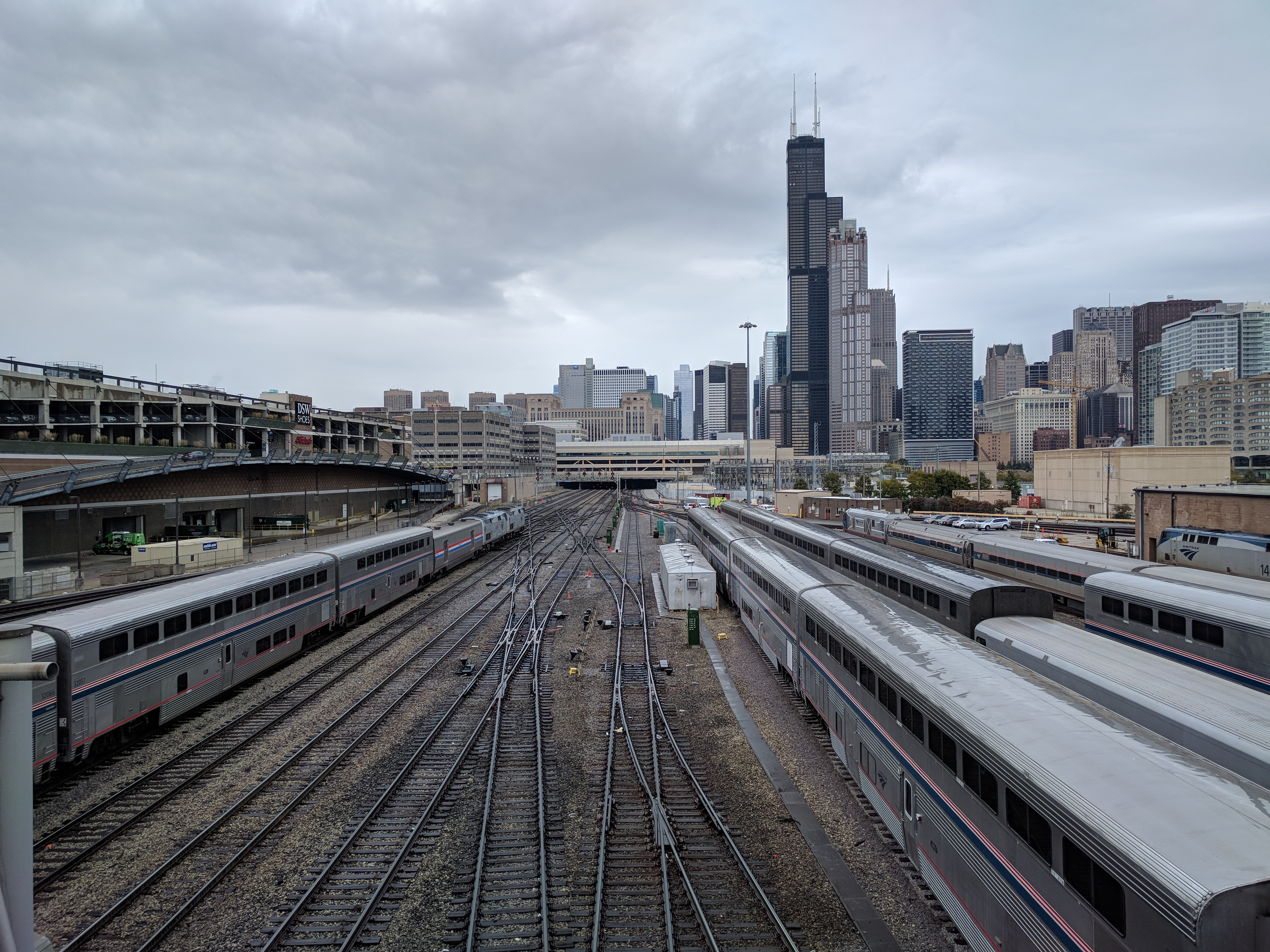
14th Street Coach Yard and Willis Tower, October 2018

- 2019
  - May 20: Lori Lightfoot became the first female African-American and LGBTQ mayor of Chicago.
  - June: Endangered piping plovers Monty and Rose became the first pair of piping plovers to successfully nest and breed in Chicago since 1955.
  - July 9: Alligator Chance the Snapper was found swimming in a lagoon in Humboldt Park, Chicago, was eventually captured and sent to an alligator sanctuary in Florida.
- 2020
  - February 16: The NBA hosts its 69th All-Star game at the United Center in Chicago.
  - March 16: First Chicago death due to the COVID-19 pandemic; Governor J. B. Pritzker and Mayor Lori Lightfoot issue a stay at home order. Over 7,700 people in Chicago died in the pandemic.
  - May 28 – June 1: George Floyd protests in Chicago
  - August 10: 2020 Midwest derecho
  - Population: 2,741,730.
- 2021: The Chicago Sky won their first WNBA championship, defeating the Phoenix Mercury 3-1.
- 2022
  - May – July: United States abortion protests (2022-present)
  - Venezuelan refugee crisis
- 2023
  - May 15: Brandon Johnson becomes mayor.
- 2024
  - July 14–15: Back-to-back tornado outbreaks produce 6 weak tornadoes in the city limits of Chicago, one of which was downtown near the Presidential Towers.
  - August 19–22: The 2024 Democratic National Convention is held at the United Center.
- 2025
  - May 9: Robert Francis Prevost, born in Chicago, is elected Pope as Leo XIV
  - September 21: Over 300 people participated in the first Chicago River Swim since 1926.
  - Operation Midway Blitz
  - 2025 deployment of federal forces in the United States
- 2026
  - April: Three eaglets were born in Chicago for the first time in over 100 years.
  - June 19: The Barack Obama Presidential Center opened on Juneteenth.

== See also ==
- History of Chicago
- List of mayors of Chicago
- National Register of Historic Places listings in Chicago
