= List of cemeteries in Cook County, Illinois =

This list of cemeteries in Cook County, Illinois includes currently operating, historical (closed for new interments), and defunct (graves abandoned or removed) cemeteries, columbaria, and mausolea which are historical and/or notable. Cook County includes the city of Chicago. This list does not include pet cemeteries.

== List ==
Name	Location	Established	Type	Coordinates	Notes
Acacia Park Cemetery	7800 W. Irving Park Rd., Norridge	1922	Masonic	41.9544°N 87.8236°W	
Alexander Cemetery					
All Saints Catholic Cemetery	700 North River Rd., Des Plaines	1923	Catholic	42.0622°N 87.8930°W	
All Saints Polish National Catholic Cemetery	9201 W. Higgins Rd., Chicago	1895	Catholic		
Altenheim Cemetery	7824 Madison St., Forest Park				
Alton Cemetery					
American Progressive Cemetery (part of Waldheim Cemetery Company)	Forest Park Waldheim Gate #126	1918	Jewish		
Andreas von Zirngibl grave	93rd and Ewing, Midwest Metal Mgmt, Chicago	1855			
Anshe Luknik Cemetery (part of Waldheim Cemetery Company)	Forest Park Waldheim Gate #57	1908	Jewish		
Archer Woods Cemetery (Mt. Glenwood West)	8301 Kean Ave, Willow Springs				
Arlington Heights Cemetery (Wheeling Twnshp)	Arlington Heights				
Assumption Cemetery	19500 S. Cottage Grove Ave., Glenwood		Catholic		
Bachelor's Grove Cemetery	Bachelor Grove Woods, near Midlothian	1844		41.6308°N 87.7708°W	
Baker-Johnson Cemetery					
Barrington Center Cemetery (Miller's Grove)	Barrington Hills	1834		42.11140°N 88.19437°W	
Barrington Union Cemetery (Henry Smith)	Barrington Hills			42.12511°N 88.21978°W	
Bartlett Cemetery	Bartlett	1892			
Beebs Grove Cemetery					
Berger Cemetery	Dolton	1854			
Beth Jacob (Kehilath Jacob Anshe Drohiczen)	Niles				
Bethania Cemetery	7701 Archer Ave., Justice	1894	Lutheran		
Bethany Cemetery	Lemont				
Bethel Cemetery	5736 N. Pulaski Rd., Chicago	1895	Jewish		
Beverly Cemetery	12033 Kedzie Ave., Blue Island	1920			
Bill Funks Cemetery	Tinley Park		Potter's Field		
Bloom Presbyterian Cemetery (also known as First Presbyterian)	Chicago Heights	1843			
Bloomvale Cemetery	Chicago Heights				
Blue Island Cemetery	Blue Island	In Memorial Park			
Bluff City Cemetery	Elgin				
Bohemian National Cemetery	5255 N. Pulaski Rd., Chicago	1877	Primarily Czech	41.9773°N 87.7260°W	
Bowen Memorial Garden (Kenilworth Union Churchyard)	Evanston area				
Brown Family Cemetery	Lemont	1884			
Burr Oak Cemetery	4400 W. 127th St., Alsip	1927	African-American	41.6625°N 87.7297°W	
Burr Oak Lutheran Cemetery					
Cady Cemetery	Inverness				
Calvary (Steger)	Steger	1907			
Calvary Cemetery	Evanston	1859	Catholic	42.0249°N 87.6726°W	
Cedar Park Cemetery	12540 S. Halsted St., Calumet Park	1924			
Chapel Hills Gardens South	11333 S. Central Ave.,Oak Lawn	1927			
Charity Cemetery					
Chicago and Suburban Cemetery (formerly for Menorah Gardens)					
Christ Church Churchyard	Evanston area				
Christ Lutheran Cemetery	Orland Park				
Church of the Holy Comforter	Kenilworth				
Circle of Life Cemetery	Inverness				
Concordia Cemetery	7900 Madison St., Forest Park	1872	Lutheran		
Congregation Betheran Hamedrash Hockoodosh Cemetery (part of Waldheim Cemetery Company)	Forest Park Waldheim Gate #26	1894	Jewish		
Cook County Cemetery at Dunning (Read Dunning Memorial Park)	6550 W. Belle Plaine Ave., Chicago	1854-1911	Potter's field		
Cook County Cemetery for the Indigent (Cook County Cemetery at Oak Forest)	159th St. and Crawford Ave., Oak Forest	1911-1971	Potter's field		
Couch Mausoleum (City Cemetery)	Chicago				
Dalton Cemetery					
Danish Cemetery	Lemont				
Deer Grove Cemetery	Inverness				
DesPlaines Cemetery					
Dewes Cemetery	Glenview				
Douglas Monument Park	Chicago				
East Wheeling Cemetery					
Eden Memorial Park	Schiller Park				
Elk Grove Cemetery	Elk Grove Village			42.0396°N 87.9834°W	
Elliott Cemetery	Harvey area				
Elmwood Cemetery	2905 Thatcher Rd., River Grove		Primarily Greek	41.9319°N 87.8303°W	
English Cemetery	Arlington Heights area				
Evenezer Cemetery					
Ever Rest Cemetery (historical)	Blue Island area				
Evergreen Cemetery	Evergreen Park				
Evergreen Cemetery	Barrington				
Fairmount Willow Hills Memorial Park	Willow Springs				
Fairview Memorial Park	Northlake	1925			
First Evangelical Lutheran Cemetery	Alsip				
First Reformed Cemetery					
First Reformed of Lansing Cemetery	Lansing				
Forest Home Cemetery	863 Des Plaines Ave., Forest Park	1876		41.8698°N 87.8198°W	
Forest Park Cemetery					
Franciscan Cemetery					
German Cemetery	Palatine area			42.10817°N 88.04784°W	
German Lutheran Cemetery					
Glen Flora Cemetery					
Glen Oak Cemetery	Hillside				
Good Shepherd Catholic Cemetery	16201 S. 104th Ave., Orland Park		Catholic		
Graceland Cemetery	4001 N. Clark St., Chicago	1860		41.9545°N 87.6622°W	
Grayson Cemetery					
Greve Cemetery	Hoffman Estates				
Hazel Green Cemetery	Alsip				
Hillside Cemetery	Palatine				
Holy Cross Cemetery	801 Michigan City Rd., Calumet City	1893	Catholic		
Holy Sepulchre Cemetery	6001 West 111th Street, Worth	1923	Catholic	41.6858°N 87.7691°W	
Homewood Memorial Gardens	600 Ridge Rd., Homewood				
Hoosier Grove Immanuel Cemetery	Streamwood				
Immaculate Conception Monastery Cemetery	Chicago				
Immanuel Lutheran (Richton Park)	Richton Park				
Immanuel Lutheran Cemetery	Westchester				
Immanuel Lutheran Cemetery	1214 Rand Rd, Des Plaines	1875	Lutheran		
Immanuel Lutheran Cemetery (Glenview)	Glenview				
Immanuel Lutheran, St. Paul's UCC, Union Cem	Palatine			42.10817°N 88.04793°W	
Irving Park Cemetery	7777 W. Irving Park Rd., Chicago	1918		41.9497°N 87.8230°W	
Jewish Graceland Cemetery (Hebrew Benevolent Society Cemetery)	3919 N. Clark St., Chicago	1851	Jewish		
LaGrange Cemetery (formerly Parkholm)	Berwyn area				
Lake Street / Lakewood Memorial Park	near Elgin				
Lincoln Cemetery	11900 Kedzie Ave., Blue Island	1911	African-American	41.6701°N 87.7026°W	
Lithuanian National Cemetery	Justice	1911	Primarily Lithuanian	41.7411°N 87.8455°W	
Lutheran Home Cemetery	Arlington Heights				
Lyonsville Cemetery	Indian Head Park			41.76520°N 87.89572°W	
Mary Hill Cemetery	8600 Milwaukee Ave, Niles	1959	Primarily Polish Catholic		
Memorial Cemetery	Tinley Park	1858			
Memorial Park Cemetery and Mausoleum	9900 Gross Point Rd., Skokie	1913			
Memorial Park Cemetery Mausoleum	9900 Gross Point Rd., Skokie	1913			
Memory Gardens Cemetery	2501 E. Euclid Ave, Arlington Heights				
Menorah Gardens	2630 S. 17th Ave., Broadview	1930	Jewish		
Montrose Cemetery	5400 N. Pulaski Rd., Chicago	1902		41.9808°N 87.7330°W	
Mount Auburn Memorial Park	4101 Oak Park Ave, Berwyn				
Mount B'Nai B'Rith Cemetery (now Zion Gardens Cemetery)	3600 N. Narragansett Ave., Chicago	1887	Jewish		
Mount Carmel Cemetery	1400 S. Wolf Rd., Hillside	1901	Primarily Italian Catholic	41.8641°N 87.9075°W	
Mount Forest Cemetery	Thornton				
Mount Glenwood Cemetery	Thornton				
Mount Greenwood Cemetery	2900 W. 111th St., Chicago	1880	Nondenominational		
Mount Hope (St. John's U.C.C.)	Palatine				
Mount Hope Cemetery	11500 S. Fairfield Ave., Chicago	1865	Nonsectarian		
Mount Hope Cemetery	Elgin				
Mount Isaiah Israel Cemetery (now Zion Gardens Cemetery)	6758 W. Addison St., Chicago	1886	Jewish		
Mount Mayriv Cemetery (now Zion Gardens Cemetery)	3600 N. Narragansett Ave., Chicago	1893	Jewish		
Mount Olive Cemetery	3800 N. Narragansett Ave., Chicago	1889	Primarily Scandinavian		
Mount Olivet Cemetery	2755 W. 111th St., Chicago	1855	Catholic		
Mount Vernon Memorial Park	Lemont				
New German Evangelical Zion Cemetery	Richton Park				
New Light Cemetery	6807 N. East Prairie Rd., Lincolnwood	1895	Jewish		
North Northfield Cemetery	Northbrook				
Northfield Oak Wood Cemetery	Glenview				
Northfield Union Cemetery	Northbrook				
Norwood Park Home Cemetery	Niles				
Oak Glen Lutheran Cemetery	Lansing				
Oak Hill Cemetery	Palos Park				
Oak Hill Cemetery	11900 Kedzie Ave., Blue Island	1902	Primarily Scandinavian		
Oak Ridge Cemetery	Westchester				
Oak Ridge Cemetery (Lansing)	Lansing				
Oakland Memory Lanes	15200 Lincoln Ave, Dolton				
Oakridge Cemetery	4301 West Roosevelt Road, Hillside	1899			
Oakwoods Cemetery	1035 E. 67th St., Chicago	1853			
Old German Methodist Cemetery	Orland Park				
Old Settlers Cemetery (Bohlander)	Berkeley				
Orland Memorial Park (Cooper Cem.)	Orland Park				
Our Lady of Sorrows Slovak Cemetery	Hillside	1923	Catholic		
Parkholm Cemetery	2501 N La Grange Rd, La Grange Park				
Queen of Heaven Cemetery	1400 S. Wolf Rd., Hillside	1947	Catholic		
Randhill Park Cemetery	1700 W. Rand Rd., Arlington Heights	1924			
Restvale Cemetery	Alsip				
Resurrection Cemetery	7201 Archer Rd., Justice	1907	Catholic		
Richton Cemetery (Christian Fellowship Churchyard)	Richton Park				
Ridgelawn Cemetery	5736 N. Pulaski Rd., Chicago	1895	Jewish		
Ridgewood Cemetery	Glenview				
Robinson Family Burial Ground	Norridge				
Rosehill Cemetery	5800 N. Ravenswood Ave., Chicago	1859			
Rosemont Park Cemetery (now Zion Gardens Cemetery)	3600 N. Narragansett Ave., Chicago	1933	Jewish		
Sacred Heart Cemetery	101st. St. and Kean Ave., Palos Hills	1872	Catholic		
Sacred Heart Cemetery	605 Lee Rd., Northbrook	1900	Catholic		
St. Adalbert Cemetery	6800 Milwaukee Ave., Niles	1872	Primarily Polish Catholic		
Saint Alphonsus	Lemont	1870	Catholic		
Saint Anne Catholic Cemetery	Park Forest	1865	Catholic		
Saint Benedict Cemetery	4600 W. 135th St., Crestwood	1885	Catholic		
Saint Boniface Cemetery	4901 N. Clark St., Chicago	1863	Primarily German Catholic		
Saint Casimir Lithuanian Cemetery	4401 W. 111th St., Chicago	1903	Primarily Lithuanian Catholic		
Saint Gabriel Cemetery	164th St. and Cicero Ave., Oak Forest	1913	Catholic (Potter's Field)		
Saint Henry Cemetery	Devon Ave. and Ridge Ave., Chicago	1863	Catholic, churchyard	41.997687°N 87.678438°W	
Saint James at Sag Bridge Catholic Church	Sag Bridge, Lemont	1837	Catholic		
Saint James Cemetery (Sauk Village)	Sauk Village	1847	Catholic		
Saint John Cemetery (Arlington Heights)	2200 E. Euclid Ave., Arlington Heights	1907	United Church of Christ (Protestant)		
Saint John's Evangelical Lutheran Church Cemetery	Schaumburg	1863	Lutheran		
Saint John's Lutheran Cemetery	6791 LaGrange Rd., Hodgkins	1897	Lutheran		
Saint Johns Cemetery	Country Club Hills	1850	Lutheran		
Saint John Cemetery (Glenview)	4400 Phillips, Glenview		Lutheran		
Saint Joseph Catholic Cemetery	3100 N. Thatcher Ave., River Grove	1904	Catholic		
Saint Joseph Catholic Cemetery (Wilmette)	Wilmette	1843	Catholic		
Saint Luke Cemetery	5300 N. Pulaski Rd., Chicago	1900	Lutheran		
Saint Marys Cemetery	87th St. and Hamlin Ave., Evergreen Park	1888	Catholic		
Saint Mary's Cemetery	Des Plaines	1883	Catholic		
Saint Mary's Cemetery (Divine Word)	1945 Waukegan Rd., Northbrook		Catholic		
Saint Matthew's Lutheran Cemetery	16125 W. 127th St., Lemont		Lutheran		
Saint Matthew's Lutheran Cemetery	8494 Shermer Rd., Niles	1840	Lutheran		
Saint Michael the Archangel Catholic Cemetery	1185 West Algonquin Rd., Palatine	1958	Catholic		
Saint Nicholas Cemetery	8901 W. Higgins Rd., Chicago	1925	Primarily Ukrainian Catholic		
Saint Paul Lutheran Cemetery	Matteson		Lutheran		
Saint Paul Lutheran Cemetery	101 N. Elmhurst Ave., Mount Prospect		Lutheran		
Saint Paul's Evangelical Lutheran Cemetery	Flossmoor		Lutheran		
Saint Paul's Lutheran Cemetery	8520 Harms Rd., Skokie		Lutheran		
Saint Peter Cemetery	2845 Shermer Rd., Northbrook				
Saint Peter Catholic Cemetery	8115 Niles Center Rd., Skokie	1863	Catholic		
Saint Peter Lutheran Cemetery	Schaumburg	1847	Lutheran		
Saint Peter Lutheran Cemetery	Arlington Heights		Lutheran		
Saint Peter's United Church of Christ Cemetery	8530 Harms Rd., Skokie	1880	United Church of Christ (Protestant)		
Saints Cyril and Methodius	Lemont	1888	Catholic		
Salem Cemetery	Palatine				
Sauerbier – Burkhardt Cemetery	Crestwood				
Shalom Memorial Park	1700 W. Rand Rd., Arlington Heights	1956	Jewish		
Sunset Memorial Lawns	3100 Shermer Rd., Northbrook	1890			
Sutherland (Sayles) Cemetery	Palatine	1840			
Thornton Township Cemetery	Thornton				
Town of Maine Cemetery	Park Ridge				
Trinity Lutheran Cemetery	Tinley Park				
Trinity Lutheran Cemetery	Willow Springs				
Union Ridge Cemetery	6700 W Higgins A, Chicago	1841			
German Waldheim Cemetery (Forest Home)	863 Des Plaines Ave., Forest Park	1873	Non-religious specific		
Waldheim Jewish Cemeteries (central div.), aka Waldheim Cemetery Company	1400 S. Des Plaines, Forest Park	1873	Jewish		
Waldheim Jewish Cemeteries (East), aka Waldheim Cemetery Company	Forest Park		Jewish		
Waldheim Jewish Cemeteries (West, incl. Joseph and Sons Inc.), aka Waldheim Cemetery Company	Berwyn area		Jewish		
Waldheim Jewish Cemeteries – Free Sons of Israel Cemetery, aka Waldheim Cemetery Company	Berwyn area	1874	Jewish		
Washington Memorial Gardens	Thornton				
Westlawn Cemetery	7801 W. Montrose Ave., Norridge	1937	Jewish	41.9577°N 87.8272°W	
Wheeling Cemetery	Wheeling				
Wolfrum Cemetery	Rolling Meadows				
Woodlawn Cemetery	7600 Cermak Rd., Forest Park	1912			
Wunders Cemetery	3963 N. Clark St., Chicago	1859	Primarily German Protestant (Lutheran)		
Zion Cemetery	Tinley Park				
Zion Lutheran Cemetery	Matteson				

== See also ==
- List of cemeteries in Illinois
