= Homewood Memorial Gardens =

Privately owned cemetery

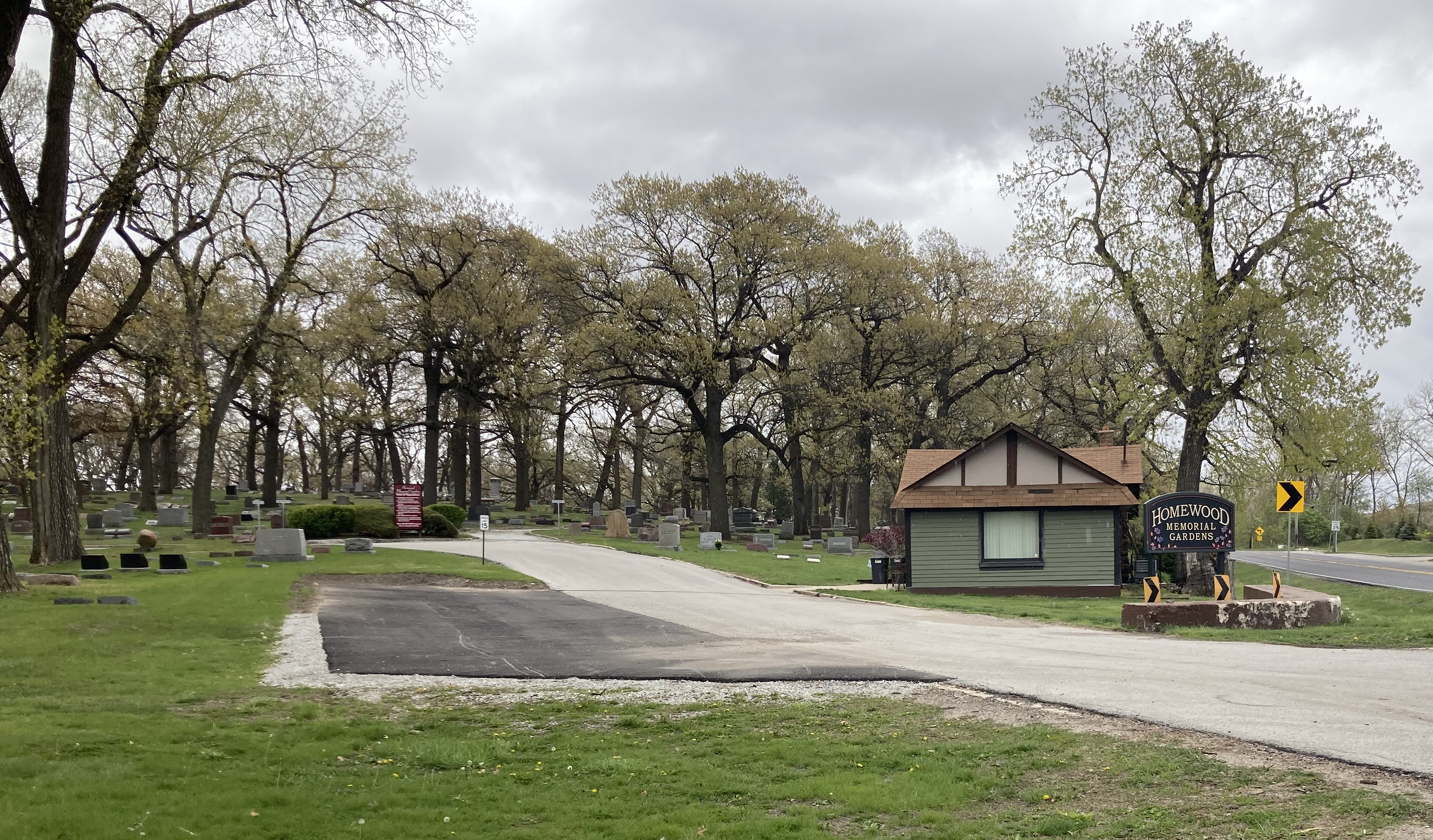
- Interactive map of Homewood Memorial Gardens

Details
- Location: Homewood, Illinois
- Country: United States
- Coordinates: 41.5658°N 87.6289°W
- Find a Grave: Homewood Memorial Gardens

Homewood Memorial Gardens is a privately owned cemetery in unincorporated Cook County, Illinois. Many other unrelated cemeteries share variations of this name. This site may have formerly been called Oak Lawn Cemetery.

== Potters' Field ==
The cemetery long served as Cook County's potter's field, providing interment for indigents and unclaimed bodies. Press reports in 2011 speculated the cemetery might have as many as eight thousand such bodies, many in mass graves. Indigent and unclaimed bodies were buried at Homewood Memorial Gardens from 1980-2012. Since then, Cook County indigent remains are now buried at Mount Olivet Catholic Cemetery in Chicago.
