= Presidential Towers =

Apartment complex in Chicago, Illinois

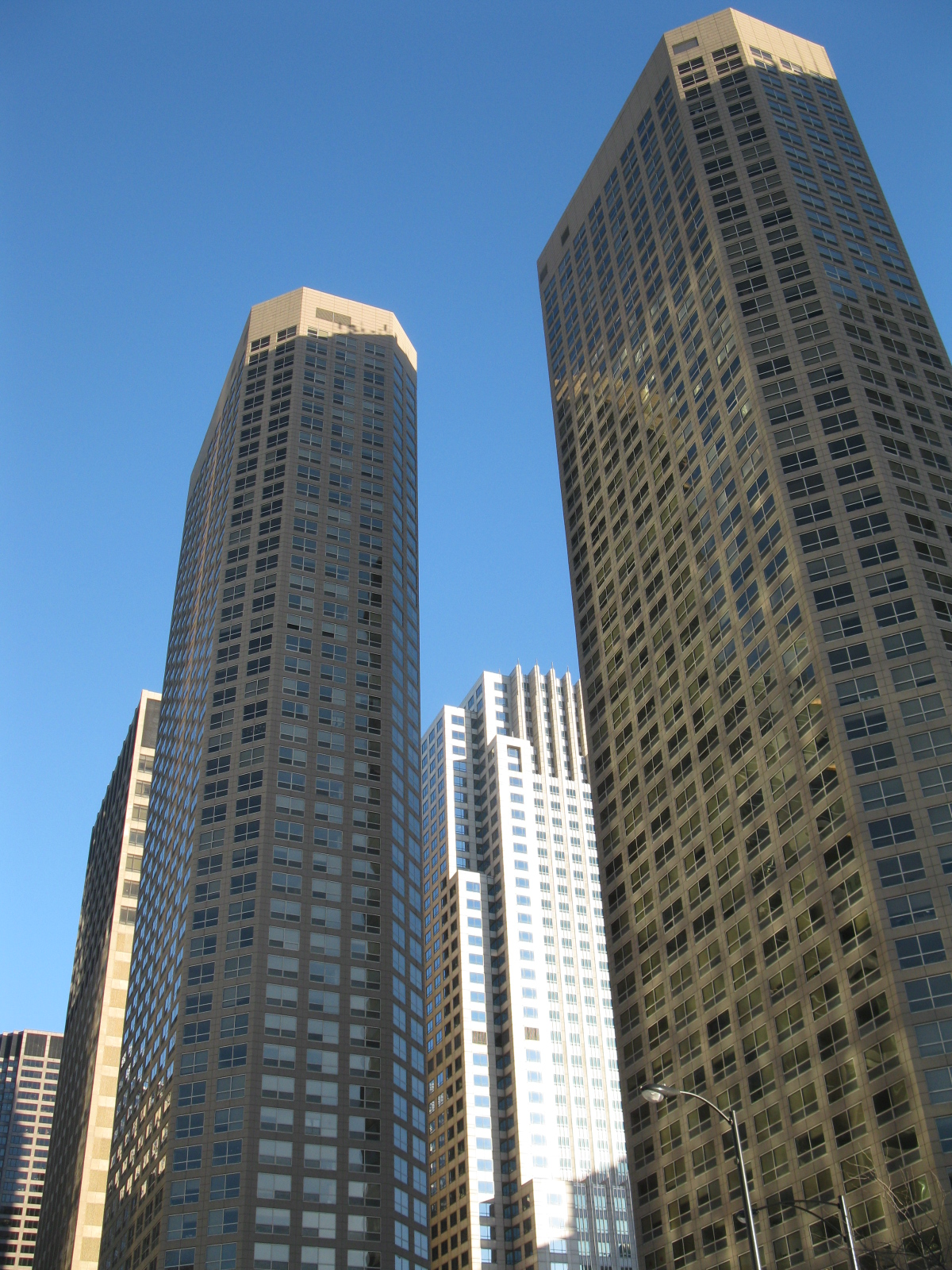
- Interactive map of the Presidential Towers area

General information
- Status: Completed
- Type: Skyscraper
- Location: West Loop, 555 W. Madison St., Chicago, United States
- Coordinates: 41.8814362°N 87.6426838°W
- Construction started: 1984
- Completed: 1986
- Owner: Waterton Associates

Height
- Height: 461 feet (141 m)

Technical details
- Floor count: 196 (49 per tower)
- Floor area: 2,700,000 square feet (250,000 m^{2})

Design and construction
- Architecture firm: Solomon Cordwell Buenz & Associates
- Developer: Daniel Levin, James McHugh, and Daniel Shannon
- Main contractor: James McHugh Construction Co
- Awards and prizes: LEED Silver Certification

Other information
- Number of units: 2346
- Parking: 1162 spaces

Website
- presidentialtowersapts.com

Presidential Towers is a multi-tower residential apartment complex built in 1986 and located in Chicago, Illinois at 555 W. Madison. Bounded by Madison, Monroe, Clinton, and Desplaines streets, the property covers two full blocks in the West Loop neighborhood.

Built in what was once the skid row area of Chicago, the complex received over $100 million in direct investment and waived Federal, state and city revenues to get built, including the then-largest guarantee from the Federal Housing Administration. Occupancy struggles in the late 1980s resulted in the complex going into default in the early 1990s.

The complex is composed of four 49-story residential skyscrapers sitting atop a four-story, 1162-space parking garage and 135,193 square foot (12,559.8 m^{2}) retail base. The towers are all staggered in their placement upon the site to maximize skyline views of the nearby Chicago Loop and surrounding neighborhoods for each of the 2346 apartment units. The complex was built in an area once known as Chicago's skid row and was designed to be a self-contained community with an inward-facing mall located within the towers' base.

Waterton Associates purchased Presidential Towers in 2007 from Pritzker Realty Group and began plans for a comprehensive renovation. Work to date has included updating living units and common areas, and adding street front access to the ground floor retail space.

Presidential Towers has hosted an annual "Fight for Air Climb" stair climb since 2009 and was awarded a 2014 Impact Award by the American Lung Association of Greater Chicago. In 2015, it became the largest residential property in Chicago to implement a 100% smoke-free policy.
