= Mount Olivet Cemetery (Chicago) =

Cemetery in Chicago, Illinois

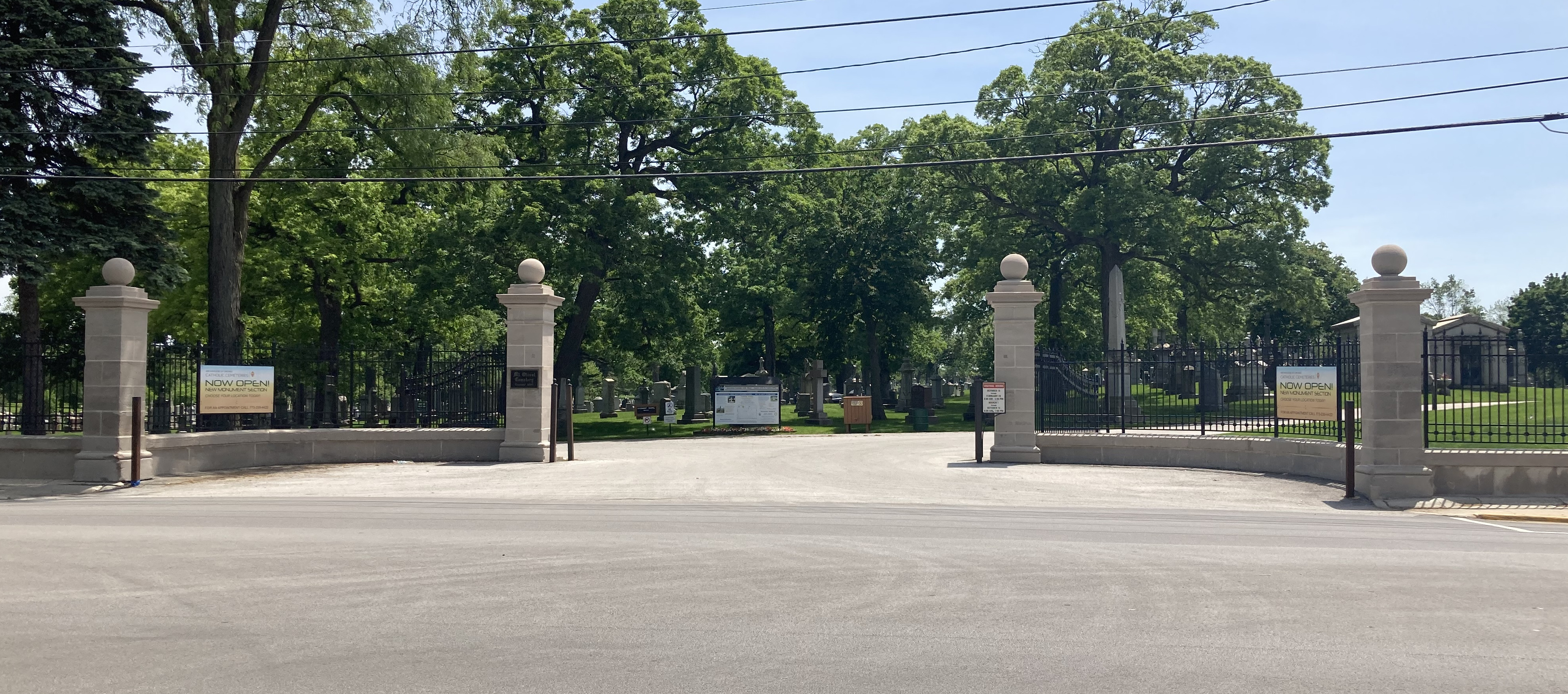
- Interactive map of Mount Olivet Cemetery

Details
- Established: 1885
- Location: Chicago, Illinois
- Country: United States
- Coordinates: 41°41′17″N 87°41′34″W
- Type: Roman Catholic
- Owned by: Archdiocese of Chicago
- Size: 93 acres (38 ha)
- No. of graves: 142,200
- Website: website
- Find a Grave: Mount Olivet Cemetery

Mount Olivet Cemetery is a Roman Catholic cemetery located in Chicago, Illinois. The cemetery is operated by the Archdiocese of Chicago. The cemetery is located at 2755 West 111th Street.

== History ==
Mount Olivet was consecrated in 1885, and was the first Catholic cemetery to be established in the south side of Chicago. There are over 142,200 people buried at the cemetery, with over 150 annual interments. The cemetery is 93 acres (38 ha) in size. It became one of the first major area cemeteries to become full, until the purchase and development of additional lands along what had been the eastern border of the cemetery.

Mount Olivet was the original burial location of Al Capone, who was laid to rest between the graves of his father and brother. A few years after his death, the remains of all three men were moved to Mount Carmel Cemetery in Hillside, Illinois upon the death of Capone's mother.

Since 2012, the remains of indigent and unidentified deceased people of Cook County have been buried at Mount Olivet.

== Notable burials ==
- James Bell, Sgt. during Battle of Little Big Horn
- Al Capone, gangster (remains later moved to Mount Carmel Cemetery, Hillside, Illinois)
- Zachary Taylor Davis, architect of Comiskey Park and Wrigley Field
- Thomas A. Doyle, U.S. Congressman
- Charles Martin, U.S. Congressman
- Lawrence E. McGann, U.S. Congressman
- M. Alfred Michaelson, U.S. Congressman
- P. H. Moynihan, U.S. Congressman
- Catherine O'Leary, owner of cow that allegedly started the Great Chicago Fire
- Daniel Ryan Sr., politician who served as president of the Cook County Board of Commissioners
- Victims of the Iroquois Theatre Fire (1903)
- Victims of the Eastland Disaster (1915)
- One British Commonwealth war grave of a Canadian soldier of World War I

== See also ==
- List of cemeteries in Cook County, Illinois
