= St. Henry Cemetery =

Cemetery in Chicago

St. Henry Catholic Cemetery
- Interactive map of St. Henry Catholic Cemetery

Details
- Established: 1863
- Location: Devon and Ridge Avenues, Chicago, Illinois
- Country: United States
- Coordinates: 41°59′51″N 87°40′43″W
- Owned by: Roman Catholic Archdiocese of Chicago
- Size: more than 2 acres (0.81 ha)
- No. of interments: more than 3,000
- Website: www.catholiccemeterieschicago.org/locations/st-henry/
- Find a Grave: St. Henry Catholic Cemetery

St. Henry Catholic Cemetery is a Roman Catholic cemetery located in Chicago, Illinois. It is bordered by Devon Avenue on the north, near its intersection with Ridge Avenue.

== History ==
The cemetery is named for Saint Henry, for whom the adjacent church was originally named. It is the only churchyard in the city of Chicago.

Robert Rueckheim (1913–1920), the "Sailor Jack" on Cracker Jack boxes, is buried here.
