= Mount Olive =

Mount Olive may refer to:

== Places ==
=== Canada ===
- Mount Olive, an area of the neighborhood of Smithfield, Toronto
  - Mount Olive station, a station on the Line 6 Finch West serving the aforementioned neighborhood
- Mount Olive (Canadian Rockies), a mountain on the British Columbia-Alberta border

=== United States ===
- Mount Olive, Alabama (disambiguation)
- Mount Olive, Arkansas (disambiguation)
- Mount Olive, Illinois, a city in Macoupin County
- Mount Olive Township, Macoupin County, Illinois
- Mount Olive, Indiana, an unincorporated community
- Mount Olive, Kentucky, an unincorporated community
- Mount Olive, Mississippi, a town
- Mount Olive, Missouri, an unincorporated community
- Mount Olive Township, New Jersey
  - Mount Olive station, an NJ Transit station
- Mount Olive, North Carolina, a town
  - Mount Olive Municipal Airport
- Mount Olive, Stokes County, North Carolina, an unincorporated community
- Mount Olive, Ohio, an unincorporated community
- Mount Olive, Virginia, a census-designated place
- Mount Olive, West Virginia (disambiguation), various unincorporated communities
- Mount Olive Cemetery (disambiguation)
- Mount Olive Correctional Complex, Mount Olive, Fayette County, West Virginia, the men's maximum security prison for the state of West Virginia

== Buildings on the United States National Register of Historic Places ==
- Mount Olive (Natchez, Mississippi), a historic house
- Mount Olive Cathedral, Memphis, Tennessee
- Mount Olive African Methodist Episcopal Church, Clearwater, Florida
- Mount Olive Baptist Church (disambiguation)
- Mount Olive Cumberland Presbyterian Church, Mount Olive, Izard County, Arkansas
- Mount Olive United Methodist Church, Mobile, Alabama

== Schools ==
- University of Mount Olive, a private school in Mount Olive, North Carolina
  - Mount Olive Trojans, the athletics teams of the university
- Mount Olive High School (disambiguation), various American schools
- Mount Olive English Secondary School, a high school in Siddhipur, Nepal

== Other uses ==
- Mt. Olive Pickle Company, a food processing firm in Mount Olive, North Carolina

== See also ==
- Mount of Olives, a mountain ridge near Jerusalem's Old City, associated with Jesus and Mary
- Mountolive, a 1958 novel by Lawrence Durrell
- Mount Olivet (disambiguation)
