= Imadol =

Imadol इमाडोल
- Municipality of Mahalaxmi Municipality
- Location in Nepal
- Coordinates: 27.66°N 85.35°E
- Country: Nepal
- Province: Province No. 3
- District: Lalitpur

Population (2012)
  - Total: 27,327
- Time zone: UTC+5:45 (Nepal Time)
- Postal code: 44705
- Area code: 01

Imadol (Nepali: इमाडोल) is a residential area located in the southeastern quarter of Lalitpur District. It was formerly a Village Development Committee that is now part of Mahalaxmi Municipality in Province No. 3 of central Nepal. At the time of the 2011 Nepal census it had a population of 27,327 living in 6,898 individual households. Until 2015, Imadol was a Village Development Committee. Imadol borders Lalitpur Metropolitan City (Patan) to the northwest, Greater Kathmandu to the north, Madhyapur Thimi to the northeast, Tikathali to the east, Sidhdipur to the southeast, Harisiddhi to the south and Dhapakhel to the southwest. Historians have documented that Imadol was visited by Emperor Ashoka in ancient times and his influence can be seen in the Ashoka stupas in the area.

== Economy ==
Agricultural farming used to be important to the local economy. In the early 1990s the Janajagriti programme improved the water supply and sanitation in the area and over a period of two years, three water tanks and four wells were constructed, benefiting some 135 households. However, with the expansion of the city lately, a lot of local business including hardware shops, retail outlets and small eateries have emerged.

There are a lot of brick factories located in Imadol.Around 2000, with the settlements increasing near the brick kilns, the government has ordered the kilns to shift outside the Kathmandu Valley by the end of 2016. Currently, the bricks are supplied to the construction sites as ordered by the customers.

== Notable landmarks ==
Imadol hosts the KIST Medical College and Hospital, established in 2006. Notable landmarks include the Ashok Thur, Shiva Temple and Krishna Mandir along the main road (Gwarko-Lamatar Road) and Saraswati Mandir. The VDC also has two historical ponds, including Kamalpokhari located near the Eastern edge of the VDC and Bojhepokhari which is located around the North border.

Birds: There are various kinds of birds found in this area like kingfisher, Eurasian golden oriole, black drongo, little grebe, sandpiper, hoopoe. Some places near the Harisiddhi border also serves as a habitat of the long tailed blackbird and cranes.

== See also ==
Lubhu
