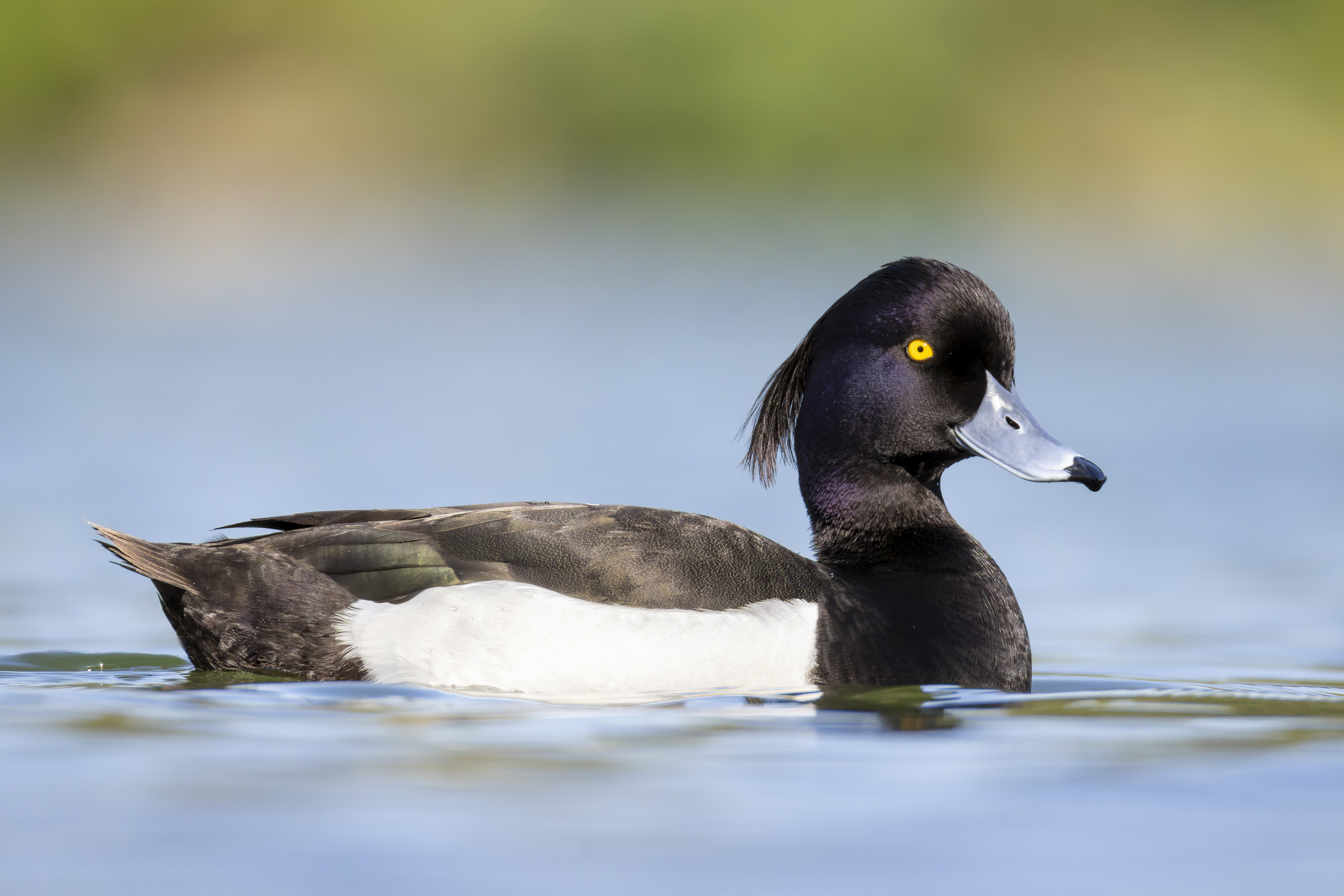
- Male
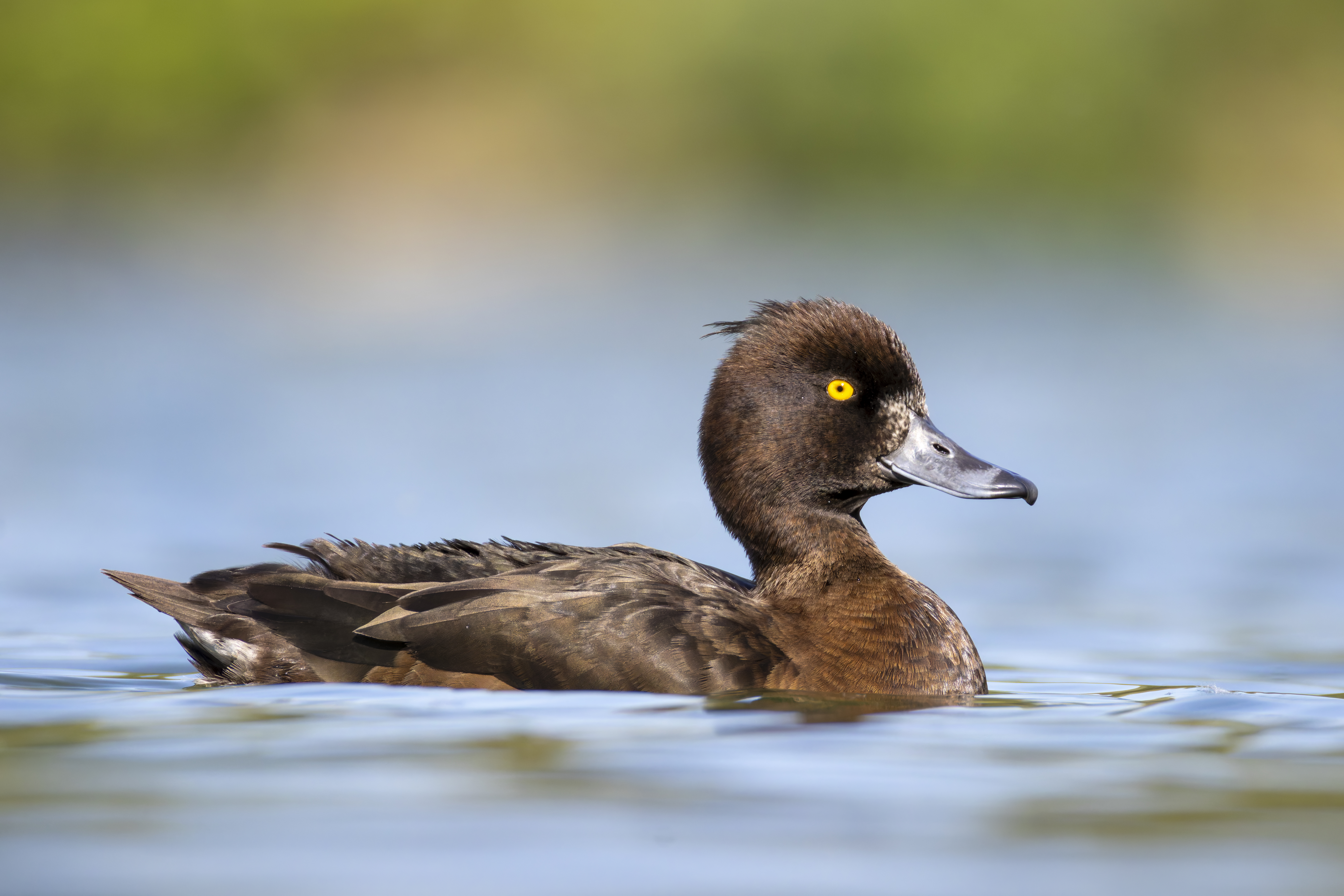
- Female Sounds

Conservation status
- Least Concern (IUCN 3.1) (Global)

- Near Threatened (IUCN 3.1) (Europe)

Scientific classification
- Kingdom: Animalia
- Phylum: Chordata
- Class: Aves
- Order: Anseriformes
- Family: Anatidae
- Genus: Aythya
- Species: A. fuligula

Binomial name
- Aythya fuligula (Linnaeus, 1758)
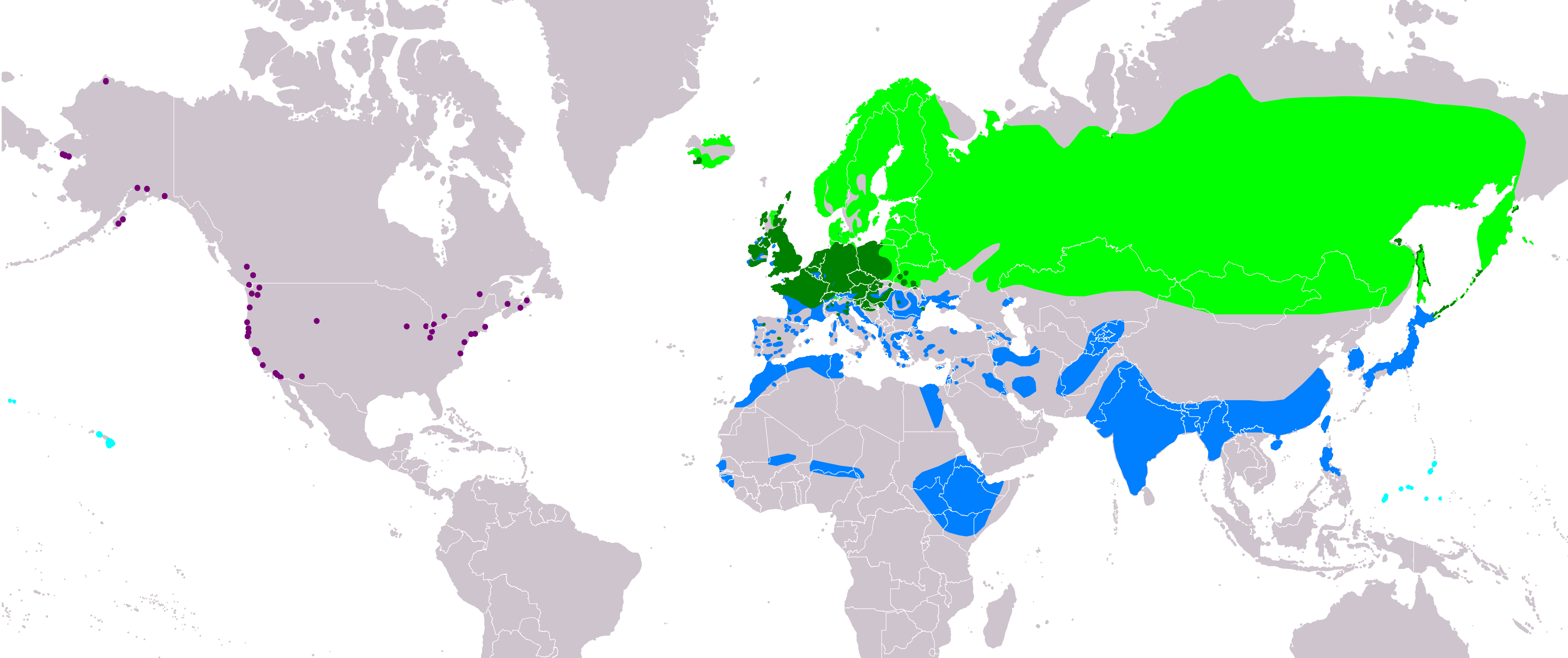
- Global distribution map Year-Round Range Summer Range Winter Range

Synonyms
- Anas fuligula Linnaeus, 1758

= Tufted duck =

Species of bird

Tufted duck

The tufted duck (or tufted pochard) (Aythya fuligula) is a small diving duck with a population of nearly one million birds, found in northern Eurasia. They are partially migratory. The scientific name is derived from Ancient Greek aithuia, an unidentified seabird mentioned by authors such as Hesychius and Aristotle, and Latin fuligo 'soot' and gula 'throat'. It is a game bird.

== Taxonomy ==
The tufted duck was formally described in 1758 by the Swedish naturalist Carl Linnaeus in the tenth edition of his Systema Naturae under the binomial name Anas fuligula. He cited the Swiss naturalist Conrad Gessner who in 1555 had used the identical name Anas fuligula in his Historiae animalium. Linnaeus specified the type locality as Europe but in 1761 restricted it to Sweden. The tufted duck is now one of 12 species placed in the genus Aythya that was introduced in 1822 by the German naturalist Friedrich Boie. The genus name is from Ancient Greek aithuia, an unidentified seabird mentioned by Aristotle, Hesychius and other authors. The specific epithet fuligula combines Latin meaning "soot" and gula meaning "throat". The species is monotypic: no subspecies are recognised. An alternative common name is "tufted pochard".

== Description ==
The adult male is all black except for white flanks and a blue-grey bill with golden yellow eyes, along with a thin crest on the back of the head. It has a prominent tuft on its head, which gives the species its name. The adult female is brown with lighter flanks, and is more easily confused with other diving ducks. In particular, some have white around the base of the bill, resembling the scaup species, although the white is never as extensive as that of those ducks. The female's call is a harsh, growling "karr", usually given in flight. Males are mostly silent but will whistle during courtship, based on a simple "wit-oo".

The only ducks that are similar are the greater scaup and lesser scaup, but these species lack the tuft and emit a different call.

The tufted duck is one of the species to which the Agreement on the Conservation of African-Eurasian Migratory Waterbirds (AEWA) applies.

Refer to the following table for measurements of the tufted duck:

Tufted duck measurements
Measurement	Male	Female
Range of mass	753–1026.2 g	629–906.8 g
Average of mass	889.6 g	768.3 g
Range of length	40.6-45.7 cm	40.6-45.7 cm
Average of length	43.2 cm	43.2 cm
Range of wingspan	51.3-53.8 cm	49.3-52,6 cm

== Distribution and habitat ==
The tufted duck breeds throughout temperate and northern Eurasia. It occasionally can be found as a winter visitor along both coasts of the United States and Canada. It is believed to have expanded its traditional range with the increased availability of open water due to gravel extraction, and the spread of freshwater mussels, a favourite food. These ducks are migratory in most of their range, and overwinter in the milder south and west of Europe, southern Asia and all year in the British Isles. One individual has been reported as far south as Melbourne, Australia. They form large flocks on open water in winter.

Their breeding habitat is close to marshes and lakes with plenty of vegetation to conceal the nest. They are also found on coastal lagoons, shorelines and sheltered ponds.

== Behaviour and ecology ==
=== Breeding ===
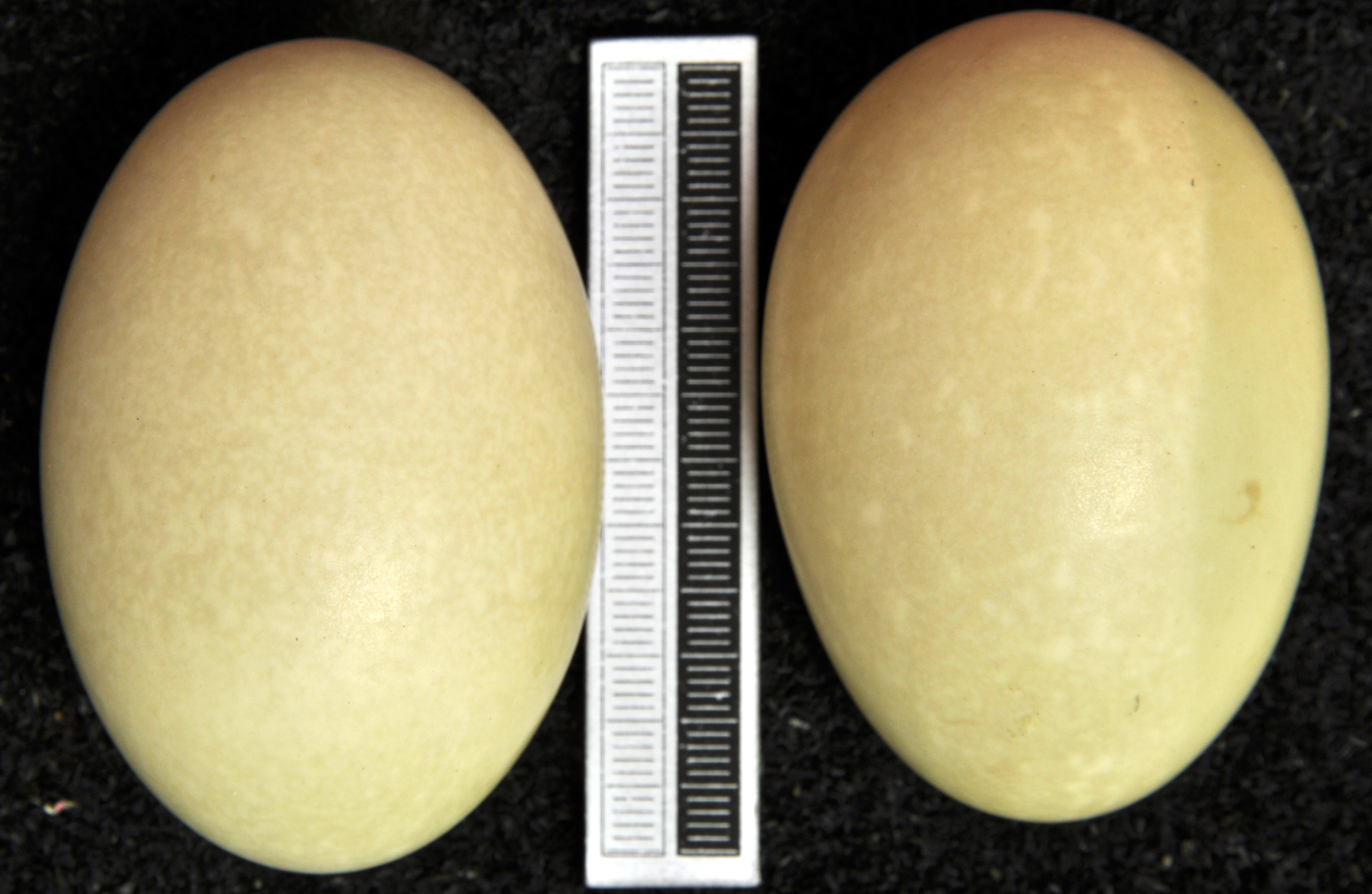
Eggs in the collection of Museum Wiesbaden

In northern Europe breeding takes place between mid May and the end of July. They are not colonial but sometimes the nests can be in a loose group. Most nests are placed beside water; an island site is preferred. The nest is built by the female and consists of depression in the ground that is lined with grass, reeds and down. The clutch consists of 8–11 greenish-grey eggs that measure 59 mm × 41 mm (2.3 in × 1.6 in). They are incubated by the female starting after the clutch is complete so that they hatch synchronously. The female covers the eggs with down when she is away from the nest. The eggs hatch after around 25 days (range 23–28 days). The young are precocial and nidifugous. They can feed themselves and are cared for by the female who broods them when they are small. They typically fledge when aged between 45 and 50 days. Tufted ducks usually first breed at one year but occasionally at 2 years.

=== Food and feeding ===
These birds feed mainly by diving, but they will sometimes upend from the surface. They eat molluscs, aquatic insects and some plants and sometimes feed at night.

== Hunting ==
They are hunted as sport in the UK, Italy, Iran, Finland and Denmark, and commercially in Iran. Eggs used to be (and maybe continue to be) gathered in Iceland. Because it feeds on the water bottom, it can taste "muddy" and is considered a less tasty duck.

== Gallery ==
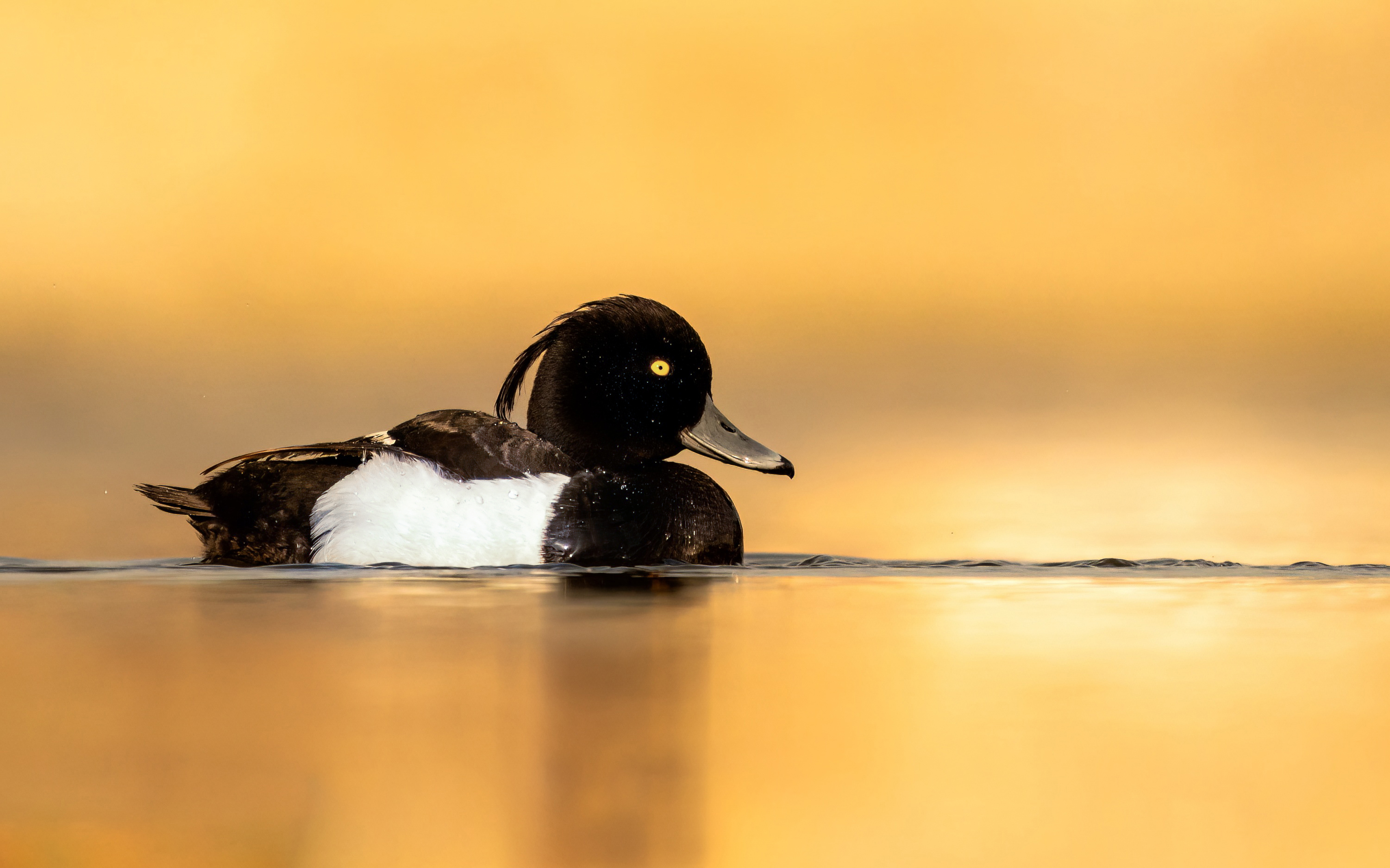
Male at Nagdaha, Nepal

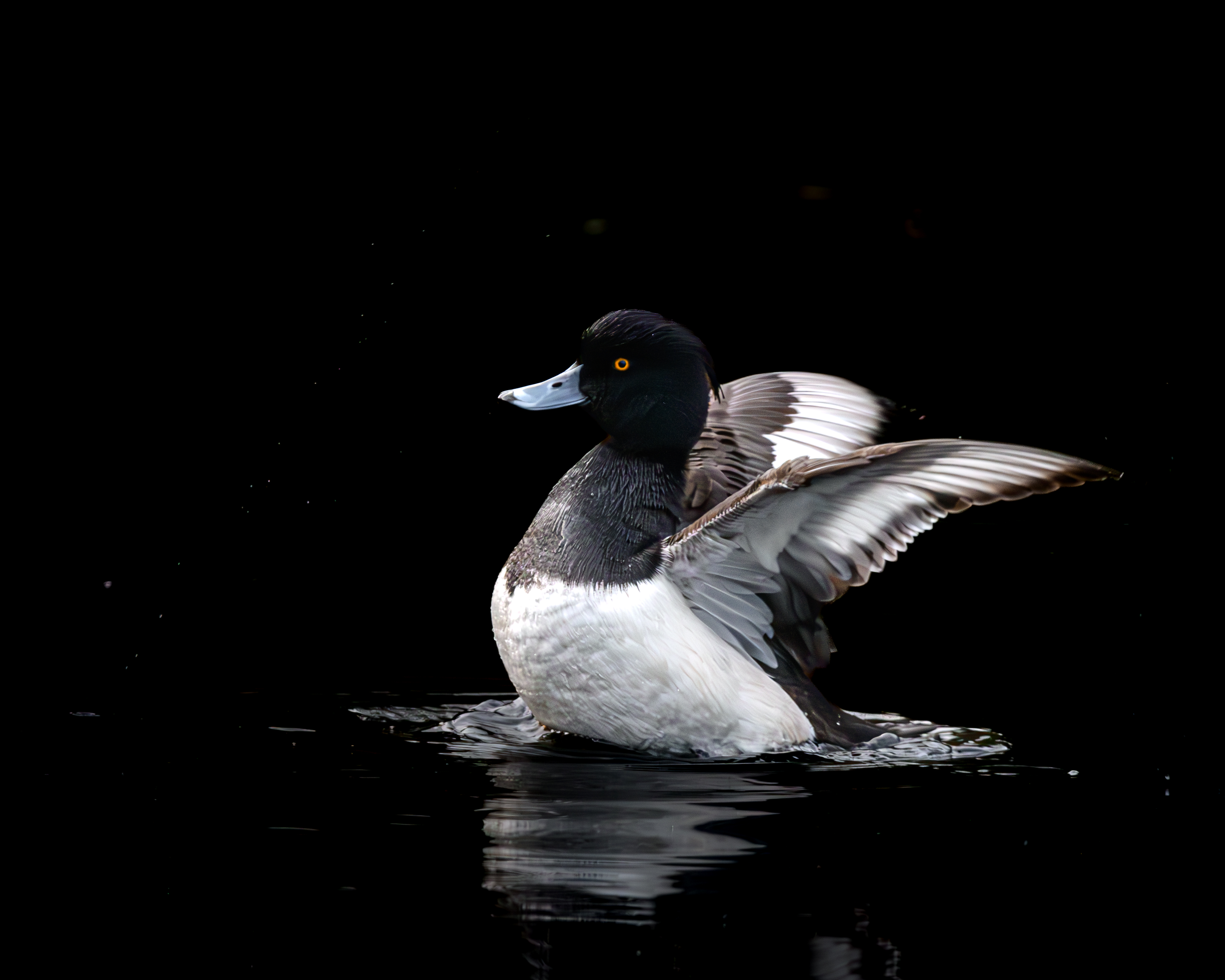
Adult male, Vrouwenpolder, Netherlands

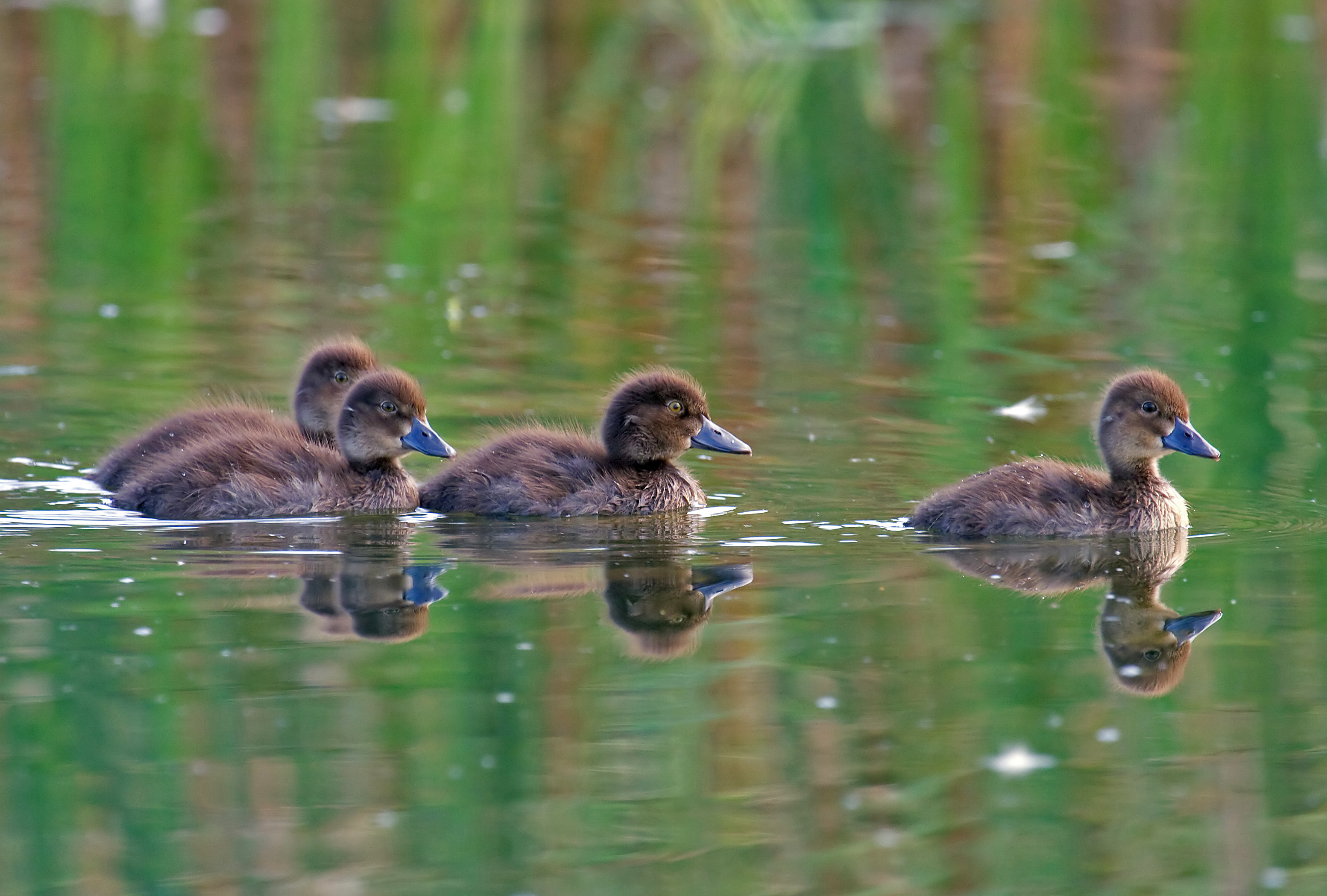
Ducklings

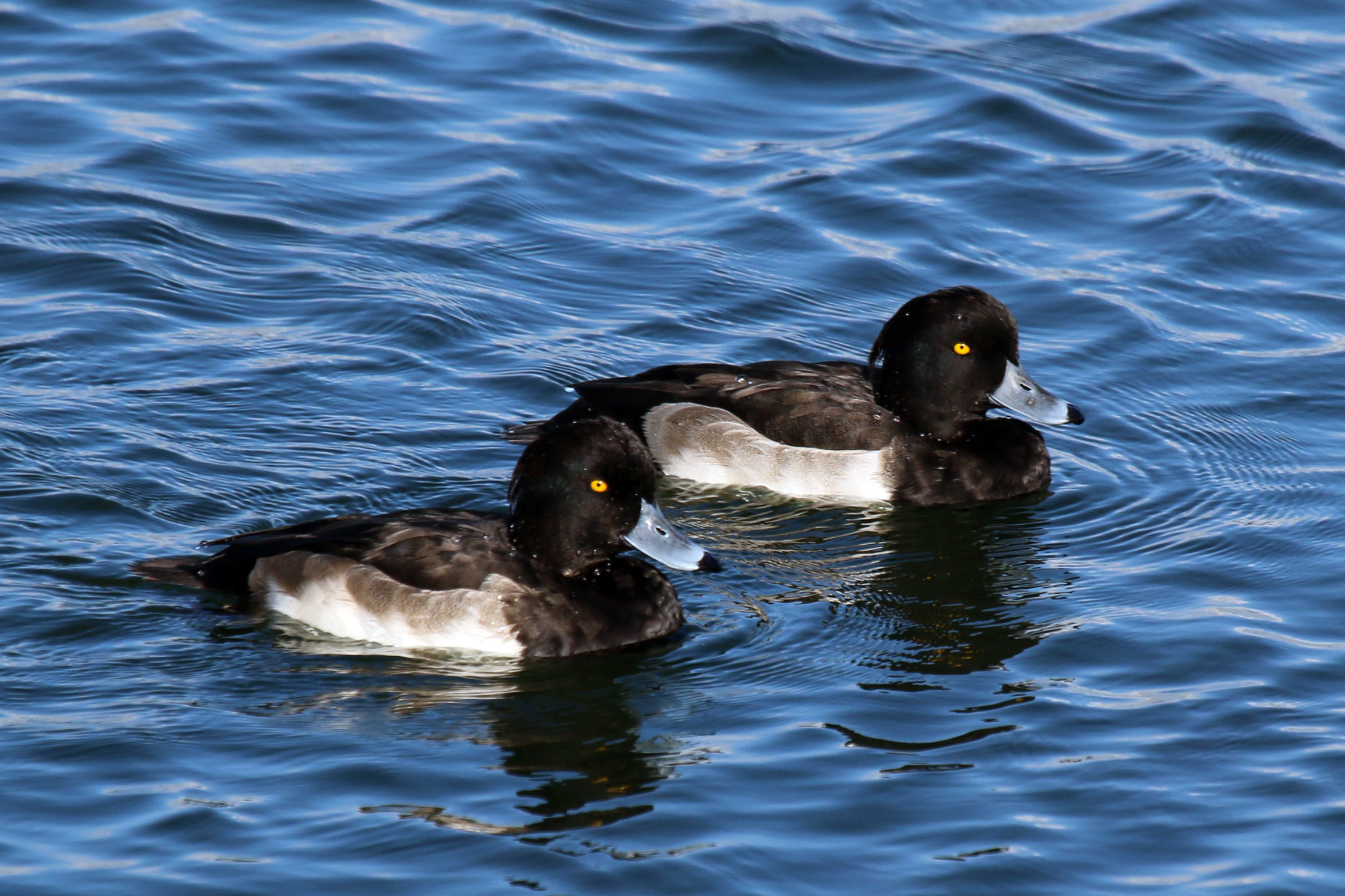
Males in eclipse plumage, Farmoor Reservoir, Oxfordshire

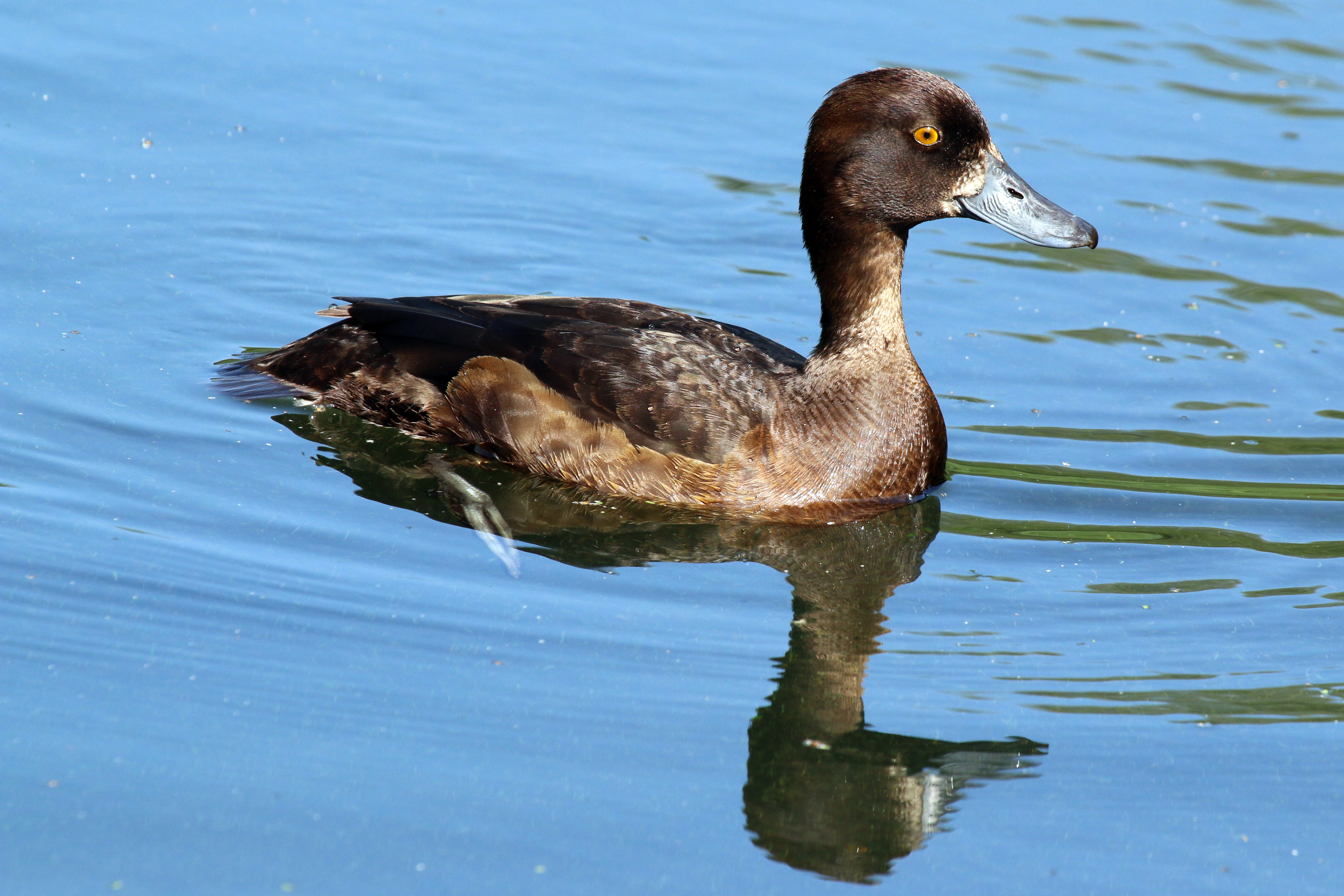
Female, WWT London Wetland Centre

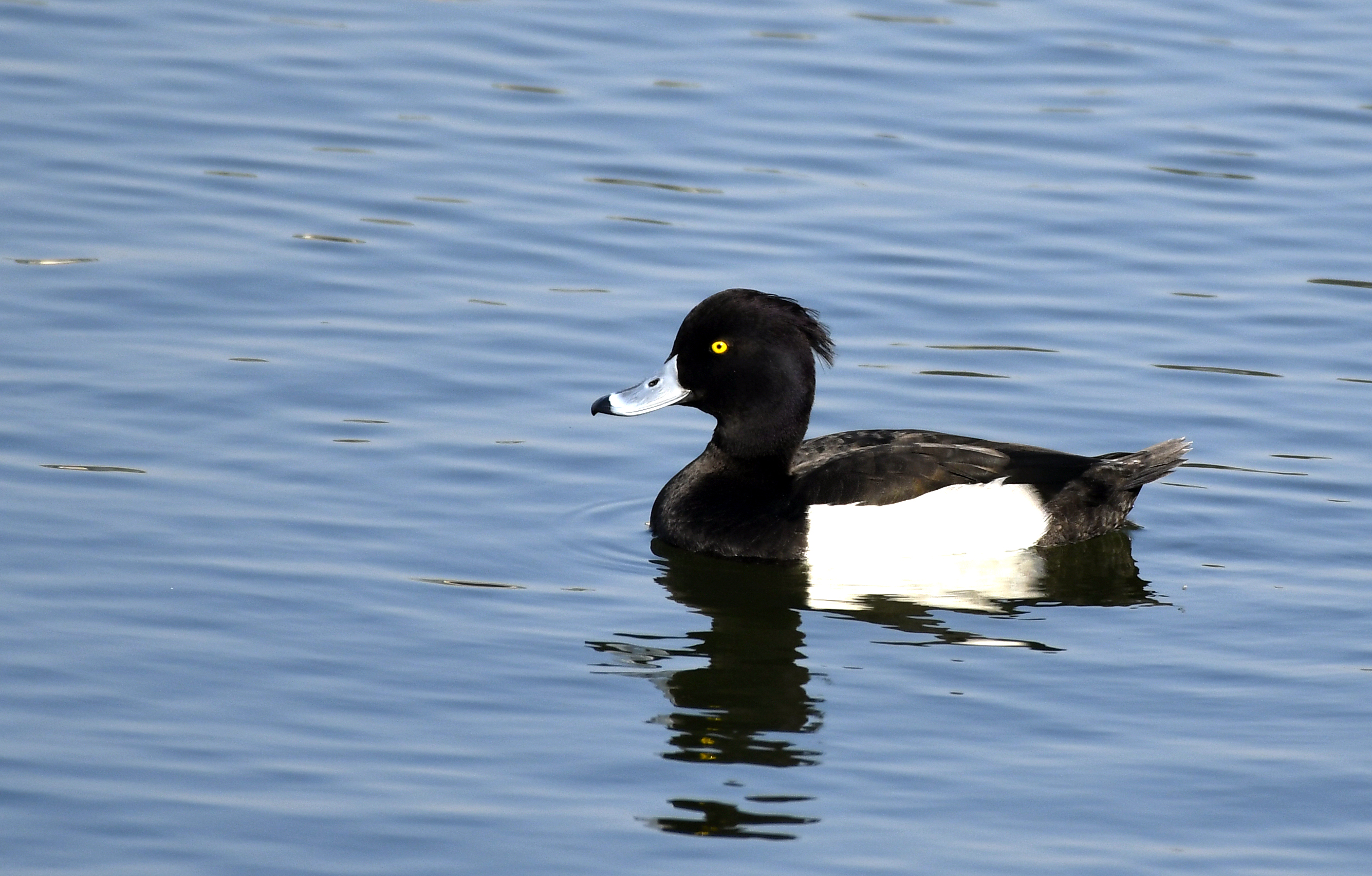
Male at Jamnagar, India

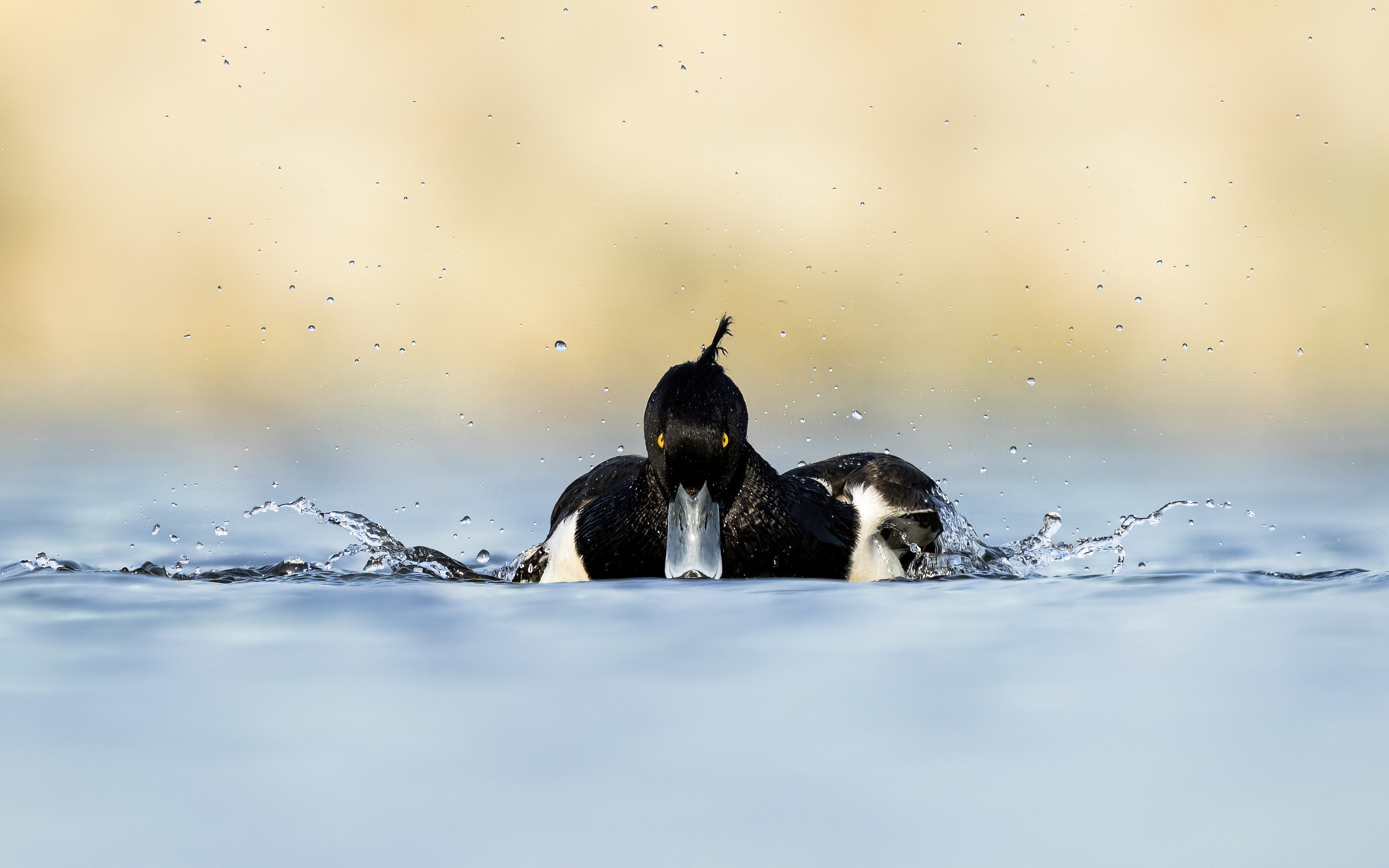
A tufted duck swimming in Nagadaha lake, Lalitpur, Nepal

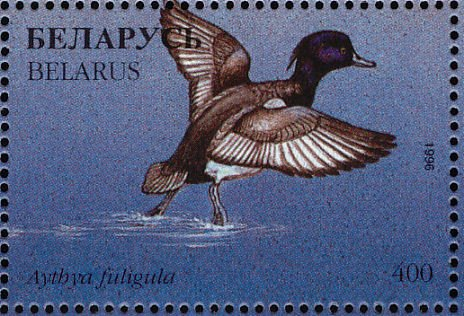
Tufted duck on stamp of Belarus, 1996.

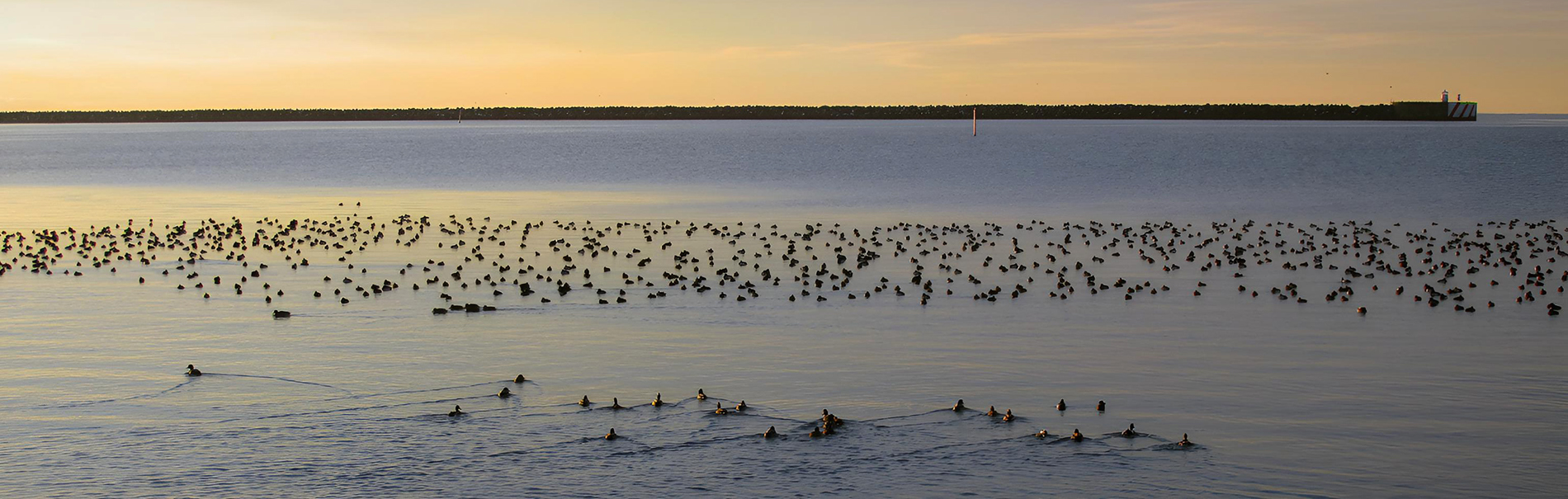
Flock of 2000 tufted ducks in Ystad port, Sweden

== Sources ==
- Cramp, Stanley, ed. (1977). "Aythya fuliga Tufted duck". Handbook of the Birds of Europe the Middle East and North Africa. The Birds of the Western Palearctic. Vol. I: Ostrich to Ducks. Oxford: Oxford University Press. pp. 577–586. ISBN 978-0-19-857358-6.
