= Mount Olivet (disambiguation) =

Mount Olivet, or the Mount of Olives, is in East Jerusalem.

Mount Olivet may also refer to:

- Mount Olivet, Kentucky, United States
- Mount Olivet, Marshall County, West Virginia
- Mount Olivet, Preston County, West Virginia

== See also ==
- Mount Olivet Cemetery (disambiguation)
- Mount Olive (disambiguation)
