= Mount Olive, West Virginia =

Mount Olive, West Virginia may refer to:

- Mount Olive, Fayette County, West Virginia, an unincorporated community in Fayette County
- Mount Olive, Mason County, West Virginia, an unincorporated community in Mason County
- Mount Olive, Mercer County, West Virginia, an unincorporated community in Mercer County
- Mount Olive, Roane County, West Virginia, an unincorporated community in Roane County
