= Mahalaxmi, Lalitapur =

Mahalaxmi महालक्ष्मी
- Municipality (नगरपालिका)
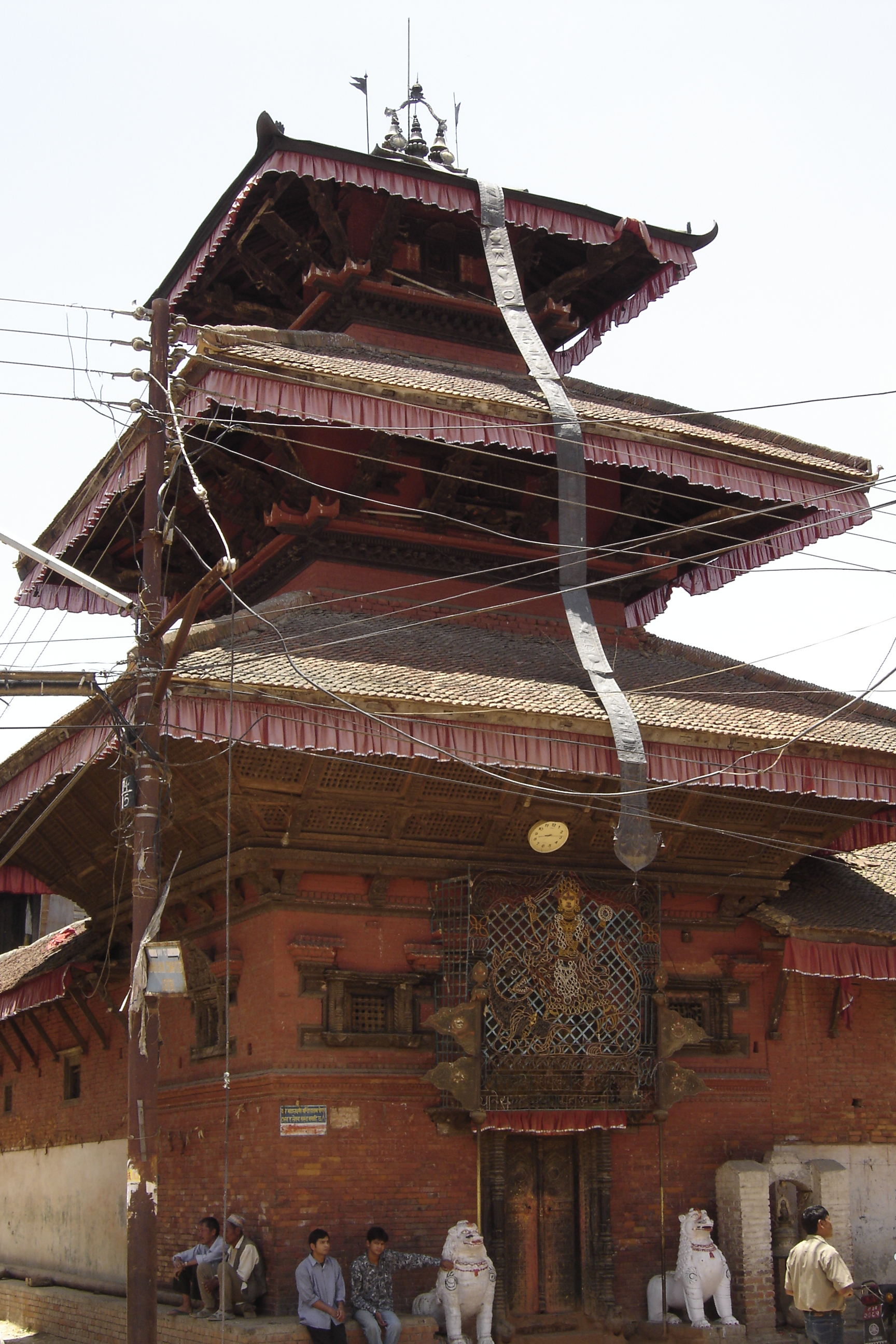
- The Mahalakshmi - Mahabhairav Temple in Lubhu

- Location in Nepal Mahalaxmi (Nepal)
- Country: Nepal
- Province: Bagmati
- District: Lalitpur
- Established: March 2017

Government
  - Mayor: Harigovinda Shrestha (CPN UML)
  - Deputy Mayor: Laxmi Maharjan (NC)
  - Socialist: Susan Maharjan

Area
  - Total: 26.51 km^{2} (10.24 sq mi)

Population (2011 Nepal census)
  - Total: 62,172
  - Density: 2,345.22/km^{2} (6,074.1/sq mi)
- Website: mahalaxmimun.gov.np

Mahalaxmi is a municipality that lies in the north-eastern part of the Lalitpur district of Nepal. As per the declaration by the government of Nepal in 2015, it was created through the merger of the Village development committees Imadol, Lubhu, Tikathali, Siddhipur and Lamatar. The city derives its name from the Mahalaxmi-Mahabhairav Temple in Lubhu. The city's total area is 26.5 square kilometres. The municipality has a total number of 10 wards. The old VDC offices are used as joint ward office now .

== Name ==
Mahalaxmi means Great Lakhsmi (Hindu Goddess) in Sanskrit but with a Nepalized Translation as Nepal is the largest Hindu country by percentage of population adherence in the World. According to the 2011 census, the Hindu population in Nepal is estimated to be around 21,551,492, which accounts for at least 81.34% of the country's population out of 28,095,714. Hinduism arrive in Nepal somewhere in the c. 250 CE but vehemently extended to all of Nepal with Shankara and Prithvi's effort.

== Demographics ==
At the time of the 2011 Nepal census, Mahalaxmi Municipality had a population of 62,624. Of these, 58.5% spoke Nepali, 26.6% Newar, 6.5% Tamang, 2.1% Maithili, 1.4% Magar, 1.0% Rai, 0.8% Tharu, 0.6% Bhojpuri, 0.4% Limbu, 0.2% Gurung, 0.2% Hindi, 0.2% Sunwar, 0.2% Urdu, 0.2% Wambule, 0.1% Chamling, 0.1% Doteli, 0.1% Sherpa, 0.1% Thulung and 0.2% other languages as their first language.

In terms of ethnicity/caste, 31.0% were Newar, 28.7% Chhetri, 13.5% Hill Brahmin, 7.9% Tamang, 4.7% Magar, 2.4% Rai, 1.4% Kami, 1.4% Tharu, 0.9% Sarki, 0.7% Damai/Dholi, 0.7% Thakuri, 0.6% Limbu, 0.6% Musalman, 0.5% Gurung, 0.5% Sanyasi/Dasnami, 0.4% other Dalit, 0.4% Gharti/Bhujel, 0.3% Teli, 0.3% other Terai, 0.3% Yadav, 0.2% Lohar, 0.2% Majhi, 0.2% Sunuwar, 0.1% Bengali, 0.1% Terai Brahmin, 0.1% Chamling, 0.1% Danuwar, 0.1% Dhanuk, 0.1% Ghale, 0.1% Hajam/Thakur, 0.1% Kalwar, 0.1% Kathabaniyan, 0.1% Kayastha, 0.1% Koiri/Kushwaha, 0.1% Rajbanshi, 0.1% Sherpa, 0.1% Sudhi, 0.1% Thami and 0.3% others.

In terms of religion, 85.6% were Hindu, 8.3% Buddhist, 4.1% Christian, 1.1% Kirati, 0.7% Muslim, 0.1% Prakriti and 0.2% others.

In terms of literacy, 82.1% could read and write, 1.9% could only read and 15.8% could neither read nor write.

== Education ==
There are many reputed education institutions in this metropolis :

- Mahalaxmi secondary school, Lubhu
- Genius IB World School, Lubhu
- United School, Imadol
- Shuvatara School, Lamatar
- Suryodaya Sai Secondary School, Imadol
- Nepal Don Bosco School, Siddhipur
- Pawan Prakriti H.S, Imadol
- Children Garden School, Imadol
- Anant English School, Siddhipur
- Lalit Academy, Siddhipur
- Kopila English School, Siddhipur
- Mount Olive English Secondary School, Siddhipur
- Siddhimangal Higher Secondary School, Siddhipur
- Bhanodaya Primary School, Siddhipur
- High View School, Tikathali
- Balkunja Secondary School, Changathali
- West Wing School, Lubhu
- Aster Academy, Imadol
- NavaKunja School, Siddhipur
- Mahendra Adarsha Higher Secondary School, Imadol
- Xenium ES
- Peace point secondary school
- Machhapuchhre School, Kusunti
- Kantipur International College Of Engineering, Lubhu
- Bloom Nepal School

== Hospital/Public Health Post/Primary Health Post ==
- Kist Medical College & Hospital, Imadol
- Lubhu Public Health Center, Lubhu
- Siddhipur Health post, Siddhipur
- Siddhipur Community Health Care Center, Siddhipur

== Social Organization ==
There are many business or social organizations in Siddhipur

SN	Organization Name	Type	Established	Nickname	Motto	Logo	Reference
1	Unification of The Youth	Youth Social Organization	2073 B.S	UNITY	Youths for social changes.	Logo of UNITY	http://unity.org.np
1	Firfire Youth CLub	Youth Social Organization	2076 B.S	Firfire	Platform for all ages group.		http://firfireyouth.club
2	Mahalaxmi Yuwa Samuha	Social Organization					
3	Changathali Youth Club	Social Organization					
4	Lalitpur Yuwa Samuha	Social Organization					
5	Satya Yuwa Club	Social Organization					
6	Milijuli Tole Sudhar Samiti	Local Organization					
7	Lamatar Youth Club	Social Organization					
8	Newa Dey Daboo	Social Organization	2076 B.S.	NDD	Movement For Newa Culture		
