= Mount Olive, Mercer County, West Virginia =

Mount Olive, West Virginia
- Unincorporated community
- Location within the state of West Virginia Mount Olive, West Virginia (the United States)
- Coordinates: 37°24′43″N 81°11′40″W
- Country: United States
- State: West Virginia
- County: Mercer
- Elevation: 2,684 ft (818 m)
- Time zone: UTC-5 (Eastern (EST))
  - Summer (DST): UTC-4 (EDT)
- Area codes: 304 & 681
- GNIS feature ID: 1555173

Mount Olive is an unincorporated community in Mercer County, West Virginia, United States. Mount Olive is 2.5 miles (4.0 km) east of Matoaka.
