= Mount Olive, Roane County, West Virginia =

Mount Olive, West Virginia
- Unincorporated community
- Location within West Virginia Location within the United States
- Coordinates: 38°49′18″N 81°25′38″W
- Country: United States
- State: West Virginia
- County: Roane
- Elevation: 745 ft (227 m)
- Time zone: UTC-5 (Eastern (EST))
  - Summer (DST): UTC-4 (EDT)
- Area codes: 304 & 681
- GNIS feature ID: 1740953

Mount Olive is an unincorporated community in Roane County, West Virginia, United States. Mount Olive is 4.5 miles (7.2 km) west-northwest of Spencer.
