= First Baptist Church (Memphis, Tennessee) =

Largwe Baptist church in Memphis, Tennessee

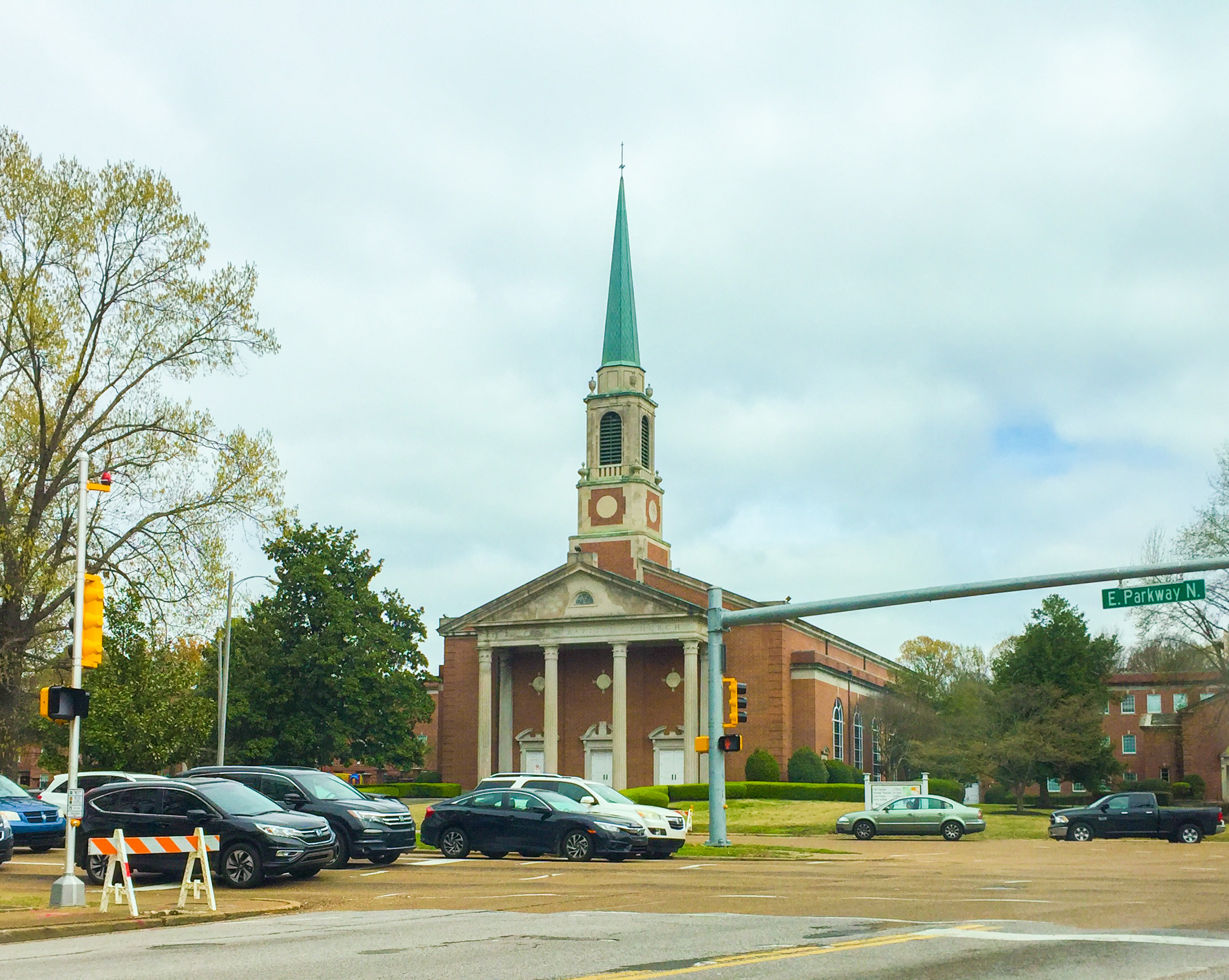
- First Baptist Church, March 2018
- First Baptist Church
- 35.1408°N 89.9822°W
- Location: Memphis, Tennessee
- Country: United States
- Denomination: Cooperative Baptist Fellowship
- Website: www.fbcmemphis.org

History
- Founded: April 1839

Architecture
- Functional status: Functional
- Architectural type: Traditional
- Completed: December 1, 1951, additions completed in 1998

Clergy
- Pastor: Rev. Dr. David Breckenridge

First Baptist Church is a Baptist church located in Memphis, Tennessee. It was established in 1839. The church has been considered influential amongst moderate Baptists throughout the southern United States since its founding.

== History ==
The First Baptist Church of Memphis was organized in April 1839. First Baptist was organized with eleven charter members, meeting in an old log schoolhouse in Downtown Memphis. Its 1907 neo-classical church building designed by R. H. Hunt was completed in 1907. In December 1951, famed Baptist Statesman Rev. Dr. R. Paul Caudill moved the church from the corner of Linden and Lauderdale in the southern portion of Downtown Memphis, to a new location on the edge of Midtown Memphis at 200 East Parkway North. The former building became the home of Mt. Olive Cathedral Christian Methodist Episcopal Church.

=== Music ===
The church has had a rich history of traditional music. Musical instruments include its 1951 Wicks pipe organ, located in its sanctuary, and its 1958 M.P. Möeller pipe organ, located in the Caudill Chapel.

Rev. Ray Hatton was the minister of music since 1986 and Dr. Michelle Dixon-Cronk, D.M.A. had served as the organist since 1990. Music director Earl Holloway preceded Rev. Hatton, and organist Lamar King preceded Dr. Cronk.

== Senior pastors ==
- Rev. Dr. Arthur Upshaw Boone 1898-1930
- Rev. Dr. Robert Johnston Bateman 1931-1943
- Rev. Dr. Robert Paul Caudill 1944-1976
- Rev. Dr. Earl Clinton Davis 1976-1994
- Rev. Dr. Kenneth C. Corr 1996-2007
- Rev. Dr. Frank David Breckenridge 2008-2018
- Rev. Dr. Kathryn Spangler Kimmel 2021-present

== Notable clergy ==
- Rev. Dr. Carol McCall-Richardson
- Rev. Phimphone Phetvixay

== Controversies ==
During the early 1970s, the church voted to allow an African American family to join, being the first Southern Baptist Church in Memphis to do so.

During the 1980s, the church began ordaining women to the diaconate.

During July 1994, Rev. Dr. Earl C. Davis led approximately half of the church membership to plant Trinity Baptist Church, in Cordova.

During 2001, the church ordained a lifelong member of the church, Rev. Dr. Carol McCall-Richardson to the pastorate. She served as the church's associate pastor until her retirement in 2012.
