= Mount Olive High School =

Mount Olive High School may refer to the following American high schools:

- Mount Olive High School (Illinois), Mount Olive, Illinois
- Mount Olive High School (Mississippi), Mount Olive, Mississippi
- Mount Olive High School (New Jersey), Flanders, New Jersey
- Mount Olive High School (North Carolina), Mount Olive, North Carolina

== See also ==
- Mount Olive English Secondary School, a high school in Siddhipur, Nepal
