= Lamatar =

Lamatar लामाटार
- Village of Mahalaxmi Municipality
- Location in Nepal
- Coordinates: 27.62°N 85.40°E
- Country: Nepal
- Province: Province No. 3
- District: Lalitpur

Population (2011)
  - Total: 8,188
- Time zone: UTC+5:45 (Nepal Time)

Lamatar is a village and former Village Development Committee that is now part of Mahalaxmi Municipality in Province No. 3 of central Nepal.

It lies 10 km North-East to the district headquarters of Lalitpur, Patan. To the East of Lamatar lies Ryale VDC of Kavrepalanchwok district. Luvu VDC lies to the West. To the North lie Dadhikot, Sirutar and Gundu VDC of Bhaktapur. Bishankhunarayan VDC lies to the South of Lamatar VDC. It has typical climatic feature as of Kathmandu valley with slightly low temperature. The temperature ranges from 10 to 14 °C during winter and 15 to 30 °C during summer. Snowfall occurs in the hills in winter and good rainfall occurs in summer. Lakuri Bhanjyang is one of the notable place for snowfall during extreme winter. It is also a famous hiking destination for tourists.

The VDC had total population of 8,188 residing in 1759 households according to the census 2068 B.S. Out of which 4072 (49.7%) were male and 4116(50.3%) were female. Most of the people here are Hindu. Followers of other religions like Buddhism, Christianity are also found. 29.66% of people in Lamatar are Chhetri, 27.69% are Brahmin, 15.21% people are Tamang, 10.75% are Newar, 3.68% are Sarki, 2.1% are Magar and 10.93% are others. 72.52% people used Nepali as mother tongue, 15.27% used Tamang, 10.76% used Newar and 1.45% used other languages. This VDC has 73% literacy rate.

Agriculture is the main occupation in the VDC. With exception of some parts of Ward No.6 and 9 and forests area most of the area (380.44 hectares) are suitable for farming. People adopt farming with seasonal crops. Major crops are paddy, wheat, maize and millet. Likewise seasonal crops include vegetables and fruits. People are also involved in other occupations such as service, business and agriculture.

Lamatar VDC is surrounded by forests with wide variety of plants. Using the concept of community forests people have been utilising the forest resources like grass, timber, fodder and pastures. Similarly they have been conserving wide variety of plants like Uttis, Katus, Gurans, Salla and Chilaune.

There is a blacktopped road from Lagankhel to Lamatar. Buses take almost 40 minutes from Lagankhel to Lamatar.

A sub-health post, which is staffed with auxiliary health worker (AHW), village health worker (VHW), is located at ward no.2 of the Village Development Community. Another sub-health post is at ward no.9, Lakurivanjyang staffed with an HA.It is also place where mostly literate people of Nepal live.
