= Mount Olive, Alabama =

Mount Olive may refer to the following places in the U.S. state of Alabama:

- Mount Olive, Barbour County, Alabama, a ghost town
- Mount Olive, Blount County, Alabama, an unincorporated community
- Mount Olive, Butler County, Alabama, an unincorporated community
- Mount Olive, Calhoun County, Alabama, an unincorporated community
- Mount Olive, Coosa County, Alabama, a census-designated place
- Mount Olive, Dekalb County, Alabama, an unincorporated community
- Mount Olive, Jefferson County, Alabama, a census-designated place
- Mount Olive, Lauderdale County, Alabama, an unincorporated community
- Mount Olive (ghost town), Lauderdale County, Alabama, a ghost town
- Mount Olive, Marshall County, Alabama, an unincorporated community
- Mount Olive, Randolph County, Alabama, an unincorporated community
- Mount Olive, Tuscaloosa County, Alabama, an unincorporated community
