= Nagdaha =

Lake in Lalitpur District, Nepal

Nagdaha Lake
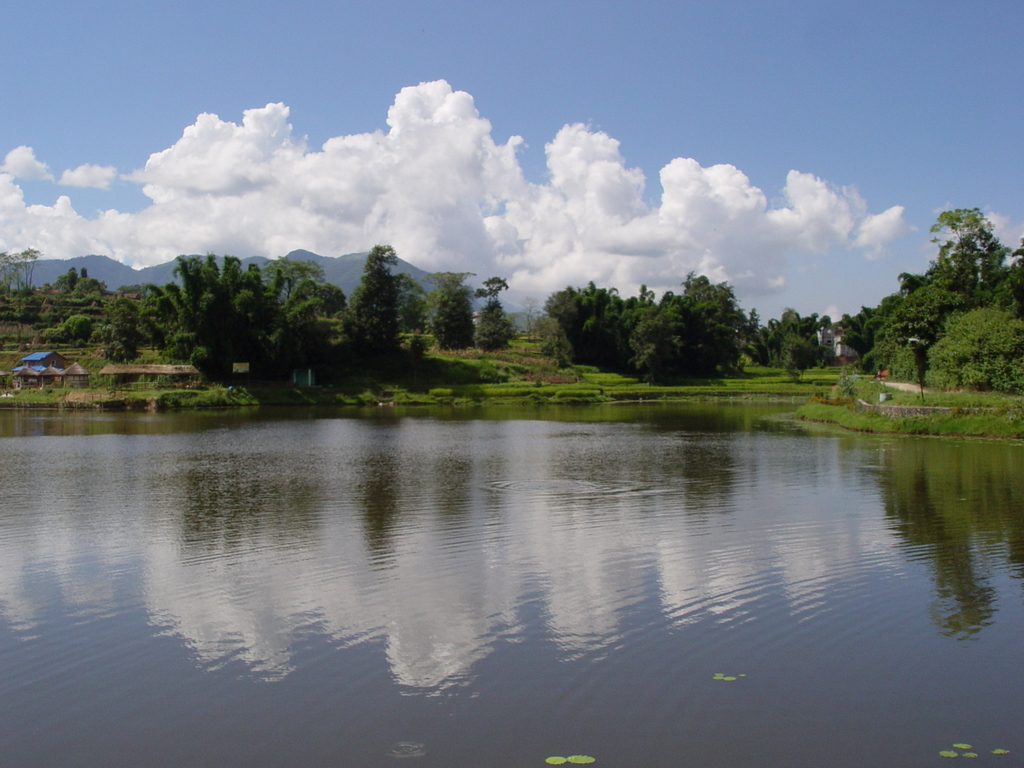
- Nagdaha Lake

- Location in Nepal
- Location: Lalitpur District, Dhapakhel
- Coordinates: 27.6246°N 85.3331°E
- Lake type: Freshwater
- Basin countries: Nepal
- Frozen: Does not freeze
- Settlements: Dhapakhel

Nagdaha is a lake in the Dhapakhel, ward 24 of Lalitpur District, in the Kathmandu Valley, Nepal.

Like many other water bodies and physical features of Kathmandu, the Nagdaha is also steeped in legends. According to one, a male serpent resides in Taudaha and the resident serpent of Nagdaha is female. During the rainy season the male serpent, widely spoken of in ancient scriptures and oral history of Kathmandu as a serpent king, makes a journey to the town of Panauti in order to participate in a festival. It is said that he stays with the female serpent of Nagdaha on his way to and back from Panauti. This union of the nagas, mythical half serpent, half human beings, is followed by heavy rain.

There is a statue of Nag at the north-western side of the lake.

Nagdaha is rich in aquatic wildlife. Many species of native fishes like barbs and snakeheads are abundant. This is also home to several bird species and is a great place for bird-watching. There are more than 50 resident birds, including black kite, black drongo, cattle egret, Oriental magpie robin, common myna, large-billed crow, rose-ringed parakeet, Alexandrine parakeet, common kingfisher, white-breasted kingfisher, red-vented bulbul and owlets. Several migratory species visit the lake in the summer and the winter. Some of the summer visitors are cuckoos, white-breasted waterhen, common moorhen, little grebe and greater painted snipe. Whereas some of the winter visitors are Eurasian coot, ferruginous pochard, northern shoveler, mallard, gadwall and great cormorant. A pair of garganey were spotted by some seniors and young birders on 20 June 2020 and the pair stayed in the lake for about a week. Garganey are rare visitors and that was the first visit after 11 years in Kathmandu valley. Similarly, the lesser whistling duck is also a rare visitor in the valley.

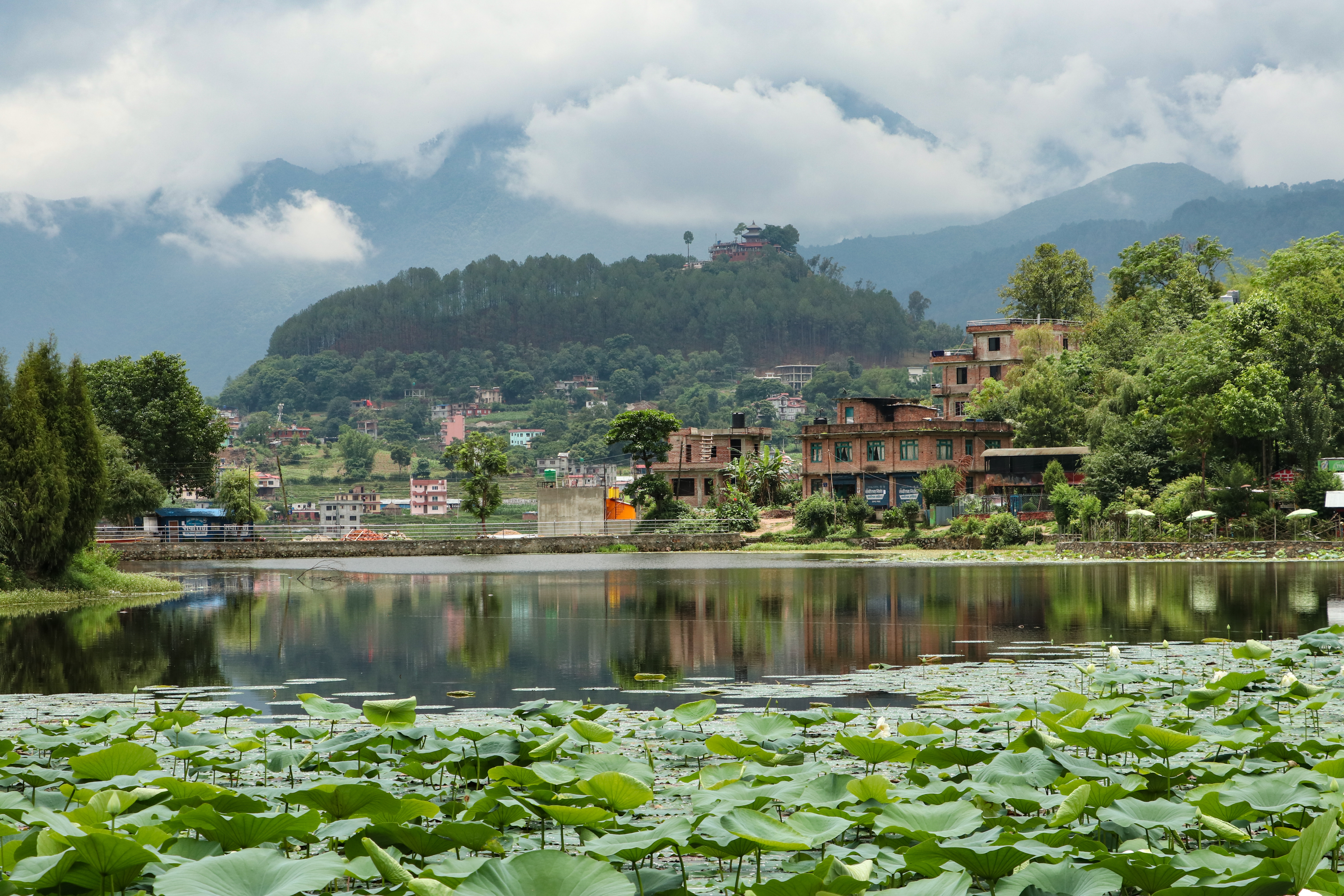
Nagdaha Lake and Sangameswar Mahadev

== Gallery ==
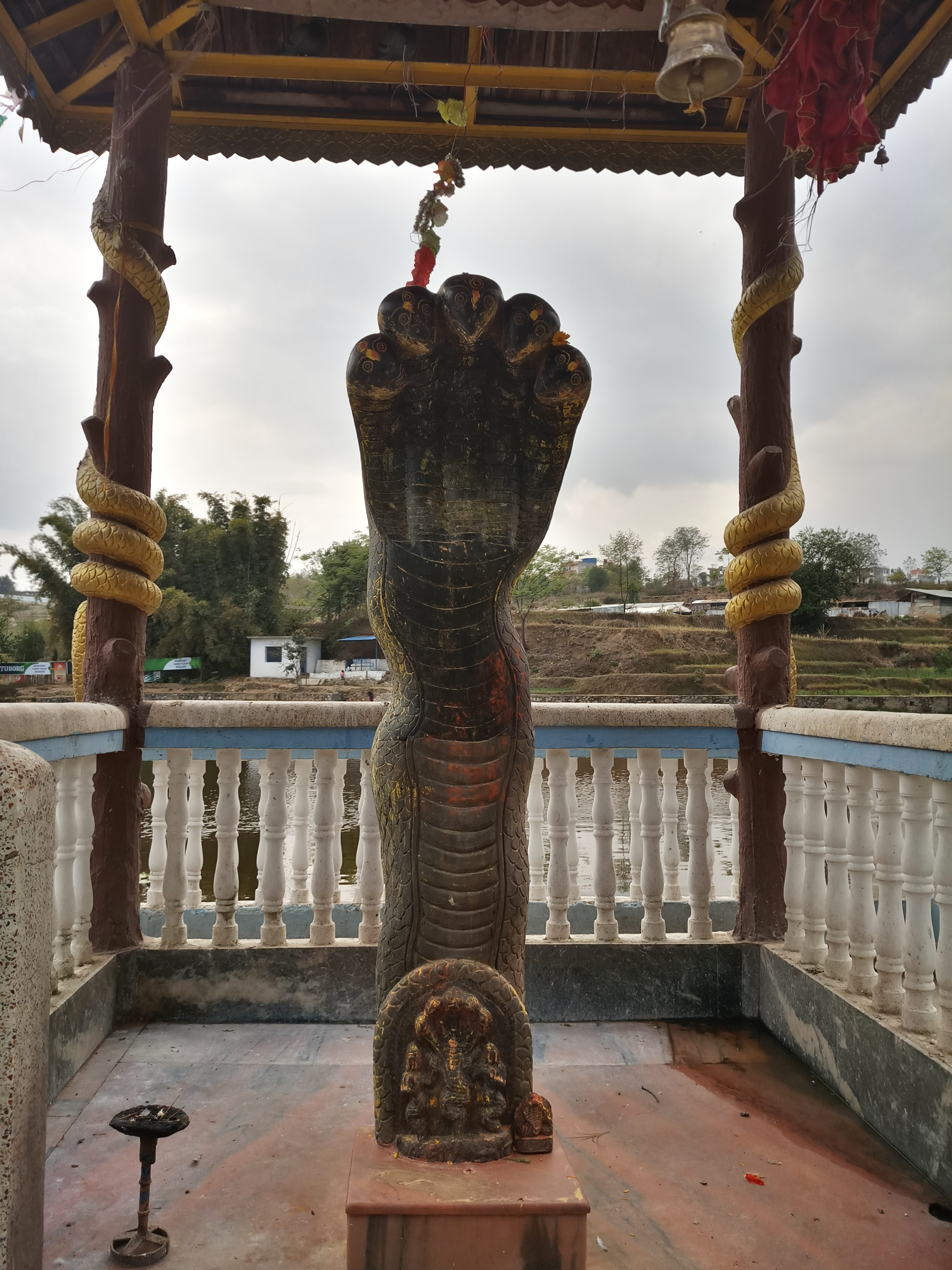
The statue of Nag at the north-western side of the lake.

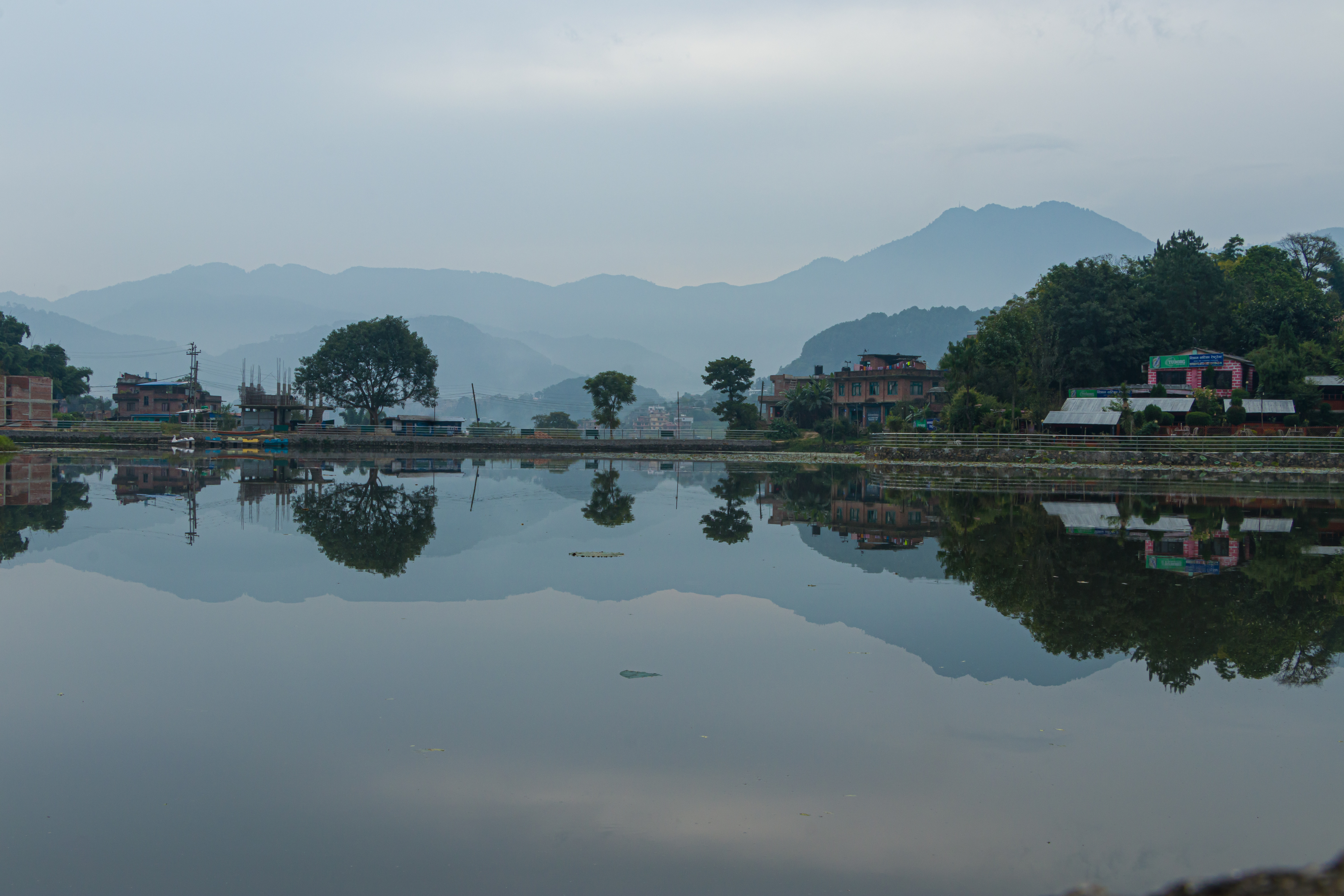
Reflection on a cloudy morning at Nagdaha.

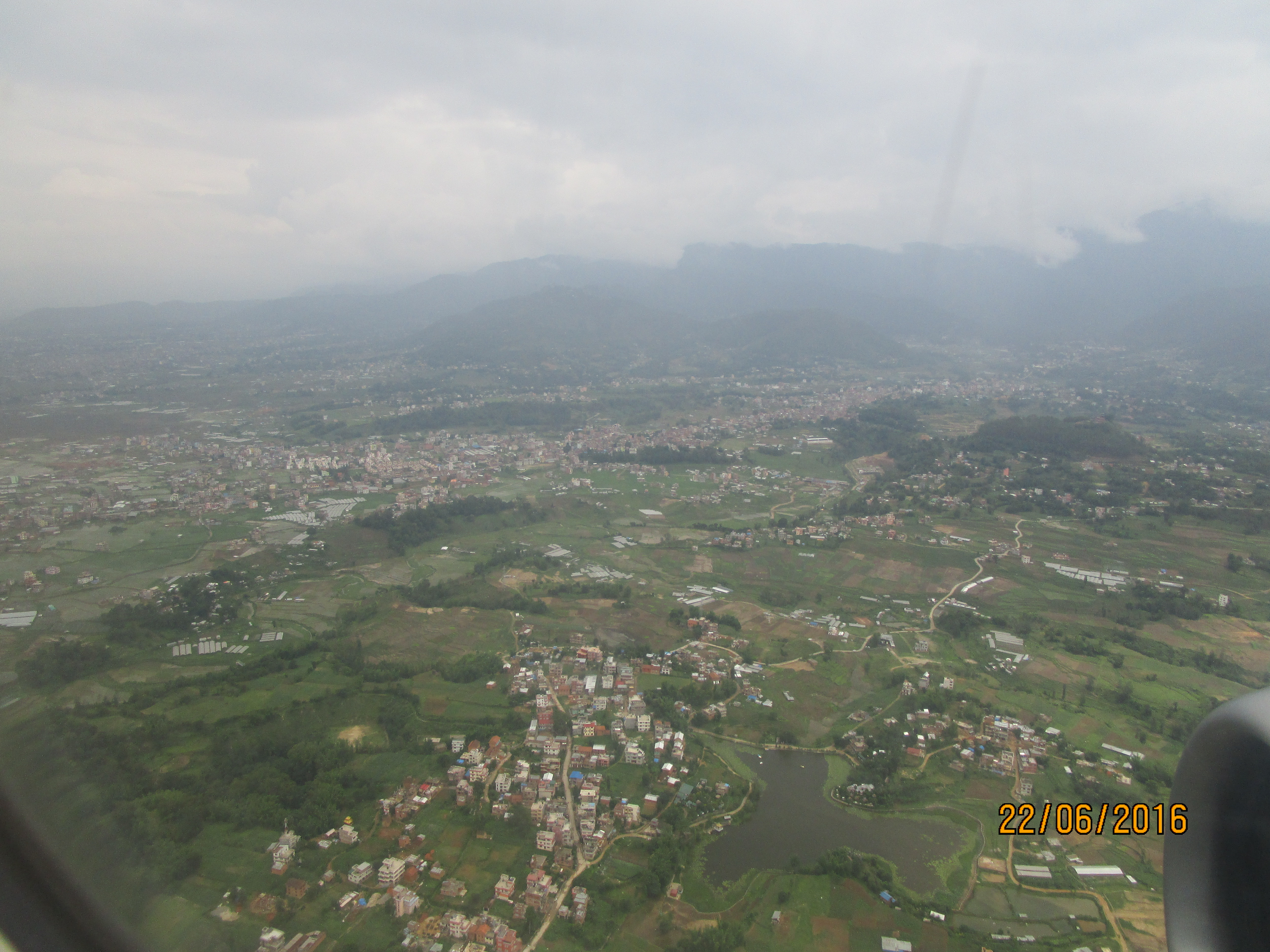
Aerial view of Nagdaha, Dhapakhel, Nepal

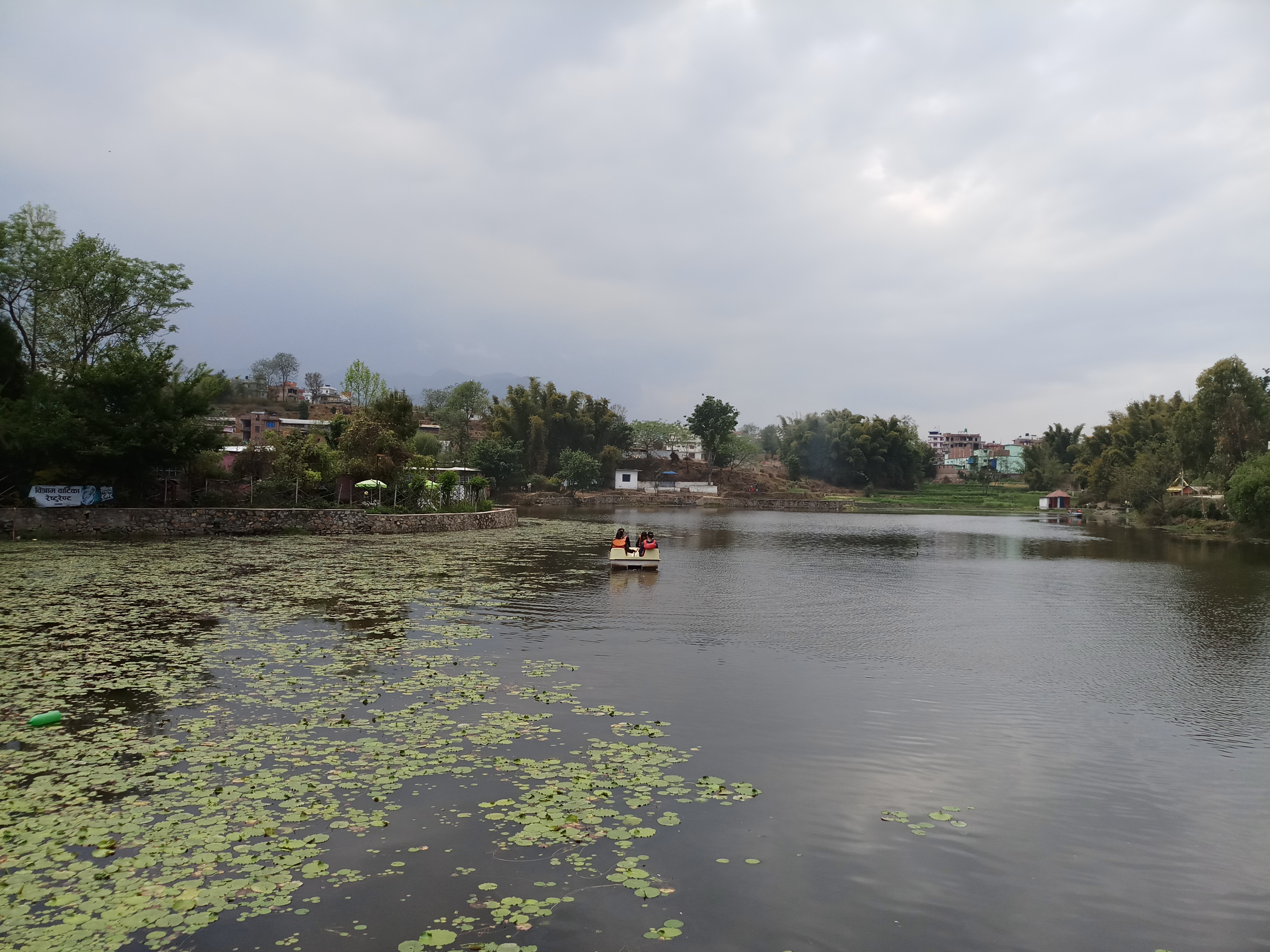

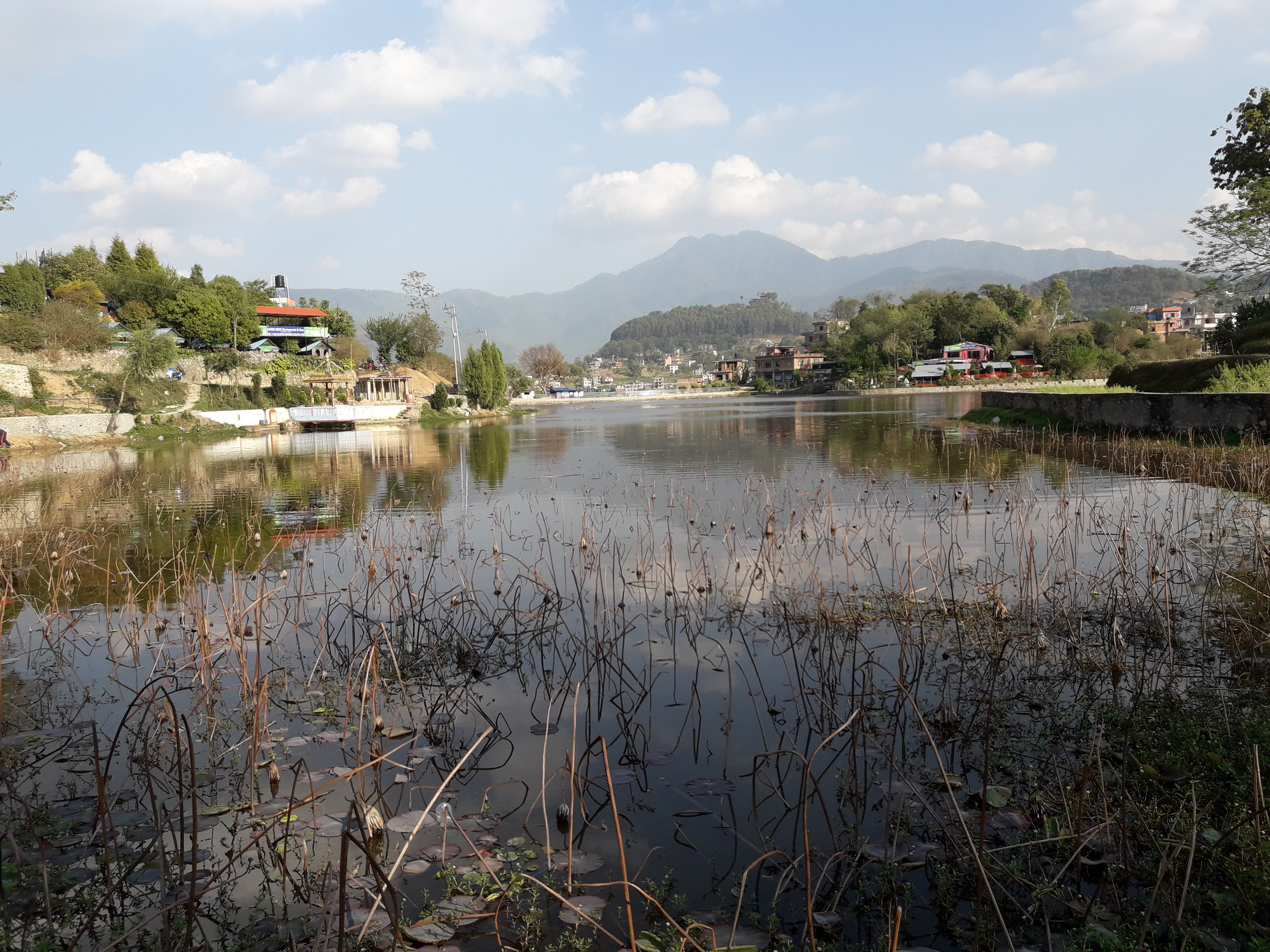
Nagdaha, Lalitpur, Nepal

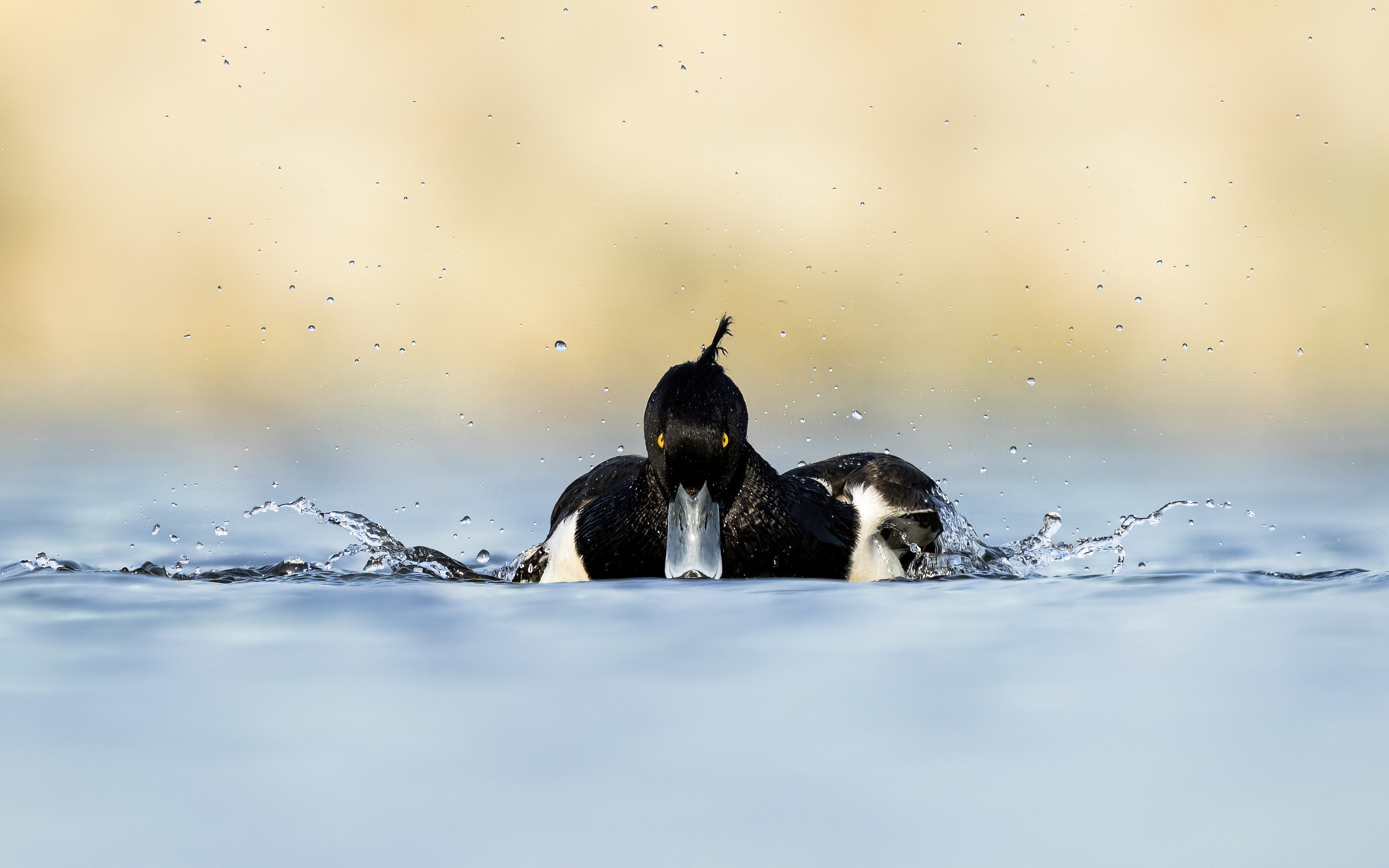
A tufted duck or tufted pochard (Aythya fuligula) in Nagdaha during summer
