= Tikathali =

Tikathali टिकाथली
- Village of Mahalaxmi Municipality
- Location in Nepal
- Coordinates: 27.66°N 85.36°E
- Country: Nepal
- Province: Province No. 3
- District: Lalitpur

Population (1991)
  - Total: 4,094
- Time zone: UTC+5:45 (Nepal Time)

Tikathali is a village and former Village Development Committee that is now part of Mahalaxmi Municipality in Province No. 3 of central Nepal. After the restructuring of local political bodies it has been integrated to form a new municipality named 'Mahalaxmi Municipality'. At the time of the 2021 Nepal census it had a population of 4,094 living in 1,345 individual households.
