= Siddhipur =

Siddhipur सिद्धिपुर Thasi (थसी)
- Village of Mahalaxmi Municipality
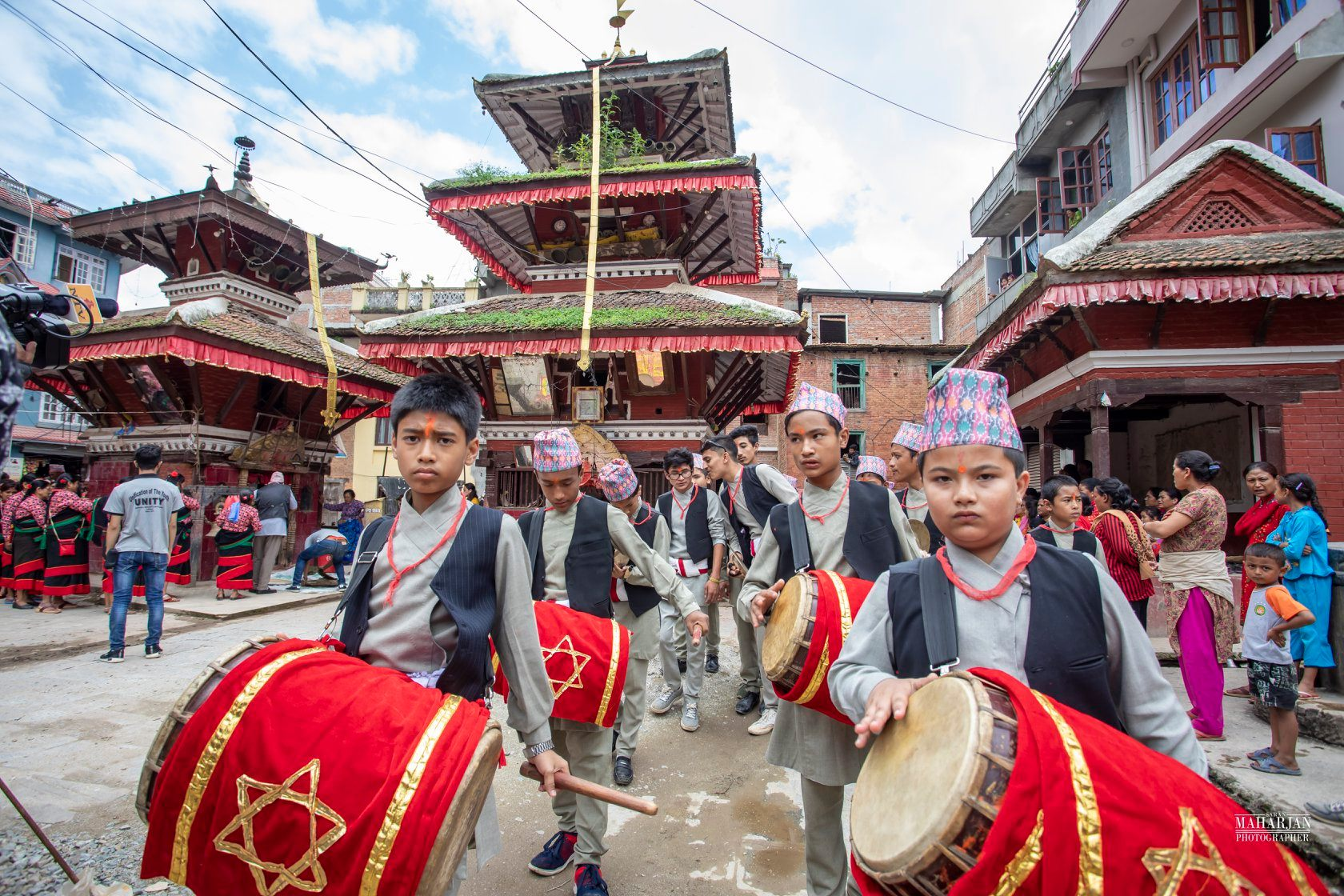
- Temple of Lord Ganesh & Lord Bhairav at Devnani, Siddhipur along with Dhaa: Baja of Siddhipur
- Interactive map of Siddhipur
- Coordinates: 27.6462080°N 85.3572940°E
- Country: Nepal
- Province: Bagmati Province
- District: Lalitpur
- Municipality: Mahalaxmi Municipality
- Ward: Ward No. 6

Government
  - Type: Municipality Ward
  - Ward Chairperson: Dharma Maharjan
  - Socialist & Elected Ward Representative: Susan Maharjan

Population (2021)
  - Total: 8,194
- Time zone: UTC+5:45 (Nepal Time)

Siddhipur is a village and former Village Development Committee that is now part of Mahalaxmi Municipality in Bagmati Province of central Nepal. At the time of the 2021 Nepal census it had a population of 8,194 (Male: 4017; Female: 4177) living in 2009 individual households.

Siddhipur is a typical Newari community (87.49% of total population) where the spoken language is Newari (85.46% spoke Newari). The main occupation of the people living in this region is agriculture. Most of the people fully depend on the agriculture for their living. Siddhipur is also famous for sukul, which is a kind of handmade mat made of hay, a locally available material.

== Location ==
Siddhipur lies about 7.5 kilometres (4.7 mi) from the national capital of Kathmandu and 5.5 kilometres (3.4 mi) from the district headquarters of Lalitpur.

== Education ==
There are many education institutions in Siddhipur .

SN	School name	Type	Level	Established (in BS)	Nickname	Motto	Logo	Reference
1	Shree Siddhimangal Higher Secondary School	Public	Higher Secondary	2012	Shree Siddhimangal H.S.S	N/A	N/A	
2	Nepal Don Bosco School	Private	Higher Secondary	2001	NDBS	For God and For Country	N/A	
3	Mount Olive English Secondary School	Private	Secondary	2044	MOESS	"Education is your life, guard it well"	N/A	
4	Kopila English Secondary School	Private	Secondary	2046	KESS	N/A	N/A	
5	Anant English School	Private	Secondary	2048	AES	"From Dark Unto Light"	N/A	
6	Nava Kunja Secondary School	Private	Secondary	2050	NKS	N/A	N/A	
7	Shree Bhanodaya Primary School	Public	Primary	2019	Bhanodaya	Next are we, future of nation	N/A	
8	Lalit Academy	Private	Secondary	2053	Lalit	N/A	N/A	

== Business/Social Organizations ==
There are many business or social organizations in Siddhipur.

SN	Organization Name	Type	Established	Nickname	Motto	Logo	Reference
1	Unification of The Youth	Social Organization	formed on 2072 B.S and legally registered on 2073 B.S	UNITY	Youths for social changes.	Logo of UNITY	http://unity.org.np
