= Mount Olive Cathedral =

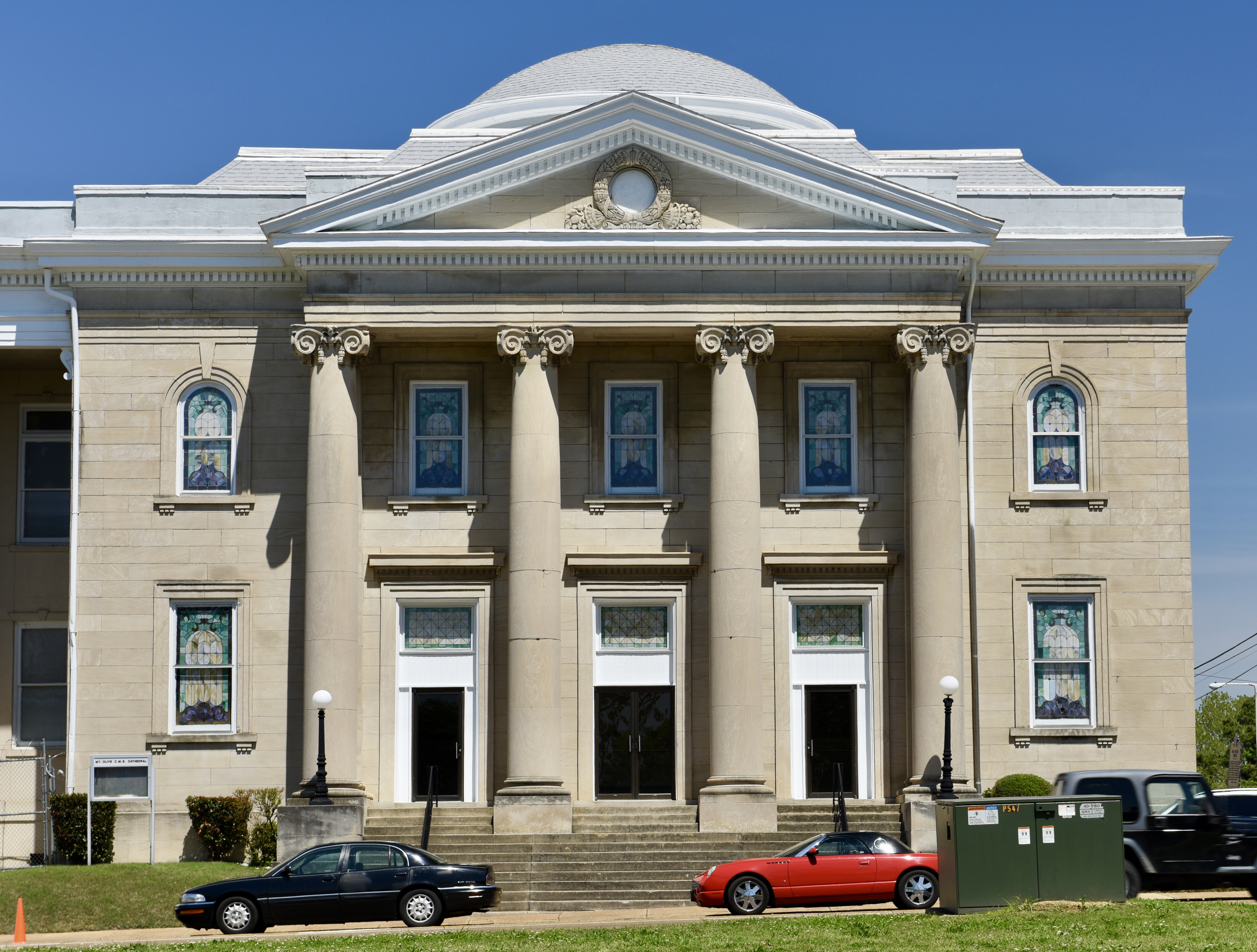
- Mount Olive Cathedral photographed in 2017.

Religion
- Affiliation: Christian Methodist Episcopal Church
- Status: Active

Location
- Location: Memphis, Tennessee, United States of America
- State: Tennessee
- Interactive map of Mount Olive Cathedral

Architecture
- Architect: R. H. Hunt
- Type: Cathedral
- Style: Beaux-Arts Classicism
- Completed: 1907
- First Baptist Church
- U.S. National Register of Historic Places
- Location within Tennessee
- Coordinates: 35°08′19″N 90°02′38″W
- MPS: Religious Resources of Memphis, Shelby County, TN MPS
- NRHP reference No.: 05000182
- Added to NRHP: March 15, 2005

Mount Olive Cathedral is a Christian Methodist Episcopal church in Memphis, Tennessee, United States of America. It is located on the corners of Linden Avenue and Lauderdale Street. The Reverend Dr. Stevey M. Wilburn is the current minister of the cathedral.

== History ==
Mt. Olive Cathedral originally started as a church in the Jug Factory on the corner of South Orleans and Georgia Avenue in Memphis, Tennessee. As the congregation grew, the church moved into a building they had rented, and from there a brick church was built on Georgia Avenue. In 1952, the church moved to its current place and became a cathedral. This building was designed by R. H. Hunt for First Baptist Church in 1907. When the white Baptist congregation sold the building to the African American CME one, the cooperation of the segregated churches was reported in an article in the New York Times.

== See also ==
- First Baptist Church (Memphis, Tennessee)
