= Dhapakhel =

Dhapakhel धापाखेल Nagdaha
- metropolitan city
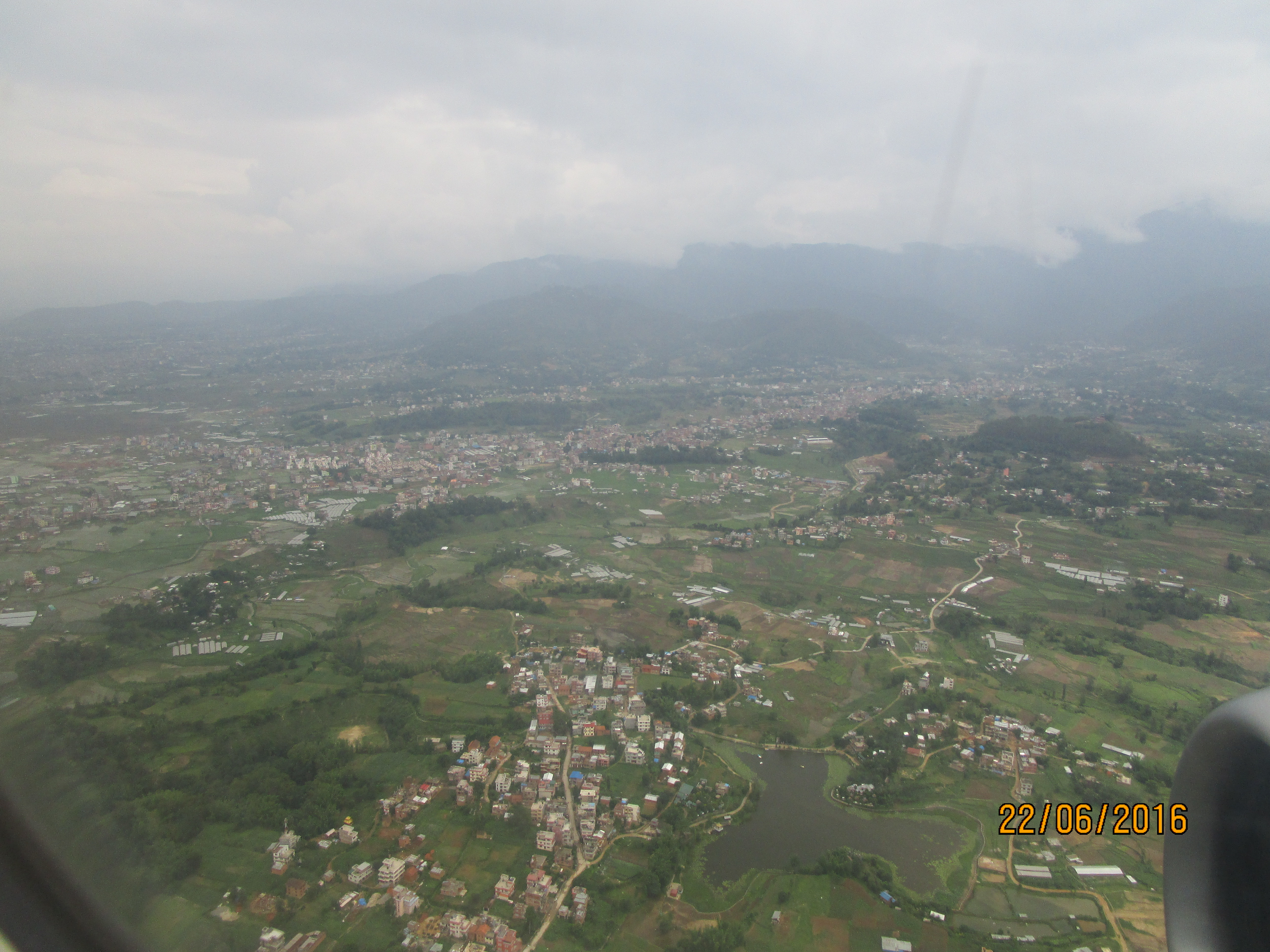
- Aerial view of Dhapakhel, Nepal

- Location in Nepal
- Coordinates: 27.63°N 85.33°E
- Country: Nepal
- Zone: Bagmati Zone
- District: Lalitpur District

Population (1991)
  - Total: 4,591
- Time zone: UTC+5:45 (Nepal Time)
  - Summer (DST): +05:45

Dhapakhel is a town in Lalitpur District in the Bagmati Zone of central Nepal. At the time of the 1991 Nepal census it had a population of 4,591 in 857 individual households. At the eastern part of Dhapakhel the Kantipur Engineering College is located.

Nagdaha, GEMS school, Civil Homes Phase IV, ICIMOD, Sumeru Hospital are situated in Dhapakhel.
