= Mount Olive Cemetery =

Mount Olive Cemetery or Mt. Olive Cemetery may refer to:

- Mount Olive Cemetery (Chicago)
- Mount Olive Cemetery (Jackson, Mississippi), NRHP-listed in Hinds County
- Mount Olive Cemetery (Wilmington, Delaware)
- Mt. Olive Cemetery (Clarksville, Tennessee), NRHP-listed in Montgomery County

== See also ==
- Mount Olivet Cemetery (disambiguation)
