= Mount Olivet Cemetery =

Mount Olivet Cemetery may refer to:

== Canada ==
- Mount Olivet Cemetery (Halifax), Nova Scotia

== United States ==
- Olivet Gardens of Cypress Lawn Memorial Park, Colma, California, formerly Mount Olivet Cemetery
- Mount Olivet Cemetery (Wheat Ridge, Colorado)
- Mount Olivet Cemetery (Chicago), Illinois
- Mount Olivet Cemetery (Dubuque, Iowa)
- Mt. Olivet Episcopal Church and Cemetery, Pineville, Louisiana, listed on the National Register of Historic Places (NRHP)
- Mount Olivet Cemetery (Baltimore), Maryland
- Mount Olivet Cemetery (Frederick, Maryland)
- Mount Olivet Cemetery (Detroit), Michigan
- Mount Olivet Cemetery (Middletown, New Jersey)
- Mount Olivet Cemetery (Newark)
- Mount Olivet Cemetery (Queens), New York
- Mount Olivet Cemetery (Tonawanda), New York
- Mount Olivet Cemetery (Hanover, Pennsylvania)
- Mt. Olivet Cemetery (Jackson, Tennessee), NRHP-listed in Madison County
- Mount Olivet Cemetery (Nashville), Tennessee, NRHP-listed
- Mount Olivet Cemetery (Fort Worth, Texas)
- Mount Olivet Cemetery (Salt Lake City), Utah
- Mount Olivet Cemetery (Washington, D.C.)
- Mount Olivet Cemetery (Janesville, Wisconsin)
- Mount Olivet Cemetery (Milwaukee), Wisconsin

== See also ==
- Mount Olive Cemetery (disambiguation)
