= Lubhu, Lalitpur =

Lubhu लुभू Suvarna Chhatrapur (सुवर्ण छत्रपुर)
- Village of Mahalaxmi Municipality
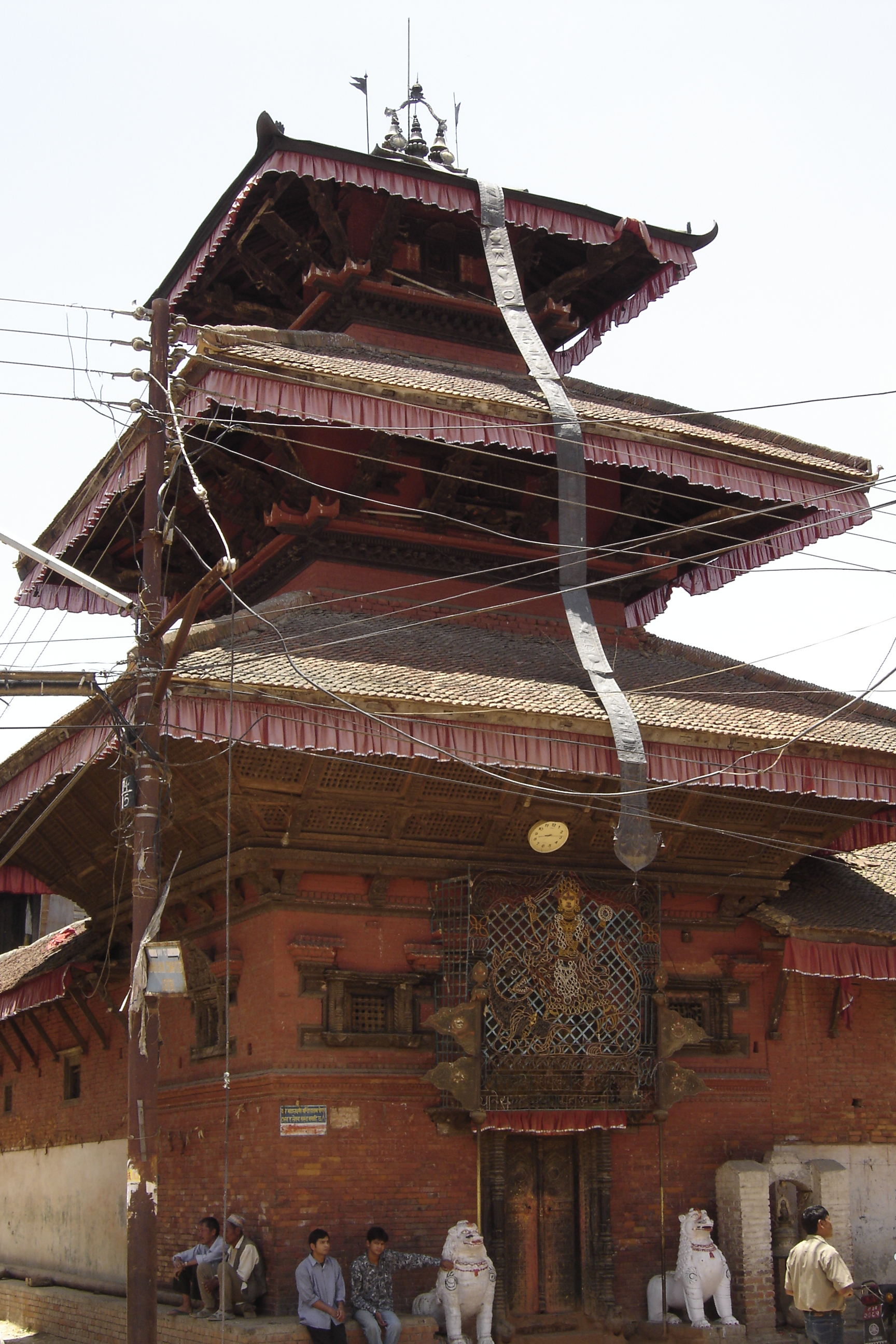
- The Mahalakshmi–Mahabhairav Temple in Lubhu

- Location in Nepal
- Coordinates: 27°38′N 85°23′E
- Country: Nepal
- Province: Bagmati Province
- District: Lalitpur
- Municipality: Mahalaxmi
- Ward/s: 7 and 8

Population (2011)
  - Total: 10,374
- Time zone: UTC+5:45 (Nepal Time)
- Postal code: 44708
- Area code: 01
- Website: http://www.lubhoo.com.np/

Lubhu (Nepal Bhasa: लुभू) is a place that is part of Mahalaxmi Municipality in Bagmati Province of central Nepal. Lubhu is a sub-urban Newar location situated seven kilometers east of Kathmandu in northern part of Lalitpur, Nepal.

== Etymology ==
There are interesting folklores explaining how Lubhu, which in Newari means “Golden Plate” got its name.

In ancient time, Lubhu was hit by disease. Ganga Maharani, the ruler of the city, sold her golden plate and resettles the city. So, the city was called Lubhu which means Golden Plate.

God Bhairav laid under golden umbrella to save the people from disease. The place was then called ‘Subarna Chhatrapur’ but was called ‘Lubhu’, which means the same in Newari.

== Demographics ==
The settlement in the 730 acres of land of Lubhu is mostly populated by an ethnic Newari community of mainly Shresthas, Maharjans, Rajthala and Gubhaju in the main town area and Brahmin and chhetri in the outskirts.

== Festival ==
Mahalaxmi jatra is the main festival of Lubhu. It celebrates in the month of Baishakha especially from Baishakha Sukla Tritiya till to Ekadasi which takes more than a week for its completion. During the festival, the idols of Goddess Mahalaxmi and Lord Mahabhairav are placed in elaborately decorated wooden palanquins (khat) and carried through the streets of Lubhoo. The procession is accompanied by traditional Newar music, dances, and rituals performed by local cultural groups such as the Lubhoo Dafa Manka Khala and Chatrapal Mahabhairav Manka Khala. The event draws large crowds and active participation from the local community.

== Economy ==
Lubhu is a major textile-production area producing locally made garments. Lubhu is a major source of garments of many Nepalese cloth industries and tourist areas like Thamel. A majority of households have their own small to large scale factories to produce such garments. While some still have the traditional wooden hand looms, many residents own textile factories with electric looms.

Agriculture is also a major occupation.
