= Mount Olive English Secondary School =

Location
- Siddhipur, Mahalaxmi Municipality Lalitpur, Bagmati Zone; Nepal
- Coordinates: 27.6462080°N 85.3572940°E

Information
- Type: Private
- Established: 2044 BS
- Principal: Bishal Yamphu
- Grades: Nursery to 10
- Enrollment: 400 approximately
- Nickname: MOESS
- Affiliation: S.L.C Board (Secondary), PABSON
- Website: www.moess.edu.np

Mount Olive English School is a high school in Siddhipur, Nepal.

== Houses ==
The school has four houses: Red, Blue, Yellow and Green.

== See also ==
- List of schools in Nepal
