= Oak Forest Hospital of Cook County =

Geography
- Location: Oak Forest, Illinois, United States
- Coordinates: 41°35′55″N 87°43′53″W

Services
- Beds: 600+

History
- Opened: 1854
- Closed: 2011

Links
- Lists: Hospitals in Illinois

Oak Forest Hospital of Cook County is a defunct 600+ bed hospital located in south suburban Oak Forest, Illinois. It specialized in long-term care, ventilator care, chronic disease and rehabilitation services. It was part of the Cook County Bureau of Health Services, which also includes the more prominent and newer John H. Stroger, Jr. Hospital of Cook County.

At one point, uninsured patients from other hospitals in Cook County requiring sub-acute, chronic, long term, ventilator care, or rehabilitation were sent to Oak Forest Hospital as an alternative to remaining in acute hospitals such as John H. Stroger, Jr. Hospital of Cook County or Provident Hospital - Chicago or going to nursing homes.

Many services and facilities at Oak Forest Hospital were cut or closed down, including long-term care units, some rehabilitation services, and conveniences such as the hospital's cafeteria. As a result, patients who lived in the long-term care units were placed to lower-quality nursing facilities.

The hospital was converted to a clinic named Oak Forest Health Center of Cook County, which later closed. The buildings on the 153-acre campus are in the process of being demolished. The demolition began in late 2023, and the demolition project is scheduled to be completed in 2027.

== Historical role of state and county government in providing care to the indigent in Illinois ==
=== First facility in Cook County ===
The Chicago State Hospital was the only large-scale facility available in Cook County, Illinois to address a variety of longer-term health-related needs of the poor when its doors opened in 1854. Early on the facility, located in Dunning, became known in conversation as the Dunning Insane Asylum or simply "Dunning", most likely referenced this way due to the name of the train station near the facility.

Although the facility began as a poor farm or almshouse, eventually it began to accept people considered to be mentally ill in some fashion, as well as other biological-based diseases.

=== History of abuse, neglect, and corruption under county supervision at Dunning ===
By 1874, the Chicago Tribune published a story about abuse, neglect and government corruption with the facility. In an 1886 state investigation, one of the sedatives used at Dunning was a mixture containing chloral hydrate as well as cannabis, hops and potash. The investigation also found that Dunning was apparently serving two kegs of beer daily to both patients and employees. A lack of fruit and fresh vegetables had caused an epidemic of scurvy;About 200 patients had the illness, according to the same investigation. "The cooking, we are convinced, was bad," the investigators said.

By the early 1900s, the reputation of the Dunning facility was riddled with horror stories and legal battles appearing in the newspapers and amongst the general public.

With the arc of awareness of such matters growing outward as a result of the telegraph industry being forced to fight for its relevance against the telephone companies, Cook County eventually determined it was time to build another facility to handle the growing number of indigents unable to afford private health care.

=== State takeover of Dunning facility in exchange for Oak Forest Infirmary ===
In 1911, an agreement was reached between the State of Illinois and Cook County in which the County surrendered all assets and liabilities associated with the Dunning facility and at the same time, the county was leaving all residents deemed to be insane at the Dunning facility while transferring the remaining residents to what was to become the Oak Forest Hospital facility by July 1, 1911, which would remain under the supervision of Cook County officials and employees.

This agreement was in some ways more of a formality since Cook County had already called for bids and the facility was fairly complete, both in construction and in an operational manner in 1910.

== The initial development years ==
=== Cook County initiates development of Oak Forest Infirmary in 1907 ===
While the State conducted activities intending to provide better patient living conditions over the next few years at the Dunning facility, the County acted against the State. Many people in both large and small communities had a low tolerance level for a number of ailments, with issues such as poverty being viewed as "proof" someone must be "sick" in order to live such a way. Definitions of compassion ranged from providing for fresh air in the architecture design while others were busy practicing some form of eugenics to speed the process of biological death.

Five bids were submitted for consideration, opened by Superintendent of Public Service for Cook County William McLaren at a Board of Commissioners meeting on December 9, 1907; two from Edward A. Wanner, one from the law firm of Fischer & Fischer on behalf of Bernhard H. Franzen, George L. Thatcher of Thatcher, Griffin and Wright, and C. L. Buss. According to the meeting minutes, the bid submitted by C. L. Buss was the first one accepted by the county on December 3, 1907, and holds clues as to what the advertisement might have requested as well as reflecting the most complex pricing strategy for the tract of land as a package deal. Rather than averaging the cost of the entire tract to fit the demands of the county, certain acres were more expensive than other acres. Wanner's submission of a bid referencing property in the Orland township area clearly exceeded the 300 acre maximum and therefore outside of the scope of proposed work.

=== The DuPont Farm and Ammunition facility 1906 explosion ===
Although the property submitted by C. L. Buss was less than a quarter-mile away from Chicago, Rock Island and Pacific Railroad, the DuPont Farm and Ammunition Storage facility most likely played a role in the choice of the county to purchase the property offered for sale.

Opening in 1894, the location had its own track spur off of the Chicago, Rock Island Railroad in between the Midlothian and Oak Forest whistle stops as well as a listing in the train schedule.(4) The primary product manufactured at the location was smokeless gunpowder, which was a clear game-changer in the gunpowder industry as well as forever altering the face of warfare. The DuPont station served as both a passenger drop off and pick up location for staff along with the occasion guest while providing a means to begin their distribution process of their product they were manufacturing.

Explosions were not uncommon in gunpowder factories and storage facilities and 12 years later in 1906, an explosion leveled the DuPont facility. Although there is currently no clear evidence as to the precise location of the facility, apparently the shock-waves from the explosion traveled a decent enough distance in which the windows of the Midlothian Country Club were shattered, according to a newspaper report. The newspaper adopted the name of the geographical location to be "DuPont, Illinois."

The material fallout from such an explosion must have affected the surrounding farms and small town community to varying degrees, and at some point prior to the call for bids by Cook County for the grounds, there was a transfer of the property to a "C. L. Busse" or "C. L. Buss" (depending on what records you are referencing) prior to the bid submission.

== Alternate identities ==
The Oak Forest Infirmary was eventually referenced in 1911 County meeting minutes as the Cook County Poor Farm or the Poor Farm at Oak Forest, Illinois.

Other known identities are The Cook County Almshouse, Cook County Poorhouse, Cook County Infirmary, Cook County Old-Age Home, and Oak Forest Tuberculosis Hospital.

Despite its adoption of "Oak Forest" in its name over the decades, the property has always resided outside of the city's jurisdiction and never was annexed to the City of Oak Forest, Illinois.
