= Dunning, Chicago =

Community area in Chicago, Illinois

Dunning
- Community area
- Community Area 17 – Dunning
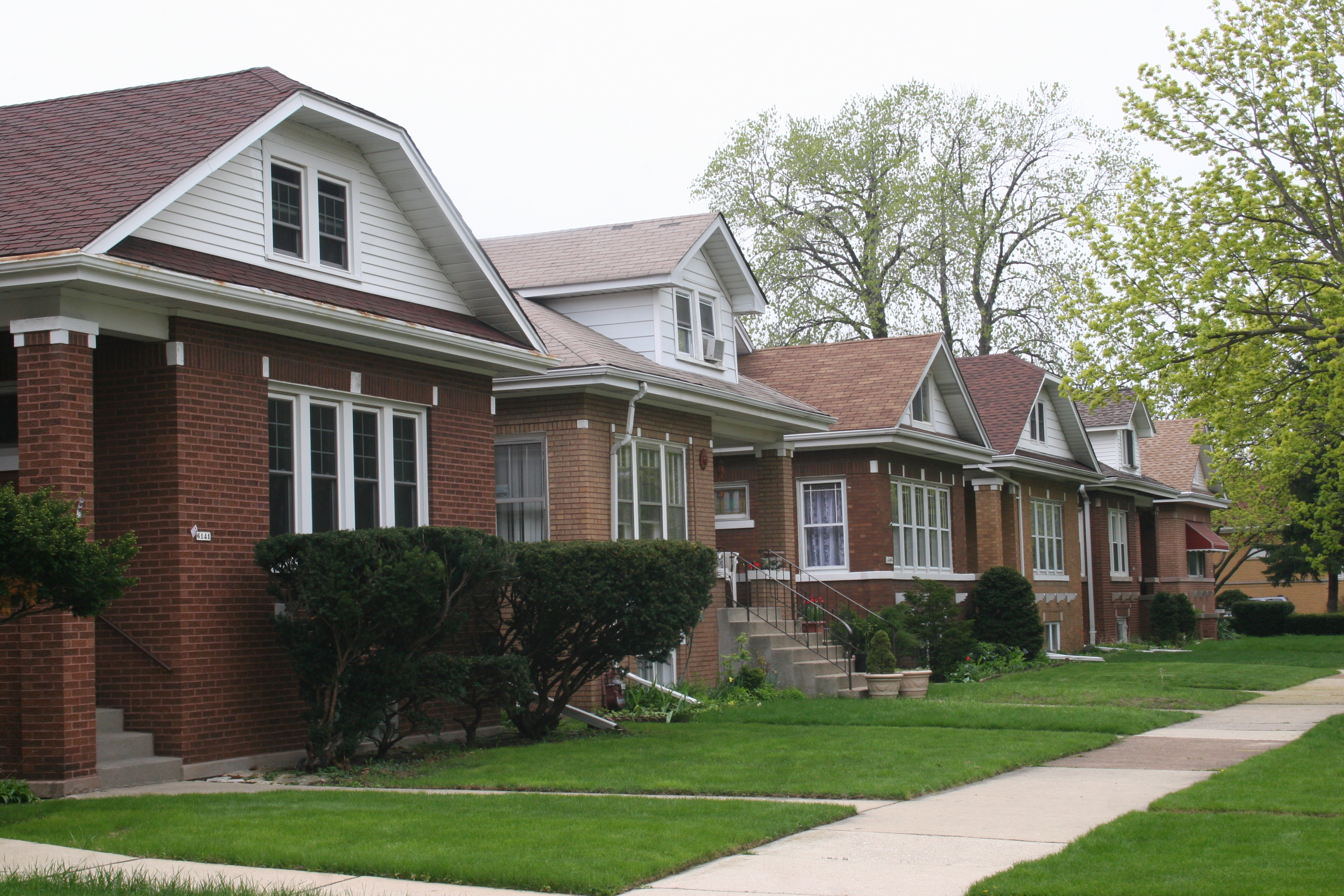
- Schorsch Irving Park Gardens Historic District

- Location within the city of Chicago
- Coordinates: 41°57′N 87°49′W
- Country: United States
- State: Illinois
- County: Cook
- City: Chicago
- Named for: David S. Dunning
- Neighborhoods: List: Belmont Heights; Belmont Terrace; Dunning; Irving Woods; Schorsch Village

Area
  - Total: 3.75 sq mi (9.71 km^{2})

Population (2024)
  - Total: 41,233
  - Density: 11,000/sq mi (4,250/km^{2})

Demographics 2024
  - White: 51.8%
  - Black: 2.5%
  - Hispanic: 36.7%
  - Asian: 6.1%
  - Other: 2.8%
- Time zone: UTC-6 (CST)
  - Summer (DST): UTC-5 (CDT)
- ZIP Codes: parts of 60634, 60635, 60707
- Median household income: $84,684
- Source: U.S. Census, Record Information Services

Dunning is one of the 77 community areas of Chicago, Illinois, United States.

In 1851, the small, rural settlement that would later become Dunning, was chosen by the Cook County Board of Commissioners to be the site of Chicago's new Poorhouse and Insane Asylum. Often referred to as the County Poor Farm, the institution later expanded to include a separate insane asylum, potters field, tuberculosis hospital, schoolhouse and many support buildings. In 1865, the Dunning family bought 120 acres of land south of the Poor Farm. By 1882, the County Commissioners had built a train depot on the hospital grounds and arranged for a daily train to deliver supplies directly to the Poor Farm. The depot was named "Dunning" in honor of the nearby property owners. The settlement surrounding the depot also began to be referred to as Dunning. In the early 20th century, Dunning attracted many new immigrants, including people of Swedish, German, and Polish descent.

== Description ==
Dunning is a community in the northwest of Chicago. It borders the villages of Harwood Heights, Norridge, River Grove, as well as Elmwood Park. It is also the location of Wilbur Wright College, Mount Olive Cemetery, the Chicago-Read Mental Health Center, and Dunning Memorial Park.

== History ==
After the 1833 Treaty of Chicago between the United States government and the Chippewa, Odawa, and Potawatomi tribes, the land northwest of Chicago became available for settlement. Early settlers to the area included Peter Ludby and David S. Dunning. In 1850, Jefferson Township was established. Its borders comprised Devon Avenue to the north, Harlem Avenue on the west, Western Avenue to the east, and to the south, North Avenue. It was a convenient stop for travelers to and from Chicago. The North West Plank Road (now Irving Park Road), built in 1849, was beneficial to local farmers as a reliable method of transport of goods between Chicago and their settlements. The proximity of Jefferson to this major road and distance from downtown Chicago, was a primary consideration in the area being selected in 1851 by the Cook County Board of Commissioners as the site for Chicago's new Poorhouse and Insane Asylum.

=== Cook County Poorhouse and Insane Asylum ===
In 1851, the Cook County Board of Commissioners purchased 160 acres from Peter Ludby, as the site for a new Poorhouse and Insane Asylum for the city of Chicago. Initially, both facilities, together known as the Cook County Poor Farm, were housed in a new three-story brick building. After 1855, the complex expanded to support tuberculosis patients. In 1870, the county built a separate building for the insane asylum. In the 1880s, additional buildings were added to support more than 1000 patients, including a schoolhouse for the Poorhouse children. By 1882, overcrowding challenged the county's ability to fund and manage the growing population at the Poor Farm. A new Poorhouse building, called the "Infirmary" was built on the property, close to Irving Park Road. In 1899, a tuberculosis hospital was built, near the intersection of Irving Park Road and Narragansett. In 1912, the county officially transferred the Poor Farm property to the State of Illinois. The destitute inmates were moved to Oak Forest Hospital infirmary in Oak Forest, Illinois. The patients at the insane asylum remained at the Dunning facility, which was renamed the Chicago State Hospital. When the State Hospital closed in 1970, it merged its operation and staff with the Chicago-Read Mental Health Center.

=== Cemeteries ===
The burial ground at the Poor farm provided for the destitute and the mentally ill inmates, and later became a potters field for the destitute and unclaimed bodies of Cook County. The Scandinavian Lutheran Cemetery Association bought 65 acres south of Dunning's property in 1886 and established the Mount Olive Cemetery. Jewish families purchased 40 acres between the Scandinavian cemetery and Addison for burials. In 1989, during development near Irving Park Road and Narragansett Ave., human remains were discovered. Research led to the re-discovery of the Cook County Potter's Field, which had been located near the poor house and insane asylum. Approximately 38,000 people were buried there between the 1850s and the 1920s. A small park called the Read Dunning Memorial Park was established in 2002 as a memorial for those buried in the area.

=== Residential development ===
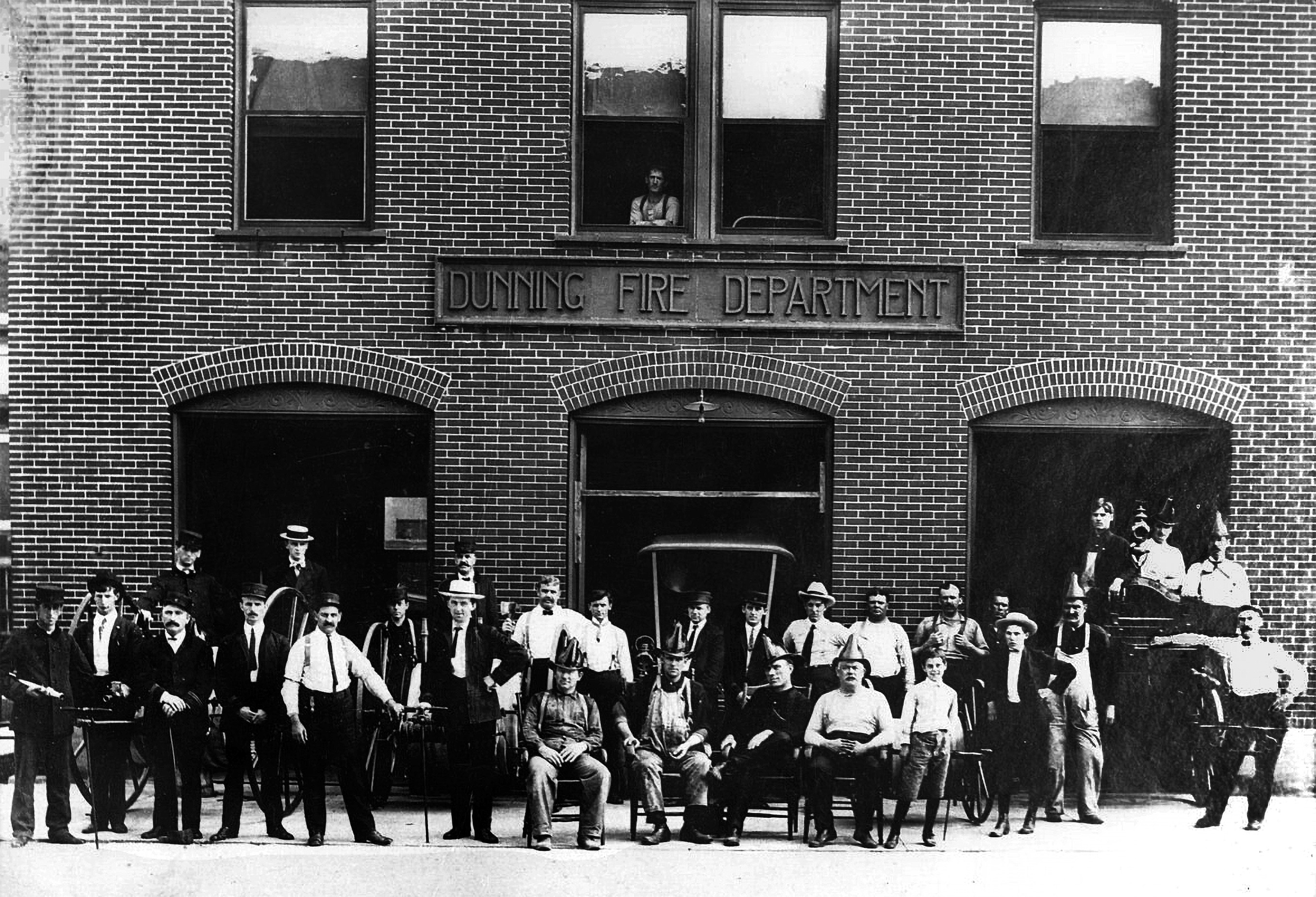
Dunning Fire Dept., c. 1890

In 1865, David Dunning and his son Andrew bought 120 acres of land south of the Cook County Poorhouse and Asylum. In the 1880s and 1890s Dunning's rolling landscape remained sparsely settled. The nearest railroad station was two miles away in the town of Jefferson. Unable to easily transport patients, visitors, and supplies to the expanding Poor Farm complex, the Cook County Commissioners built a three mile track and arranged for a daily train run by the Milwaukee and St. Paul Railway. The track ran between Mount Olive Cemetery and Zion Gardens Cemetery, directly to the county complex. The new track also provided for farmers shipments to Chicago and a special funeral train for the two cemeteries. A hospital depot was built by the county and was named "Dunning" in honor of the nearby property owners. In 1896 a street car line was added. It ran west on Irving Park Road.

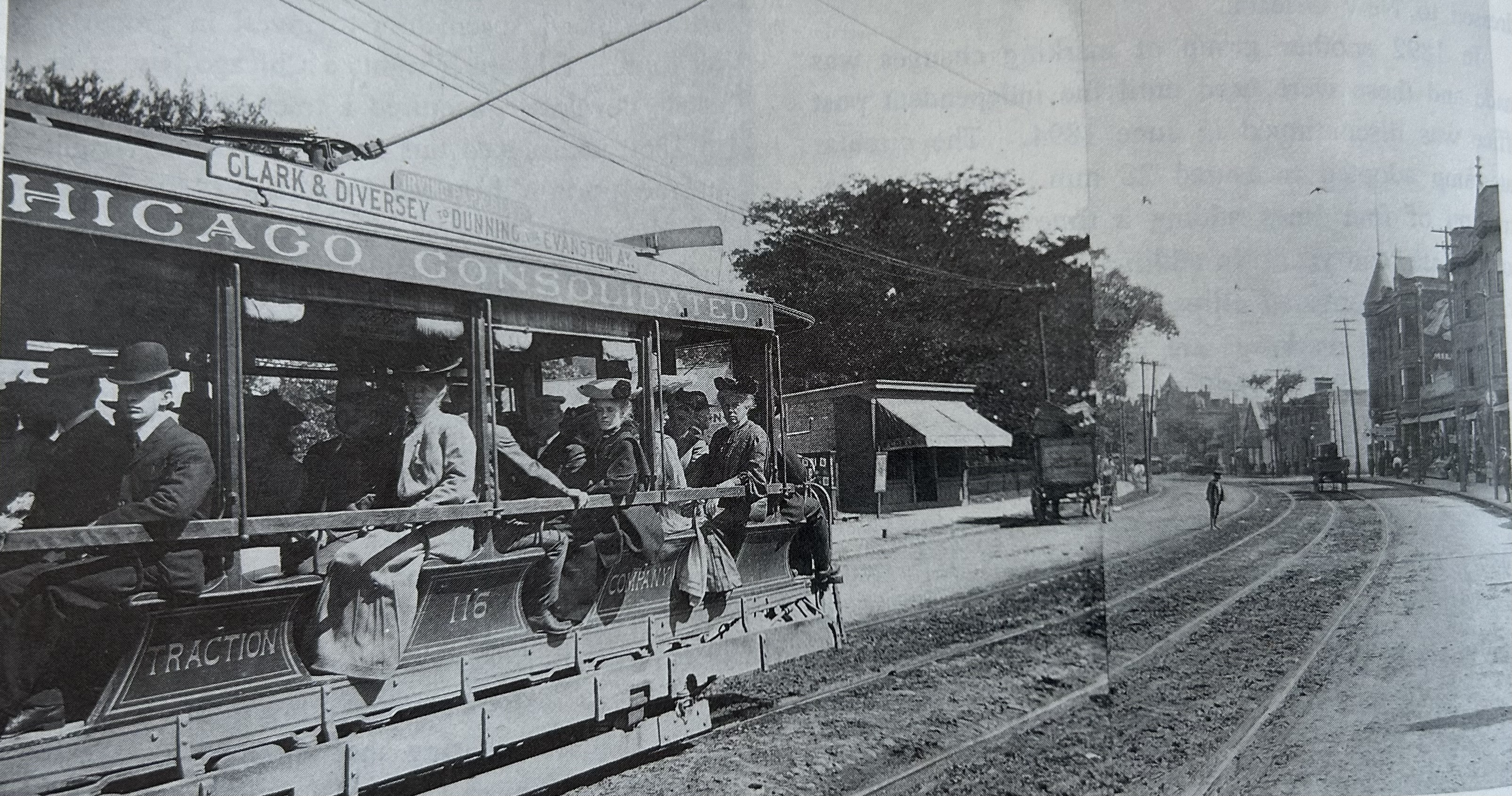
Streetcar line, Dunning, c. 1900

The growing settlement around the depot also began to be referred to as Dunning. The town attracted newly arrived immigrants, including people of Swedish, German, and Polish descent. The Dunning area, approximately three square miles, was annexed to Chicago in 1889. It was primarily a farming region until 1910. The small business district centered around the railroad and streetcar terminals. The population dramatically expanded after 1920, increasing to 4000 residents. Wright Junior College was built in the area in 1934. Dunning reached a population peak of 43,856 in 1970, when the Chicago-Read Mental Health Center was established, replacing the old hospitals. The community experienced a resurgence of commercial, and residential growth in the 1980s and 1990s. By 2000, Dunning's population had climbed to 42,164.

Historical population
Census	Pop.	Note	%±
1930	19,659		—
1940	23,328		18.7%
1950	32,231		38.2%
1960	41,626		29.1%
1970	43,843		5.3%
1980	37,860		−13.6%
1990	36,957		−2.4%
2000	42,164		14.1%
2010	44,664		5.9%
2020	43,147		−3.4%

== Notable people ==
- Andrzej Czuma, 21st Polish Minister of Justice and member of the Sejm from Warsaw I. He lived in Dunning while a political refugee from the Polish People's Republic.
- Chester P. Majewski, member of the Illinois House of Representatives. He resided at 3906 North Oketo Avenue during his legislative tenure.
- Danny Seraphine, a founding member and former drummer for the band Chicago, is from Dunning.
