= Lake Seamen's Union =

United States labor union

The Lake Seamen's Union (LSU) was a labor union established in 1878, representing workers on ships in the Great Lakes who were based in the United States. In 1919, the union was renamed the Sailors' Union of the Great Lakes. It was dissolved in 1937.

== History ==
The union was founded in 1878 by Richard Powers. In 1881, it affiliated to the new Federation of Organized Trades and Labor Unions, with Powers becoming that organization's first president. In 1892, the union hosted the conference which founded the new National Union of Seamen of America, soon renamed as the International Seamen's Union (ISU).

While the union originally covered all seamen, firemen soon became organized by the International Longshoremen's Association. In 1901, many marine cooks left to join the Hotel and Restaurant Employees' International Alliance. The following year, one local based in Buffalo, New York, decided to rejoin the ISU, and became the new Marine Cooks' and Stewards' Association of the Great Lakes.

From 1903 until 1908, the union signed annual agreements on wages and working conditions with the Lake Carriers' Association. In 1909, the carriers refused to sign a new agreement, and instead enforced a new open shop arrangement. In response, the LSU launched a strike, which lasted until 1912, but was unsuccessful. The union threatened another strike in 1917, but this was settled with a pay increase and an agreement to remove personal comments from discharge certificates, which had been used to blacklist union activists.

From 1909, the union's leading figure was secretary Victor Olander. Membership of the union varied considerably: from 1,000 in 1899, to 8,300 in 1905, just 1,300 in 1915, but recovering to 3,200 in 1919. That year, the union was renamed as the Sailors' Union of the Great Lakes. It appears to have dissolved in 1937, along with the ISU.
