= Cook County Poor Farm, Illinois =

American public Institution, 1851–1912

Cook County Poor Farm
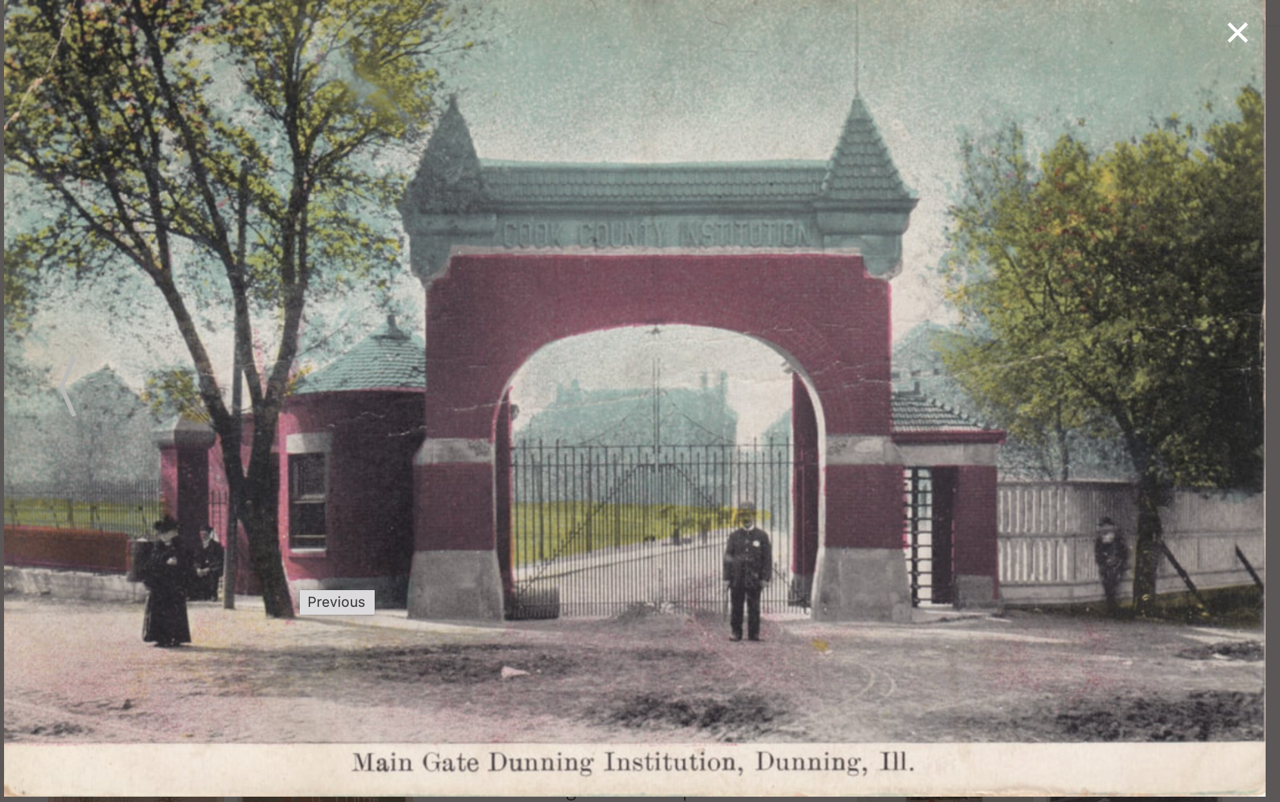
- Main gate, Dunning
- Alternative names: Dunning, Dunning Poorhouse and Insane Asylum

General information
- Status: Demolished
- Type: Poorhouse and Insane Asylum
- Architectural style: Victorian
- Location: Bounded by Irving Park Road, Naragansett Street, Montrose Ave, Oak Park Avenue, Dunning, United States
- Coordinates: 41.956°N 87.791°W
- Opened: 1854
- Closed: 1912
- Owner: Cook County, Illinois

Technical details
- Grounds: 320 acres

The Cook County Poor Farm (also known as the Dunning Poorhouse and Insane Asylum) was a public almshouse and institutional complex operated by Cook County, Illinois, established in 1851 to house the indigent, infirm, and mentally ill. The 320-acre site, located northwest of Chicago in what later became the Dunning neighborhood, included a poorhouse, insane asylum, cemetery, farm, and later a tuberculosis hospital and infirmary.

For much of the late 19th century, the Poor Farm served as Cook County’s principal public welfare institution and burial ground for indigent or unclaimed dead, but it was repeatedly criticized for overcrowding, neglect, and abuse. Responsibility for its facilities was assumed by the State of Illinois in the early 20th century, and the property was sold to the state in 1912. The original buildings were later demolished, and the site was redeveloped.

== Description ==
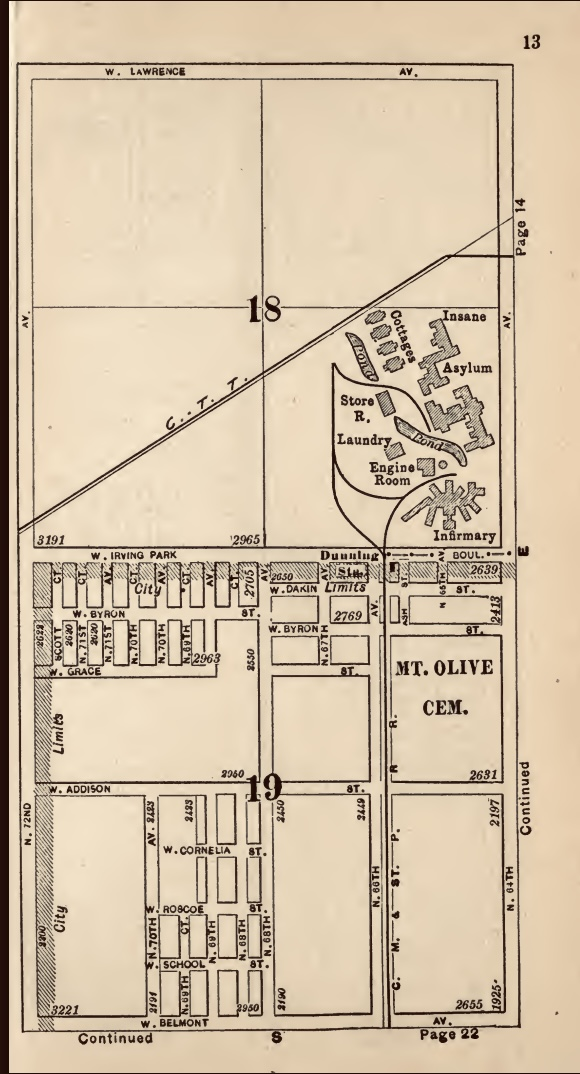
1900 street map, Dunning

The 320-acre Poor Farm was located near the intersection of Irving Park Road and Narragansett Avenue, about 10 miles (16 km) northwest of downtown Chicago. It was originally bordered by Irving Park Road, Narragansett Avenue, Montrose Avenue, and Oak Park Avenue.

A three-story brick poorhouse, completed in 1854 at a cost of $25,000, was the first major structure on the site. Early facilities also included a second brick building and several wood-frame structures. Major institutional expansions followed, including Cook County Hospital (1863–1866), a new Insane Asylum (1870), the Infirmary (1885), and the Tuberculosis (Consumptive) Hospital (1903). At its peak in 1910, the complex housed more than 1,700 poorhouse inmates and over 2,200 asylum patients.

By the early 20th century, the site included numerous auxiliary facilities, such as administration buildings, cottage wards, ice house, drug store, gas house, storehouses, barns, slaughterhouse, steam laundry, engine house, firehouse, nurses’ quarters, and a crematory.

The complex was commonly known as the “Poor Farm,” “County Farm,” or simply “Dunning.” Official institutional names used at various times included the Cook County Insane Asylum and Infirmary, Cook County Poorhouse, Cook County Almshouse, Cook County Infirmary, Cook County Old-Age Home, County House, and Poorhouse and County Farm, reflecting changes in public welfare policy and terminology over time.

== History ==
County Poor Farm, c. 1900

The first almshouse in Cook County, Illinois, was built in 1835 and was located in Chicago at the intersection of Clark and Randolph streets. Funded and supervised by the Cook County Board of Commissioners, the almshouse provided refuge for the destitute, the insane, single mothers and their children, the elderly, infirm, and physically and mentally disabled residents of Cook County. In 1841, the county decided to establish a county poor farm outside the city limits, in Lake Township, south of Chicago. Chicago historian Richard C. Lindberg wrote that officials believed it was better to isolate the indigent and mentally ill "far away from the city proper.” The Lake Township farm operated until 1854, when inmates were transferred to the new County Poor Farm in Jefferson Township.

=== Early years (1851–1862) ===
In 1851, the Cook County Board of Commissioners purchased 160 acres in Jefferson Township, as the site for a new poorhouse and insane asylum. Initially, both facilities together were collectively known as the Cook County Poor Farm and were housed in a three-story brick building costing $25,000. In 1854, the first 76 residents were transferred from the Lake Township almshouse to the new facility. Clinical psychologist Joseph J. Mehr wrote that early services were minimal: “What they really provided were a place to sleep and food...and that was pretty much the extent of it.”

The new Poorhouse initially housed both indigent residents and people classified as insane. Adjacent to the main building was a smaller two-story wing with narrow, barred windows used for insane inmates. Cells measured approximately 7 by 8 feet, with small openings in the doors for passing food.

The County Commissioners administered funds, appointed staff, and selected the County Agent, who admitted inmates and distributed "outdoor relief", temporary funds granted to impoverished, injured or ill residents living outside the institution. In 1855, the commissioners expanded the complex to include tuberculosis patients. A school was added in the 1860s for children living at the Poor Farm

=== Expansion (1863–1900) ===
==== New hospitals ====
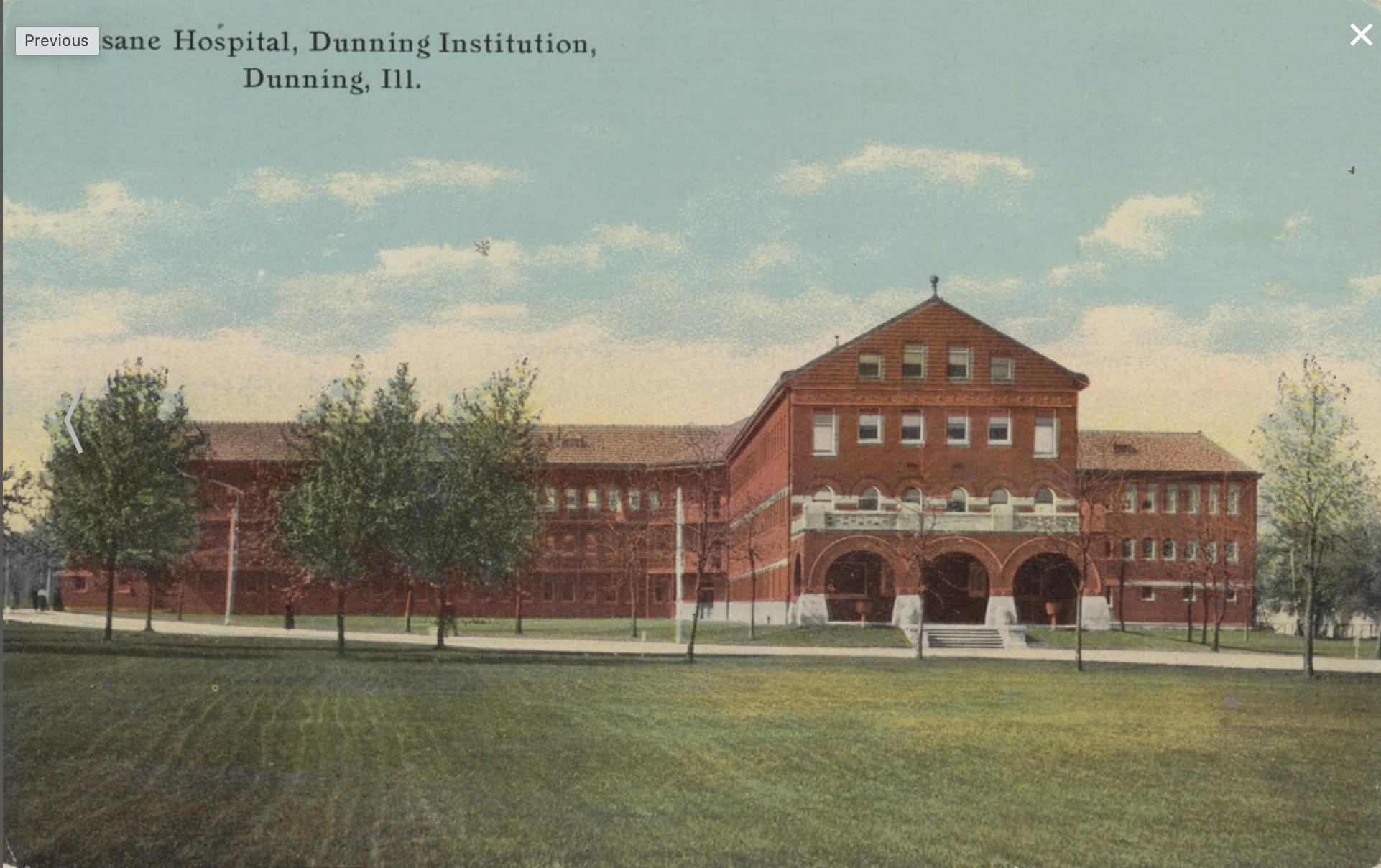
Postcard, Dunning Insane Asylum c. 1900

In August 1863, the county established a general hospital on site and transferred patients from Mercy Hospital in downtown Chicago to a hospital building at the Poor Farm. The hospital treated inmates as well as patients brought in from the surrounding area. The facility closed in January 1866, and patients were transferred to a public hospital.

By 1868, the original brick building housing both the Poorhouse and Insane Asylum inmates was deteriorating and had become a potential fire hazard. The county decided to construct a separate Insane Asylum approximately 200 feet south of the Poorhouse. Construction began in 1869, and the three-story building was completed in 1870 at a cost of $135,000.

The new Insane Asylum initially contained three floors with four wards on each per floor; a fourth story was added in 1873. A center administrative section was flanked by ward wings extending along wide corridors. Bathrooms with hot and cold running water were installed on each floor. A rear service building housed the kitchen, bakery and laundry, with staff apartments on the 2nd floor. Meals were prepared in the service building and brought to the ward dining rooms by rolling carts. In 1871, additional living space was added to the basement. By 1878, the building exceeded its intended capacity of 350 inmates; of the 437 residents, approximately 100 slept on the floor.

==== Conditions and reconstruction ====
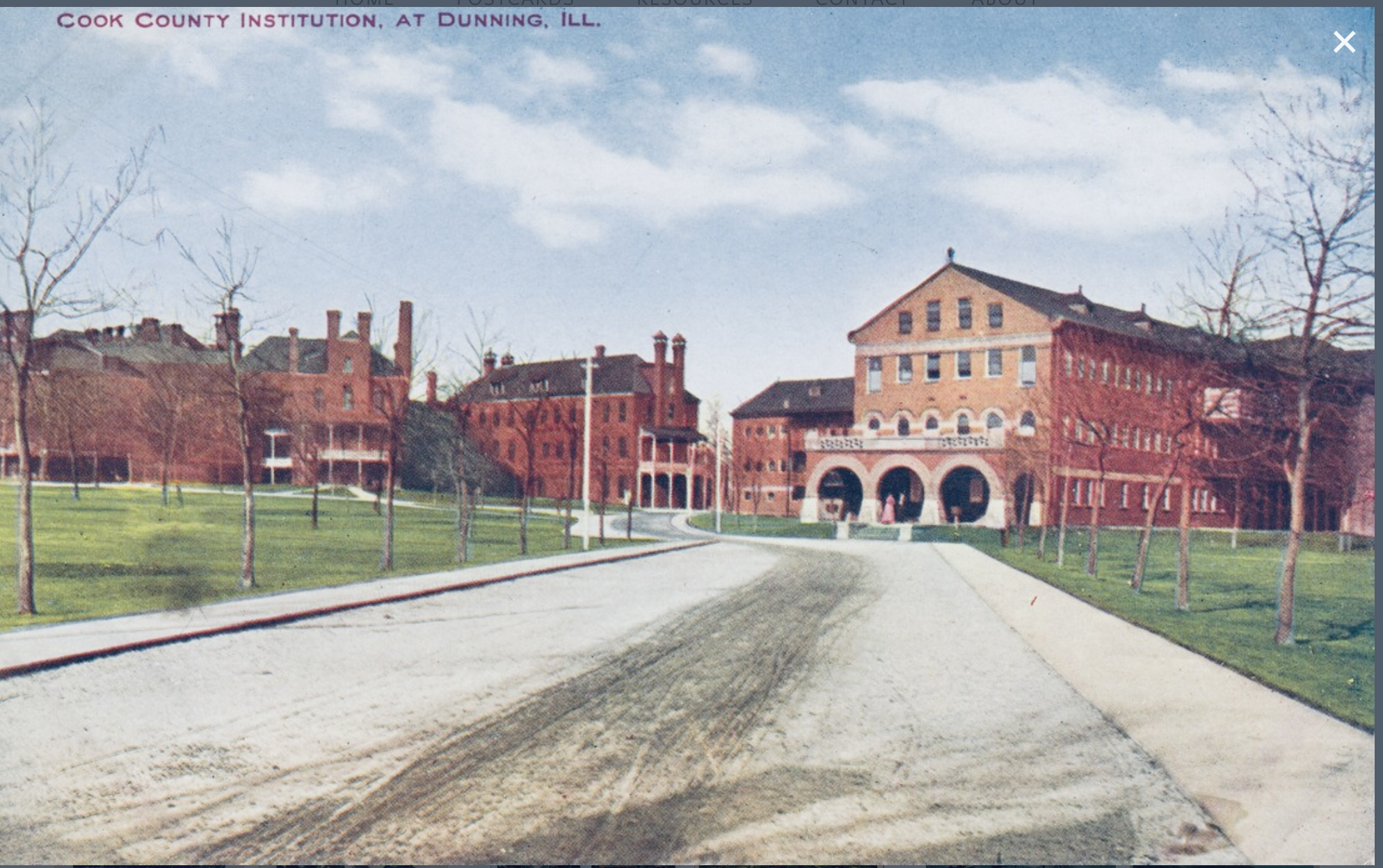
Postcard, Dunning, c. 1905

In 1878, County Commissioners visiting the Poor Farm noted its advanced state of disrepair, describing it as "an old rookery which should be torn down." Living and sleeping areas were reported to be dirty and infested with vermin, and the commissioners recommended the existing buildings be replaced with a new institutional complex.

The 1878 Biennial Report of the Board of State Commissioners of Public Charities of Illinois disclosed the current state of the Poor Farm buildings. The Poorhouse and Insane Asylum together contained 1,300 inmates; 800 were Poorhouse residents with 150 children, and 350 were asylum inmates. The original three-story Poorhouse contained 24 rooms sheltering elderly and infirm women, with a dining room, kitchen, and laundry in the basement. The adjacent original asylum building was no longer in use for psychiatric patients. Surrounding the Poorhouse were wood-frame cottages housed inmates in large open wards with rows of iron bedsteads and little privacy. With no hot water, inmates were rarely bathed, and the commissioners considered the buildings barely habitable.

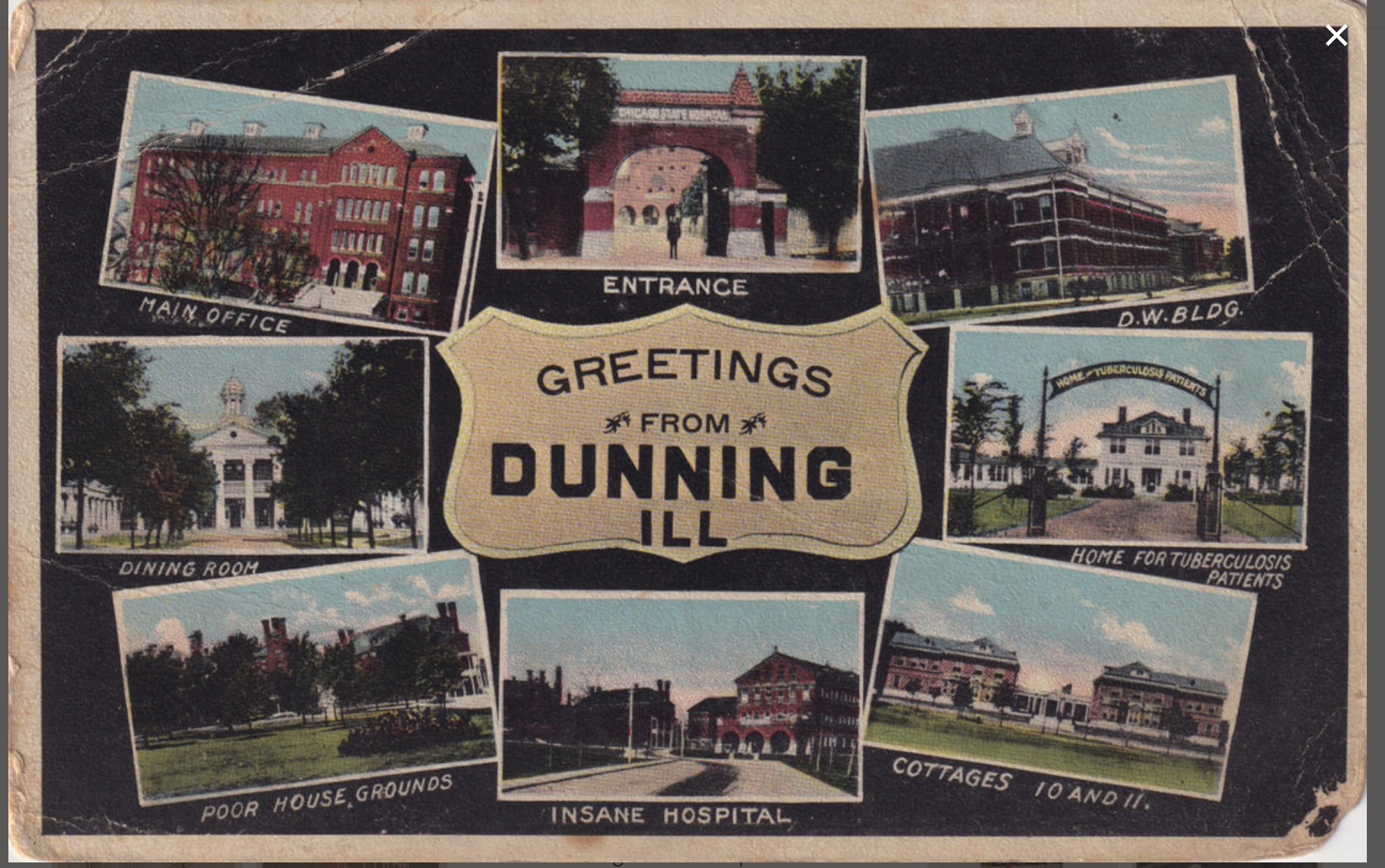
Postcard, Dunning, c. 1905

By 1882, overcrowding and structural detioration led the county to construct a new Poorhouse, renamed the Infirmary, on the southern edge of the property near Irving Park Road. The large brick complex was designed to house approximately 1,000 inmates, with a central core and radiating residential wings. Before 1882, both the Infirmary and the Insane Asylum were managed directly by the Cook County Commissioners; afterward, day-to-day administration was delegated to a warden for the Infirmary and a superintendent for the Asylum.

In 1885, separate cottage-style ward buildings of the Insane Asylum were completed at a cost of $135,000. Dunning was among the first asylums in the United States to appoint female physicians, including Dr. Delia Howe, (appointed May 1, 1884) and Dr. Harriet Alexander (appointed February 1, 1885). In 1890, four additional buildings, a biological laboratory, and an autopsy house were added., and a new schoolhouse was built for the children of the inmates.

==== Dunning train depot ====
The nearest railroad station to the Poor Farm was in the town of Jefferson, about two miles (3.2 km) to the east. To improve transportation of patients, visitors, and construction supplies to the expanding complex, the Cook County Commissioners built a 3-mile (4.8 km) branch line and arranged for daily service by the Milwaukee and St. Paul Railway. The track ran between Mount Olive Cemetery and Zion Gardens Cemetery and terminated at the Poor Farm.

A new train depot was built northeast of the Infirmary, at the southeast corner of Irving Park Road and Nashville Avenue. It was named "Dunning" after the Dunning family who conveyed land to Cook County for the rail line and station. The depot name later became the common name for the Poor Farm complex, which was widely known as “Dunning” until its closure in 1912.

==== Tuberculosis hospital (1899–1907) ====
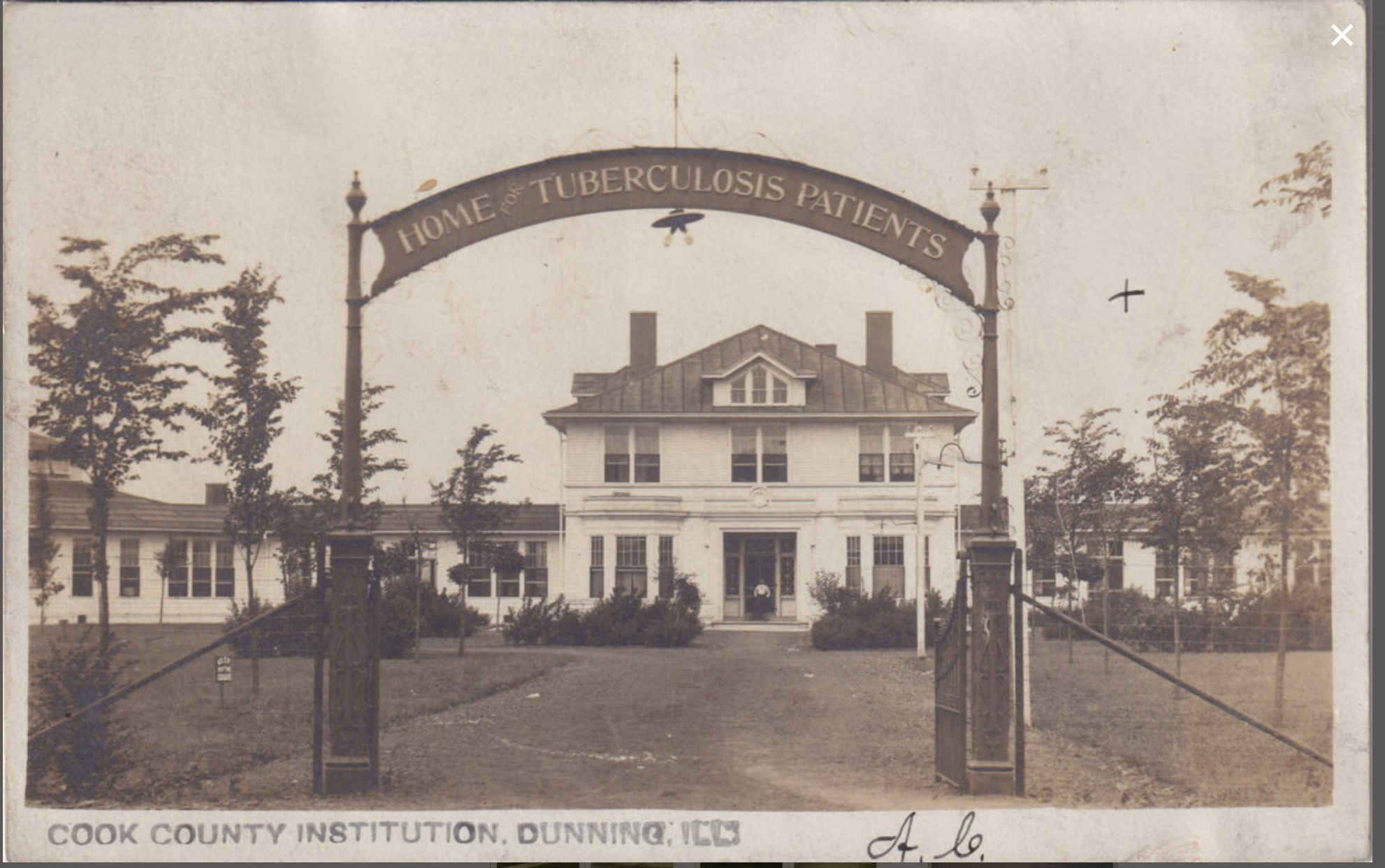
Tuberculosis Hospital, Dunning

The majority of consumptive (tubercular) patients in Cook County were cared for at Cook County Hospital in Chicago until 1899. Consumptive inmates at the Poor Farm were housed in a small building designated No. 9. In 1899, the county decided to build its third major institution at Dunning, a tuberculosis Hospital. The hospital was built in the southeast corner of the property, near the intersection of Narragansett and Irving Park Road. Known as the Tuberculosis Pavilion, it opened in late 1903 as a five-building wood-frame complex. The central building served as the administration building and dining hall, and each of the five residential wards measured 52 x 65 ft. A two-story building was added in 1907 for patients with advanced Tuberculosis patients.

=== Escalating costs and closure (1900–1912) ===
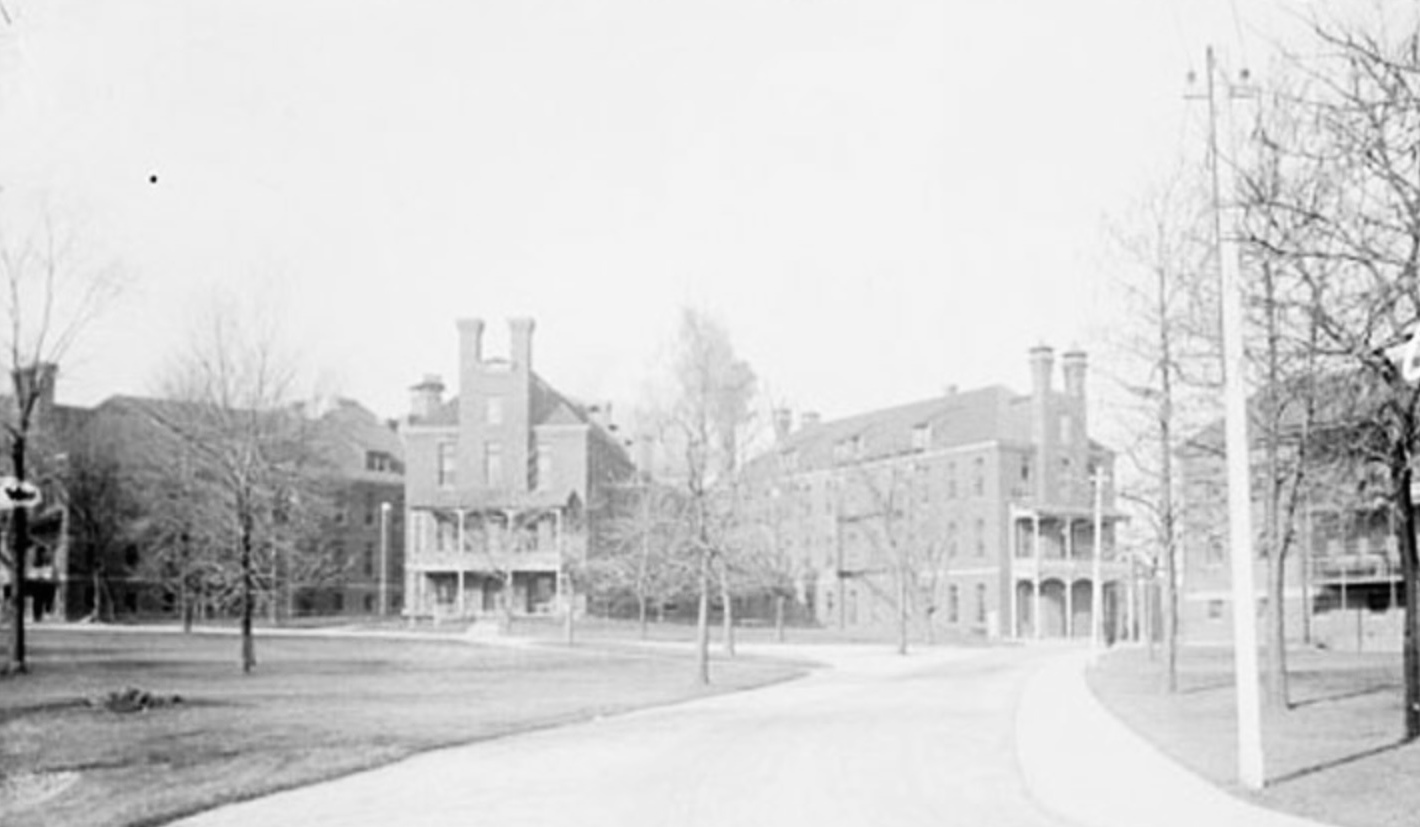
Poor Farm buildings, c. 1910

After 1900, the County Board of Commissioners faced rising costs associated with maintaining the aging Poor Farm buildings and caring for a growing inmate population. Many structures were overcrowded and in poor condition. The county appealed to the State of Illinois to assume responsibility for the care of the mentally ill and mentally disabled. In 1909, the Illinois general assembly passed legislation titled "An Act to Revise the Laws Relating to Charities," which made state responsibility for the insane mandatory and authorized the transfer of patients from county poorhouses to state hospitals.

Cook County agreed to sell the Poor Farm property and buildings to the state for one dollar. The county purchased 254 acres in Bremen Township to construct a new infirmary and tuberculosis hospital. The new facility, later known as "Oak Forest Hospital", was designed to house up to 2300 patients. On November 26, 1910, 250 infirmary inmates were transferred to Oak Forest, followed by the remaining 1731 inmates in December 1910. A tuberculosis hospital opened there in 1912. The remaining 269 patients at Dunning were housed in former infirmary and tuberculosis buildings at Dunning.

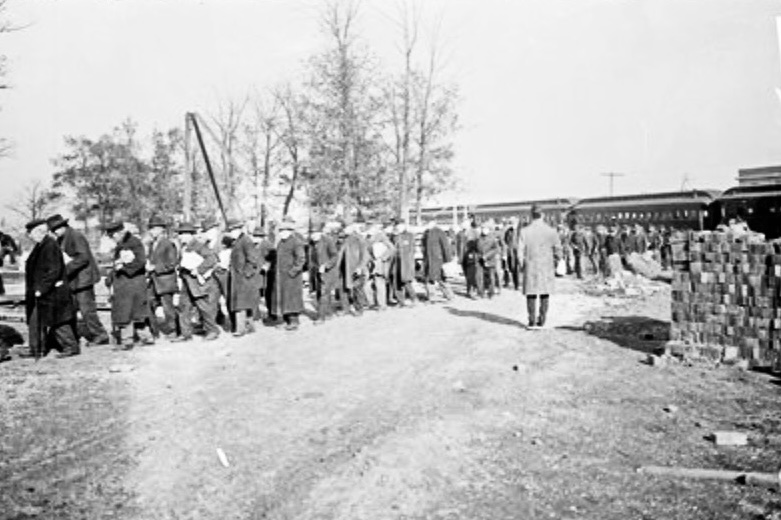
Inmates arriving at Oak Forest, 1910

From December 1910 to June 29, 1912, Cook County continued to supervise operations at Dunning, but many of the poor, infirm and tuberculosis patients had relocated to Oak Forest. The remaining population consisted primarily asylum patients. On June 29, 1912, Cook County formally transferred the Dunning property–then valued at $1,519,128–to the State of Illinois for one dollar. The state assumed control of the asylum on July 1, 1912, renaming it the Chicago State Hospital, although the site continued to be known locally as "Dunning". The tuberculosis pavilion was leased back to the county until 1915.

The Chicago State Hospital closed in 1970, and most of the property was subsequently sold. The original Poor Farm buildings no longer exist, and the former site is now occupied by residential development, Wright College, and Dunning Square shopping center.

== Operations and facilities ==
=== Farm operations ===
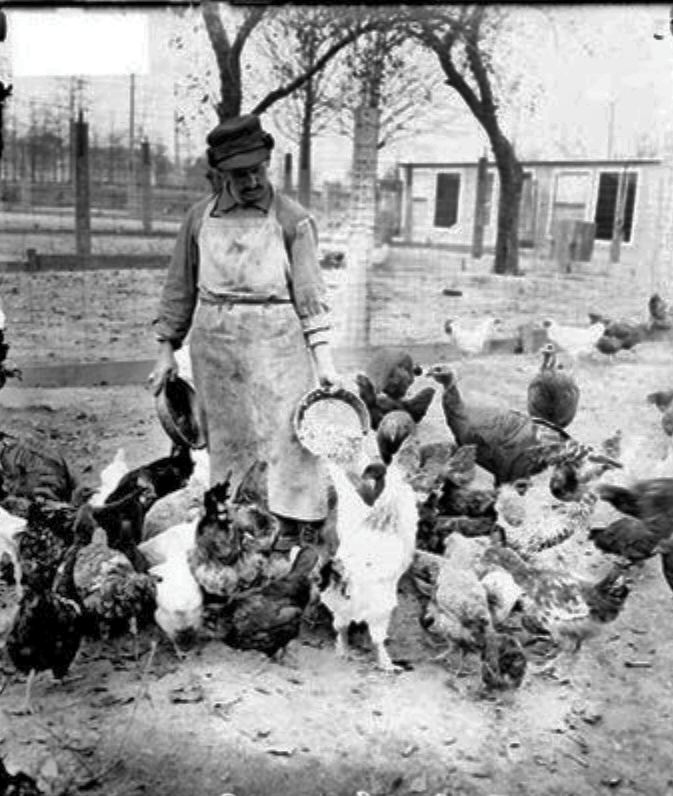
Feeding chickens, Poor Farm, 1914

Like many 19th-century almshouses, the Cook County Poor Farm operated as a self-sufficient institutional farm, with inmates providing much of the agricultural labor and household production. When the Poor Farm opened in 1854, the first farm building listed was a barn with a fenced yard and eight cows. This marked the beginning of a large institutional dairy that eventually provided milk, cheese and butter for more than 1300 residents and staff. In 1861, Warden S.B. Chase reported that the farm's stock and produce included 16 cows, 30 hogs, 30 bushels of millet, 378 bushels of oats, 10 tons of hay, 600 bushels of corn, 100 bushels of onions, beans, potatoes, in addition to dairy products for inmate meals.

Over time, the farm produced most of the fruit, vegetables, dairy products and meat consumed at the institution. Crops such as oats, corn, barley, and hay were grown for livestock feed, and hogs were raised and butchered for meat. Female inmates made soap and produced much of the clothing worn by residents. Able-bodied inmates worked in agricultural roles, while women also performed indoor labor such as cooking, sewing, knitting, and laundry. Linens, quilts, shirts, and sheets were spun from flax grown on the farm.

In 1914, after the Poor Farm had been sold to the state, the working farm continued to supply the Chicago State Hospital. At that time, fifteen of the farm's 110 acres were under cultivation, producing vegetables, strawberries, grapes and other crops. Farm inventories listed 260 hogs, 1000 chickens, 100 ducks, 7600 gallons of sauerkraut, and 3,000 gallons of pickles.

=== Burial grounds ===
Deaths occurred regularly at the Poor Farm. In the 1850s inmates were buried in the on-site cemetery. In the early 1860s, the original cemetery had reached its capacity and workers started burying the dead behind the main buildings. By the late 1860s, with the growing inmate population, additional burial space was required. In 1869, the county relocated a 20-acre section of the burial grounds that was situated too close to the insane asylum, moving it approximately 300 yards to the west.

After the City Cemetery at North Avenue and Clark Street closed in 1870, the Poor Farm was designated as Cook County's official burial grounds for indigent or unclaimed dead. Additional burial areas were established on the property as earlier sections filled. By 1890, approximately 1,000 county burials were conducted each year. At that time, the burial grounds east of the railroad line on Normandy Avenue were full and a new burial ground was opened west of Oak Park Avenue.

== Selected investigations ==
Numerous complaints and investigations concerning conditions at the Cook County Poor Farm were recorded throughout its operation. The following incidents illustrate documented oversight actions and public concerns.

On April 4, 1860, several complaints were submitted to the County Board of Commissioners regarding the incompetence and neglect of the Poorhouse physician, prompting a recommendation for a formal investigation. In 1862, a report to the Board of Commissioners raised concerns about conditions in the Insane Asylum, stating that the facility was "nothing more than a place of confinement." These findings contributed to the county's decision to build a new separate asylum building.

In 1874, a reporter for the Chicago Tribune described the Poorhouse as "a shambling, helter-skelter series of wooden buildings" where dejected-looking people with matted hair and tattered clothing were "crowded and herded together like sheep in the shambles, or hogs in the slaughtering-pens." An attendant was quoted as saying, "The rooms swarm with vermin. The cots and bed-clothing are literally alive with them. We cannot keep the men clean, and we cannot drive the parasites away unless they are clean."

In March 1874, a Cook County grand jury visited the Poor Farm to assess inmate conditions. The jury reported that the Poorhouse wards were clean and warm and that clothing was adequate. However, they criticized the quality of the food, noting that meat was unpalatable and vegetables were limited to turnips; they described tea as appearing to be made "from sweepings from the floor".

In 1885, complaints were raised regarding political patronage appointments that resulted in "inexperienced and incapable attendants." That year, Dr. Harriet Alexander publicly criticized conditions at the Insane asylum, reporting severe overcrowding, inadequate clothing, poor food, unsanitary wards, and abusive attendants.

In 1889, former inmates testified in court about physical abuse by attendants, including broken bones and the fatal beating of an inmate named Levi. In 1895, attendants were investigated for the death of George Pucik, an inmate who was reportedly kicked to death; a jury ultimately found the attendants not guilty due to insufficient evidence.

Following the Pucik case, the Illinois General Assembly appointed Kate Bradley to investigate conditions at Dunning. Bradley reported that while wards were generally clean and orderly, the asylum was severely overcrowded and understaffed, with two attendants responsible for 30 to 40 patients. She also noted that the food was adequate, but that the water was insufficient.

== See also ==
- Chicago-Read Mental Health Center
- Read Dunning Memorial Park
