= Niels Juul =

American politician

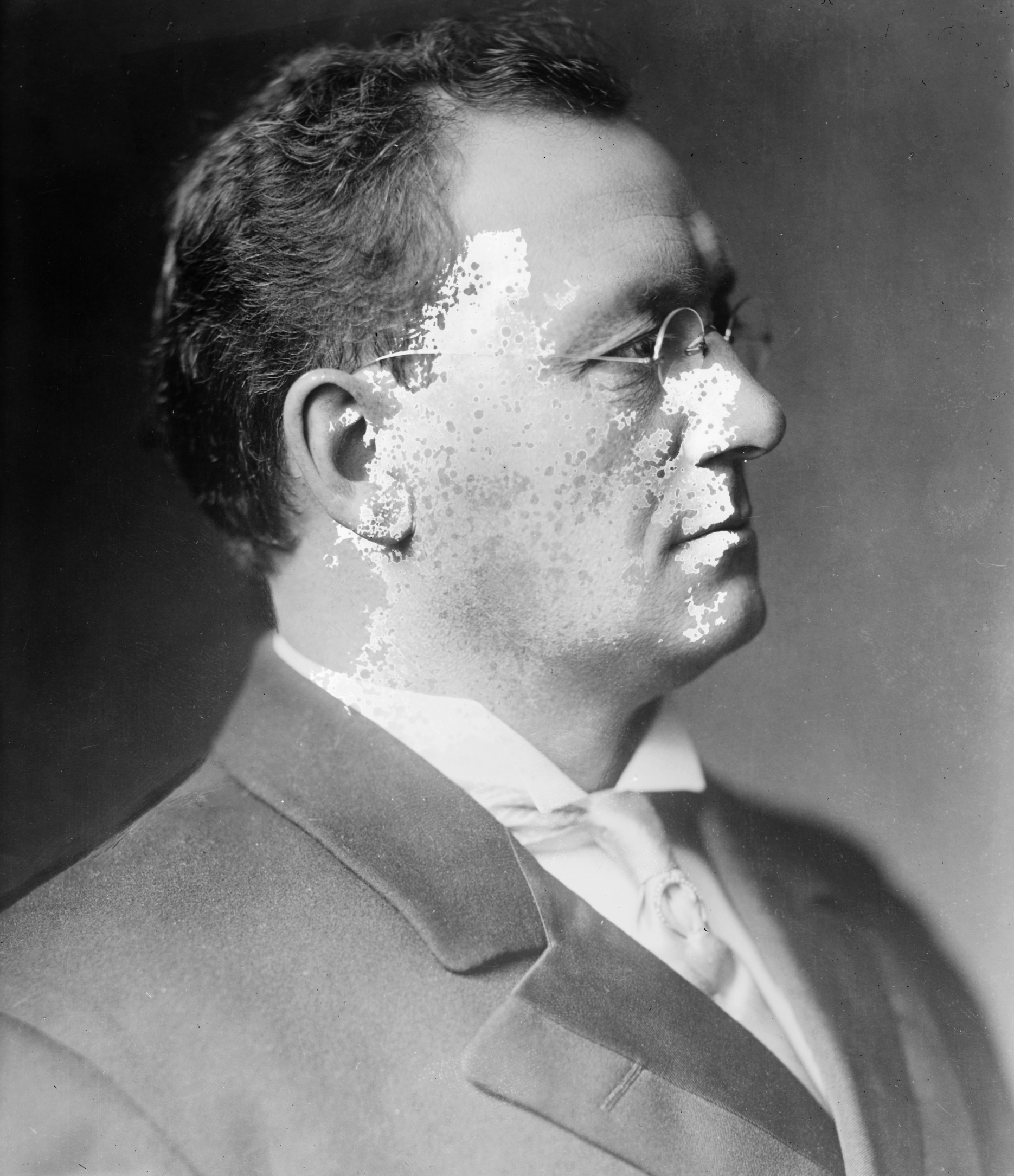

Member of the U.S. House of Representatives from Illinois's 7th district
- In office March 4, 1917 – March 3, 1921
- Preceded by: Frank Buchanan
- Succeeded by: M. Alfred Michaelson

Personal details
- Born: April 27, 1859 Randers, Midtjylland, Denmark
- Died: December 4, 1929 (aged 70) Chicago, Illinois, United States
- Resting place: Mount Olive Cemetery
- Party: Republican
- Children: Herb Juul

Niels Juul (April 27, 1859 – December 4, 1929) was a state senator and U.S. Representative from Illinois. He was born and raised in Denmark.

== Biography ==
Juul was born in Randers in Midtjylland, Denmark. Juul attended the public school (realskole) in Randers. He emigrated to the United States and settled in Chicago, Illinois, in 1880. He engaged in the publishing business. He studied law, and graduated from the law department of Lake Forest University in 1898. He was admitted to the bar in 1899 and commenced practice in Chicago.

He was an alternate delegate to 1892 Republican National Convention from Illinois. He served as a member of the Illinois Senate from 1898 to 1914. He served as assistant attorney of the Sanitary District of Chicago from 1907 to 1911. Juul was elected as a Republican from Illinois's 7th congressional district to the Sixty-fifth and Sixty-sixth Congresses (March 4, 1917 - March 3, 1921). He was an unsuccessful candidate for renomination in 1920.

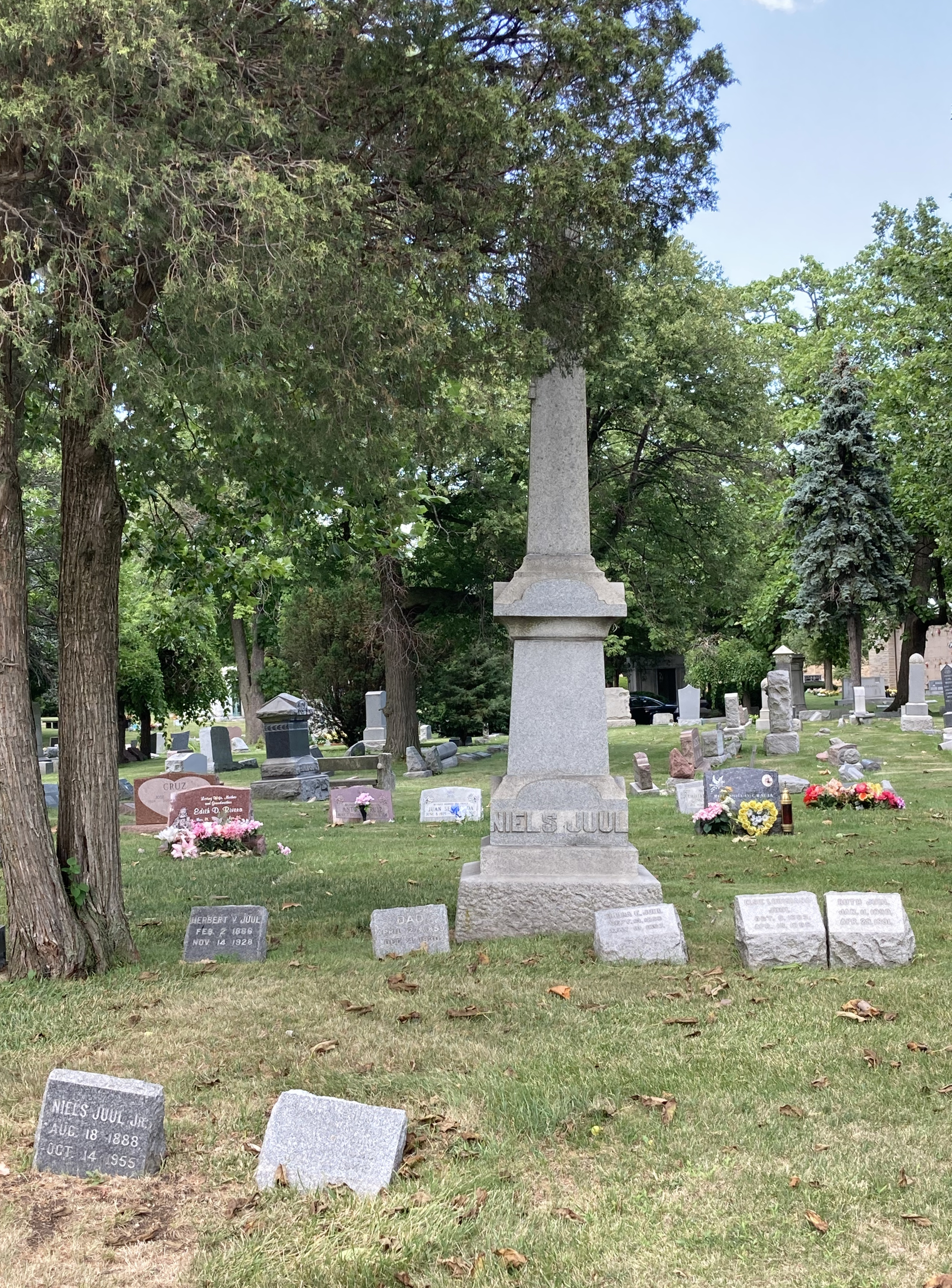
Juul's grave at Mount Olive Cemetery

He was appointed by President Warren G. Harding United States Collector of Customs for the Port of Chicago on January 1, 1921, and served until December 31, 1922, when he resigned. He resumed the practice of law until his death at Norwegian American Hospital in Chicago, on December 4, 1929.

== Personal life ==
Niels Juul was married to Hulda E Risberg Juul (1858-1897). They were the parents of three children including Illinois Fighting Illini men's basketball coach Herb Juul. Niels Juul died in 1929 and was interred in Mount Olive Cemetery in Chicago.

U.S. House of Representatives
Preceded by Frank Buchanan	Member of the U.S. House of Representatives from Illinois's 7th congressional district 1917-1921	Succeeded by M. Alfred Michaelson
