= Chicago-Read Mental Health Center =

Coordinates: 41.955°N 87.8°W

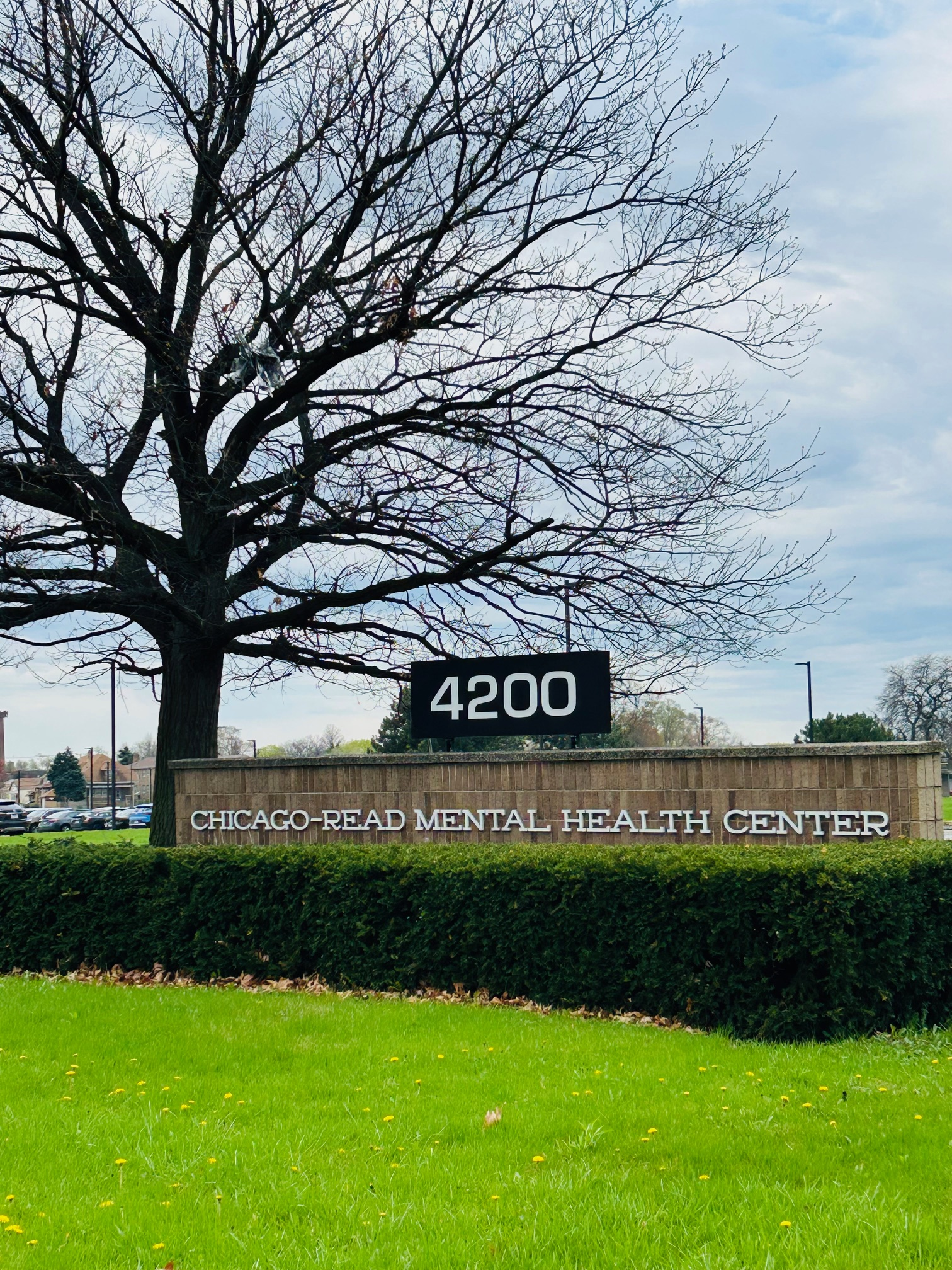
- Sign located at entrance to Chicago-Read Mental Health Center

Geography
- Location: Chicago, Illinois, United States

Services
- Beds: 250 to 300

Links
- Lists: Hospitals in Illinois

Chicago-Read Mental Health Center (CRMHC, often called simply Read) is a state-run inpatient JCAHO-accredited facility, located in the community of Dunning, northwest of Chicago, Illinois. In 1965, as a community alternative to state managed hospital care, the Charles F. Read Zone Center was established in Dunning as a mental health facility. It was located west of Oak Park Avenue. It later merged operations with Chicago State Hospital when it closed in 1970. The new inpatient mental health center was renamed the Chicago-Read Mental Health Center.

== History ==
Public institutions in Dunning have provided shelter and care for the mentally ill and destitute residents of Chicago since 1854, beginning with the Cook County Poor Farm (1854–1912). The Poor Farm was a large 320-acre complex with a Poorhouse, Insane Asylum, Tuberculosis Hospital and working farm. In 1912, Cook County sold the Dunning Poor Farm to the State of Illinois, who assumed responsibility for the Insane Asylum and renamed it the Chicago State Hospital. A fire at the State Hospital on 26 December 1923 killed fifteen people. Two wings of the hospital were destroyed. Press reports described the building as a "death house" even before the fire.

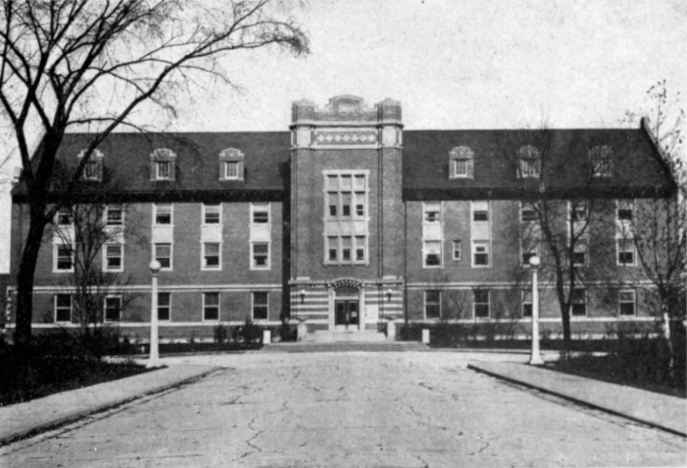
Chicago State Hospital Administration Building, 1922

In 1963, after the Community Mental Health Act was passed in the United States to provide federal funding for community mental health centers, Illinois built six "zone centers" providing community mental health treatment. The Charles F. Read Zone Center was established as a community alternative to state managed hospital care. Established in 1965, and located west of Oak Park Avenue, the Charles. F. Read Zone Center took over the operations of the Chicago State Hospital when it closed in 1970. The new facility was renamed the Chicago-Read Mental Health Center.

== Investigations ==
In 1988, the director of the facility was dismissed under what were described as deplorable conditions for patients; in 1992, it was under investigation for civil rights violations and in 1993, Read lost its accreditation altogether.

== Dunning-Read Natural Area ==
In 2002, developers proposed to build a Home Depot store on a parcel of land in the southwest corner of the hospital grounds, which was opposed by neighborhood groups looking to preserve open space in the area. In 2005, the state of Illinois designated it as the Dunning Read Conservation Area. The Chicago Park District took over the land in 2022. In 2025, the Park District gave the area the name Dunning-Read Natural Area, after having used the name Park 601.

== See also ==
- Elgin Mental Health Center
- Read Dunning Memorial Park
