= Victor Olander =

American labor leader (1873–1949)

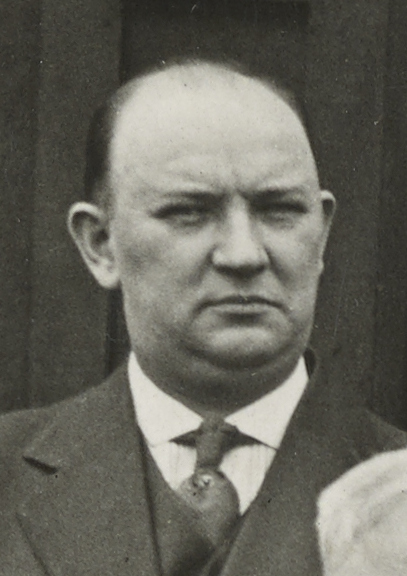
- Olander in 1918
- Born: Victor A. Olander; November 28, 1873; Chicago, Illinois, U.S.
- Died: February 5, 1949 (aged 75); Chicago, Illinois, U.S.
- Resting place: Mount Olive Cemetery
- Occupations: Labor organizer; businessman
- Spouse: Grace Elizabeth Cervenka (m. 1902)
- Children: 2

Victor A. Olander (November 28, 1873 – February 5, 1949) was an American labor union leader.

== Early life ==
Victor A. Olander was born on November 28, 1873, in Chicago. He had Norwegian–Swedish ancestry. He attended public school for six years before becoming a factory worker. After two years, he began working as a sailor on the Great Lakes at the age of 14. He then studied the law relating to seafarers.

== Career ==
In 1899, Olander joined the Lake Seamen's Union, an affiliate of the International Seamen's Union (ISU). He was active in the Chicago labor movement and was a delegate from the sailor's union to the Chicago Federation of Labor and the Illinois State Federation of Labor. In 1901, Olander was elected as business agent of the Lake Seamen, then as assistant secretary in 1903. In 1902, he was additionally elected as the second vice-president of the ISU. In 1909, Andrew Furuseth offered Olander the role of president of the ISU, but Olander declined it. From 1909 to 1920, he served as general secretary of the sailors' union of the Great Lakes. From 1914 to his death, he was secretary-treasurer of the Illinois Federation of Labor. He remained the head of the Great Lakes local chapter of the ISU. In 1913, he joined the ISU's legislative committee. In 1925, he was elected as the union's secretary-treasurer. He helped pass the Seamen's Act in the U.S. Congress.

During the Great Depression, Olander refused to support sailors' requests for emergency food and shelter. He was quoted saying that the ISU "is not organizing flophouse unions". Criticism of Olander caused him to leave his ISU role in 1935. During World War I, he served on the Illinois State Council of Defense, the National War Labor Board, and a local draft appeals board. He was a member of the resolutions committee of the American Federation of Labor and served as its secretary from 1927 to 1933.

== Personal life ==
Olander married Grace Elizabeth Cervenka on May 26, 1902. They had two daughters, Ruth and Grace Elizabeth. He was friends with William Z. Foster, but their relationship soured.

In 1916, Olander got cataracts and started to lose his sight. By 1919, he was completely blind. In 1925, he had an operation to fix his blindness.

Olander lived on North Mason Avenue in Chicago. He died on February 5, 1949, at Michael Reese Hospital in Chicago. He was buried in Mount Olive Cemetery.

Trade union offices
| Preceded by William Penje | Secretary of the Lake Seamen's Union; 1909–1920 | Succeeded by Patrick O'Brien |
| Preceded by James F. Morris | Secretary-Treasurer of the Illinois Federation of Labor; 1914–1949 | Succeeded by Earl J. McMahon |
| Preceded by K. B. Nolan | Secretary-Treasurer of the International Seamen's Union; 1925–1936 | Succeeded by Ivan Hunter |
