= Schorsch Irving Park Gardens Historic District =

- U.S. National Register of Historic Places
- U.S. Historic district
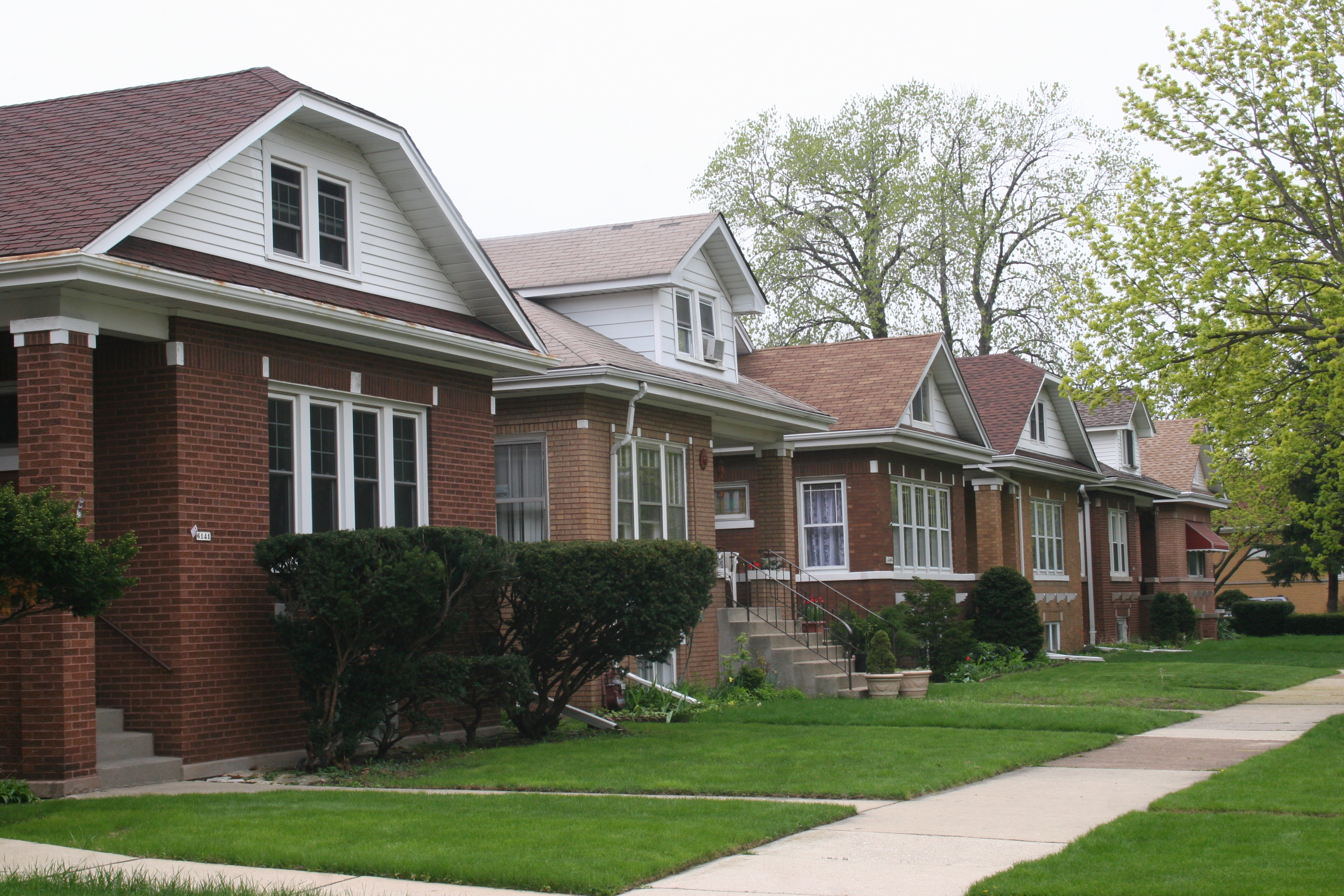

- Location within Chicago metropolitan area Location within Illinois Location within the United States
- Location: Roughly bounded by Grace St., Patterson Ave., N. Austin Ave., and N. Melvina Ave., Chicago, Illinois
- Coordinates: 41°57′00″N 87°46′45″W
- Area: 27 acres (11 ha)
- Architectural style: Chicago Bungalow
- MPS: Chicago Bungalows MPS
- NRHP reference No.: 04000075
- Added to NRHP: February 25, 2004

The Schorsch Irving Park Gardens Historic District is a residential historic district in the Dunning neighborhood of Chicago, Illinois.

The district includes 255 buildings, all but three of which are Chicago bungalows. In the early twentieth century, tens of thousands of Chicago bungalows were built in the city; as homeownership became more accessible to working-class Chicagoans, demand for housing increased, and bungalows were an affordable way of meeting this demand due to their relatively uniform design. The bungalows in the district were largely built either between 1917 and 1918 or between 1922 and 1926. Unlike Chicago's other bungalow-dominated neighborhoods, which often had several different developers, developer Albert J. Schorsch built every bungalow in the district, and architech Ernest N. Braucher designed all of them. To add diversity to a neighborhood made up of only one style of house, the two men varied the homes' roof shapes, colors, and dormers.

The district was added to the National Register of Historic Places on February 25, 2004.
