= M. Alfred Michaelson =

American politician

Magne Alfred Michaelson
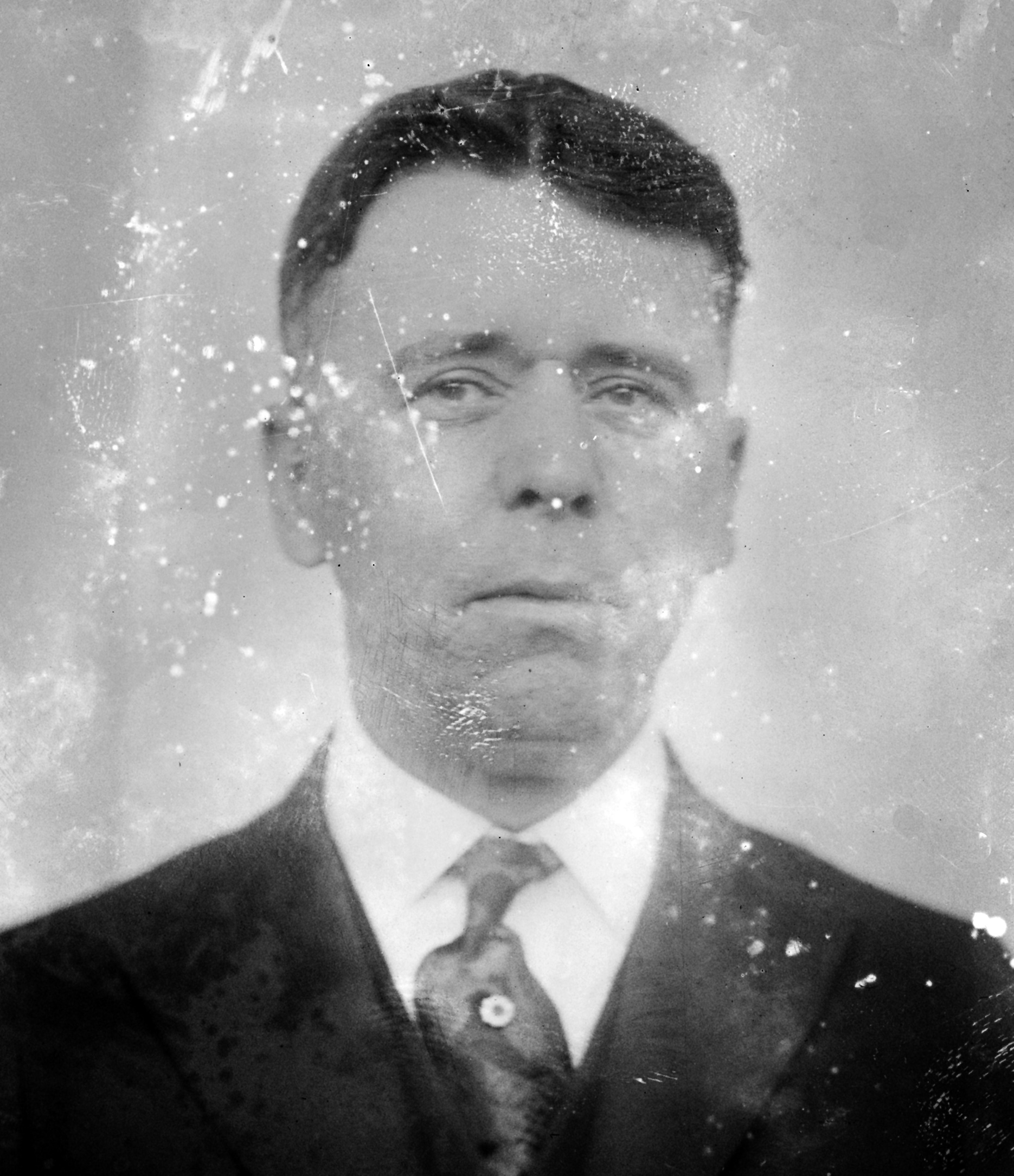

Member of the U.S. House of Representatives from Illinois's 7th district
- In office March 4, 1921 – March 3, 1931
- Preceded by: Niels Juul
- Succeeded by: Leonard W. Schuetz

Personal details
- Born: September 7, 1878 Kristiansand, Norway
- Died: October 26, 1949 (aged 71)
- Resting place: Mount Olivet Cemetery
- Party: Republican

Magne Alfred Michaelson (September 7, 1878 – October 26, 1949) was a U.S. representative from Illinois.

== Background ==
Michaelson was born at Kristiansand in Vest-Agder, Norway. In October 1885, Michaelson immigrated to the United States with his parents who settled in Chicago, Illinois. He attended the public schools and graduated from Chicago Normal School in 1898. He taught in the public schools of Chicago (1898–1914). He served as chairman of the board of directors of the Madison and Kedzie State Bank of Chicago (1924–1927).

== Political career ==
He served as a member of the Chicago City Council (1915–1918). He served as delegate to the State constitutional convention in 1920.

Michaelson was elected as a Republican candidate to the Sixty-seventh and to the four succeeding Congresses (March 4, 1921 – March 3, 1931). On August 15, 1921, he made a speech in the House in which he questioned the patriotism and integrity of the newly formed American Legion as being bought and controlled by the interests of Wall Street.

In 1929, Michaelson was charged with for a violation of the Volstead Act. His brother-in-law pleaded guilty and the judge issued a $1,000 fine. He was an unsuccessful candidate for renomination in 1930. He subsequently resumed his position in banking. He died on October 26, 1949.

== Note ==
U.S. House of Representatives
Preceded by Niels Juul	Member of the U.S. House of Representatives from Illinois's 7th congressional district 1921-1931	Succeeded by Leonard W. Schuetz
