= Read Dunning Memorial Park =

Historic burial site in Cook County, Illinois, US

Coordinates: 41.95566°N 87.79116°W

- Read Dunning Memorial Park entrance in 2025.
- Interactive map of Read Dunning Memorial Park
- Type: Memorial
- Location: Dunning, Chicago
- Designated: 2001

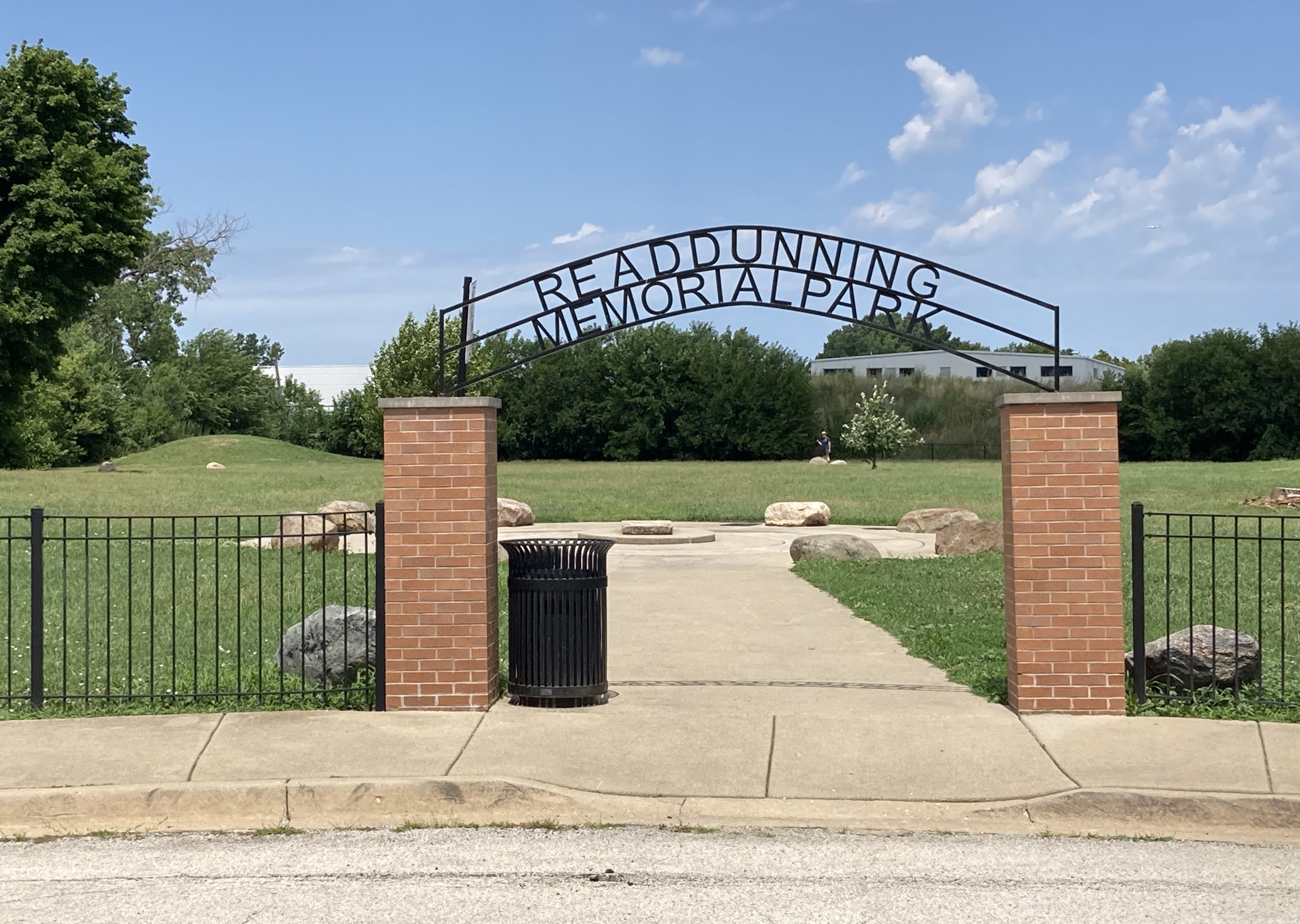
Read Dunning Memorial Park

Read Dunning Memorial Park is located in Dunning, Illinois. The three-acre site occupies a small portion of the former Cook County Cemetery, which served as the official burial ground for the poor and indigent of Cook County from the mid-19th century through the early 20th century. The cemetery was part of the Cook County Poor Farm, Illinois, a complex that included the Cook County Poorhouse, Consumptive Hospital, and Insane Asylum. It served as the county's primary potter's field for more than 70 years. Established in 2001, Read Dunning Memorial Park commemorates an estimated 38,000 destitute, unclaimed, and institutionalized individuals believed to be buried on the former cemetery grounds. Those buried included residents of the Poorhouse and Insane Asylum, victims of the Great Chicago Fire of 1871, Civil War veterans, and others who died without means or family to claim their remains.

== Description ==
An estimated 38,000 individuals were buried in the Cook County Cemetery, located on the grounds of the Cook County Poor Farm. The institution was bordered by Narragansett Avenue to the east, Irving Park Road to the south, and Harlem Avenue and Forest Preserve Drive to the north and northwest. Today, Read Dunning Memorial Park covers three acres of what was once a much larger burial complex. Near the middle of the park is an 1884 dedication stone from the Dunning Poor Farm, with eight historic markers placed around it. Seven concrete circles commemorating different groups buried at the cemetery are distributed throughout the park. The memorial park is accessible from West Belle Plaine Avenue near North Neenah Avenue.

== History ==
=== Dunning cemetery ===
The Dunning cemetery originated as the burial ground for the Cook County Poor Farm, an institutional complex created to provide care for the county's indigent population. The first facility on the site was the Poorhouse, which opened in 1854. An Insane Asylum followed in 1869, and additional facilities—including an infirmary and a Consumptive Hospital—were later built. As these institutions expanded, and the need for burial space grew, the cemetery played an important role within the complex. By the early 1870s, the cemetery came to serve as Cook County's primary potter's field. Beginning in 1872, unclaimed remains from Chicago City Cemetery—after its closure in 1866—were transferred to Dunning, significantly increasing the number of burials. During this period, the burial ground increasingly served not only residents of the Poor Farm, but also unclaimed dead from across the county.

In the 1880s, the burial ground became commonly known as the Cook County Cemetery. In 1890, the 20-acre cemetery reached capacity, requiring the addition of five acres near Irving Road and west of Oak Park Avenue. By 1899, burial space was again at capacity and the cemetery expanded further onto surrounding Poor Farm land. In 1912, the Poor Farm closed due to rising costs associated with overcrowding and aging facilities. The entire 320-acre site was sold to the State of Illinois and converted into the Chicago State Hospital. After the transfer of ownership, burials largely stopped, and the cemetery fell out of active use.

=== Burial grounds after 1912 ===
After 1912, no markers or stones remained to indicate the presence of a cemetery, and over time the burial ground disappeared from view. As the Chicago State Hospital expanded, new buildings were constructed on the site, covering portions of the former cemetery. In 1959, construction workers digging trenches on hospital grounds uncovered bodies in decayed wooden coffins buried in shallow graves. According to reporting by Terri Kruszczak's in the Norridge/Harwood Heights/Norwood Park Times. “There was some notion handed down from one staff generation to another that there was some poorhouse cemetery here.” The Chicago State Hospital closed in 1970 and the buildings were later demolished. The property was subsequently sold to developers, many of whom were not informed the land included a former cemetery.

Additional graves were uncovered in the 1980s when developers building new homes in Dunning unearthed several human remains. In 1989, a developer purchased a small section of the former Poor Farm property for residential development. Construction crews uncovered human skeletal remains. Work was paused and the site was examined, revealing more than 100 bodies. At that point, responsibility for the site fell to state officials charged with protecting unmarked burial grounds. An archaeological survey led by David Keene identified the largest concentration of human remains and revealed two intact cemeteries, indicating that three burial grounds had existed on the Poor Farm site.

=== Read Dunning Memorial Park ===
Reverend William Brauer, pastor of the Portage Park Presbyterian church, spoke out against development on the former cemetery site, expressing concerns through letters to local newspapers. Brauer's advocacy, along with the work of local citizens and historians, contributed to efforts to permanently memorialize the site. Documentation of the unnamed individuals buried at Dunning was also undertaken by Barry Fleig, the former cemetery chairman of the Chicago Genealogical Society. Fleig reviewed Cook County death records and coroner's reports and recovered the names of approximately 8,000 individuals believed to have been buried at the cemetery. In 2001, Read–Dunning Memorial Park was formally dedicated. The three-acre park was preserved as an open landscape, with concrete disks embedded in the ground to commemorate the different groups of people buried there.

== Read Dunning Memorial Park Gallery ==
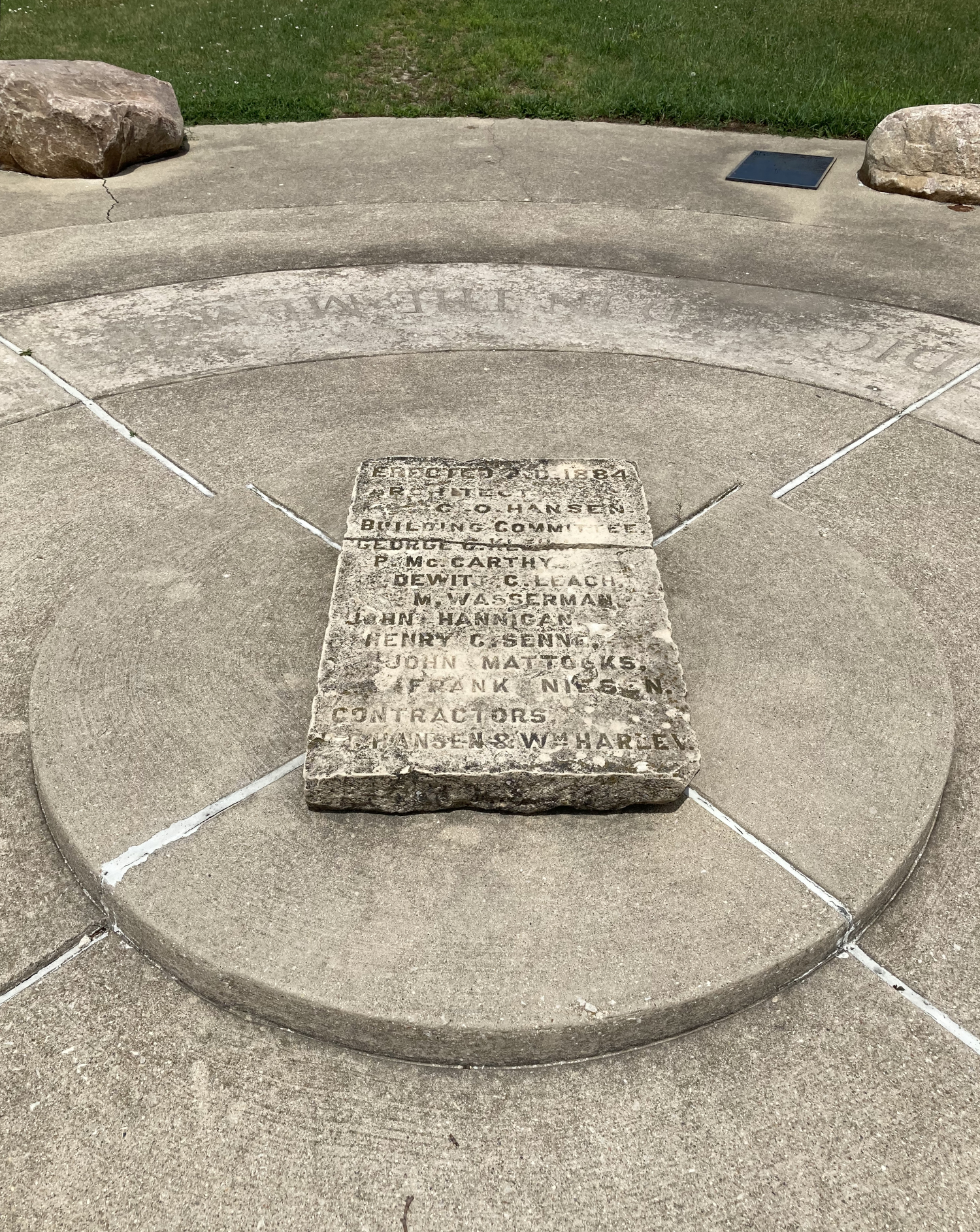
Center stone, Read Dunning memorial

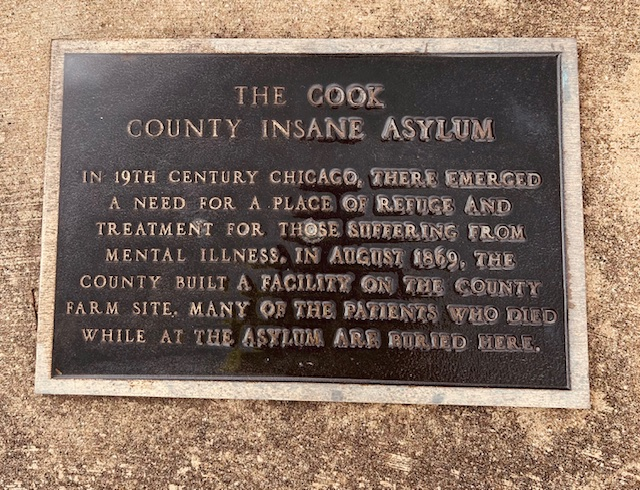
Insane Asylum historical marker

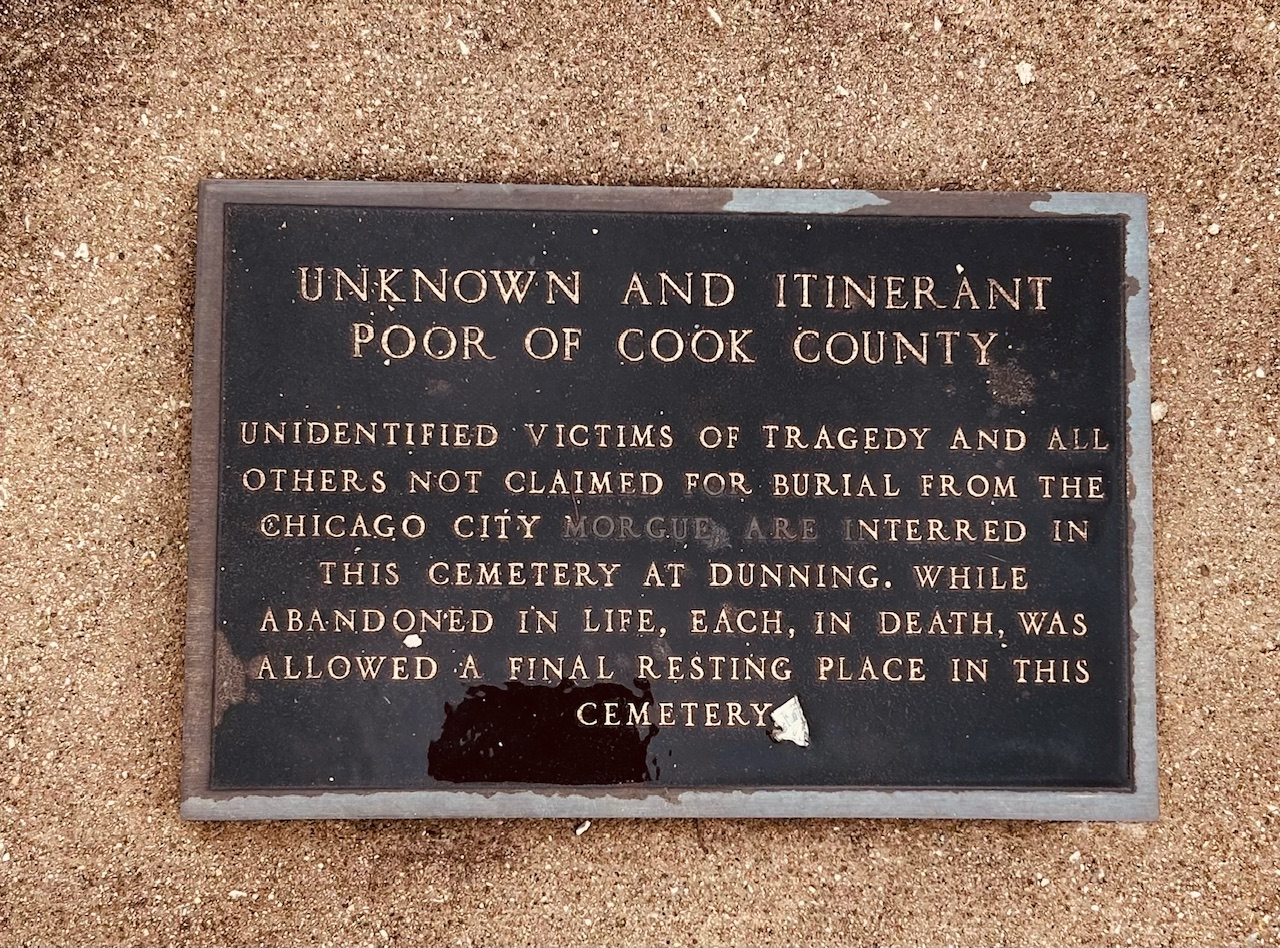
Itinerant and unclaimed historic marker

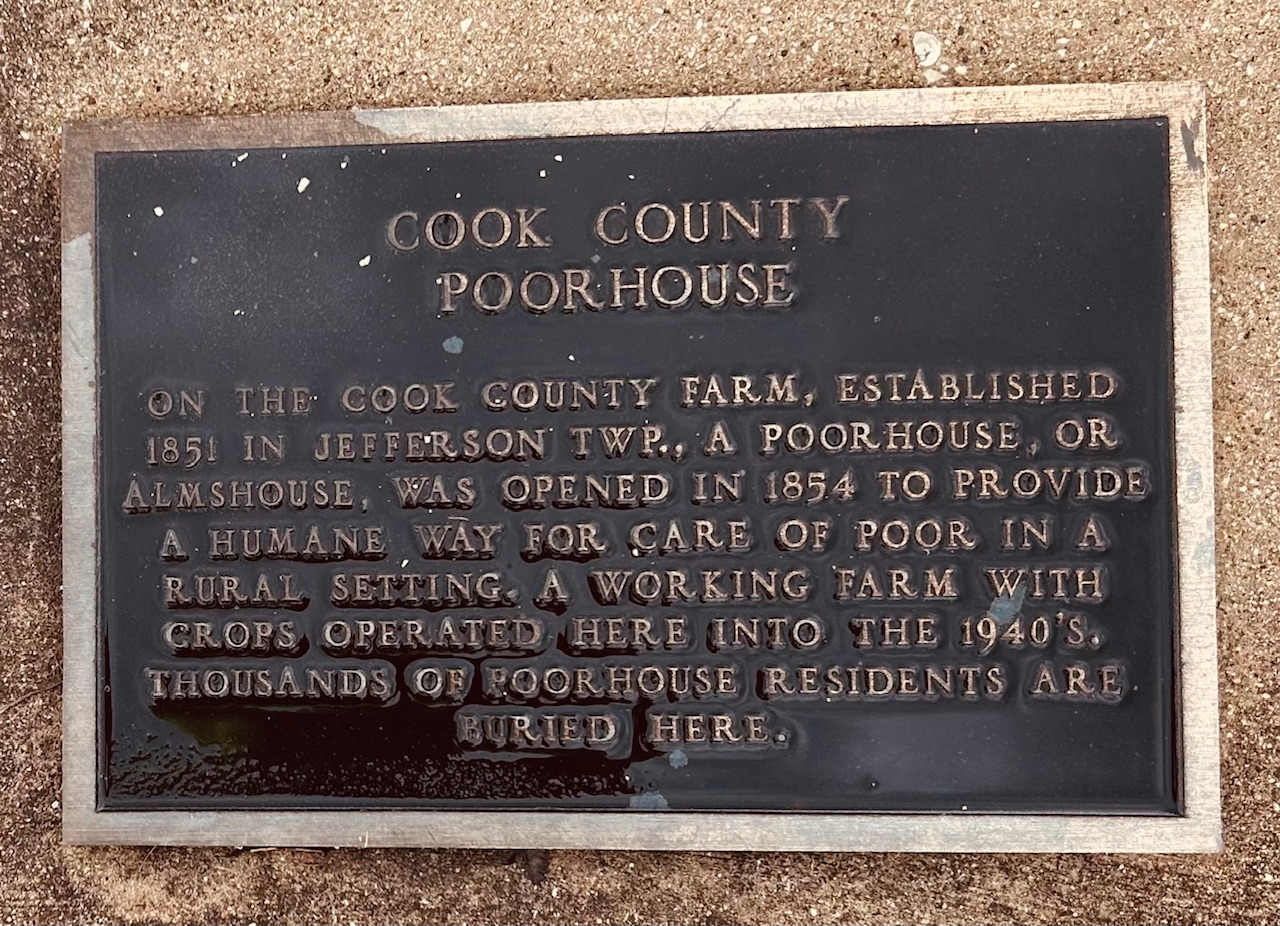
Poorhouse historical marker

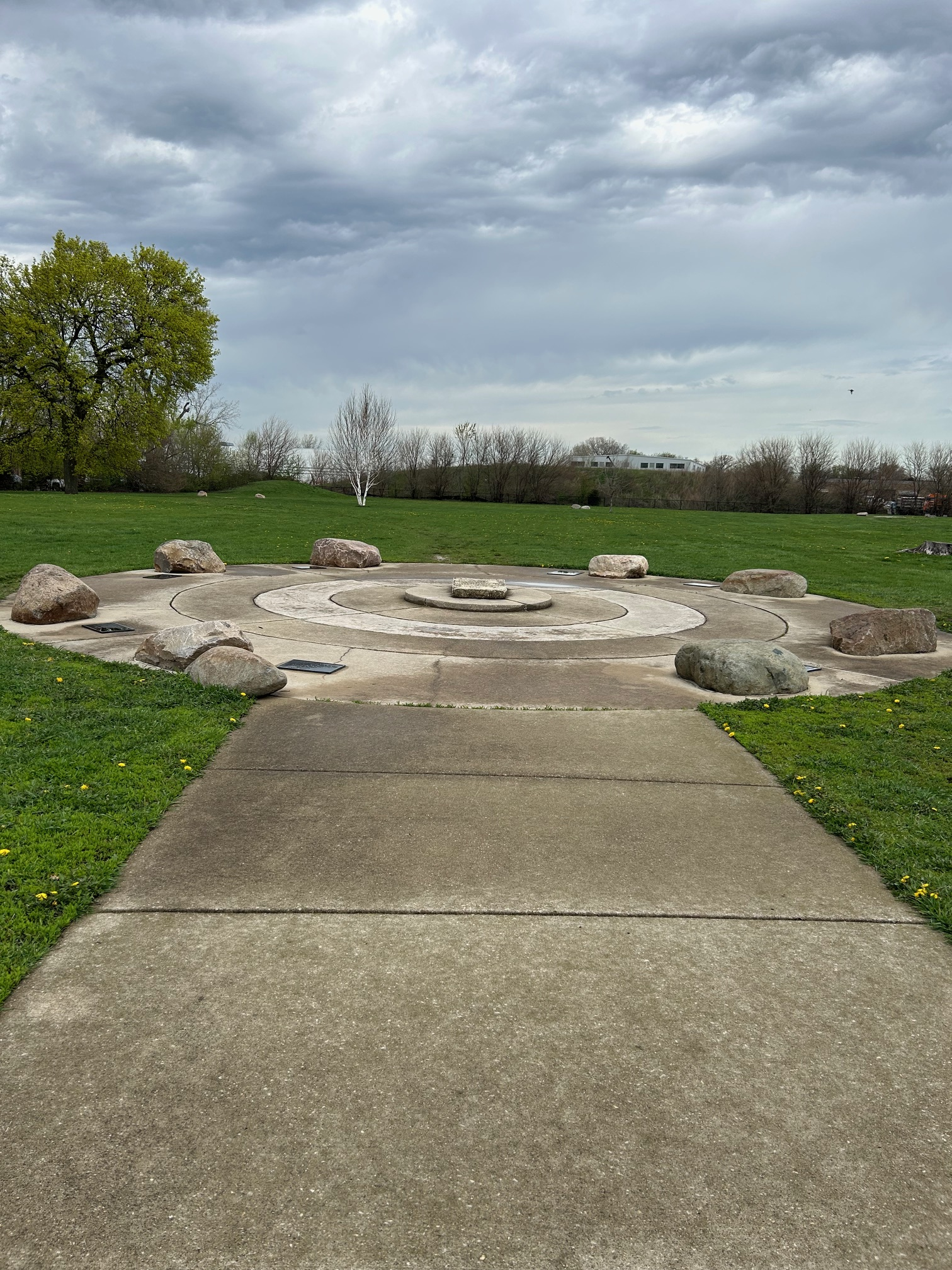
Read Dunning Memorial Park
