= Mount Olive Cemetery (Chicago) =

Cemetery in Cook County, Illinois, US

- Entrance to Mt. Olive cemetery in 2026.
- Interactive map of Mount Olive Cemetery

Details
- Established: 1889
- Location: Chicago, Illinois
- Country: United States
- Coordinates: 41°56′58″N 87°47′29″W
- Owned by: Dignity Memorial
- No. of interments: >19,000
- Website: Official website
- Find a Grave: Mount Olive Cemetery

Mount Olive Cemetery is a landscaped cemetery in Chicago, Illinois, United States. It was founded by Chicago's Scandinavian community in 1886. It is located at 3800 North Narragansett Avenue and is adjacent to Zion Gardens cemetery.

== History ==
In 1886, the Scandinavian Lutheran Cemetery Association purchased 65 acres south of the village of Dunning and established a community cemetery. The Association was renamed Mt. Olive in 1903. The Chicago, Milwaukee and St. Paul Railway used to run supply trains to the Cook County Poor Farm and Insane Asylum through the cemetery, as well as funeral trains to the two adjacent cemeteries.

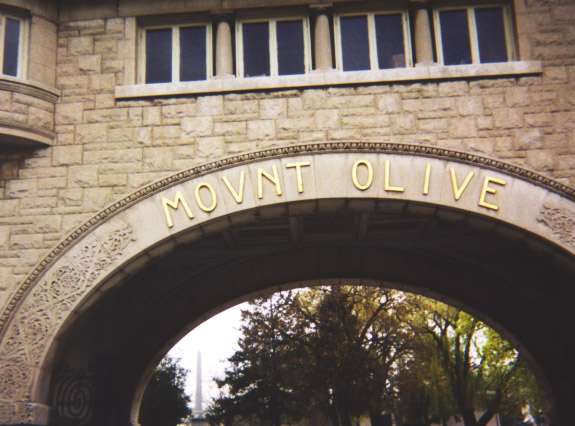
The front arch of Mount Olive Cemetery

== Notable burials ==
- Sybil Bauer (1903–1927), Olympic Gold Medal swimmer
- Harry Juul (1893–1942), MLB player
- Niels Juul (1859–1929), U.S. Representative
- Victor Olander (1873–1949), labor union leader
- Victims of the Iroquois Theatre Fire (1903)
- Victims of the Eastland Disaster (1915)
